= List of scorewriters =

This is a list of music notation programs that have articles on Wikipedia.

For programs specifically for writing guitar tablature, see the list of guitar tablature software.

== Free software ==
- Denemo
- Frescobaldi
- Impro-Visor
- LilyPond
- MuseScore Studio
- MusiXTeX
- NoteEdit
- Philip's Music Writer
- Rosegarden

== Proprietary ==
=== Available on both Windows and Mac ===
- Capella
- Cubase
- Dorico
- Encore
- Finale
- Guitar Pro
- Igor Engraver
- Mus2
- MusicEase
- Notion
- Overture
- ScoreCloud Studio
- Sibelius
- SmartScore 64 NE

=== Windows (but not Mac) ===
- Forte
- MagicScore
- Mozart
- MusEdit
- MusiCAD
- Music Write
- Notation Composer
- NoteWorthy Composer
- StaffPad (also available on iPadOS)

=== Mac (but not Windows) ===
- ConcertWare (Classic Mac OS)
- Logic Pro
- Mosaic (Mac OS 9 only)

=== Other (neither Windows nor Mac) ===
- Aegis Sonix (Amiga)
- Bank Street Music Writer (Atari 8-bit, Apple II, Commodore 64, MS-DOS)
- Deluxe Music Construction Set (Amiga, as well as Macintosh)
- Music Construction Set (IBM PC, Apple II, Atari 8-bit, C64)
- MusicPrinter Plus (MS-DOS)
- SCORE (MS-DOS)
  - WinScore (Windows)
- ScoreCloud Express (iOS)
- Cubase Score versions 1–2 (Atari ST)

== See also ==
- Comparison of scorewriters
- Comparison of MIDI editors and sequencers
- List of guitar tablature software
- List of music software
