= Comparison of scorewriters =

This is a comparison of music notation computer programs.

== General information ==
Name	Guitar tablature	WYSIWYG editor	MIDI entry (Note: When entering notes, "step-time" means one first selects the note duration then enters notes and chords one a time, while "real-time" means one plays the notes to enter with correct rhythm and the software recognizes the note durations.)	Playback	File formats		Developer(s)	Stable release; review date	License	Cost	Operating system(s)
Name	Guitar tablature	WYSIWYG editor	MIDI entry	Playback	Import	Export	Developer(s)	Stable release; review date	License	Cost	Operating system(s)
Canorus	No	Yes		MIDI	CanorusML, (Note: Canorus native format, .can) MusicXML, (Note: MusicXML, open standard XML-based music notation exchange format, .xml or (version 3.1 or later) .musicxml) MIDI, (Note: Standard MIDI file format, .mid or .midi) simple LilyPond (Note: LilyPond plain text native format, .ly)	MusicXML, MIDI, LilyPond, PDF	Reinhard Katzmann, Matevž Jekovec, Georg Rudolph	0.7.3; 18 June 2018 (8 years ago)	Since 0.7.3: GPL-3.0-only; 0.1.0 to 0.7.2: GPL-2.0-only	No cost	Linux
Capella	Yes	Yes	Step-time and real-time	MIDI, VST, SoundFonts	Capella, (Note: Capella native format, binary file, .cap) CapXML, (Note: Capella native format, compressed ZIP containing XML, .capx) MusicXML, MIDI	MusicXML, MIDI, BMP, JPEG, TIFF, PNG, Truevision TGA, PCX, HTML	capella-software AG	10.0-08; 20 April 2026 (4 months ago)	Proprietary	Non-free	Windows, macOS
Denemo	Yes	Yes	Step-time	MIDI	Denemo, (Note: Denemo native format, .denemo) limited LilyPond, MusicXML	LilyPond, MusicXML, WAV, Ogg, PDF, PNG, MIDI	Jeremiah Benham, Richard Shann	2.6.0; 11 March 2022 (4 years ago)	GPL-3.0-or-later	No cost	Windows, macOS, Linux
Dorico	Yes	Yes	Step-time and real-time	MIDI, VST	Dorico, (Note: Dorico native format, .dorico) MusicXML, MIDI	MIDI, MusicXML, WAV, MP3, PDF, PNG, TIFF, SVG	Steinberg	6.2.10; 31 March 2026 (4 months ago)	Proprietary	No cost up to 8 staves	Windows, macOS
Early Notation Typesetter	No	Yes	No	No	ENT (Note: Early notation typesetter native format, .ent)	ENT, PDF	Samuel Gossner, Daniel West, Dieter Theuns	0.9.6; 20 October 2020 (5 years ago)	Proprietary	No charge for single font	Windows, macOS, Linux
Encore	Yes	Yes		MIDI	Encore, (Note: Encore native format, .enc) MusicTime, (Note: MusicTime (by the same developer as Encore) native format, .mto, .mus (different to Finale .mus)) Rhapsody, (Note: Rhapsody (by the same developer as Encore) native format, .rhp) Compressed MusicXML (Note: MusicXML version 2.0 or later, compressed as a ZIP, .mxl)	MIDI, Cakewalk MIDI, (Note: Cakewalk MIDI file format, .mff) Master Tracks Pro, (Note: Master Tracks Pro (by the same developer as Encore) native format, .mts) PDF	Passport Music Software	5.0.4 (Windows); 5.0.7 (macOS); 2015 (11 years ago)	Proprietary	Non-free	Windows, macOS
Finale	Yes	Yes	Step-time and real-time	MIDI, VST, AU, (Note: Mac version only) Garritan library	Finale, (Note: Finale native format, .mus (2012 and earlier) or .musx (2014 and later)) MusicXML, MIDI	MusicXML, MIDI, WAV, MP3, AIFF, PDF, TIFF, JPEG, PNG, EPS, BMP, GIF, PICT	MakeMusic, Inc.	27.4.1; 12 December 2023 (2 years ago) final release	Proprietary	Non-free	Windows, macOS
Flat	Yes	Yes	Step-time and real-time	MIDI, VST, AU	MusicXML, MIDI, MuseScore, TuxGuitar, Guitar Pro (versions 3–8), Power Tab	MusicXML, MIDI, WAV, MP3, PDF, PNG, SVG	Tutteo	37.9.0; 17 October 2024 (22 months ago)	Proprietary	Freemium	Windows, macOS, Linux, Android, iOS
Forte	Yes	Yes	Step-time and real-time	MIDI, VST	Forte, (Note: Forte native format, .fnf) MusicXML, MIDI, CapXML	MusicXML, MIDI, BMP, JPEG	Lugert Verlag GmbH	12.1; 12 February 2021 (5 years ago) final release	Proprietary	Non-free	Windows
Frescobaldi	No	WYSIWYM	No	MIDI	LilyPond, MusicXML, ABC	MusicXML, PDF	Wilbert Berendsen	4.0.5; 11 February 2026 (6 months ago)	GPL-2.0-or-later	No cost	Windows, macOS, Linux
Guitar Pro	Yes	Yes		MIDI, RSE	Guitar Pro (versions 1–8), (Note: Guitar Pro native format version 1–2, .gtp; version 3, .gp3; version 4, .gp4; version 5, .gp5; version 6, .gpx; version 7, .gp) MusicXML, Compressed MusicXML, MIDI, ASCII tab, (Note: ASCII tablature plain text format, .txt, .tab, or .btab) Power Tab, (Note: Power Tab Editor native format, .ptb) TablEdit (Note: TablEdit native format, .tef)	MusicXML, MIDI, ASCII tab, PNG, PDF, WAV	Arobas Music	8.1.5; 27 October 2025 (10 months ago)	Proprietary	Non-free	Windows, macOS, Linux
Harmony Assistant	Yes	Yes	Step-time and real-time	Integrated free soundbank (Gold 2 sold separately), SoundFonts, MIDI, partial support of VST (Windows and Mac only)	Myriad, (Note: Harmony Assistant native format, .myr (formerly .mus), .mux (sound bank independent), .mu3 (compressed)) MusicXML, Compressed MusicXML, MIDI, Karaoke, (Note: Standard MIDI file format including standard MIDI lyrics, used for karaoke, .kar) CMF, (Note: Creative Music File, a cut-down MIDI format by Creative Labs, .cmf), Module, (Note: Module file, .mod, .s3m (ScreamTracker 3)) Encore, MusicTime, Rhapsody, NoteWorthy, (Note: NoteWorthy Composer native format, .nwc or .nwctxt) ABC, (Note: ABC plain text format, .abc) Guitar Pro (versions 1–5), TablEdit, Finale (.mus), ETF (Note: Finale Enigma Transport Format, .etf), audio formats imported as sound "digital" track	MusicXML, Compressed MusicXML, HTML (MyrWeb), MIDI, Karaoke, ABC, WAV, MP3, Ogg, AIFF, PDF, PNG, SVG, TIFF, video using FFmpeg	Myriad Software	9.9.9i; 11 October 2025 (10 months ago)	Proprietary	Non-free	Windows, macOS, Linux
Impro-Visor	No	Yes	Step-time and real-time	MIDI	Impro-Visor (Note: Impro-Visor native format, .ls)	MusicXML, MIDI, PDF	Bob Keller	10.2; 1 August 2019 (7 years ago)	GPL-2.0-or-later	No cost	Windows, macOS, Linux
LilyPond	Yes	No	No	MIDI	LilyPond; using converters: ABC, ETF, MIDI, MusicXML	PDF, PNG, PS, SVG	Han-Wen Nienhuys, Jan Nieuwenhuizen	2.26.0; 21 April 2026 (4 months ago)	GPL-3.0-or-later	No cost	Windows, macOS, Linux, FreeBSD
MagicScore	Yes	Yes	Step-time and real-time	MIDI, SoundFonts	SFD, (Note: Maestro software family native format, .sfd) MusicXML, MIDI, Karaoke, WAV, MP3	MusicXML, MIDI, Karaoke, WAV, MP3, PDF, TIFF, JPEG, PNG, BMP, GIF, EMF, WMF	Maestro Music Software	8.280; 2017 (9 years ago)	Proprietary	Non-free	Windows
Mozart	Yes	Yes	Step-time and real-time	MIDI	Mozart, (Note: Mozart native format, .mz) MusicXML, NIFF, (Note: Notation Interchange File Format, .nif) MIDI, Karaoke, ABC	MusicXML, MIDI, ABC, BMP, EMF, GIF, JPEG, PBM, PNG, TIFF	Mozart Music Software	17.0.7; April 2026 (4 months ago)	Proprietary	Non-free	Windows
Mus2	No	Yes		MIDI	Mus2 (Note: Mus2 notation and tuning file format, .mus2, .mu2)	MIDI, AIFF, WAV, PDF, SVG, BMP, JPEG, PNG	Utku Uzmen (Data-Soft Ltd.)	3.3.1; 23 September 2025 (11 months ago)	Proprietary	Non-free	Windows, macOS
MuseScore Studio	Yes	Yes	Step-time and real-time	MIDI, SoundFonts, SFZ, VST3	MuseScore, (Note: MuseScore native format, .mscz; uncompressed XML-based format, .mscx; style sheet, .mss; score album, .album) MusicXML, Compressed MusicXML, MEI, (Note: MEI Music Encoding Initiative, .mei) MIDI, Karaoke, MuseData, (Note: MuseData project format, .md) Bagpipe Music Writer, (Note: Bagpipe Music Writer native format, .bww) Band-in-a-Box, (Note: Band-in-a-Box native format, .mgu or .sgu) Overture, (Note: Overture native format, .ove) Capella, CapXML, Guitar Pro (versions 1–6), Power Tab (experimental), PDF (experimental), ABC (with plugin)	MusicXML, Compressed MusicXML, MEI, PDF, PNG, SVG, MIDI, WAV, FLAC, Ogg, MP3	The MuseScore developer community	4.6.5; 18 December 2025 (8 months ago)	GPL-3.0-only for desktop tools; online and mobile tools are proprietary and freemium	No cost for most tools	Windows, macOS, Linux
MusiCAD	No	Yes		MIDI	MusiCAD, (Note: MusiCAD plain text native format, .mc) MIDI, ABC	MIDI, ABC, PDF, JPEG, PNG, BMP	Musys Software	4.0; 1 May 2015 (11 years ago)	Proprietary	Prompt to purchase license appears when saving	Windows
MusicEase	Yes	Yes		MIDI	MusicEase, (Note: MusicEase native format, .mez) MusicXML, MIDI, ABC, SongWright (Note: SongWright native format, .sw)	MIDI, PDF	MusicEase Software	10.1m; November 2024 (1 year ago)	Proprietary	Non-free	Windows, macOS
Musink	No	WYSIWYM		MIDI	Musink (Note: Musink native format, .musink)	MIDI, PDF, PNG, XPS	Lee Reid	1.3.0.3; 21 March 2025 (17 months ago)	Proprietary	No cost	Windows, macOS
MusiXTeX	Yes	No	No	No	TeX (incl. PMX and M-Tx), (Note: PMX, preprocessor language for MusixTeX, .pmx; M-Tx, processor for PMX, .mtx) MusicXML (with converters)	DVI, (Note: TeX device independent file format, .dvi) PS, PDF, MIDI (for PMX input)	Daniel Taupin, Ross Mitchell, Andreas Egler	1.41; 15 November 2025 (9 months ago)	GPL-2.0-or-later	No cost	Windows, macOS, Linux
Notation Composer	No	Yes	Step-time and real-time	MIDI, SoundFonts	Notation, (Note: NoteSoft file, Notation Software native format, .not) MusicXML, Compressed MusicXML, MIDI, Karaoke	MusicXML, Compressed MusicXML, PDF, MIDI, Karaoke, PNG, BMP, JPEG, GIF, WAV, FLAC, Ogg, MP3	Notation Software	5.1.4; 15 April 2026 (4 months ago)	Proprietary	Non-free	Windows, macOS, Linux
NoteWorthy Composer	Yes	Yes	Step-time and real-time	MIDI	NWC, MIDI, Karaoke	MIDI	NoteWorthy Software	2.75a.2; 2017 (9 years ago)	Proprietary	Non-free	Windows
The Note Processor	No	Yes	Step-time	MIDI	MIDI, DARMS	MIDI, TIFF, DARMS, PostScript	Stephen Dydo, ThoughtProcessors	2.3; 1991 (35 years ago)	Proprietary	Non-free	MS-DOS
Notion	Yes	Yes	Step-time and real-time	MIDI, VST	MusicXML, Compressed MusicXML, MIDI, Guitar Pro (versions 4–5)	MusicXML, MIDI, WAV	PreSonus	6.8.2; 24 August 2021 (5 years ago)	Proprietary	Non-free	Windows, macOS, Android, iOS
Overture	Yes	Yes	Step-time and real-time	MIDI, VST, AU	Overture, MusicXML, MIDI, Score Writer (Note: Score Writer (by the same developer as Overture) native format, .scw)	MusicXML, MIDI, WAV, MP3	Sonic Scores	5.6.1.1; 2 December 2019 (6 years ago)	Proprietary	Non-free	Windows, macOS
Philip's Music Writer	Yes	No	No	MIDI	PMW (Note: Philip's Music Writer native format, human-readable text, .pmw)	MIDI, PS	Philip Hazel	5.33; 22 December 2025 (8 months ago)	GPL-2.0-or-later	No cost	Linux (older versions for RISC OS)
Power Tab Editor	Yes	Yes		MIDI	Power Tab, MIDI	MIDI, ASCII tab, BMP, HTML	Brad Larsen	2.0.22; 29 June 2025 (13 months ago)	GPL-3.0-or-later for version 2.0 and later	No cost	Windows, macOS, Linux
Rosegarden	No	Yes	Step-time and real-time	MIDI	Rosegarden, (Note: Rosegarden native format, .rg) MusicXML, MIDI, Hydrogen (Note: Hydrogen drum machine song XML file format, .h2song)	LilyPond, MusicXML, MIDI, Csound, (Note: Csound audio domain-specific language format, without orchestra data, .csd) Mup, (Note: Music Publisher Score file format, .mup) PDF	Chris Cannam, Richard Bown, Guillaume Laurent	25.12; 3 December 2025 (8 months ago)	GPL-2.0-or-later	No cost	Linux
SCORE	Yes	No	Step-time	MIDI	SCORE (.mus)	EPS	Leland Smith, San Andreas Press	5.01; 1 November 2013 (12 years ago)	Proprietary	Non-free	MS-DOS, Windows
ScoreCloud Studio	No	Yes	Step-time and real-time	MIDI, VST	MIDI, live audio	MusicXML, MIDI, WAV, PDF	Doremir Music Research AB	4.10.2; April 2026 (4 months ago)	Proprietary	Free without file saving	Windows, macOS, iOS
Sibelius	Yes	Yes	Step-time and real-time	MIDI, VST, AU, Avid library	Sibelius, (Note: Sibelius (scorewriter) native format, .sib) MusicXML, MIDI	MusicXML, MIDI, MP3, PDF, SVG, EPS, PNG	Avid Technology, Inc.	2026.2; 25 February 2026 (6 months ago)	Proprietary	No cost up to 8 staves	Windows, macOS, RISC OS, Android, iOS
SmartScore 64 NE	Yes	Yes		MIDI	SmartScore, (Note: SmartScore native format, .enf) scanned images, MusicXML, NIFF	MusicXML, MIDI, Finale, NIFF, PDF	Musitek Corporation	11.6.113 (Windows); 11.6.115 (macOS); 13 October 2025 (10 months ago)	Proprietary	Non-free	Windows, macOS
TuxGuitar	Yes	Yes		MIDI	TuxGuitar, (Note: TuxGuitar native format, .tg) MusicXML, MIDI, Guitar Pro (versions 1–6), Power Tab, TablEdit	MIDI, Guitar Pro (versions 3–5), LilyPond, ASCII tab, PDF	Julian Gabriel Casadesus	2.0.1; 27 December 2025 (8 months ago)	LGPL-2.1-only	No cost	Windows, macOS, Linux, FreeBSD, Android
Name	Guitar tablature	WYSIWYG editor	MIDI entry	Playback	Import	Export	Developer(s)	Stable release; review date	License	Cost	Operating system(s)
Name	Guitar tablature	WYSIWYG editor	MIDI entry	Playback	File formats		Developer(s)	Stable release; review date	License	Cost	Operating system(s)

== See also ==
- Comparison of MIDI editors and sequencers
- List of guitar tablature software
- List of music software
- List of scorewriters
