= Forte (notation program) =

Music notation software

- Forte running on Microsoft Windows
- Developer: Lugert Verlag GmbH
- Final release: 12.1 / 12 February 2021; 5 years ago
- Operating system: Microsoft Windows
- Available in: English, German
- Type: Scorewriter (Music notation)
- License: Proprietary software
- Website: www.fortenotation.com

Forte was a music notation program developed by the German company Lugert Verlag, located in Handorf. Its name is derived from the dynamic marking of forte. The program was available in both German and English.

== History ==
The Lugert publishing house, which developed the Forte software, had its beginnings in 1981 when Wulf-Dieter Lugert and Volker Schütz were preparing popular music for higher education courses. The use of popular music in the classroom was unusual in Germany at the time. In 1998 the principals formed a publishing house, which subsequently became known as Lugert Verlag. The firm later diversifies, producing magazines and audio media and selling musical instruments. Forte, their score-writing program, was first released in 2005.

Following the death of the founder of Lugert publishing house, Wulf-Dieter Lugert, in October 2025, the development of the software Forte has been discontinued.

== Functionality ==
The program can import MIDI, MusicXML and karaoke files, as well as the CapXML file format of the Capella notation program, and can export songs in MIDI and MusicXML formats for sharing with other tools such as the open-source MuseScore and LilyPond programs. It also allows users to save music scores as JPEG, TIFF or EPS files. Three of its tools include the Music Ruler, which allows users to enter notes; the audio sequencer, which allows users to record or import audio and play it in conjunction with their composition; and the complex scores, which allows users to write elaborate pieces. Recent versions of the program feature the ability to automatically transpose notated music among various keys, while their ScanScore 2 module performs optical music recognition on medium- to high-resolution PDF, JPEG, TIFF or PNG files of music score images, generating reasonably accurate MusicXML input for further processing within the main Forte program; this feature, however, is only available in the company's Premium edition.

== Versions ==
Forte is available in several editions, with the more expensive Premium edition implementing full functionality while the Home and Basic editions have more limited capabilities, such as the number of staves, voices and verses supported. An education edition and a specialist version designed for hymn and worship music are also available.

== See also ==
- Comparison of scorewriters
- List of MIDI editors and sequencers
- List of guitar tablature software
- Dynamics (music)
- List of music software
