= MuseScore =

Music notation software

MuseScore Studio

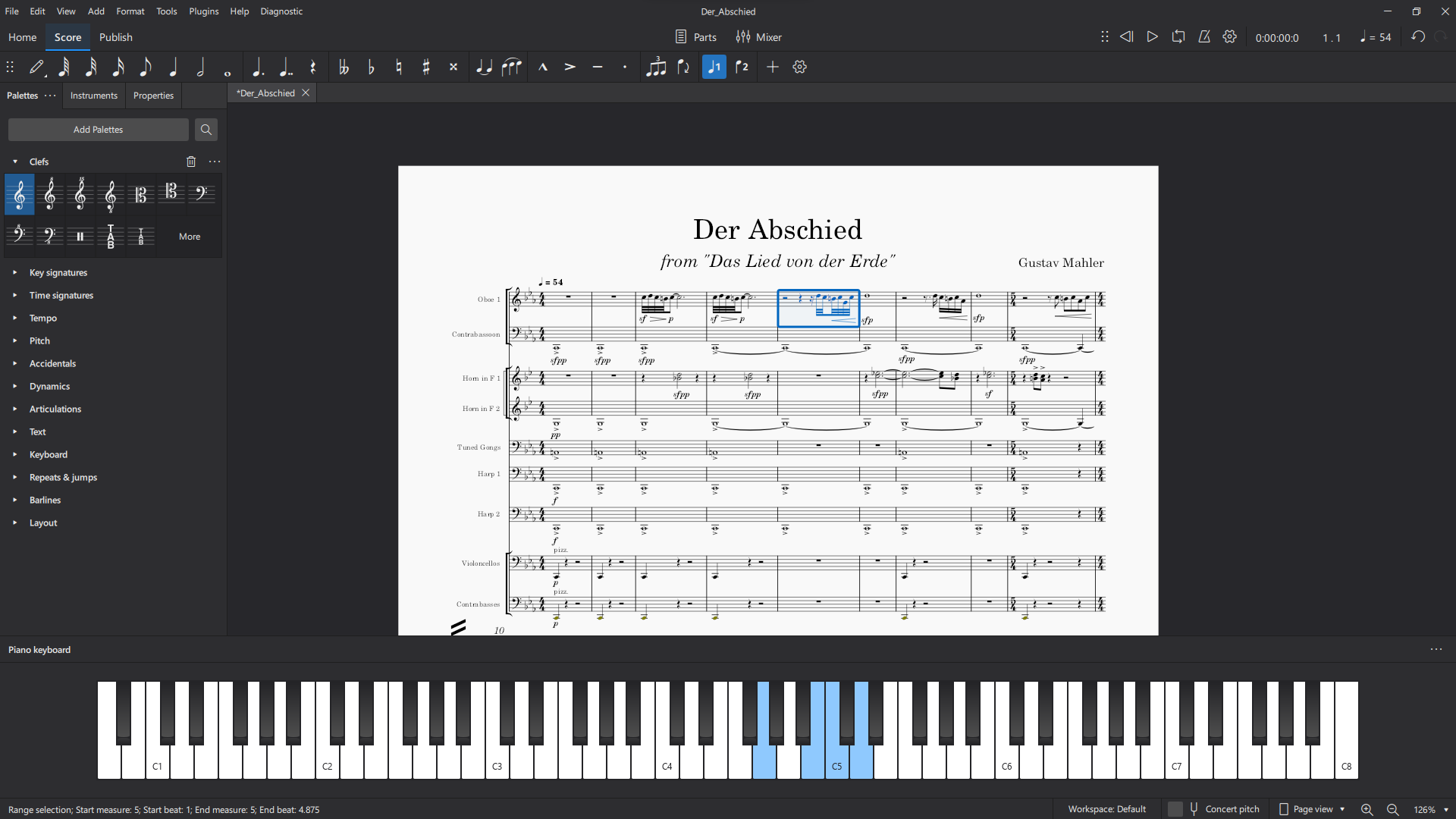
- MuseScore 4.0 in dark mode, showing palettes, and full screen mode
- Original author: Werner Schweer
- Developers: Muse Group; MuseScore BVBA
- Release: 2 September 2002; 24 years ago
- Stable release: 4.7.4 / 7 July 2026; 3 months ago
- Written in: C++, Qt, QML
- Operating system: Windows 7 and later, Linux, macOS 10.10 and later
- Platform: x86-64 (Windows, Linux and macOS), IA-32 (Windows only)
- Size: 110–173 MB
- Available in: Fully supported in 17 languages
- List of languages Afrikaans, Asturian, Catalan, Chinese (China, Hong Kong, Taiwan), Croatian, Czech, Danish, Dutch, English (United Kingdom and United States), Faroese, Finnish, French, German, Hebrew, Hungarian, Italian, Japanese, Norwegian, Polish, Portuguese (Portugal, Brazil), Romanian, Russian, Slovenian, Spanish, Swedish, Turkish
- Type: Scorewriter
- License: MuseScore 0–3: GPL-2.0-only with font exception and proprietary (online and mobile); MuseScore 4: GPL-3.0 with font exception and proprietary (online and mobile)
- Website: musescore.org

MuseScore Studio (branded as MuseScore before 2024) is a free and open-source music notation program for Windows, macOS, and Linux under the Muse Group, which owns the associated online score-sharing platform MuseScore.com and a freemium mobile score viewer and playback app.

== History ==
Original MuseScore logo (v.1 to v.4.5).

MuseScore was created as a fork of the MusE sequencer's codebase. In 2002, Werner Schweer, one of the MusE developers, decided to remove notation support from MusE and create a stand-alone notation program from the codebase.

The MuseScore.org website was created in 2008, and quickly showed a rapidly rising number of MuseScore downloads. By December 2008, the download rate had reached 15,000 per month.

Version 0.9.5 was released in August 2009. By October 2009, MuseScore was being downloaded more than 1000 times per day. By the fourth quarter of 2010, it was being downloaded 80,000 times per month.

At the end of 2013, the project moved from SourceForge to GitHub. Continuous download statistics have not been publicly available since then. However, a March 2015 press release stated that MuseScore had been downloaded over eight million times; and in December 2016 the project stated that version 2.0.3 had been downloaded 1.9 million times in the nine months since its release.

The MuseScore company uses income from their commercial sheet music-sharing service to support the free notation software's development.

In 2017, the MuseScore company was acquired by Ultimate Guitar, which added full-time paid developers to the open source team. In 2021, the MuseScore company, Ultimate Guitar, and other properties (including Audacity) were put under a new parent company, Muse Group, in Limassol, Cyprus. In 2022, the MuseScore company finished relocating to Muse Group's Cyprus headquarters. In January 2024, the music notation app formerly known as MuseScore was rebranded MuseScore Studio.

== Features ==
A piece of sheet music created in MuseScore

MuseScore Studio's main purpose is the creation of high-quality engraved musical scores in a "What-You-See-Is-What-You-Get" environment. It supports unlimited staves, linked parts and part extraction, tablature, MIDI input and output, percussion notation, cross-staff beaming, automatic transposition, lyrics (multiple verses), fretboard diagrams, and in general everything commonly used in sheet music. Style options to change the appearance and layout are available, and style sheets can be saved and applied to other scores. There are pre-defined templates for many types of ensembles. Functionality can be extended by making use of the many freely available plugins.

MuseScore Studio can also play back scores through the built-in sequencer and SoundFont sample library. Multiple SoundFonts can be loaded into MuseScore Studio's synthesizer. It includes a mixer to mute, solo, or adjust the volume of individual parts, and chorus, reverb and other effects are supported during playback. MIDI output to external devices and software synthesizers is also possible.

=== Supported file formats ===
MuseScore Studio can import and export to many formats, though some are export-only (visual representations and audio) and some are import-only (native files from some other music notation programs).

MuseScore Studio's native file formats are .mscx, which is XML data containing the score; and .mscz, a zip archive containing the .mscx and other data. The .mscz format is the default format, as it occupies less space and supports additional data, such as images.

MuseScore Studio can also import and export compressed (.mxl) and uncompressed (.xml) MusicXML files, which allows a score to be edited in other music notation programs (including Dorico, Sibelius, and Finale). The latest edition of MuseScore Studio uses MusicXML 4.0. It can also import and export MIDI (.mid, .midi, and .kar), which is supported by many other programs (such as Synthesia), although since MIDI is not designed for sheet music, some information may be lost.

MuseScore Studio can also import certain other music software's native formats, including Band-in-a-Box (.mgu and .sgu), Bagpipe Music Writer (.bww), Guitar Pro (.gtp, .gp3, .gp4, .gp5, and .gpx), Capella (must be version 2000 (3.0) or later; .cap and .capx) and Overture formats. It can also import MuseData (.md), which has been superseded by MusicXML.

Audio can be exported to WAV, FLAC, MP3 and OGG files; and graphical representations of scores can be exported to PDF, SVG and PNG formats, as well as printed.

=== Mobile player ===
Since May 2014 MuseScore has mobile apps available for iOS, Android and Kindle Fire which tie into the MuseScore score-sharing site. The app can play scores, and allows transposition and part extraction, but does not create or edit scores.

=== Portable application ===
MuseScore Studio also runs as a portable application. It can be installed onto a regular hard disk drive or stored on a removable storage device such as a CD, USB flash drive or flash card, so that it can be run on any compatible Windows computer system.

=== Custom fonts ===
Playback and VST support

MIDI playback on MuseScore 3.

VST playback on MuseScore 4.

Fragment: Tchaikovsky Violin Concerto, Movement 1, Measures 170-195.

A new default notation font, Leland, created by Martin Keary and Simon Smith, was introduced in MuseScore 3.6. Its name is a reference to Leland Smith, the creator of SCORE, a notation program formerly used by many publishers. It is licensed under the SIL Open Font License.

The update also introduced a new text font, Edwin, influenced by the classic New Century Schoolbook typeface.

=== VST support ===
In Musescore 4.0, support was added for VST3 instrument and effects plugins on Windows and macOS. The Muse Group also released a free orchestral plugin, MuseSounds, designed to provide more realistic playback.

== Versions ==
Version Name		Date Released	Notable features	Screenshot
Pre-release
MuseScore 0.9	0.9.5	August 2009	First stable version, as well as the first version to support macOS.	MuseScore 0.9.5 running on Windows 11.
MuseScore 0.9	0.9.6	June 2010	Introduced many new features, including out-of-the-box support for playback of all instruments based on the General MIDI standard, support for multimeasure rests, initial support for custom key signatures, and the "Save Online" feature connecting to sheet music sharing site MuseScore.com.	MuseScore 0.9.5 running on Windows 11.
MuseScore 1
MuseScore 1.0		February 2011	The milestone release focused on delivering a stable package rather than adding new features to the prerelease versions.	MuseScore 1.0 running on Windows 11.
MuseScore 1.1		July 2011	Fixed around 60 bugs and featuring improved jazz sheet support. MuseScore Connect, a feature allowing on-line community interaction and publishing, was also included in this release.	MuseScore 1.0 running on Windows 11.
MuseScore 1.2		March 2012	This version included over 100 bug fixes, improved MusicXML import/export support, and improved support for special characters. It also introduced Marc Sabatella's original composition "Reunion" as the new demo score loaded when launching MuseScore.	MuseScore 1.0 running on Windows 11.
MuseScore 1.3		February 2013	Small update containing mostly bug fixes.	MuseScore 1.0 running on Windows 11.
MuseScore 2
MuseScore 2.0	2.0.0	March 2015	A large number of new features were introduced, including full support for tablature and guitar chord diagrams, linked part/score editing, an image capture capability, two new SMuFL-compliant music fonts, and MusicXML 3.0 support.	MuseScore 2.0 running on Windows 11. MuseScore 2.0 running on Windows 11.
MuseScore 2.0	2.0.1	May 2015	Many bug fixes and introducing Isaac Weiss' "Getting Started" tutorial score along with several additional templates.	MuseScore 2.0 running on Windows 11. MuseScore 2.0 running on Windows 11.
MuseScore 2.0	2.0.2	July 2015	Many bug fixes and new features, including playback of trills and other ornaments. The professional guide "Mastering MuseScore" was published in tandem with this release.	MuseScore 2.0 running on Windows 11. MuseScore 2.0 running on Windows 11.
MuseScore 2.0	2.0.3	April 2016	Many bug fixes, and new features including the ability to reorder linked parts, a tool to copy all lyrics to the clipboard, and an AppImage build for all Linux flavors.	MuseScore 2.0 running on Windows 11. MuseScore 2.0 running on Windows 11.
MuseScore 2.1		May 2017	Numerous new features, including real-time MIDI input, a new "Swap" function, and a tool to rewrite rhythms for clearer notation.	MuseScore 2.0 running on Windows 11. MuseScore 2.0 running on Windows 11.
MuseScore 2.2		March 2018	Over 200 bug fixes and new features, including MIDI output and a new SoundFont. Three regressions affecting playback were fixed one week later in MuseScore 2.2.1.	MuseScore 2.0 running on Windows 11. MuseScore 2.0 running on Windows 11.
MuseScore 2.3		June 2018	New extension facility (in addition to the existing system of plugins) and a first extension that customizes MuseScore for drumline music. Two point updates with bug fixes, 2.3.1 and 2.3.2, were released in July 2018.	MuseScore 2.0 running on Windows 11. MuseScore 2.0 running on Windows 11.
MuseScore 3
MuseScore 3.0		December 2018	Many new features, including an automatic smart layout system to avoid collisions between score elements, a jazz notation font, support for more advanced notations, more style controls, tours to help new users, a timeline reduction view for faster navigation, redesigned mixer and piano roll editor, and a built-in auto-update facility.	MuseScore 3.6 running on Windows 11 in dark mode. MuseScore 3.6 running on Windows 11 in dark mode.
MuseScore 3.1		May 2019	Many new features, including playback of crescendos and diminuendos on single notes and more customization options for fretboard diagrams.	MuseScore 3.6 running on Windows 11 in dark mode. MuseScore 3.6 running on Windows 11 in dark mode.
MuseScore 3.2		June 2019	Many new features.	MuseScore 3.6 running on Windows 11 in dark mode. MuseScore 3.6 running on Windows 11 in dark mode.
MuseScore 3.3		October 2019	New palette and note input workflow designs and accessibility improvements.	MuseScore 3.6 running on Windows 11 in dark mode. MuseScore 3.6 running on Windows 11 in dark mode.
MuseScore 3.4		January 2020	New telemetry feature and UX improvements.	MuseScore 3.6 running on Windows 11 in dark mode. MuseScore 3.6 running on Windows 11 in dark mode.
MuseScore 3.5		August 2020	New chord symbol playback feature, workflow improvements, layout improvements and many more.	MuseScore 3.6 running on Windows 11 in dark mode. MuseScore 3.6 running on Windows 11 in dark mode.
MuseScore 3.6		January 2021	New notation and text fonts, and other engraving improvements.	MuseScore 3.6 running on Windows 11 in dark mode. MuseScore 3.6 running on Windows 11 in dark mode.
MuseScore 4
MuseScore 4.0		December 2022	An almost complete overhaul with many new features added. Version 4.0 added an included orchestral plugin, VST support, a new engraving system and a new playback system and mixer.	MuseScore 4.0 running on Windows 11 in dark mode. MuseScore 4.0 running on Windows 11 in dark mode.
MuseScore 4.1		July 2023	New engraving options for ornaments, harp pedal diagrams, and guitar capos, as well as other engraving improvements. Significant performance improvements thanks to an improved playback engine, and a live braille module for visually impaired users.	MuseScore 4.0 running on Windows 11 in dark mode. MuseScore 4.0 running on Windows 11 in dark mode.
MuseScore 4.2		December 2023	Improved notation for guitar, with a new system for bends and support for alternate string tunings, engraving refinements for ties and arpeggios, a more versatile system for part scores, and the ability to import and export files in the MEI format.	MuseScore 4.0 running on Windows 11 in dark mode. MuseScore 4.0 running on Windows 11 in dark mode.
MuseScore Studio 4.3	4.3.0	May 2024	"Contains numerous fixes and improvements, including a new sound flags feature that provides advanced control over score playback with MuseSounds." Renamed to MuseScore Studio.	MuseScore 4.0 running on Windows 11 in dark mode. MuseScore 4.0 running on Windows 11 in dark mode.
MuseScore Studio 4.3	4.3.1	May 2024	"Improves CPU performance when using MuseSounds, and resolves a number of playback bugs associated with repeats".	MuseScore 4.0 running on Windows 11 in dark mode. MuseScore 4.0 running on Windows 11 in dark mode.
MuseScore Studio 4.4		August 2024	New Muse Drumline sound library, more flexible system for dynamics, overhauled accidentals layout system, and many more improvements. Version 4.4 was the first to use Qt 6, allowing amongst other things for native Apple Silicon support.	MuseScore 4.0 running on Windows 11 in dark mode. MuseScore 4.0 running on Windows 11 in dark mode.
MuseScore 4.5+				MuseScore 4.0 running on Windows 11 in dark mode. MuseScore 4.0 running on Windows 11 in dark mode.
MuseScore Studio 4.5		March 2025	New popup and shortcuts for dynamics. A fully accessible, modern 'drum pad' layout, with faster note input, and seamless integration with MuseSounds percussion libraries. Workflow updates intended to feel familiar to Finale users. New engraving features.	
MuseScore Studio 4.6		September 2025	New features: hide empty staves, realtime playback, PVG (piano, voice, guitar) scores, chord symbols (polychord vs. slash chord), loading any SMuFL-compliant fonts, Linux VST3 support, workflow and engraving enhancements around measure numbers, horizontal note spacing, repeat count text over barline, selection filter, text formatting widget.	
MuseScore Studio 4.7		May 2026	New features: guitars dive lines and capo transcription, improved chord selection, searchable sounds and effects, and mp4 export.	

== Development ==
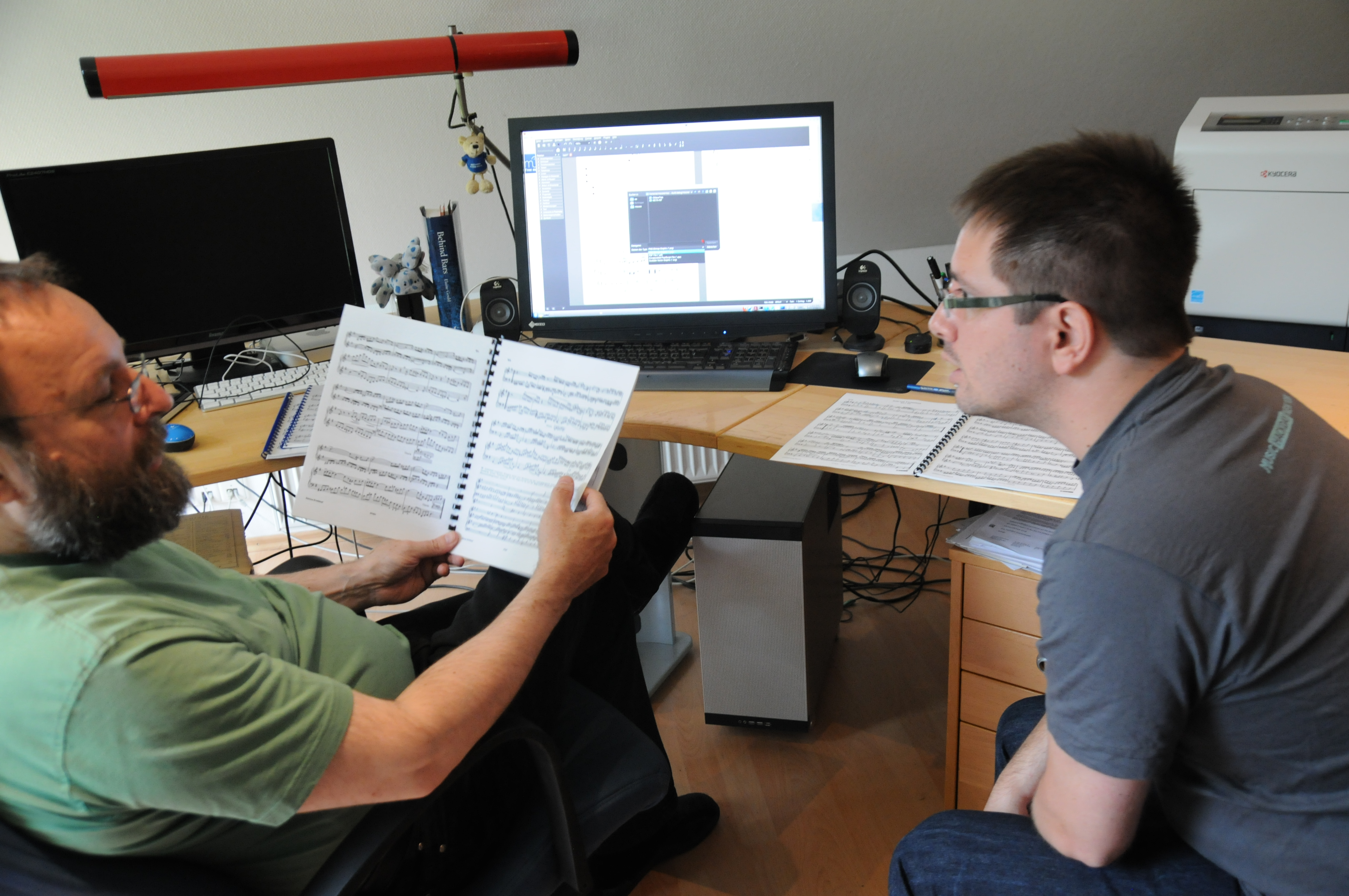
Werner Schweer and Nicolas Froment working on MuseScore 2.0

MuseScore Studio is free and open-source software and is written mainly in C++, with the graphical user interface making use of the cross-platform Qt toolkit. Originally founded by Werner Schweer, Nicolas Froment and Thomas Bonte, the project is now headed by Bradley Kunda (Product Owner) with a wider community also contributing. Google Summer of Code has sponsored students to help develop MuseScore in 2013, 2014 and 2016 to 2021. MuseScore Studio's development takes place on GitHub.

Contributing code to MuseScore Studio requires that contributors sign an online Contributor License Agreement.

== Reception ==
MuseScore has accumulated generally favorable reviews since its release from critics, scholars, and educators, who praise its relative ease of use and free availability.

Online computer magazine PC World gave a rating of 3.5 out of 5 stars to MuseScore 1.3. It praised the precise control over the size and spacing of every object, and the abilities to define keyboard shortcuts and drag and drop modifiers, but criticized its mouse methodology as occasionally unintuitive for not fully exploring the potential of drag-and-drop menus. Technology news website Softpedia rated it 4.5 out of 5 stars, calling it "well-organized" and "comprehensive". It was lauded for its customizability, the ability to upload user sheet music, and import support for many different file formats.

In its review of the 3.3 release, TopTenReviews gave MuseScore 4.5-stars out of 5, praising its ability to create tablature and percussion sheet music alongside traditional notation, its support for hundreds of instruments, and the abilities it gave users to share music and interact with other users online.

Reviewing MuseScore 4.0, British magazine Music Teacher welcomed the version's improved engraving, new cloud storage, and focus on accessibility, such as allowing users to export their compositions in braille, an expanded colour scheme, and keyboard navigation. It also noted its support for VSTs, including the application's own MuseSounds, which the magazine considered a boon to teachers seeking easier ways to export their scores to audio.

== Adoption ==
MuseScore reported over 7,000 downloads per day in 2016. Many Linux distributions also include MuseScore in their software libraries, such as in the Ubuntu Software Center. As of December 2022, MuseScore had been downloaded 12.1 million times.

Many educational institutions use MuseScore, including Drew University and the Ionian University. The Board of Education of La Seigneurie des Milles-îles in Canada has made it available on 10,000 computers in schools across the Milles-îles region of Québec.

== Crowd-sourced engraving projects ==
=== Open Goldberg Variations ===
In 2011, MuseScore launched a Kickstarter campaign to create high-quality, freely available digital score and audio versions of the Goldberg Variations. The process influenced the development of MuseScore 2, with notation improvements needed in order to create a high-quality engraving of the variations. With the fundraising goal met, MuseScore developers, pianist Kimiko Ishizaka, and crowd-sourced reviewers collaborated to create an engraved score and also record a new album, both of which were released under a Creative Commons Zero license (without copyright), meaning they can be downloaded and shared freely. In 2012, at the end of the online public review process, the final engraved score was released for free on MuseScore.com, and printed and bound by GRIN in Germany. Kimiko Ishizaka's recording was released for free on BandCamp.

=== Open Well-Tempered Clavier ===
In 2013, a second successful Kickstarter funded the creation of a new edition of Bach's Well-Tempered Clavier. Once again, the score underwent public review on MuseScore.com, and was recorded by Kimiko Ishizaka, with both score and recordings released into the public domain in 2015.

=== Braille editions ===
After hearing from a blind musician who contributed to the Open WTC Kickstarter, MuseScore set up new stretch funding goals to support making music notation more accessible to blind and visually impaired musicians. Though the top goal of automatically converting all scores in the MuseScore.com library to braille was not funded, they did get funding to create braille sheet music for both the Goldberg Variations and the Well-Tempered Clavier. The digital files (for braille terminals & printers) are available for free download, like the standard scores.

=== OpenScore ===
In 2017, MuseScore and the International Music Score Library Project (IMSLP) launched a Kickstarter for OpenScore, an initiative to create MuseScore and MusicXML versions of public domain music from IMSLP's library.

OpenScore wants to digitise and liberate all public domain sheet music, including the great classics of Mozart, Beethoven and Bach. Our community aims to transfer history's most influential pieces from paper into interactive scores which you can listen to, edit and share. Together, we can make sheet music accessible to everyone. For free, for any purpose, for evermore.

— OpenScore,

As of December 2020, a number of scores had been completed, including Mozart's Jupiter Symphony, Gluck's Iphigénie en Aulide, Tchaikovsky's 1812 Overture, Holst's The Planets and around 900 songs in the OpenScore Lieder Corpus.

There are several ongoing OpenScore projects which provide Public Domain scores:

- OpenScore – main transcription group
- OpenScore Lieder Corpus – French, German and English song cycles (over 1,300 songs as at 2024)
- OpenScore String Quartets – full score and parts for string quartets (over 100 quartets as at 2024)
- OpenScore Braille – MusicXML score exports for conversion to Braille

== MuseScore.com (Online score sharing) ==
MuseScore

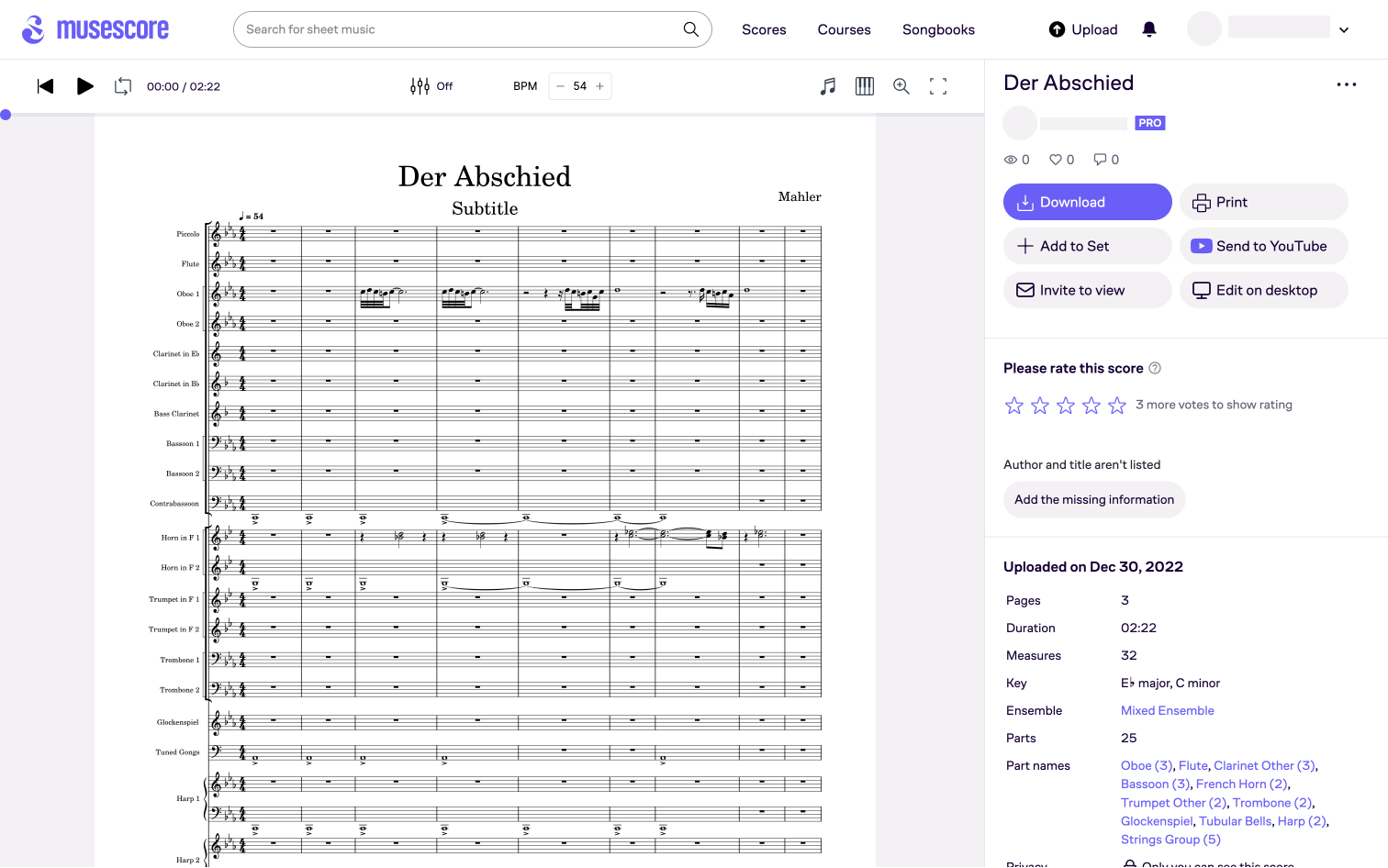
- Screenshot of Musescore.com
- Industry: Music, Entertainment Software
- Revenue: 1.7M
- Website: https://musescore.com
- Advertising: Yes
- Users: > 225,000

The Save Online feature of the MuseScore application allows users to publish and share their music online through MuseScore.com. Initially, MuseScore.com allowed free downloads of scores, free uploads of up to 5 scores, and unlimited uploads for paid accounts.

Starting in 2015 with MuseScore 2.0, its Start Center displays featured scores from the website. This feature is no longer present in MuseScore 4.0.

=== Copyright issues ===
Starting in June 2019, a number of users who uploaded Disney songs were "copyright struck" by Disney. Publisher Hal Leonard was taking down original music, or arrangements of music that was in the public domain, based on song titles. MuseScore.com has since obtained permission to publicly display Disney music on the site, unblocking previously uploaded scores.

In July 2019, following complaints from some copyright holders, MuseScore.com changed its policies so that only paying subscribers could download music sheets. Since MuseScore.com did not have a "trustworthy tool to distinguish songs under copyright from songs available for distribution", this applied to all scores, even those intended for liberal sharing via a Creative Commons license.

In August and September 2019, features were added to allow works to be marked as public domain or original, so they could be made available for free download.

On 19 February 2020, MuseScore.com announced that everyone could now upload an unlimited number of scores, even without subscribing. Subscribers still have access to special features such as Track setup and downloads. MuseScore.com allows playback of a score in any browser supporting the HTML5 audio tag. A score can also be linked to YouTube so that one may follow the sheet music while watching a video of hearing audio featuring the score.

In September 2021, MuseScore.com launched Official Scores, scores licensed from sheet music publishers, available with an additional subscription.

=== Usage statistics ===
As of December 2022, the website hosts 1.3 million scores and averages 300,000 visitors per day. For the year 2023, they claimed at least 450 million score views, 56 million visitors, and 1.35 million added scores.

=== Subscription and billing criticism ===
MuseScore.com has received criticism from some users regarding its subscription and billing practices. Some commentators have described the website’s subscription flow as an example of so-called "dark patterns", referring to interface designs that may encourage users to agree to recurring payments without fully understanding the terms. The company states that subscription terms and automatic renewal conditions are disclosed during checkout.

== See also ==
- List of scorewriters
- Comparison of scorewriters
- Free and open-source software
- List of music software

== Notes ==
1.39 languages are translated over 50%, 70 languages in total
