= Mozart (scorewriter) =

Music notation software

Mozart the Music Processor

- Mozart 14 screenshot
- Original author: David Webber
- Release: 9 November 1994
- Stable release: 17.0.7 / April 2026; 6 months ago
- Written in: C++
- Operating system: Microsoft Windows
- Available in: Czech, Danish, Dutch, English, French, German, Italian, Portuguese, Spanish, Swedish, Welsh
- Type: Scorewriter
- License: Proprietary
- Website: www.mozart.co.uk

Mozart is a proprietary WYSIWYG scorewriter program for Microsoft Windows. It is used to create and edit Western musical notation to create and print sheet music, and to play it via MIDI.

The program was named after the composer Wolfgang Amadeus Mozart.

== History ==
=== Origins ===
Work was started on the software in the late 1980s as a personal project to assist its author in arranging music for the groups in which he played. The model was that of a WYSIWYG word processor, but for music notation. The idea was to be able to type the music as a document, save it in a file, print it as well as play it back through the computer's speakers. Following the advent of the internet, Version 1 was released to the world on 9 November 1994.

=== Development ===
Mozart 1, in 1994, was entirely based on its author's vision of what a music processor should be. Mozart's development in the subsequent decades has been driven by the needs of its users. Elaine Gould's 2011 book, Behind Bars, is the primary guide to developing and maintaining music engraving in Mozart, as it is for other score writers.

=== Timeline ===
Since the initial release in 1994, new major versions have been released regularly. Intermediate free service packs are issued as needed.

- 1994: Mozart 1 – a 16 bit program for Windows 3.1
- 1996: Mozart 2 – a 32 bit program for Windows 95
- 1997–2001: Mozart 3 – Mozart 6
- 2002: Mozart Viewer/Reader is released: a free program which will view, print, and play Mozart (.mz) files
- 2003: Mozart 7
- 2004: Mozart 8 – aka Mozart 2005
- 2006–09: Mozart 9, 10
- 2010: The Mozart Jazz Font is introduced
- 2011: Mozart 11 - imports MusicXML
- 2014: Mozart 12 - also exports MusicXML
- 2016: Mozart 13 – introduces the ribbon bar interface
- 2018: Mozart 14 – automates proportional spacing
- 2020: Mozart 15 – symbols, rendering, interface improvements
- 2022: Mozart 16 – playback dynamic changes over long notes, arpeggiation scope and timing
- 2025: Mozart 17 – score and parts linked in a single document, cue staves, figured bass, ambitus, instrument range

== Features ==
=== Interface ===
- Score entry by computer keyboard, mouse, on-screen piano keyboard, external MIDI instrument.
- Extensive set of keyboard shortcuts with additional customisable mapping.
- Programmable through macros.
- Import: MusicXML, NIFF, abc, MIDI (.MID, .RMI, .KAR).
- Export: MusicXML, abc, MIDI (.MID, .RMI, .KAR), images including BMP, GIF, PNG, JPEG, TIFF, EMF.
- Help: extensive, context-sensitive help system.

=== Score and instrumentation ===
- An extensible library of score templates.
- Support for a large collection of transposing instruments.
- Support for tablature notation, chord symbols, chord shapes, and percussion.
- Support for a number of plucked string instruments (i.a. guitar, banjo, ukulele, lute, tamburitza) in various tunings.
- Score can be shown in concert pitch, written pitch, B♭ pitch.
- Transposition to any key.
- Extraction of parts from a score.

=== Music entry ===
- Clefs include treble, bass, alto, tenor, percussion, tablature, and others.
- Time signatures automatically respected in the music.
- Key signatures from 7 flats to 7 sharps and changes with optional cancelling naturals.
- Repeated accidentals automatically respected.
- Optional courtesy accidentals.
- Cross- and diamond-shaped note heads, cue notes.
- Enharmonic transformations involving (♭, ♮, ♯,).
- Lyrics attached to notes.
- Figured bass
- All text items support Unicode characters.
- Text entry has keyboard shortcuts for accented characters and symbols.

=== Play-back ===
- Playback optionally with tracking cursor.
- Playback follows repeats and redirections.
- Playback obeys dynamics, pedal marks, phrasing, rubato, and articulation including tremolo and reiteration.

=== Miscellaneous ===
- Mozart 10 Gold-certified to run under Wine-1.1.36 on Slackware Linux 12.1.
- Support for foot pedal page turners.

== Limitations ==
- No macOS support.
- Limited control over MIDI events.
- Time signature must be common to all parallel staves.
- No Gregorian chant notation.
- No quarter tone or other microtonal notations.
- No handbell support.
- Minimal support for extended techniques and contemporary notations.

== See also ==
- Music engraving
- Scorewriter
- Comparison of scorewriters
- List of music software
