= The Note Processor (software) =

1987 music notation software

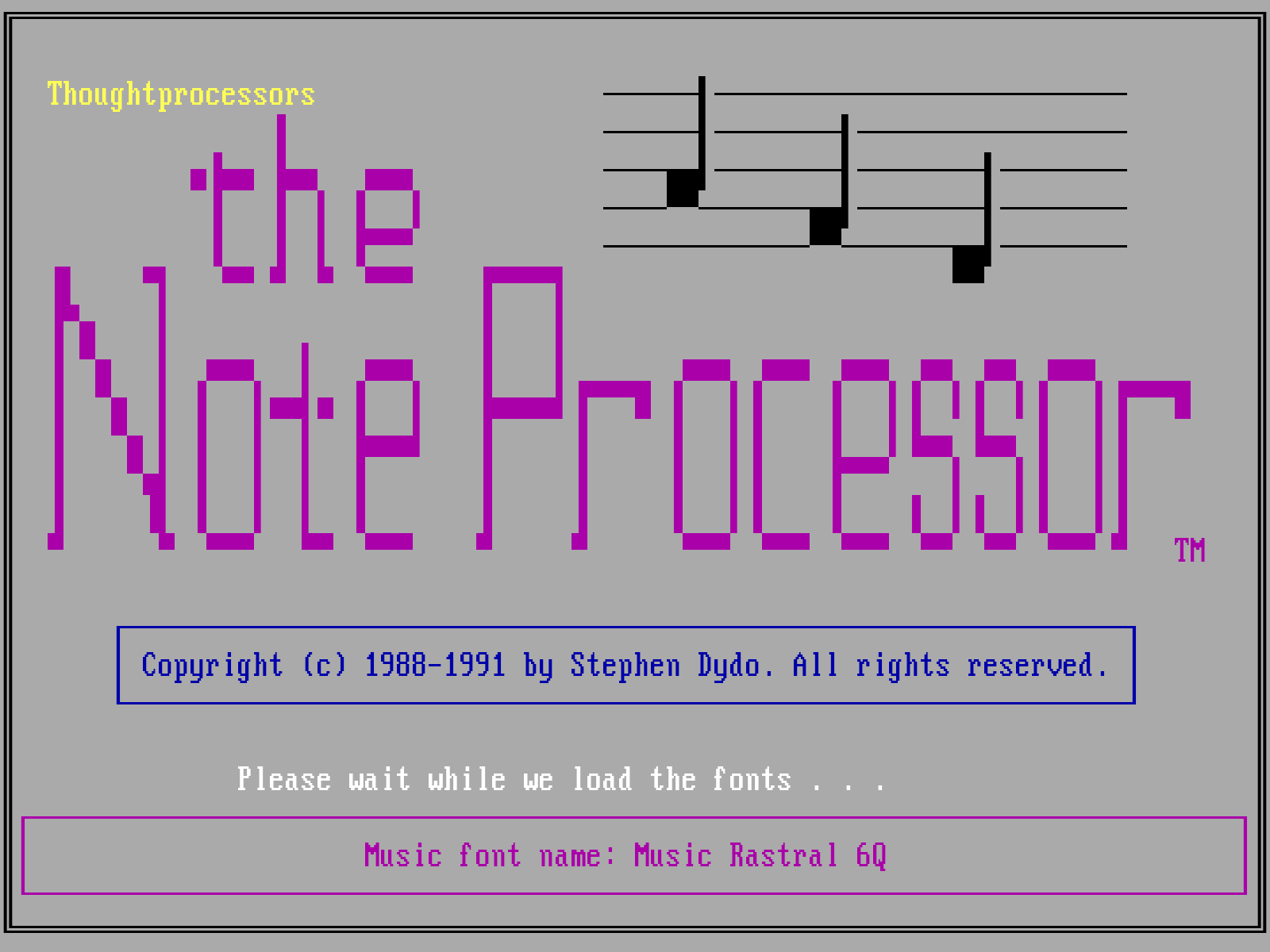
- Original author: Stephen Dydo
- Developer: ThoughtProcessors
- Initial release: 1987; 39 years ago
- Final release: 2.3 / 1991; 35 years ago
- Operating system: MS-DOS
- Platform: PC
- Available in: English
- Type: Scorewriter
- License: Proprietary

The Note Processor is a scorewriter program written by Stephen Dydo and released in 1987 for the IBM PC. Intended to provide publishing-quality music engraving, it was unique among commercial scorewriters in that it accepted as input files encoded in DARMS notation. It also took input from MIDI files, and files could be created and edited within the program using the keyboard and mouse.

== Version 1 ==
The screen editor of The Note Processor

Begun in 1981 while Dydo was working at the Institute of Sonology at Utrecht University, initial release was slated for autumn 1987 and first noted in the Computer Music Journal in late 1988. Costing $595, version 1 had a character set of 175 symbols in six sizes of music fonts, and additional text fonts. It could handle scores of up to 50 staves, part extraction, and could print to both dot matrix and laser printers, as well as create the then-standard TIFF graphics file. Music could be saved either in DARMS notation (losing most fine layout), or in the Note Processor proprietary Intermediate Code (which retained most layout).

Nicholas Cook and Malcolm Butler, in their review of notation software for the IBM market, remarked of version 1.3 that the inability to alter slur shape was a flaw, as was the difficulty of selecting score items using the mouse, and the lack of undo. Cross-staff beams had to be entered as graphical elements between quarter notes. They noted that using the screen editor was not an efficient method of entering music (it was really only useful for making minor modifications and previewing the layout), and that any alterations made in the screen editor were not saved either in DARMS or Intermediate Code. They also noted the difference between Note-Processor DARMS and Canonical-DARMS, and that there was no means of editing DARMS code within the program (users had to leave Note Processor, run WordPerfect, edit and save the file, close WordPerfect, and run Note Processor again). They concluded it provided a valuable editing and printing facility for DARMS users, but was not yet well-adapted for the casual user.

== Version 2 ==
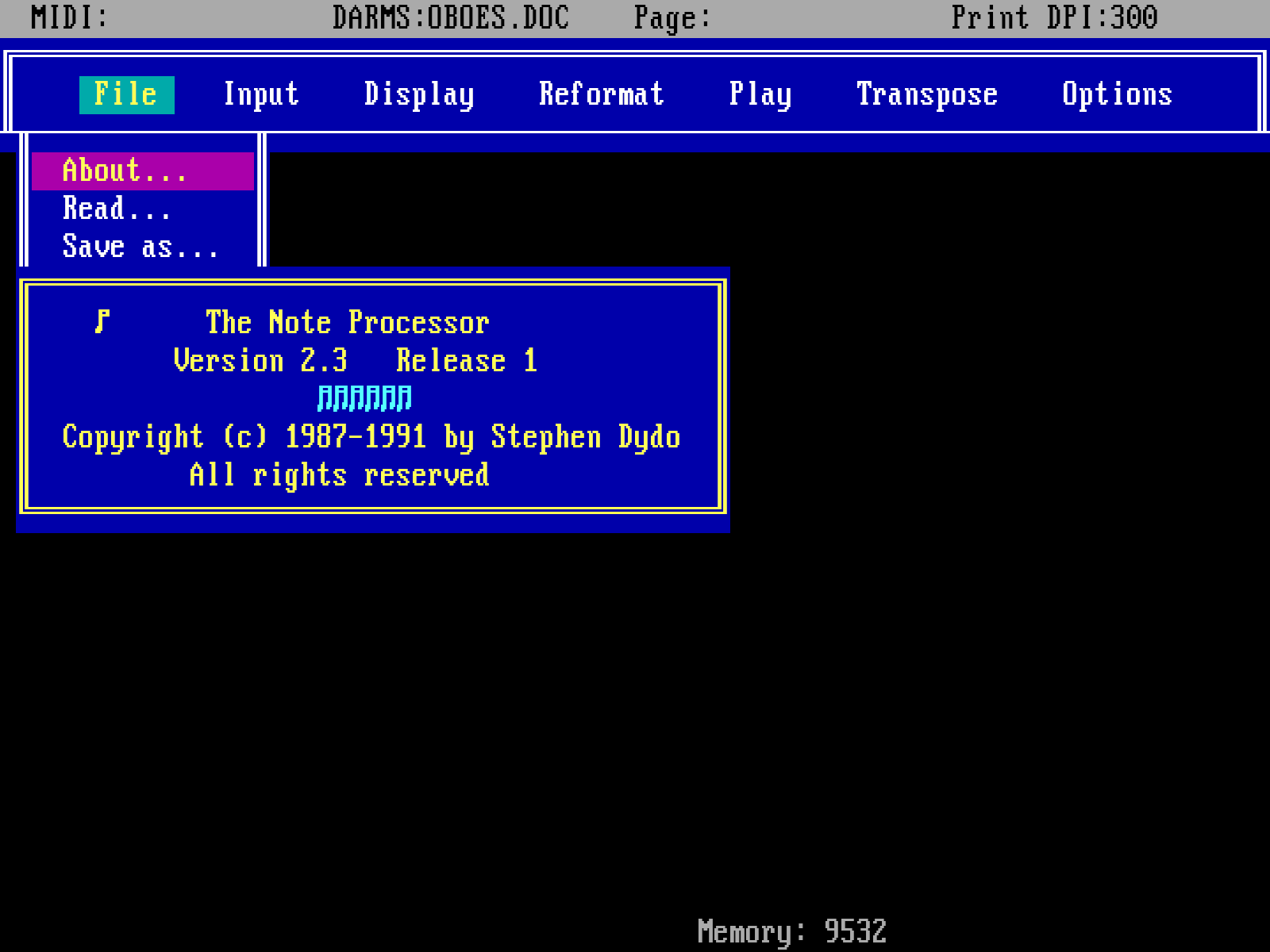
The Note Processor Main Interface

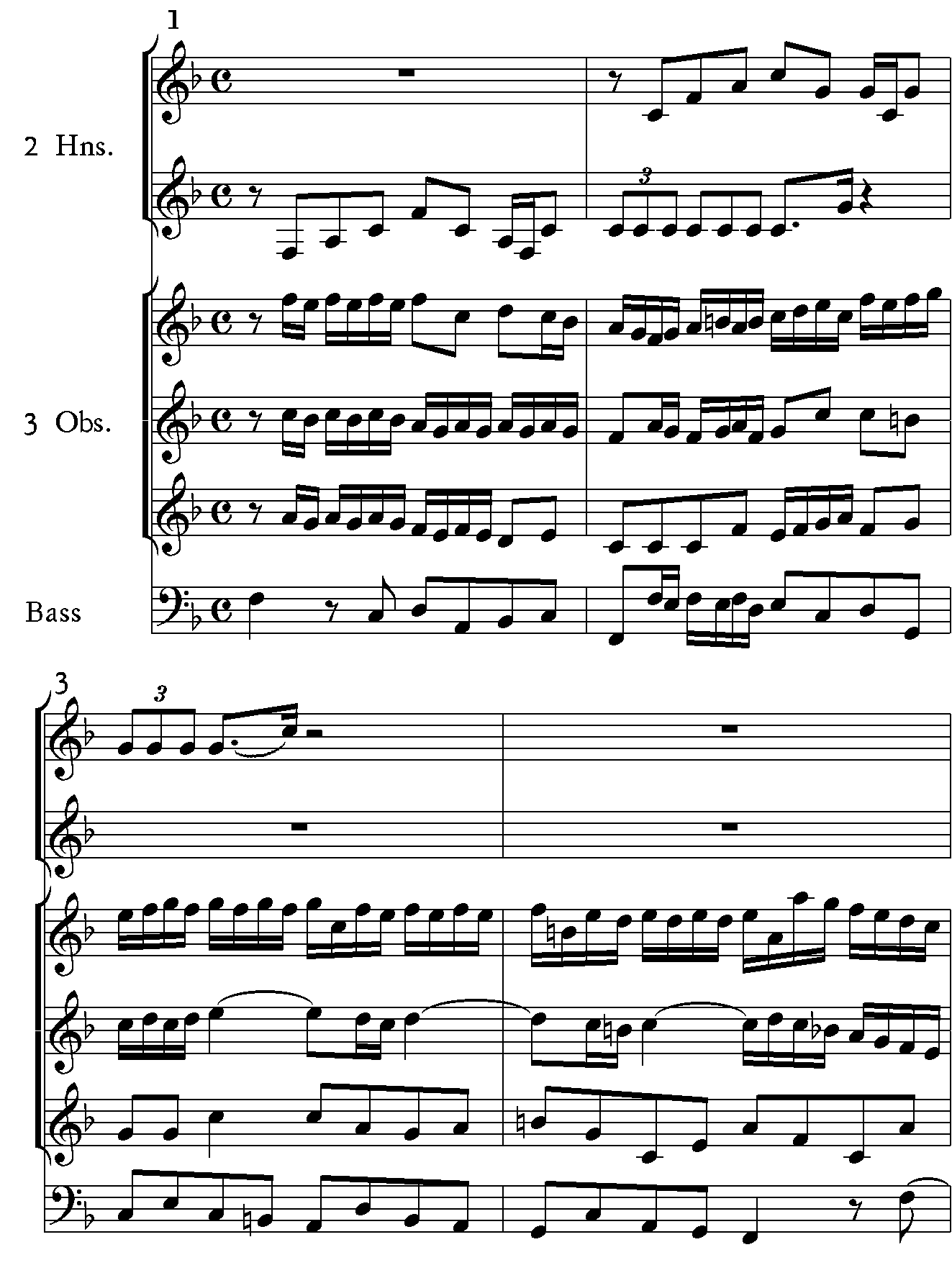
Bach's Brandenburg Concerto No. 1 engraved by The Note Processor, output as TIFF and converted to PNG

Reviewing Version 2 (which retailed for $295 in 1990), Garrett Bowles complimented the 120-page User's Guide and 37-page tutorial, but noted the program had no online help. It could read and write single-track MIDI files as well as play via the computer's internal speaker. Four sizes of music font were provided: Pearl (corresponding to a rastral size of 8), Kleine Mittel (rastral 6), Peter (rastral 4), and Maho (rastral 2) (the names come from the 19th century German engraving tradition) plus cue-size. The character set contained 242 glyphs. Operations on more than one item at a time were not possible, this had to be done by editing the DARMS file. 32 additional user-defined symbols could be added by using the program 'The Engraver's Font Set' which was sold for $95. Available text fonts were Garamond in roman, bold, and italic at 11 and 12 points. Bowles also found automatic transposition to be reliable and to make the required adjustments to stems, beams, and slurs. Each Note Processor file contains the score for a single instrument (also known as a part); scores are created by stacking parts, and providing layout information at the time of printing. Bowles recommended the package for users who needed the DARMS input, but found the program to be unintuitive and complex.

Version 2.1 came out in late 1990 and provided native a native VGA mode, 8-track MIDI sequencer, internal DARMS code editor, and online help. Versions 2.2 and 2.3 came out in 1991.

Note Processor DARMS was codified by Dydo in the book Beyond MIDI in 1997, including full listings of the character sets. He also noted the optical recognition program MusicReader by William McGee and Paul Merkley could create NP-DARMS files.
