= Behind Bars (book) =

2011 music notation book

Behind Bars: The Definitive Guide to Music Notation
- Author: Elaine Gould
- Publisher: Faber Music
- Publication date: 2011
- Pages: 704
- ISBN: 978-0-5715-1456-4

Behind Bars: The Definitive Guide to Music Notation is a 2011 book on music engraving by Elaine Gould, a senior editor at Faber & Faber.

== Structure ==
The book is divided into three main sections.

1. General conventions
  - Deals with the basic rules and principles of notation, applying to most situations.
2. Idiomatic notation
  - Discusses instrument-specific conventions and rules of notation.
3. Layout and presentation
  - Dictates the layout of entire pages and scores, with chapters on electroacoustic and aleatoric music.

== Behind Bars: General Conventions ==
12 years after the publication of the original Behind Bars, Faber released the first section of the book, "General conventions", as a standalone publication, titled simply Behind Bars: General Conventions. It was recommended as "the perfect complement to any reference collection" by Philip Rothman of the Scoring Notes blog.
