= SMuFL =

Open standard for music font mapping

- Standard Music Font Layout
- First published: 31 January 2013
- Latest version: 1.4; 20 March 2021
- Organization: W3C
- Committee: W3C Music Notation Community Group
- Editors: Daniel Spreadbury
- License: W3C Community Final Specification Agreement
- Website: www.smufl.org

Standard Music Font Layout, or SMuFL, is an open standard for Unicode private use area music font mapping. The standard was originally developed by Daniel Spreadbury of Steinberg for its scorewriter software Dorico, but is now developed and maintained by the W3C Music Notation Community Group, along with the standard for MusicXML (which, itself, supports SMuFL).

SMuFL is a substantial development beyond the previous de facto mapping standard created by Cleo Huggins in the Sonata font she designed for Adobe in 1985 (which was Adobe's first original typeface).

Numerous scorewriters support SMuFL (as of June 2021, these include Dorico, Finale and MuseScore but not LilyPond or Sibelius) and a number of free and commercial SMuFL-compliant fonts are available.

Bravura, designed by Daniel Spreadbury of Steinberg for Dorico and initially released in 2013, is the SMuFL reference font.

== Support ==
SMuFL support was added to the leading scorewriters in the following versions:

- MuseScore from version 2.0 in 2015
- Dorico from version 1.0.0 in 2016
- Finale from version 27 in 2021
