= Handorf =

- Municipality
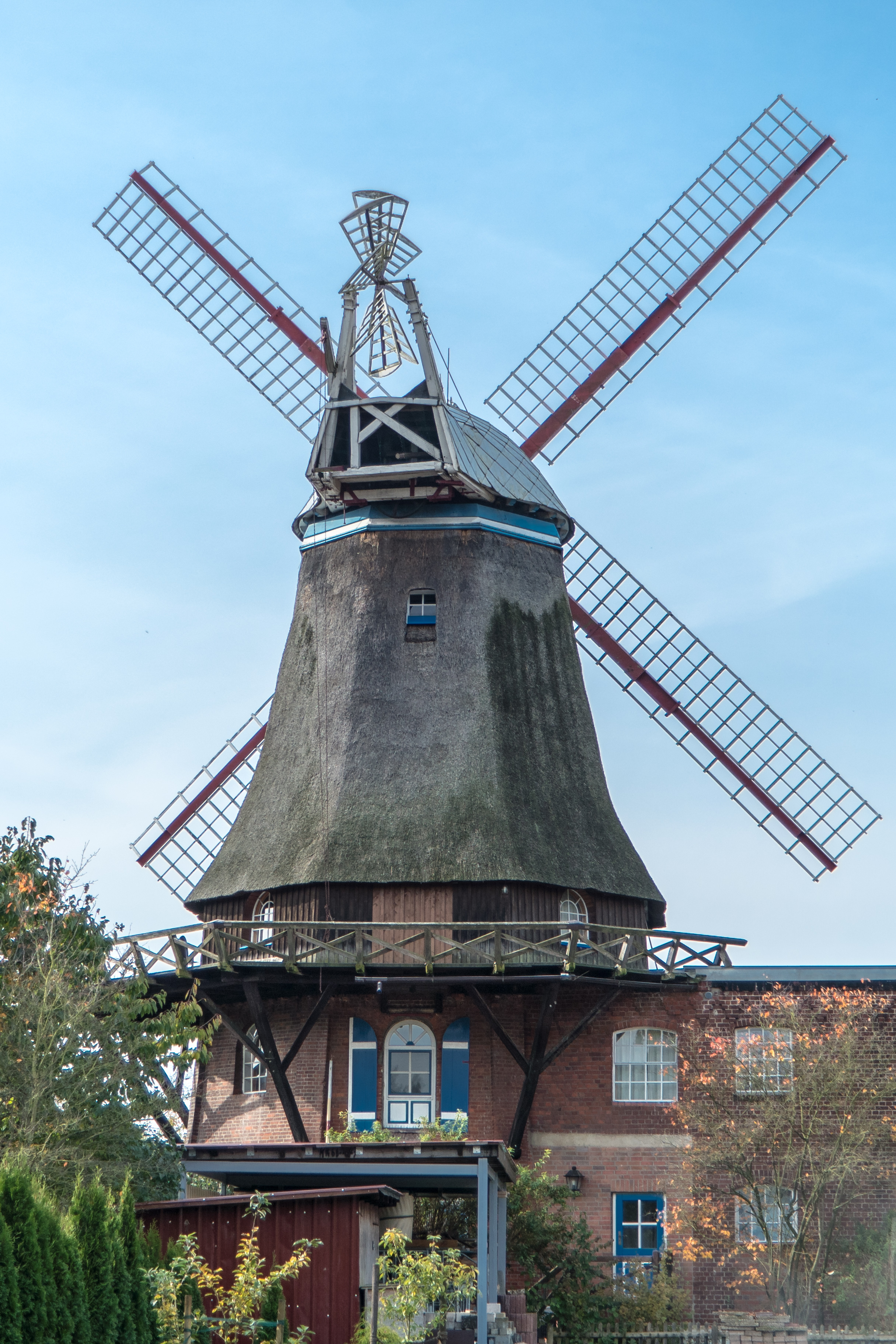

- Coat of arms

- Location of Handorf within Lüneburg district
- Interactive map of Handorf
- Location within Germany Location within Lower Saxony
- Coordinates: 53°21′N 10°20′E
- Country: Germany
- State: Lower Saxony
- District: Lüneburg
- Municipal assoc.: Bardowick

Government
  - Mayor: Peter Herm (CDU)

Area
  - Total: 9.75 km^{2} (3.76 sq mi)
- Elevation: 3 m (9.8 ft)

Population (2025-12-31)
  - Total: 2,104
  - Density: 216/km^{2} (559/sq mi)
- Time zone: UTC+01:00 (CET)
  - Summer (DST): UTC+02:00 (CEST)
- Postal codes: 21447
- Dialling codes: 04133
- Vehicle registration: LG

Handorf is a municipality in the district of Lüneburg, in Lower Saxony, Germany.

The headquarters of the music publishing company Lugert Verlag GmbH who produce the Forte scorewriter program are located in the municipality.
