= Early notation typesetter =

Scorewriter

Early Notation Typesetter (ENT)
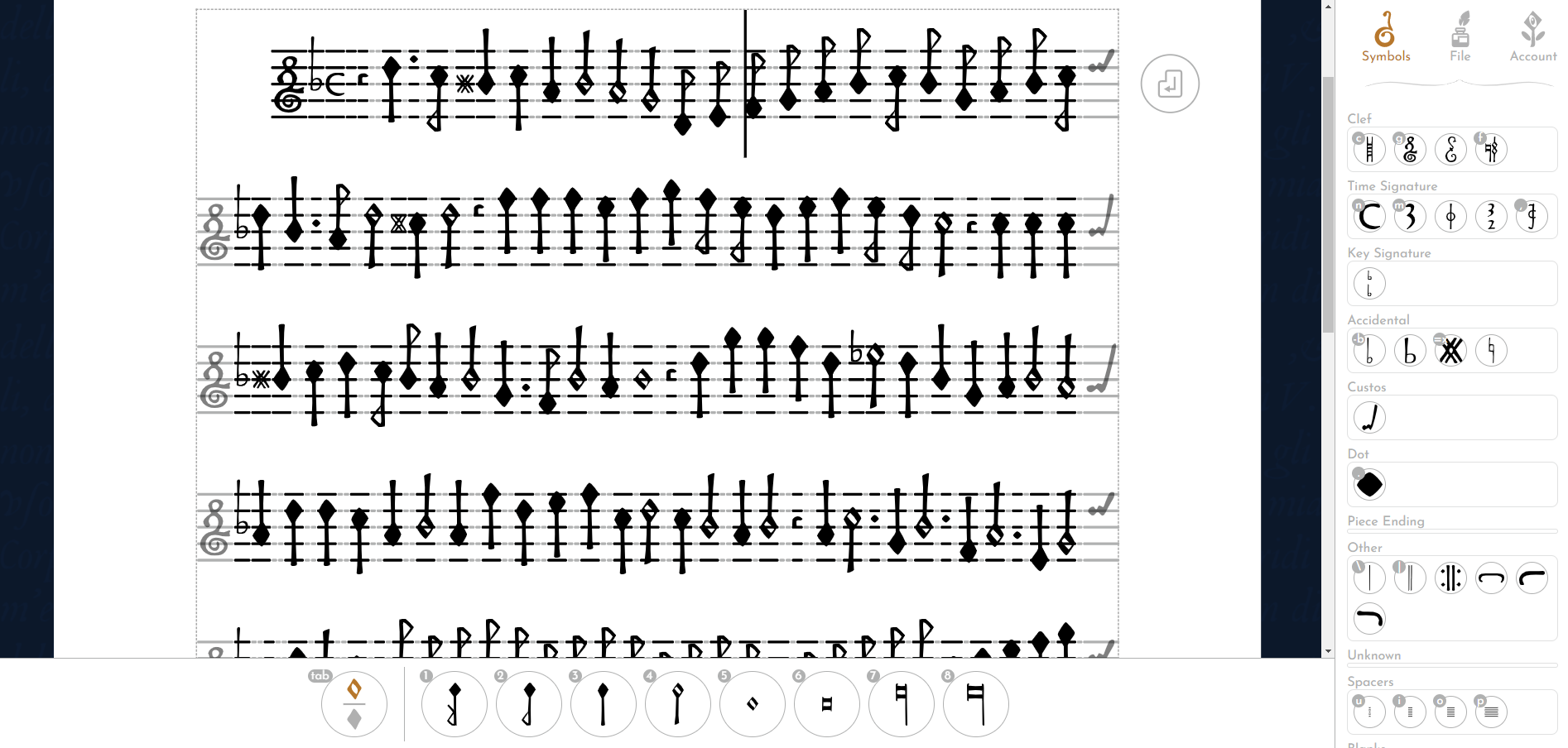
- Early Notation Typesetter User Interface (Alpha 0.9.6)
- Developer(s): Versilian Studios LLC. (Samuel Gossner, Daniel West, Dieter Theuns)
- Preview release: 0.9.6 / 20 October 2020; 4 years ago
- Operating system: Windows, macOS, Linux
- Type: Scorewriter
- License: Proprietary
- Website: typesetter.earlynotation.com

ENT is a scorewriter designed to re-typeset mensural notation from 1500 to 1650.

== History ==
ENT was developed to facilitate the clean re-typesetting of single, dual, and triple process typeset mensural notation after developer Samuel Gossner spent several weeks attempting to clean a facsimile scan using the brush tool in image editing software. Gossner enlisted the help of programmer Daniel West and designer Dieter Theuns, with whom he had worked on Airscape: The Fall of Gravity as composer five years prior.

== Features ==
ENT runs in the browser, using JavaScript and TypeScript. It is compatible with Google Chrome, Mozilla Firefox, and Chromium-based Microsoft Edge.

ENT can export PDF files, and saves and loads JSON-based .ent files to preserve notation for later editing.

The program uses both mouse and keyboard entry, alternately or in unison, to achieve music entry. The staff is generated with each glyph, and advances across the page as glyphs are entered. When the user is finished with a line, the program automatically justifies the line with spacer units and places custodes automatically based on the following line.

The user may select from a variety of music fonts, traced from facsimiles in SVG format. Each font is named after a different publisher, for example 'Phalese' is named after Petrus Phalesius the Younger, facsimiles of whose publications were used to create the font. Fonts are organized as collections of SVG files, organized by a JSON control file, inspired by the structure of SFZ virtual instruments.

== See also ==
- List of music software
