= MusicEase =

Music notation software

- Original author: Gary Rader
- Initial release: 1987
- Stable release: 10.1m / November 2024; 1 year ago
- Operating system: Microsoft Windows, macOS
- Available in: English
- Type: Musical notation
- License: standard version: CC BY-NC-ND 4.0; professional version: commercial
- Website: musicease.com

MusicEase is a WYSIWYG scorewriter created by Gary Rader and produced by MusicEase Software (formerly known as Grandmaster). It enables computers using Microsoft Windows and macOS to produce musical notation and listen to them in MIDI.

== History ==
MusicEase was initially created under MS-DOS using muLisp The first version appeared in 1987 and was completely controlled by the keyboard. In 1995, a Windows version was created using Allegro Common Lisp. Toolbars and mouse support were then added. During the ensuing years, additional functionality was added as new versions were produced. Around 2010 Mac and Windows versions were created using LispWorks. In February, 2024, the standard version of MusicEase was released free to the general public under Creative Commons license BY-NC-ND 4.0.

== Functionality ==
MusicEase is both a music score editor and an automatic accompaniment generator. As a score editor, the user can create, edit, play and print high quality music notation. The user sees on the computer screen the musical score exactly as it will be printed out. As an automatic accompaniment creator/generator, it allows the user to quickly create accompaniment styles using the full range of notational functionality and to easily apply a style to a melody to add an accompaniment consisting of any number of general MIDI instruments, including drums.

MusicEase is a constraint-based system with a large amount of knowledge of music notation. This allows it to handle intelligently many of the details of scoring automatically. For instance, bar lines are inserted automatically according to the current meter (time signature). If the user changes the time signature, the bar line placements change automatically, and beam scopes are automatically recomputed as directed by the new time signature. (Users can also insert barlines themselves wherever they like.) Slurs and phrase marks can often be inserted with a single keystroke combination. The end points, shape, direction and location (above or below the included notes) are automatically determined. The result is that users can create professional looking scores easily and quickly without knowing music engraving/music copyist rules. (Generally, no one can create engraver quality printed music without having explicitly been trained in music copyist techniques. And incorrectly notated music is harder for trained musicians to play.)

Jerry Pournelle, reviewer for Byte Magazine, says The samples [of music printouts from MusicEase] I have seen, and a couple I have produced, are sure in the same league as hand engraved.

Since many people are familiar with word processors, the notation aspect of MusicEase is designed to work much like a word processing program. For instance, pressing the G key enters the note G. Pressing the Delete key (Mac) or Backspace key (Windows) then deletes this note. Pressing the Enter key begins a new system. Pressing the Delete key (Mac) or Backspace key (Windows) at the beginning of a system appends it to the previous system. Blocks can be cut from one location and pasted into another location and then everything can be reformatted with just several keystrokes (using MusicEase's cast-off function which redetermines system breaks so that the density of notes in each system is roughly the same followed by the justify function to stretch/shrink all staves so they horizontally span from the left margin to the right margin). Most functions are invoked via key presses which allows fast content entry as opposed to using the mouse to drag music notational elements from palettes to staves which generally requires more effort.

MusicEase supports a number of additional generally useful functions such as true transposition (as opposed to just shifting existing configurations up or down on the staff), part extraction (any combination of system staves can be extracted), scaling of the music to a large range of sizes, inverting or retrograding selected blocks of notes, combining 2 staves containing single voices into a single staff containing mixed single and double stemmed voicing and vice versa (splitting a single staff with several voices into 2 separate staves, each containing a single voice), automatically adding chord fret diagrams, using any computer fonts for verses, titles, etc., unicode text support, and displaying music as tablature and/or as shape notes (4 or 7 shape systems --- the shapes associated with scale degrees can be fully customized).

== Most notable features ==
- Fast score entry by computer keyboard
- Automatically positions most common music notational elements correctly, so the user need not know music engraving rules
- Library of predefined templates
- Transposable guitar chords
- Keyboard shortcuts for many common notational elements
- Programmable through macros
- Import MusicXML, ABC, MIDI
- Part extraction
- Retrograde and Inversion of user designated portions of notes to facilitate composing
- Playback
- Cast off (re-determination of system breaks so each system has roughly the same density - somewhat analogous to paragraph reformatting in word processing programs except the last system must as dense as the others)
- Handbell music notation
- Easily switch between shape note (4 or 7 shape) and normal round noteheads
- Automatic justification
- Automatic accompaniment creation and style definition
- Automatic chord-name setting for simple melodies
- Tablature notation for guitars and mandolins

== Free version ==
- Free viewer/player/printer; standard version

== Prominent uses ==
MusicEase was used by University of Colorado at Boulder Professor Emeritus of Music Karl Kroeger to create much of the music in Music of the New American Nation - Sacred Music from 1780 to 1820, for which he was the main editor. Professor Kroeger states, In particular, I acknowledge my debt to Gary M. Rader, developer of the MusicEase music notation software used for the musical scores.

MusicEase Software's Christian Virtual Hymnal 20K, providing transposable, customizable sheet music for over 20,000 public domain standard notation and shape note hymns is leveraged on the functionality of MusicEase. (Read about the Christian Virtual Hymnal 20K in Technologies for Worship Magazine.) All music in the Christian Virtual Hymnal 20K was created using MusicEase. The Christian Virtual Hymnal 20K newly supports the import of custom choral music created with MusicEase Professional. Such music is then generally amenable to all the functionality/customizations provided to built-in music. Conversely the Christian Virtual Hymnal 20K supports export to the MusicEase file format. Such exported music can then be fully edited within MusicEase.

MusicEase Software's HymnWrite also uses the MusicEase notation engine to drive its functionality. HymnWrite allows users to create new hymns by simply providing the text (title, verses, author, etc.) for the hymn and then choosing a tune from over 5,000 possible tunes to combine with the text. The result is a publication quality piece of music comparable to those found in modern day hymnals.

Integrity Music, a major publisher of praise-worship music, used this functionality of MusicEase for the transposable sheet music versions of many of its products: e.g., the CD-Rom versions of its Hosanna! Music songbooks, versions 3 and 4 of its Worship Software, music available via its worshipleaderassistant.com and Worship Kitchen websites, and various iWorship CD-Rom songbooks.

The "Shout Music Manager" by Media Shout included this functionality to provide transposable, customizable printed music.

== See also ==
- Music engraving
- Scorewriter
- List of music software
