= Airscape: The Fall of Gravity =

2015 video game

- Developer(s): Cross-Product
- Publisher(s): EQ Games
- Programmer(s): Daniel West
- Artist(s): Claudia Starke, Dieter Theuns
- Composer(s): Sam Gossner
- Platform(s): Windows
- Release: August 11, 2015
- Genre(s): Platform

Airscape: The Fall of Gravity is 2D platform game developed by Australian studio Cross-Product and published by EQ Games in 2015 for Microsoft Windows. The player is in the role of an octopus navigating through a world of aliens, trying to save fellow sea critters from an unknown evil character.

== Gameplay ==
Most of the levels are divided into zones, with each zone being unlocked when critters from the previous zones levels are saved.

== Reception ==
Airscape: The Fall of Gravity received generally favourable reviews collated on Metacritic for PC, receiving a total score of 75/100.
