= MusiCAD =

Music notation software

- Original author: Musys Software
- Initial release: September 1994; 31 years ago
- Stable release: 4.0 / 1 May 2015; 11 years ago
- Written in: C++
- Operating system: Windows
- Available in: 3 languages
- List of languages Dutch, English, German
- Type: Scorewriter
- License: Proprietary
- Website: en.musicad.eu

MusiCAD is a scorewriter program originally designed for folk music featuring irregular meter (like 7/8 or 13/16) and automatically generated accompaniment voices (bass/chords) from chord symbols and specified time signature. Created lead sheets are audibly verifiable. One of its design goals was to be as predictable as possible: 'what-you-write-is-what-you'll-hear'. The resulting music engraving is the result of the notes used and an applied set of rules (note sizes etc.) that determine how notes should be drawn. After changing the layout parameters or after transpose the (new) rules are applied, perhaps changing page layout completely.

The name MusiCAD is a portmanteau of music and computer-aided design.

The MS-DOS and Dutch-only 1.65 version has been available since 1994. Version 2.0 added support for multi-voice score editing. Later versions do not focus that much on folk music anymore and will allow up to 32 voices as well as percussion notation. The 3.0 version is available for Microsoft Windows and in Dutch, English and German. Like a few other scorewriters, it uses plain ASCII files for storage. MusiCAD will read and write ABC-notation as well as MIDI, and is capable of writing PDF-files for easy distribution of scores. There is an unlimited-time evaluation mode which allows storing and printing. Version 4 adds (among others) UTF-8, MusicXML import/export.

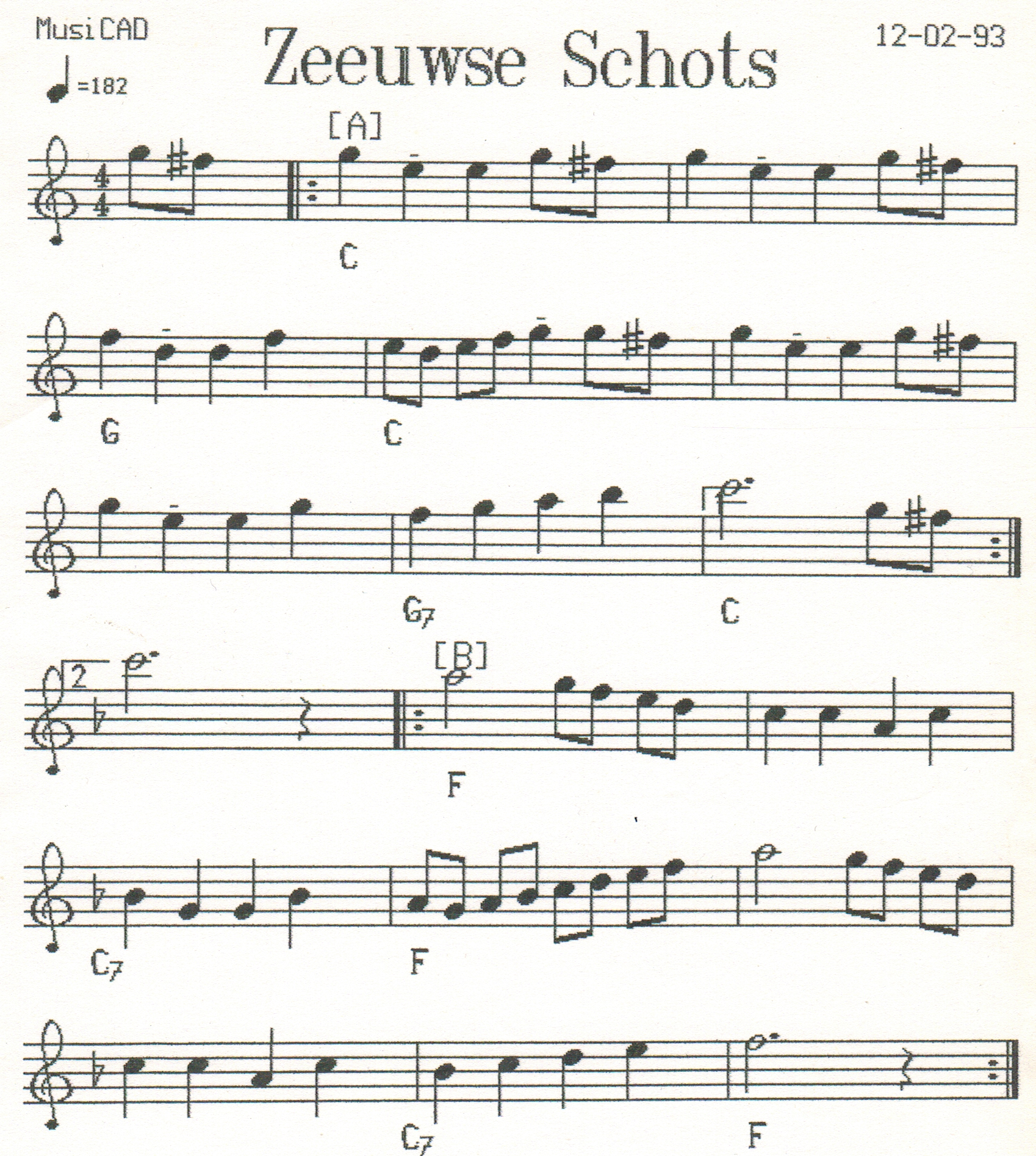
Score printed using MusiCAD version 1

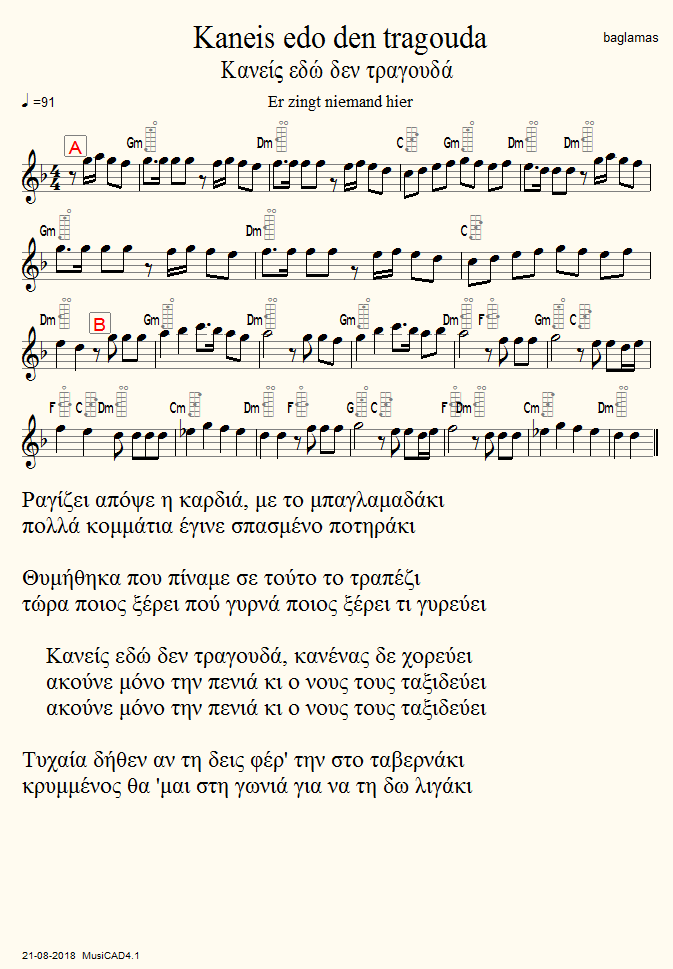
Score printed using MusiCAD version 4

== See also ==
- List of music software
