= MusicPrinter Plus =

DOS-based scorewriter program

Startup screen

MusicPrinter Plus is a scorewriter program for MS-DOS created by Temporal Acuity Products.

== History ==
Music Printer Plus was developed by Dr. Jack Jarrett. It grew out of earlier work on a piece of software called Music Printer that ran on IBM PC and compatibles computers. It was first released in 1988 and was discontinued in 1995. Although a Windows version was planned, one was not developed. Plans for the Windows version evolved into Dr. Jarrett's current project Notion. In 1989, version 2 retailed for $395

== Capabilities ==
MusicPrinter Plus 1.1 being used to engrave Debussy's Clair de Lune

MusicPrinter Plus contained some advanced mechanisms for its day, including playback of articulations and synchronization to SMPTE and other time code.

Reviewing version 2 in 1990, Garrett Bowles commended the manual, help screens, and text handling, but criticised its limited spacing adjustments and that documents were limited to 64KB, or around 200 staves.

Version 4.2, selling for $595 in 1991, supported laser printers, and was considered to have a 'stunningly logical' interface, the 'best-written manual' and excellent technical support.
