= Notation Composer =

Scorewriter and music sequencer

- Original authors: Mark Walsen; Reinhold Hoffmann and others
- Developer: Notation Software Germany
- Initial release: 1994; 32 years ago
- Stable release: 5.1.4 / 15 April 2026; 1 day ago
- Operating system: Microsoft Windows with Wine macOS, Ubuntu
- Available in: 4 languages
- List of languages English, German, Italian, Spanish
- Type: Scorewriter (Music notation)
- License: Proprietary software
- Website: www.notation.com

Notation Composer is primarily a scorewriter and music sequencer software that is developed and released by Notation Software Germany for Microsoft Windows and with Wine for macOS, Linux Ubuntu and other Linux distributions.

== History ==
Notation Composer was initially developed by Notation Software, Inc. a corporation licensed in the State of Washington of the United States founded and established by Mark Walsen in 1994. The first version was originally released as MidiNotate Composer, with the intent to make the process of composing and arranging easy for "everyday musicians". The version 2 release of the program changed the name to Notation Composer to more closely associate the name with the parent company.

After the transition of ownership of Notation Software in 2013, Notation Composer has been further developed by Notation Software Germany GmbH under the leadership of Reinhold Hoffmann, musician and CEO of the company.
