= Overture (software) =

Music notation software

- Screenshot of the Overture v.5 workspace in score view mode, showing the score and data view controls (top left), score editing window (center), symbol palettes (left), playback controls (top center), and track and playback data pane (right). The score shown is an excerpt from G.F. Handel's Ode for the Birthday of Queen Anne
- Original author: Don Williams
- Developer: Sonic Scores (Formerly called GenieSoft)
- Release: 1994; 32 years ago
- Stable release: Version 5.6.3-3 / Date not listed. (Release date of a prior version 5.6.1.1 was December 2, 2019; 6 years ago)
- Operating system: macOS, Microsoft Windows
- Available in: 5 languages
- List of languages Chinese, English, French, Norwegian, Spanish
- Type: Scorewriter, Hybrid DAW
- License: Proprietary
- Website: sonicscores.com/overture/

Overture is a music notation (scorewriter) program for Windows and Macintosh platforms, published and developed by Sonic Scores. While Overture is primarily a scorewriter program, it also allows editing the score's MIDI audio playback data in the manner of sequencer and digital audio workstation (DAW) software.

To facilitate film scoring, Overture has the ability to play film video footage synchronized to the score playback, and to insert precise time markers into the score.

Overture was the first scorewriter to feature full Virtual Studio Technology (VST) hosting, allowing audio playback of the score with virtual instruments, controlled by the program's mixing-desk style interface.

== Editing and note entry ==
=== Editing ===
When Overture was developed, the developer aimed to retain Encore's previous user-friendly interface design, but included the ability to notate elements regarded as complex at that time. These included adjustable engraver spacings between elements, non-standard notehead shapes, varying numbers of staff lines, guitar fingering charts, and tablature notation. Each line of drum staves could be user-mapped to different percussion instruments. It was also the first music scorewriter software that gave users control over all MIDI playback data such as note velocity, pitch bend and duration.

Most notational symbols can be repositioned by dragging them with the mouse. Most other editing of notational symbols is performed by selecting the symbols using the mouse, and selecting the appropriate editing command from a menu or by clicking on a palette. Overture 5 and higher supports editing and page navigation, such as pinch-to-zoom, using one's fingers or a stylus on touch screens.

=== Note entry ===
In Overture, input of note data can be done by any of several methods: via an onscreen virtual piano keyboard; via the computer keyboard; directly onto the staves with the mouse; or with a MIDI keyboard. MIDI keyboard note entry may be done by playing pitches singly ("step entry") or by real-time recording. For keyboard or mouse step entry, note lengths are selected from a palette or via the numeric keys (for example, pressing 4 selects quarter notes, pressing 8 selects eighth notes). Computer keyboard note entry in Overture 5 is performed by typing the letter name of the musical pitches (optionally followed by the Enter key, depending on user settings), followed by the letter "o" or "O" if an octave change upwards or downwards, respectively, is required.

=== Audio Editing ===
Screenshot of Overture v.5 in Data View mode, running on Mac OS 10.11. Data View allows setup of audio playback parameters for the score's tracks and individual notes. Instruments for each track are selected in the Instrument Library pane (left). Each track has a mixer-desk style control for volume, panning, mute and solo, and a graphical representation of each measure of music (upper center). In the lower center pane of the workspace, parameters such as note velocities, pitch bend and after-touch can be edited on the selectable scrolling piano roll view or stave view, with an editable graph of the parameter of each note appearing below it. The right hand pane allows the playback effect of score articulation marks to be edited. Playback controls are shown at the top center.

The software enables graphical editing of all MIDI audio playback data (such as duration, loudness, pitch bend, sustain, attack/decay time, and breath control) for each individual note. This can be done either on the score itself, or via a scrolling view in the style of a DAW. MIDI data is displayed as a scrolling piano roll view, alongside either a piano keyboard, or treble and bass staves.

== Background and Development ==
In the early 1990s, the music notation software market was dominated by the Finale program, published by Coda. It was capable of handling large, complicated scores and non-traditional notation. However, its immense power and flexibility came at the expense of a "complex user interface".

Other notation programs with different interfaces were eventually developed, including Encore, written by the author of Overture, Don Williams Encore featured the ability to add notes by simply selecting the note value on a palette and placing it in the required position on a staff; most notational elements could also be selected with the mouse, but unlike Finale, at the time, Encore was unable to handle many unconventional notation elements.

In 1994, Professor Alan Belkin of the University of Montreal published a study of notation software available at the time (dominated by programs for Macintosh). Among other things, it described the advantages and disadvantages of the mouse- and keyboard-driven approaches to notation-interface design, which he exemplified referring to Encore and Finale, respectively, and other software packages.

On its release in 1994, Overture's interface combined features of two of Williams' earlier software projects: Overture's score interface resembled Encore; with its MIDI data editing view resembling the piano-roll view of Master Tracks Pro. Later versions allow viewing the piano roll alongside either a visual piano keyboard, or treble and bass staves.

Graphic MIDI Data Window in an early version of Overture (version 3.6 running on Mac OS 9). The violin 1 part of Pachelbel's Canon appears in this MIDI editor view. The notes appear on a scrolling piano roll, and their durations and MIDI note velocities are editable using the mouse.

When first released in 1994, Overture always showed the score in a fully editable WYSIWYG page view, in which all notational elements could be entered or edited. This contrasted with Finale, in which, at the time, the user had to select between a large number of editing modes before performing different types of edits. Later versions of Overture also introduced a scrolling linear view, which enabled editing of both notational elements and playback data. Most previous notation programs either lacked an editable WYSIWYG page view, or switched between a scrolling linear view used for editing; and a page view used for print previews with limited editing functions only, as in Finale at the time.

Screenshot of an early version (3.6) of Overture on the Classic Mac operating system (OS 9), showing palettes (at the left and right of screen), step note entry window (upper center), and track list window (bottom)

As of 2017, Overture supports synchronized film/video playback, and plugins such as Garritan instrument libraries.

In 2018, Sonic Scores announced the release of the Amadeus Symphonic Orchestra sampled instrument library, accessible in Overture using the Kontakt instrument library interface. The Amadeus instrument library contains a large number of sampled instruments, playing with different articulations.

As at June 2021, Overture is in version 5.6.3-3. Updates often include improvements suggested by the user community.

== Publisher ==
Overture has been continuously maintained by the developer since it was first released. It was originally published by Opcode Systems, which produced MIDI sequencing and digital audio software. After Opcode ceased product development in 1999, having been bought out by Gibson Brands, Overture found a new publisher, Cakewalk. Cakewalk published the software from 1999 to 2001. In 2001, Williams' own company, GenieSoft – now known as Sonic Scores – purchased Overture from Cakewalk. Greg Hendershott, CEO of Cakewalk at the time, announced, "The fact that GenieSoft founder Don Williams is the original developer of these products is great news for those customers. He's committed to continuing customer support and product enhancements." GenieSoft later changed its name to Sonic Scores, and has published and developed Overture since 2001.

Sonic Scores also markets Score Writer, a less expensive version of Overture with reduced features. In addition, Sonic Scores is known as the publisher of the Amadeus Symphonic Orchestra sampled instrument library, which is compatible with many scorewriter programs.

Demonstration versions of Overture and Score Writer are available at the Sonic Scores website. The demonstration versions are fully functional for a 30 day trial period, after which, saving and printing are disabled. Site licences are also sold.

== Website, support and user community ==
Support from the developer and the user community is provided via a support forum area on the website. Version release information on each update and beta versions are also available via the forum.

== Reviews ==
Reviewers of Overture have generally highlighted the software's logical user interface and ease of use, although some reviewers have found version 5 less intuitive.

In 1996, Marc Battier reviewed version 1.2 of the program for the Leonardo Music Journal, writing, "...Overture has found its place among the highly regarded common music notation software for the Macintosh." Battier points out that Overture is set apart by its ability to edit MIDI playback data whilst retaining a full set of notational tools, "It is less usual to see notation programs that have substantial MIDI control implementation... Overture has clearly inherited a number of features from its older cousin, the well-known sequencer Vision... One can use the program as a MIDI sequencer while retaining full capability of editing data with a comprehensive music notation set of tools." While Battier felt a weakness was that, at the time, Overture lacked a function to create user-drawn graphics, he points out that these can be imported. He praised the ability to create custom MIDI drum maps, and Overture's tool palettes, which can be put out of the way of the score workspace.

In 1997, Ross Whitney reviewed version 2 of the software in the Music Library Association's journal, Notes. Praising Overture's design, he wrote, "Built on a solid base of experience and insight... the program can hardly be considered immature. Its design is essentially intuitive, efficient and flexible." He adds that "Overture accommodates virtually every standard notational practice of Western music used by educators, professional composers, arrangers and copyists."

In 2012, Chad Criswell, of MusicEdMagic, reviewed Overture version 4, writing, "The Overture music notation system is another in a long line of lesser known but well designed music writing programs... the Overture system provides most of the same functionality and capabilities as Finale or Sibelius but does so in a lighter, somewhat easier to use package."

Criswell observes how changing noteheads, and adding articulations and markings, while cumbersome in some software, is easy in Overture. He writes, "One of the more helpful things I discovered right off the bat in Overture is that they put the options for changing the appearance of music note heads, articulations, and other markings right up front in easy to use pull down menus... Overture makes it very easy."

However, Criswell also notes that Overture version 4 "...is good but not perfect", pointing out that it lacked instrument parts which are dynamically linked to the master score. (Version 5, released in 2016, allows viewing, layout editing and printing of individual parts directly within the master document.)

In 2019, Ana Marculescu, of the Romanian tech-news site, Softpedia, reviewed version 5. Marculescu describes Overture as "an advanced software application designed for helping composers, music educators and students create complex tabulator scores." Marculescu was somewhat overwhelmed by the interface of version 5, "The layout cannot be described as highly intuitive as it may look a bit overwhelming at a first glance." Marculescu sums up, "All in all, Overture includes a comprehensive suite of editing tools and symbols palettes that can be used by professional musicians in order to compose music."

== Score Writer ==
Score Writer is a program also available from Sonic Scores. It has the same scoring interface as Overture, but with a lower price and without graphic MIDI data view and many of the advanced features available in Overture. Score Writer is marketed as a simple package for people new to notation and composition, and easily allows the creation of small to medium ensemble scores of up to 20 tracks/instruments, and lead sheets with guitar frames. In Score Writer, the score page view zooming is limited to small, medium and large sizes in WYSIWYG page layout view only.

Among the more advanced features of Overture which are not included in Score Writer are: cross-staff and feathered beaming; graphic view MIDI editing (although MIDI data can be edited on-score); automatic and customised guitar tablature; video playback and SMPTE time code insertion into the score; compatibility with VST and the Amadeus Symphonic Orchestra instrument library; custom engraver spacing; ability to hide individual staves; and ossia staves.

== Compatibility ==
When first released, Overture ran only on Mac OS computers, with a Windows version being added in a later release. Overture versions from 3 onwards have been released for both Windows and Mac OS. The software is 64-bit native. Overture 5 requires Windows 7 or later, or MacOS 10.9 or later.

As of 2021, the Overture interface operates in English, French, Chinese, Norwegian and Spanish.

Overture is compatible with VST and Kontakt player libraries.

In addition to its own file format, (.ove and .ovex), Overture can read and write the industry standard Music XML (.musicxml and .mxl) files for sharing scores with other music scoring programs. It can read Score Writer (.scwx) files, and can open, play and edit MIDI audio data files (.mid) as scores.

== See also ==
- List of music software
