= Mus2 =

Music notation software

- Mus2 running on Mac OS X
- Developers: Utku Uzmen, M. Kemal Karaosmanoğlu (Published by Data-Soft Ltd.)
- Release: 2010
- Final release: 3.3.1 / 23 September 2025; 13 months ago
- Operating system: Windows, macOS
- Available in: English, Turkish
- Type: Scorewriter
- License: Proprietary
- Website: www.mus2.com.tr

Mus2 (pronounced [musiˈki]) is a music application for the notation of microtonal works and is designed for Turkish maqam music. Mus2 allows the user to work in many tuning systems with customizable accidentals, playing back the score with accurate intonation.

== History ==
Mus2 (from musiki, the Ottoman Turkish word for "music") was originally the name of a music application developed by M. Kemal Karaosmanoğlu for the notation of Turkish music pieces. However, this software was never publicly released as it was not deemed ready for general use.

Turkish software developer Utku Uzmen independently began working on the microtonal notation application Nihavent in September 2009, and released the first beta version in May 2010. Nihavent went through several iterations before being picked up by Data-Soft for distribution, and the application was released on September 15, 2010, under the Mus2 name.

== Features ==
The foremost feature of Mus2 is its ability to re-tune a staff to any tuning system using absolute frequencies, rationals and cents. Additionally, the user can import music symbols from graphics files and fonts for use as accidentals with arbitrary cent values. Turkish music theorist and composer Ozan Yarman has used this capability of Mus2 to devise a notation system, Mandalatura, for a 79-tone kanun that he also designed himself.

Microtonal support isn't limited to symbols; when a score using an alternative tuning system is played back, Mus2 performs the piece with correct intonation using acoustic and electronic instrument sound samples. The program supports uncommon time signatures such as 7/6 and can create tuplets with ratios such as 10:7.

Version 2.0 of the software adds MIDI recording capabilities with a simple sequencer and is able to map the keys of a MIDI instrument to any tuning in tandem with the built-in microtonal sampler. This also opens up the software to use as a microtonal instrument.

The notation tools in the program are presented in a tool strip which only shows the relevant options for the selected tool. When a notation symbol is placed on the score paper, its layout and position is automatically determined, usually with no need for manual adjustment by the user.

Mus2 uses its own file formats for storing scores, tunings and accidentals, which can include metadata for indexing and cataloguing. It is also possible to export the score to a variety of audio and graphics formats.

Mus2 has been developed with the Qt framework and is available for Windows and Mac OS X.

== See also ==
- List of music software
