= MusicXML =

File format

- Filename extension: .musicxml, .mxl
- Internet media type: application/vnd.recordare.musicxml+xml, application/vnd.recordare.musicxml
- Developed by: W3C Music Notation Community Group
- Latest release: 4.0; 1 June 2021
- Type of format: Musical notation
- Extended from: XML
- Open format?: Yes
- Website: www.musicxml.com

MusicXML is an XML-based file format for representing Western musical notation. The format is open, fully documented, and can be freely used under the W3C Community Final Specification Agreement.

== History ==
MusicXML was invented by Michael Good and initially developed by Recordare LLC. It derived several key concepts from existing academic formats (such as Walter Hewlett's ASCII-based MuseData and David Huron's Humdrum). It is designed for the interchange of scores, particularly between different scorewriters. MusicXML development was managed by MakeMusic following the company's acquisition of Recordare in 2011. MusicXML development was transferred to the W3C Music Notation Community Group in July 2015.

Version 1.0 was released in January 2004. Version 1.1 was released in May 2005 with improved formatting support. Version 2.0 was released in June 2007 and included a standard compressed format. All of these versions were defined by a series of document type definitions (DTDs). An XML Schema Definition (XSD) implementation of Version 2.0 was released in September 2008. Version 3.0 was released in August 2011 with improved virtual instrument support, in both DTD and XSD versions. Version 3.1 was released in December 2017 with improved support for the Standard Music Font Layout (SMuFL). Version 4.0 was released in June 2021 and resolved multiple issues.

The MusicXML DTDs and XSDs are each freely redistributable under the W3C Community Final Specification Agreement.

== Support ==
As of September 2024, over 270 notation programs have at least some MusicXML interchange capability. These programs include:

- Most scorewriting programs, including Finale, Dorico, Sibelius, and MuseScore
- Most optical music recognition programs, including SmartScore, PhotoScore and Audiveris
- Most music sequencer programs, including Cubase, Logic Pro, Digital Performer, and SONAR

Additionally, web support is possible through the use of the HTML5 canvas element and JavaScript resulting in the rendering of legible music within a web browser.

Features include key and time signatures, clefs, beaming information, stem directions, slurs, ornaments, barlines, and written repeats, though the support differs between programs.

== Example ==
Like all XML-based formats, MusicXML is intended to be easy for automated tools to parse and manipulate. Though it is possible to create MusicXML by hand, interactive score writing programs like Finale and MuseScore greatly simplify the reading, writing, and modifying of MusicXML files.

Representation of middle C on the treble clef created through MusicXML code.

The following example is a score consisting of a single whole note middle C in the key of C major on the treble clef.

<?xml version="1.0" encoding="UTF-8" standalone="no"?>
<!DOCTYPE score-partwise PUBLIC
    "-//Recordare//DTD MusicXML 4.0 Partwise//EN"
    "http://www.musicxml.org/dtds/partwise.dtd">
<score-partwise version="4.0">
  <part-list>
    <score-part id="P1">
      <part-name>Music</part-name>
    </score-part>
  </part-list>
  <part id="P1">
    <measure number="1">
      <attributes>
        <divisions>1</divisions>
        <key>
          <fifths>0</fifths>
        </key>
        <time>
          <beats>4</beats>
          <beat-type>4</beat-type>
        </time>
        <clef>
          <sign>G</sign>
          <line>2</line>
        </clef>
      </attributes>
      <note>
        <pitch>
          <step>C</step>
          <octave>4</octave>
        </pitch>
        <duration>4</duration>
        <type>whole</type>
      </note>
    </measure>
  </part>
</score-partwise>

The textual representation listed above is verbose; MusicXML v2.0 addresses this by adding a compressed zip format with a .mxl suffix that can make files roughly one-twentieth the size of the uncompressed version.

== See also ==
- List of document markup languages
- Comparison of document markup languages
- MIDI
- Music Encoding Initiative (MEI)
- Music Markup Language
- Notation Interchange File Format (NIFF)
- Scorewriter
- Musescore
