= List of music software =

This is a list of software for creating, performing, learning, analyzing, researching, broadcasting and editing music. This article only includes software, not services.

For streaming services such as iHeartRadio, Pandora, Prime Music, and Spotify, see Comparison of on-demand streaming music services.

For storing, uploading, downloading, and streaming music via the cloud, see Comparison of online music lockers.

This list does not include discontinued historic or legacy software, with the exception of trackers that are still supported.

If a program fits several categories, such as a comprehensive digital audio workstation or a foundation programming language (e.g. Pure Data), its listing is limited to its top three categories.

== Types ==
=== CD ripping software ===
- Brasero
- CDex
- Exact Audio Copy
- fre:ac
- k3b

=== Choir and learn-to-sing software ===
This section includes both choir software and learn-to-sing software. For music learning software, see music education software.

- Cantor (music software)
- SingingCoach

=== DJ software ===
- Cross/CrossDJ
- Deckadance
- djay
- Final Scratch
- Mixxx
- Serato
- Traktor
- Rekordbox
- VirtualDJ

=== Digital audio workstation (DAW) software ===
- Ableton Live
- ACID Pro
- Ardour
- Audacity
- AudioDesk
- Audiotool
- BandLab
- BespokeSynth
- Bitwig Studio
- Cakewalk Sonar
- Cubase
- Cubasic
- Digital Performer
- FL Studio
- GarageBand
- HighC
- Jam Session
- LMMS
- Logic Pro
- LUNA (Universal Audio)
- Magix Music Maker
- Maschine
- MetaSynth
- Mixcraft
- MultitrackStudio
- MusE
- n-Track Studio
- Nuendo
- Mixbus
- MuLab
- Orion Studio
- Pro Tools
- Pyramix
- Qtractor
- REAPER
- Reason
- Renoise
- Rosegarden
- Samplitude
- Sonic Pi
- Soundtrap
- Studio One
- Waveform

=== Computer music software ===
- ChucK
- Csound
- Director Musices
- Generative music software
- JFugue
- Kyma (sound design language)
- Keykit
- Max/MSP
- Opusmodus
- Pure Data
- Suno AI
- SuperCollider
- Udio

=== Internet, RSS, broadcast music software ===
This section only includes software, not services. For services such as Spotify, Pandora, and Prime Music, see Comparison of on-demand streaming music services. This list includes music RSS apps, widgets, and software; for a list of feeds, see Comparison of feed aggregators. For cloud-based music broadcast software, see Content delivery network and Comparison of online music lockers.

- Airtime
- Audicom (first radio automation software; see Radio software)
- Campcaster
- Clickradio
- Juice (aggregator)
- Jamulus (Internet jamming software)
- Moodagent (AI-based emotion-keyed playlist generator and app)
- Ninjam (Internet jamming software)
- OpenBroadcaster
- Panopto

=== Lyrics and vocals ===
- Cantor (music software)
- Rhyme Genie (Algorithms and software for rhyming lyrics)
- SingingCoach

=== Audio plug-ins ===
- Blackhole, H3000 Factory, SplitEQ (Eventide, Inc.)
- Stutter Edit, Ozone, RX Audio Editor (iZotope)
- Jamstix (Rayzoon Technologies)
- Liquid Rhythm (WaveDNA)
- PCM Native, MPX Native (Lexicon (company))
- NI Massive, Kontakt (software), B4, Electrik Piano, Guitar Rig 2 (Native Instruments)
- OrangeVocoder (Prosoniq)
- SoundFont (Integrates synthesized/sampled MIDI files with recorded music)
- MachFive, Symphonic Instrument (Mark of the Unicorn)

=== Music analysis software ===
- BeatRoot
- ChucK
- Kyma (sound design language)
- Opusmodus
- Pure Data
- Platinum Blue Music Intelligence (from Music Xray company)
- Sonic Visualiser
- WaveSurfer

=== Music circuit software ===
- Arduinome (software circuit platform)
- CPU Sim
- Electric VLSI Design System
- gLogic
- GNU Circuit Analysis Package
- KTechLab
- Linear Technology (A/D and circuit software)
- List of free electronics circuit simulators
- LTspice
- Micro-Cap
- MIDIbox (software circuit platform)
- Monome (software circuit platform)
- Ngspice
- Oregano (software)
- Quite Universal Circuit Simulator
- SapWin
- SPICE
- Tenori-on (software circuit platform)

=== Music composing software ===
- Antescofo
- Director Musices
- Hyperscore
- JFugue
- Keykit
- Kyma (sound design language)
- Max
- Music Mouse (Algorithmic synth and composer)
- Nodal
- Ocarina
- OpenMusic
- Opusmodus
- PetSynth
- Reaktor
- Rubato Composer

=== Music conversion software ===
- AIMP
- Audacity
- Brasero
- CDex
- Exact Audio Copy
- FFmpeg
- FL Studio
- foobar2000
- Freemake Audio Converter
- Free Studio
- fre:ac
- iTunes
- k3b
- MediaCoder
- MediaHuman Audio Converter
- MediaMonkey
- SoX
- VLC Media Player
- Winamp
- WMA Convert

=== Music education software ===
- Soundtrap
- Meludia
- EarMaster
- EarSketch
- GNU Solfege
- Hyperscore
- Reaktor
- Rocksmith
- Synthesia
- WaveSurfer
- Yousician
- GibsonApp
- Chordify

=== Music gaming software ===
- Beat Saber
- Crypt of the NecroDancer
- osu!
- Music Tech
- Rocksmith

=== Music mathematics software ===
- JFugue
- Julia (programming language)
- Scala
- Wolfram Language

=== Music notation software ===
- Aegis Sonix
- Canorus
- Capella
- Deluxe Music Construction Set
- Denemo
- Dorico
- Encore
- ENT (for typeset mensural notation)
- Finale
- Flat
- Forte
- Frescobaldi
- Gregorio (for Neumes)
- Guitar Pro
- Igor Engraver
- Impro-Visor
- jEdit plugin
- LilyPond
- MagicScore
- Mozart
- Mus2
- MusEdit
- MuseScore
- Music Write
- MusiCAD
- MusicEase
- MusiXTeX
- NoteEdit
- Noteflight
- Notation Composer
- NoteWorthy Composer
- NOTION
- Overture
- Philip's Music Writer (PMW)
- Power Tab Editor
- Rosegarden
- SCORE
- ScoreCloud
- Sibelius (Division of Avid Technology since 8/2006. Avid also sells the Pro Tools DAW)
- SmartScore (Focus on Music OCR)
- TuxGuitar

=== Music research software ===
- ScoreCloud (Notation research)

=== Music technology, synthesis and OS software ===
- Category:Music software plugin architectures
- Comparison of audio synthesis environments
- DirectMusic
- Moodagent (AI-based emotion-keyed playlist generator and app)
- Music information retrieval
- Software effect processor
- Sound Recorder (Windows)
- Impromptu (programming environment)
- Keykit
- Max (software)
- SynthFont (a MIDI-to-WAV converter; Virtual Studio Technology instruments can be used instead of source files)

=== Music visualization software ===
- Advanced Visualization Studio (Justin Frankel) (platform: Windows)
- Cthugha (1993, Kevin "Zaph" Burfitt) (platform: DOS)
- Magic Music Visuals (since 2012, Color & Music, LLC) (platforms: Windows, OS X)
- MilkDrop (2001-2012, Ryan Geiss) reimplemented as projectM (platforms: Windows, Linux, Android)
- Neon (2004, Jeff Minter and Ivan Zorzin) (platform: Xbox 360)
- Psychedelia
- Pure Data
- Virtual Light Machine (1990, Jeff Minter) (platform: Atari Jaguar)
- Visual Music Tone Painter (1992–2004)

=== Orchestration software ===
- Antescofo
- IRCAM
- OpenMusic
- Orchidée
- NotePerformer

==== Drums and percussion ====
- Liquid Rhythm
- Radiodrum

==== Guitar ====
- Guitar Rig
- Line 6
- Rocksmith
- Guitar Pro
- TuxGuitar
- GarageBand
- Logic Pro
- Ableton Live
- Audacity

==== Piano ====
- Kurzweil Digital Piano
- Pianoteq (Modartt)
- SGX-1 Premium Piano
- Synthesia
- Virtual piano

==== Pipe organ ====
- Hauptwerk produces audio in response to MIDI signal from attached keyboard or from a MIDI sequencer

=== Automatic composition software ===
- Experiments in Musical Intelligence

=== Samplers and sequencers ===
- Electribe
- Music sequencer
- Propellerhead
- SoundFont

=== Soundtrack creation software ===
- Anvil Studio
- Ensoniq PARIS
- FL Studio
- FL Studio Mobile
- Mixcraft
- Pro Tools
- Sound Forge
- Soundtrap
- SpectraLayers
- WaveLab

=== Trackers ===
Historical tracker software:

- SoundMonitor (C64, 1986)
- Ultimate Soundtracker (Amiga, 1987)
- NoiseTracker (Amiga, 1989)
- OctaMED (Amiga, 1989)
- Protracker (Amiga, 1990)
- ScreamTracker (PC, 1994)
- FastTracker 2 (PC, 1994)
- Impulse Tracker (PC, 1995)

Name	Latest update	License	OS versions			File format support					VST support	ASIO output
Name	Latest update	License	Windows	OS X	Linux	MID	MOD	XM	IT	S3M	VST support	ASIO output
Renoise	7 May 2024	Proprietary	Yes	Yes	Yes	Read only	Read only	Read only	Read only	No	Yes	Yes
OpenMPT	29 June 2025	BSD	Yes	Yes (via Wine)	Yes (via Wine)	Yes	Yes	Yes	Yes	Yes	Yes	Yes
SoundTracker	17 March 2024	GPL	No	No	Yes	No	Yes	Yes	No	No	No	No
MilkyTracker	25 November 2024	GPL	Yes	Yes	Yes	No	Yes	Yes	Read only	Read only	No	Yes
Buzztrax	6 January 2016	LGPL	Yes	Yes	Yes	Read only	Read only	Read only	Read only	No	Yes	Yes

=== Virtual Studio Technology hosting software ===
- Ableton Live
- ACID Pro
- Adobe Audition
- Adobe Premiere Elements
- Adobe Premiere Pro
- Acoustica Mixcraft
- Ardour (open source)
- Audacity (open source, Windows, Linux, and Mac platforms only)
- AudioMulch
- Band-in-a-Box
- Cakewalk by BandLab
- Deckadance
- Digital Performer (version 8 or higher)
- FL Studio
- GoldWave
- Jeskola Buzz
- LMMS (open source)
- Logic Pro
- Magix Music Maker
- Max MSP
- ModPlug Tracker
- MultitrackStudio
- n-Track Studio
- NOTION
- Pure Data (via an extension)
- REAPER
- Reason
- Renoise
- Samplitude
- Sony Acid Pro
- Sony Sound Forge
- Sony Vegas
- Soundtrap
- Steinberg Cubase
- Steinberg Nuendo
- Studio One
- Steinberg WaveLab
- Traktor
- Vocaloid
- WavePad Audio Editor

=== Virtual synthesizer and studio software ===
- Amsynth
- Minimoog
- Reaktor (instrument-creation software)
- Reason (DAW and virtual recording studio, integrated with Record)
- Spire
- VCV Rack
- ZynAddSubFX

=== Wave editors ===
- Acoustica
- Audition
- Audacity
- GoldWave
- Sound Forge
- SoX
- SpectraLayers
- Total Recorder
- WaveLab
- WavePad Audio Editor
- WaveSurfer

== See also ==
- Audio editing software
- Comparison of audio synthesis environments
- Comparison of digital audio editors
- Comparison of free software for audio
- Comparison of MIDI editors and sequencers
- Comparison of scorewriters
- List of audio conversion software
- List of audio programming languages
- List of Linux audio software
- List of scorewriters
- Music technology
