= Composer (disambiguation) =

A composer is someone, or something that composes a cohesive result by putting together two or more things, elements, or parts to form a whole. A composer typically refers to a person who creates or writes music.

== Music ==
- Composer (album), a 1996 album by Cedar Walton
- "The Composer", a 1969 song by Diana Ross & the Supremes from the album Let the Sunshine In
- Rubato Composer, software that composes music

== Computing ==
- Composer (software), a dependency manager for the PHP programming language
- Mozilla Composer, a component of the Mozilla Web browser
- Netscape Composer, a WYSIWYG HTML editor

== Other uses ==
- Composer (role variant)
- Chess composer

== See also ==
- Compose key
- Compositor (disambiguation)
