= Protofuse =

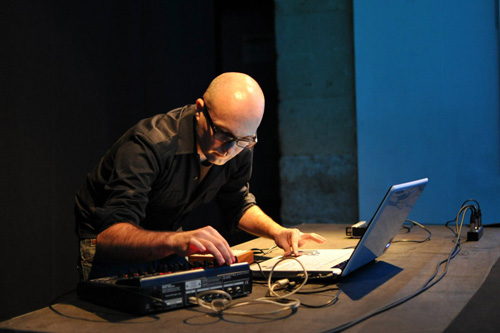
- Protofuse making a music live performance

Background information
- Born: Julien Bayle; 22 February 1976 (age 50); France
- Genres: IDM, Ambient music, Noise music, Musique concrète
- Instruments: Ableton Live, Max MSP, Hardware Synthesizers & Sequencers
- Years active: 2008-present
- Labels: ELLI Records, Vøid Label, Bordille Records, EterLab
- Website: julienbayle.net

Julien Bayle (born February 1976 in France) is a French electronic musician and music software trainer.

== Biography ==
Bayle was born in the South of France. He studied Biology and Computer Sciences in Marseille. During his studies, he explored minimal techno, influenced especially by Carl Craig and Surgeon.

His work explores software including Cubase 1.0 and Generator (the precursor to Reaktor). His first live solo shows took place in early 2003. He designed and built the protodeck midi controller, (based on the open-source hardware framework MIDIbox) in 2008.

He founded and leads his own studio, Julien Bayle Studio. He provides Ableton Live Suite, Max for Live, and Max/MSP advanced training courses, and also leads workshops in Europe in art and design schools. He is an Ableton Certified Trainer.

== Musical approach ==
Bayle is often described as a minimalist experimental musician when he plays his ambient music performance or when he plays more syncopated IDM. His influences include Autechre and Aphex Twin, and for his ambient music by Brian Eno and Pete Namlook.

== Selected discography ==
=== EP ===
- Part EP, 2010
- Bits#0, 2011
- Bits#1, 2011
