= Soundtracker =

Soundtracker may refer to:

- Ultimate Soundtracker: a music tracker program for the Commodore Amiga
- SoundTracker (Unix): a music tracker program for Unix-like operating systems
- Soundtracker (ZX Spectrum): a music tracker program for the ZX Spectrum
- Soundtracker (music streaming): a music streaming platform for mobile devices
