= Score following =

Score following is the process of automatically listening to a live music performance and tracking the position in the score. It is an active area of research and stands at the intersection of artificial intelligence, pattern recognition, signal processing, and musicology. Score following was first introduced in 1984 independently by Barry Vercoe and Roger Dannenberg.

Artistically, it is one of the main components for live electronic music of many composers such as Pierre Boulez and Philippe Manoury among others and is currently an active line of research in different communities such as IRCAM in Paris. The latest version of IRCAM's score following, developed by the Musical Representations Team is capable of following complex audio signals (monophonic and polyphonic) and synchronize events via the detected tempo of the performance in realtime. It's distributed publicly since 2009 under the name Antescofo and has been successfully performed throughout the world for a wide number of contemporary music productions including realtime electronics.

Other score following authors include Chris Raphael, Roger Dannenberg, Barry Vercoe, Miller Puckette, Nicola Orio, Arshia Cont, and Frank Weinstock (U.S. patent 5,952,597; U.S. patent 6,107,559; U.S. patent 6,166,314).

For the first time, in October 2006, there is going to be a Score Following evaluation during the second Music Information Retrieval Evaluation eXchange (MIREX). It is expected that most systems participate and compete in live musical situations and the results be announced in public domain.

== See also ==
- List of music software
