= Arduinome =

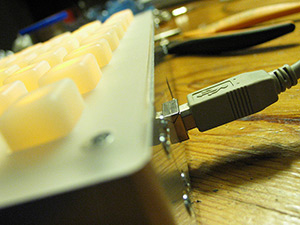
Arduinome

An Arduinome is a MIDI controller device that mimics the Monome using the Arduino physical computing platform. The plans for the Arduinome are released under an open source, non-commercial use only license. The Arduinome platform is noted for providing a lower cost alternative to the Monome and allows greater hackability of the interface.

The arduinome was described by Jordan Hochenbaum as "testament to the uniqueness of arduino itself".

== See also ==
- List of music software
