= VDJ =

VDJ may refer to:

- VirtualDJ, an audio and video mixing software, developed by Atomix Productions
- VJ (media personality), a television announcer who introduces and plays videos
- V(D)J recombination, a mechanism of genetic recombination
