= SingingCoach =

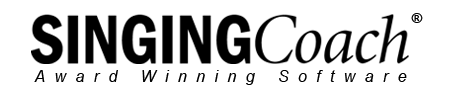
- Genre: Singing
- Founded: 2003
- Founders: Carlo Franzblau & Alix Franzblau
- Key people: Carlo Franzblau (founder & CEO), Alix Franzblau (shareholder and co-founder)
- Products: Pitch Recognition Software
- Parent: Electronic Learning Products (ELP)
- Website: www.singingcoach.com

SingingCoach is a downloadable, learn-to-sing software program from Electronic Learning Products, Inc.

== Development and early years ==
Brother and sister Carlo and Alix Franzblau of Tampa, Florida, founded Electronic Learning Products, Inc. in January 2000. In 2003, their first product, a learn-to-sing program was released with the name of Carry-a-Tune. The name was changed to SingingCoach in 2004.

== Versions and releases ==
The original software disk version of Carry-a-Tune was released in 2003. In 2004, the trademark "Carry-a-Tune" was replaced with "SingingCoach" in an effort to clarify the software's specific function as the software was gaining publicity and notoriety by various publications such as PC magazine. SingingCoach was sold in software brick and mortar giants, Best Buy, Comp USA, and Target. In 2012, Franzblau opened his software up to exclusively e-commerce shoppers by offering a downloadable version of SingingCoach, allowing customers to download the program directly from the website as opposed to picking up the software in a brick and mortar store.

== Pitch recognition technology ==
SingingCoach utilizes a pitch recognition technology that was developed by Carlo Franzblau and engineered by his team of programmers. Its technology uses a white tracking line on screen to record and display the pitch of one's voice in reference to the "in tune" bars of the song. This allows the user to understand whether or not they are singing in tune, and to adjust their voice accordingly. A score is given after completion of a song based on the percentage of time the singer was in tune.

== Development of Tunein to Reading ==
In 2006, Franzblau realized that struggling readers who used SINGINGCoach also became more effective readers – an unintended response derived from using the software. Franzblau approached literacy researchers from the University of South Florida in Tampa who performed research studies over a period of five years that documented the benefits of the singing approach on all reader levels. In 2011, white papers were published describing the mechanism that made the singing approach so effective. Researchers dubbed the instructional method "melodic learning" or the combination of music with visual imagery in the learning process. Melodic learning is the simultaneous use of traditional multi-sensory/multi-modality learning in which the auditory and kinesthetic modes embody significant rhythmic and tonal elements.

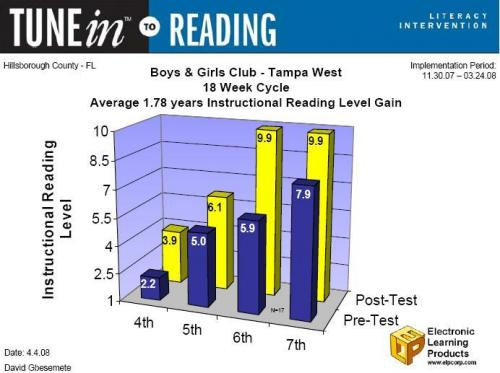
A graph of the reading gains of students using TuneIn to Reading from ELP

== Patents ==
In September 2007, Franzblau's patent # 7,271,329 covering a "computer-aided learning system that employs a pitch tracking line" was issued. Other patents protecting surrounding inventions are currently pending.

== See also ==
- University of South Florida
- List of music software
