= Music Write =

Scorewriter

Music Write is a Windows-based music notation program created by Voyetra Music Software. It uses a MIDI-based system for storing events, and the most recent versions save music in MWK files, similar to Standard MIDI Files with additional text and symbol events. Currently, Voyetra offers three editions of Music Write: Starter Kit, Songwriter edition, and Maestro edition. All support printing, MIDI recording, and MIDI playback granted the user has the appropriate hardware.

== Music Write Starter Kit ==
The Starter Kit is targeted for students and beginners. It supports note values up to sixteenth notes. It also supports a maximum of two staves with two voices on each.

== Music Write Songwriter edition ==
The Songwriter edition supports note values down to sixteenth notes. It supports a maximum of eight tracks, and each may have up to two staves (such as a piano grand staff on one track). In addition, the Songwriter edition allows the user to create drum notation, and customize chords and fonts. In an older version of Music Write, entitled Music Write 2000, this edition was called the Standard Edition.

== Music Write Maestro edition ==
The Maestro edition is the top-of-the-line for Music Write. has the same features as the Songwriter edition, but in addition to a notation editor, has a piano roll note editor (similar to piano rolls in player pianos); a control editor; a song editor; a software mixer; an event list; and comments box. 47 tracks per file are supported, and each track may have up to two staves as well. Unlike the Starter Kit and Songwriter edition, the Maestro edition supports note values up to 64th-notes and can export notation to a BMP or TIFF picture file. Previously, the Maestro Edition was entitled the Professional Edition.

== Discontinued Products ==
Before rebranding into the three editions described above, Voyetra released the original "Music Write" and "Music Write Plus" software for Windows 95/98. These were similar to, and later released as, the Starter Kit edition. Unlike their modern counterparts which share a common "MWK" proprietary format for saving data, the original MW/MWP saved in a different and now obsolete PBL format (.pbl extension). MWP was able to save MIDI as well, but Music Write did not have this feature.

As these programs are not compatible with Windows 2000 or later, and the current editions do not support PBL, users may find they are unable to open legacy scores created with MW / MWP. A third party online converter exists , but is not formally recognized by Voyetra and is somewhat incomplete.

== See also ==
- List of music software
