= SynthFont =

SynthFont is a commercial MIDI editor and "MIDI to Waveform" converter, developed by European software developer Kenneth Rundt.

== Description ==
SynthFont is a program for editing and playing MIDI files using various sound source files like soundfonts, GigaSampler files, SFZ files and more. VST (Virtual Studio Technology) instruments can also be used instead of a sound source file. A MIDI file is a collection of notes and instructions for how to play them. SynthFont combines this data with the audio data in a SoundFont to produce ("render") an audio version of the musical piece.

The current version of this utility is 2.0.2.2, released on July 17, 2015. SynthFont is freely available as trialware, and requires a licence in order to use it after thirty days. Any SoundFont 1 licence will work on SoundFont2. Each licence will cost €15, translating to £10.90, or $16.77. Version 1.730, however, is currently available for free.

== See also ==
- List of music software
