= Moodagent =

- Company type: Private
- Headquarters: Copenhagen, Denmark
- Area served: Worldwide
- Founders: Peter Berg Steffensen; Mikael A. Henderson
- Key people: Steen Kristiansen/CEO; Nick Jensen/Chairman; Peter Berg Steffensen/CIO; Mikael A. Henderson/CCO
- Industry: Music Streaming
- Products: White label music streaming service, music recommendations, playlists, search, discovery and analytics
- Employees: +40
- Parent: Moodagent A/S
- Website: www.moodagent.com
- Launched: September 2001
- Current status: Active

Moodagent is a white label music streaming service that specializes in interactive playlists and personalized music recommendations. The Moodagent brand is developed and owned by the Danish company Moodagent A/S, which has proprietary methods for recognizing emotional and musical characteristics of individual tracks.

The patented technology behind Moodagent combines digital signal processing, machine learning, AI techniques, audio analysis and human musicology. Using this technology, Moodagent analyzes key characteristics in songs such as mood, emotion, genre, style, instrumentation, vocal, orchestration, production, and beat/tempo.

== History ==
=== Early development ===
Entrepreneurs and music enthusiasts Peter Berg Steffensen & Mikael A. Henderson founded Moodagent (then under the company name Syntonetic Media Solutions) in 2001 to create an intelligent system that reads the inherent musical and emotional characteristics of each individual track, and to string them together in playlists that matches the style, tempo and current mood of the listener.

An international patent was granted for an automated sequential logic mechanism in 2004, which would form the basis of the Moodagent playlisting technology developed in the following years.

=== First app release ===
The earliest incarnation of the Moodagent music mobile app was named Playlist DJ, developed specifically for Nokia phones and unveiled at Nokia World 2009.

With the release of a version for Apple's iOS in December 2009, the app was completely redesigned and renamed Moodagent.

New versions of Moodagent soon followed for other platforms: Android, (July 2010), Symbian (January 2011), Winamp (January 2011), Intel AppUp (April 2011), BlackBerry (May 2011), WebOS (the first version of Moodagent designed strictly for tablets, July 2011), Spotify (November 2011), Windows Phone (January 2012), Nokia Asha (February 2014).

When Moodagent announced the discontinuation of all of their B2C offerings in December 2014, the Moodagent apps had been installed on more than 15 million mobile devices in 175 countries.

The Moodagent music recommendation service preloaded with Winamp was downloaded more than 80 million times.

=== Premium music streaming service ===
An official company press release was published in August 2019, announcing that the company was releasing a full premium music streaming service on September 19, 2019.

== Geographic Availability ==
The Moodagent music streaming service was launched in Denmark in September 2019 with a premium only tier and subsequently launched in Germany in December 2020, in Australia May 2021 India June 2021 and New Zealand July 2021. However, in April 2022 it pressed pause on B2C operations and closed its overseas offices.

== Platforms ==
The Moodagent white label music streaming service is available as an app customized for partners on iOS smartphones and iPods and Android smartphones. A desktop version of the service is also available.

== Features ==
Within Moodagent’s app, users can create and share playlists and moodagents, the company’s namesake feature. Moodagents serve as an in-app music curator that generates interactive playlists. Moodagents can be created and initiated by using any of the app’s “mood sliders” which include Joy, Anger, Sensuality, Tenderness and Tempo. The sliders can be adjusted at any time, pulling in new music with every adjustment.

== Business Model ==
The Moodagent music streaming platform is offered as a white label solution to commercial partners.

== Clients and Partnerships ==
From 2009 to 2014 Moodagent provided consumer faced products, including mobile apps for music playlists & recommendations (iOS, Android, Nokia Symbian^3 & S40, Blackberry, WebOS, Windows Phone).

Moodagent was also included as an online music recommendation service in Winamp and among the first apps chosen for inclusion on Spotify's app platform.

In 2014, Moodagent began focusing on delivering music data services on a B2B basis. Products included music metadata, tools for music recommendations, auto-generation of playlists & audio similarity search for clients including Sony Music, Universal Music Publishing Group, Mood Media, 7digital & TouchTunes.

Several other partnerships were announced, including deliveries for Mood Media's Mood Mix service and The Electric Jukebox Company.

In September 2016 Moodagent announced a joint partnership with Unruly, Affectiva and Kent State University to bring end-to-end emotional intelligence to digital advertising.

Since 2017 Moodagent has been delivering AI based sentiment analysis results for pre-testing audio in adverts to the market research company Kantar and for various brands at Unilever.

A partnership with the Danish Music Awards (DMA) was announced in September 2019.

== See also ==
- List of music software
