= Electric Jukebox =

Digital media player

- Developer: The Electric Jukebox Company
- Type: Digital media player
- Discontinued: August 2017
- Sound: up to 320 kbps streaming
- Connectivity: Wi-Fi; HDMI; 3.5 mm audio jack
- Power: Mains power (HDMI Dongle) Micro-USB (Controller)
- Website: www.electricjukebox.com

Electric Jukebox was a digital media player developed by The Electric Jukebox Company. Designed as a dongle, and a "Nintendo Wii style" motion-sensitive controller with a built-in microphone for voice search, The device played music audio content on a high-definition television and home audio system by directly streaming it via Wi-Fi from the Internet.

Electric Jukebox combined hardware, software, and premium music streaming access into one package; Ars Technica described it as "a box with everything you need to get started in streaming music".

== Hardware ==
=== Electric Jukebox stick ===
The Electric Jukebox dongle had a HDMI plug built into the device's body. The dongle was powered by mains power through an integrated power cable. Electric Jukebox ran on a Rockchip processor. The dongle contained a 3.5mm audio jack as a line out to HiFi’s and speaker systems.

=== Electric Jukebox controller ===
Electric Jukebox Controller was a motion-sensitive remote control with built-in gyroscope and accelerometer to position itself in space in relation to the cursor on the TV screen. The controller also had a microphone for voice search. The controller used HDMI-CEC protocols to switch between other devices on the television without needing to use the television set's remote to change to or from Electric Jukebox.

== Software ==
Electric Jukebox ran on a heavily modified version of the Android operating system. The front-end user interface was built in HTML5 enabling OTA updates which negate users from having to perform software upgrades or app downloads normally required when using music streaming services on computers, smartphones and televisions.

== User interface ==
Electric Jukebox's user interface incorporated neon iconography and music songs and albums represented as spinning disks – a digital manifestation of a physical music product; a CD. The user interface was met with mixed reactions from commentators; several technology-focused media outlets have said the user interface is overly simple compared to other services while mainstream consumer media view the simplicity of Electric Jukebox as opening up music streaming to audiences who are alienated by the complexities of music streaming. CNET commented "Here's an easy way to think about Electric Jukebox: Remember when the Nintendo Wii came out, and suddenly the whole family, who didn't know their Atari from their elbow, was jumping around the living room playing video games? Spotify is the PlayStation, Sonos is the Xbox – and Electric Jukebox is the Wii."

== Features ==
=== Voice search ===
The Electric Jukebox controller's built-in microphone provided access to the full catalogue of music. Voice-activated functionality was provided by Nuance.

=== Celebrity playlists ===
Electric Jukebox featured exclusive playlists from a range of celebrities, including; Robbie Williams and his wife Ayda Field, Sheryl Crow, Alesha Dixon and Stephen Fry.

=== Curated music channels ===
7 Digital provided a range of curated music channels for Electric Jukebox.

=== Music recommendations ===
Danish music tech company Moodagent provided music discovery and recommendations features for Electric Jukebox.

=== Playlist creation ===
Electric Jukebox users could create their own playlists using the Electric Jukebox Controller.

=== Music catalogue ===
Electric Jukebox had a music library of "over 29 million songs" from all major and independent record labels and publishers including Universal Music Group, Sony Music Entertainment, Warner Music Group, Merlin, PIAS, Believe Digital and INgrooves.

== Geographic availability ==
Electric Jukebox was available in:

- United Kingdom

== See also ==
- Comparison of on-demand streaming music services
- List of online music databases
- List of Internet radio stations
- Apple Music
- Spotify
- Deezer
- Tidal
- Rhapsody
- Napster
- Pandora Radio
- IHeartRadio
- SoundCloud
- Amazon Fire TV
- Chromecast
- Roku
- Sonos
- Pure
- Roberts Radio
