= Antescofo =

Antescofo is a program developed by Arshia Cont in 2007 at IRCAM in collaboration with composer Marco Stroppa to aid with the synchronization of electronics in live performances. It is a modular polyphonic Score Following system as well as a Synchronous Programming language for musical composition. Since 2012, Antescofo is being developed by a joint team between IRCAM and INRIA.

A common problem in electroacoustic is the displacement in time between the performer and the fixed electronic sound. Even if the trigger is synchronized at the beginning, there may still be a temporal discrepancy between both after a certain duration due to the natural inflection of time on the part of the human performer. Antescofo is able to recognize adjustment in tempo in real time through audio stream from live performers and detect its position in an input score, thus allowing synchronization. It is designed for use with Max/MSP and PureData programming. Some features also exist in NoteAbility Pro, a notation program developed by Keith Hamel, to export information specifically for Antescofo.

Antescofo is equipped with a dedicated real-time synchronous language as an aid to compose mixed pieces as association of live performers and computers. The language's aim to is to reconcile different notions of time in authoring and performing for musicians and composers.

Besides its use in live electronic music, Antescofo is frequently used in automatic accompaniment applications including on voice.

== Awards and recognition ==
Antescofo has been featured in performances worldwide such as with New York Philharmonic, Berlin Philharmonic, Los Angeles Philharmonic, BBC Scottish Orchestra, West-Eastern Divan Orchestra and more. It has been used by composers such as Marco Stroppa, Philippe Manoury, Jonathan Harvey, Pierre Boulez, and Larry Nelson.

Antescofo was awarded the popular French magazine La Recherche jury prize in 2012. In 2013, Antescofo received the French Industry award by the French Minister of Industry at the time Arnaud Montebourg.

== See also ==
- List of music software
