= MediaHuman Audio Converter =

Freeware audio conversion utility

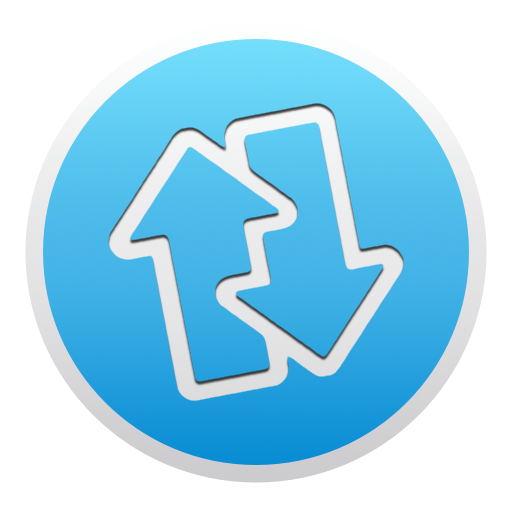

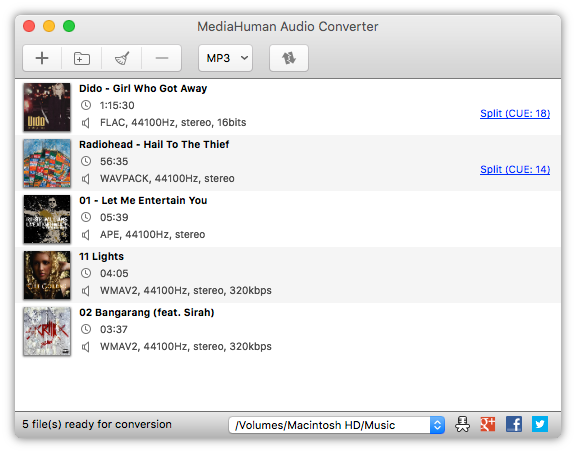
- MediaHuman Audio Converter running under macOS
- Developer: MediaHuman Ltd.
- Release: 30 July 2011
- Stable release: 2.4.1 / 7 November 2026; 1 day ago
- Written in: C/C++ and Qt framework
- Operating system: Microsoft Windows, macOS, Linux
- Platform: IA-32, x86-64, ARM64
- Size: 34.08 MB
- Available in: English, German, French, Spanish, Greek, Russian, Japanese, Italian, Swedish, Dutch, Polish, Portuguese
- License: Freeware
- Website: www.mediahuman.com/audio-converter/

MediaHuman Audio Converter is a freeware audio conversion utility developed by MediaHuman Ltd. The program is used to convert across different audio formats, split lossless audio files using CUE and extract audio from video files. The app can be run on Mac starting from OS X 10.6 and on Windows XP and higher. This software does not support CD burning and CD ripping.

== Features ==
MediaHuman Audio Converter is able to accept many popular audio file formats, such as MP3, WMA, FLAC and WAV. The software is also capable of importing files to iTunes (Music app on macOS Catalina and above). MediaHuman Audio Converter is designed to use multiple CPU cores when converting files in ‘batch mode’. Its user interface supports drag-and-drop functionality.

== License ==
MediaHuman Audio Converter can be downloaded and used free of charge for commercial and non-commercial use.

== Development ==
MediaHuman Audio Converter was originally developed in the programming language C++ with Qt framework using such libraries as FFmpeg, OpenSSL, LAME, and TagLib. The user interface of MediaHuman Audio Converter is based on Qt Widgets.

== See also ==
- High-Efficiency Advanced Audio Coding
- Comparison of audio formats
- List of free software for audio
- List of music software
