= BeatRoot =

BeatRoot is an audio beat tracking and modelling application. In 2006, it won the MIREX prize.

The application is written in Linux/C++, with a Java-based user interface. The code is open source.

BeatRoot accepts file input in either digital audio or MIDI format. uses two simultaneous processes to model the rhythm of a piece of music, one to establish the tempo of the piece and one to synchronise a beat to the music. Since these two processes may at times be at odds, a system of multiple agents model their respective results and arrive at an optimum solution for the music being studied.

== See also ==
- List of music software
