= ScoreCloud =

Music notation software

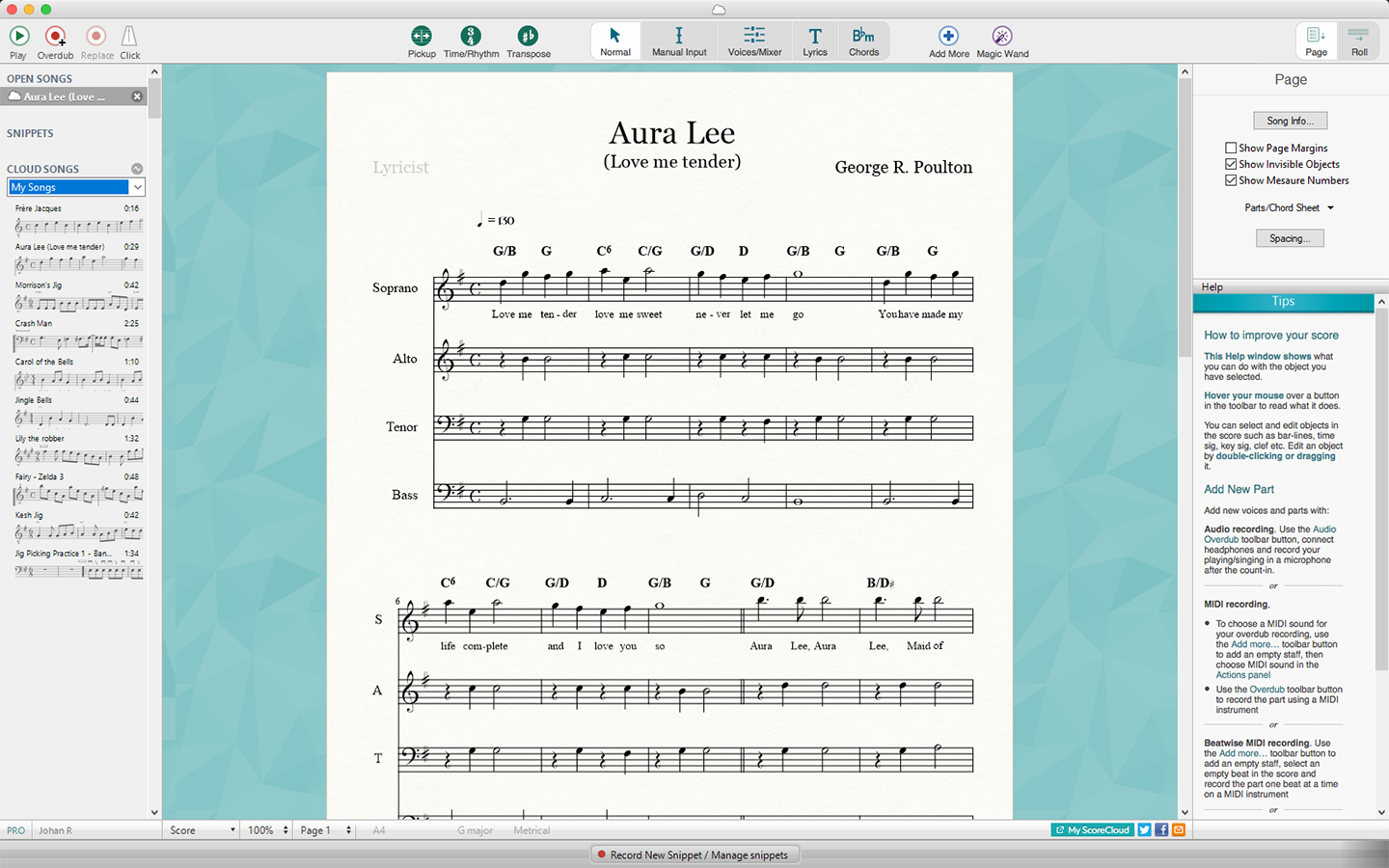
- ScoreCloud Studio 4.0.2 running on OS X
- Developer: Doremir
- Stable release: 4.10.2 / April 2026; 0 months ago
- Platform: macOS, Microsoft Windows, iPhone, iPad
- Type: Music notation software
- License: Proprietary
- Website: scorecloud.com

ScoreCloud is a software service and web application for creating, storing, and sharing music notation, created by Doremir for macOS, Microsoft Windows, iPhone and iPad.

The main functionality of the software is the automatic creation of music notation directly from music performance or recordings.

ScoreCloud comes in two varieties – ScoreCloud Studio and ScoreCloud Express. Studio is an application software available for macOS and Microsoft Windows and contains full editing capabilities, as provided by common music notation software. Express is a mobile app available for iPhone and iPad and contains simplified editing capabilities.

The software is available for free, but adds a watermark when printing, and does not allow saving files or exporting to MusicXML without subscribing at the Pro level. An intermediate subscription plan, Plus, removes the watermark and allows export to MIDI.

ScoreCloud is marketed as the only service offering the ability to record audio, transcribe it to MIDI, transform it to sheet music, and share the sheet music online. ScoreCloud's ability to transcribe real-time MIDI input into sheet music has been praised in the British music technology magazine Sound on Sound.

The latest version, ScoreCloud 4, includes polyphonic audio analysis. In practice, this allows the user to sing or play any instrument whereafter the software will create sheet music.

== Company ==
Doremir Music Research AB is a Musical Intelligence Company based in Stockholm, Sweden. The company's name is derived from the syllables "do, re, mi" in solmization (solfège) and the abbreviation of Music Information Retrieval (MIR) – a computer science field whose objective is to automatically extract information out of audio music signals.

The company was founded by Sven Ahlbäck, Professor at Royal College of Music in Stockholm and Sven Emtell. Its self-declared mission is to "make music creation and communication easier through advanced technology based on music intelligence".

== History ==
In 1995, Sven Ahlbäck presented a doctoral thesis on the idea that all people understand music on a deeper organized level involving more than just the element of chance or pure emotions. Sven Emtell, MSc at the Royal Institute of Technology, started together with Ahlbäck to analyze on how to realize the music cognition model digitally, but for different reasons the project ended. In 2008, the two met again and decide to continue with the project.

- 2011: The first beta version of ScoreCleaner is available.
- 2013: ScoreCleaner is launched in Europe, Asia and the United States.
- 2013: Gold and Silver medals at Cannes Lions Festival in June.
- 2014: ScoreCleaner changes name to ScoreCloud.
- 2018: ScoreCloud 4 is released.

== See also ==
- List of scorewriters
- Comparison of scorewriters
- List of music software
