= Liquid Rhythm =

- Developer(s): WaveDNA
- Stable release: 1.4.5.2 / July 2015
- Written in: Java_(programming_language), Max_(software), C++
- Operating system: Microsoft Windows, macOS
- Type: Music software
- License: Proprietary
- Website: www.wavedna.com

Liquid Rhythm is a beat sequencing and rhythm generation software developed by WaveDNA and initially released in 2010. The software’s core technology, the Music Molecule, visualizes patterns and relationships between MIDI notes and allows users to create and edit note clusters and patterns rather than individual notes. Liquid Rhythm operates as a standalone program for macOS and Windows, and as a DAW plug-in in the Max for Live, VST, AU, and RTAS formats.

== The Music Molecule ==
Liquid Rhythm is based on WaveDNA’s patented Music Molecule technology, which visualizes notes and rests in BeatForms. BeatForms are one 8th note long with the number of note events indicated by the colour of the BeatForm: red BeatForms contain three note events, blue BeatForms contain two note events, and purple BeatForms contain one. BarForms are groups of BeatForms that are one bar in length. By grouping these notes into modular containers, the Music Molecule provides structure to raw MIDI and captures the relationships between notes. The Music Molecule engine is patented in both the USA and Canada.

== Features ==
Liquid Rhythm’s main ‘view’ is the Arranger window, where users can create and edit BarForms and BeatForms. Users begin by selecting an instrument and dragging it onto a slot in the Arranger. There are a wide selection of genre-based sounds, ranging from Acoustic to Techno, within the program. Users can import custom sample libraries as well. There are a number of features in the software for the formulation of entire BarForms as well as for editing minuscule details of the rhythms.

Liquid Rhythm populates the BarForm List with commonly occurring BarForms for the chosen instrument and includes a number of filters to refine the selection. Below the BarForm List is the BeatForm Sequencer, a grid that allows users to insert different BeatForms into each of the eight sections in the selected BarForm. The other BarForm creation tool is the BeatWeaver, wherein the user chooses a series of BeatForms and the BeatWeaver creates every possible combination that can be weaved into a BarForm.

The Accent Modifiers set the MIDI velocity and timing based on the BeatForm accent color as well as give users the ability set a range to “humanize” velocity and timing. The GrooveMover changes the arrangement of notes in the bar and the BeatForm Tumblers increases the complexity of a rhythm selection. The Randomizer will populate a selected portion of the Arranger with a random rhythm created within user-set parameters.

== Development ==
In the 1980s, Vice President and Lead Inventor at WaveDNA, David Beckford worked with The University of Toronto’s music cognition lab to study how musicians visualize and conceptualize music. This led to his extensive work in trying to unify MIDI and traditional music notations into a new and integrated language for musicians. By 2009, David Beckford had developed a software prototype that allowed him to isolate and catalogue different rhythmic, melodic, and harmonic characteristics and manipulate them digitally. After partnering with Douglas Mummenhoff (CEO), the two founded WaveDNA.

== See also ==
- List of music software
