= Igor Engraver =

Music notation software

Igor Engraver is a scorewriter for the Macintosh and Windows operating systems, created by Swedish composer Peter Bengtson and published by the Swedish company NoteHeads. Bengtson stated on the Igor-Talk mailing list that he named Igor after the stock character in various horror movies (including the Frankenstein films), and to commemorate Russian composer Igor Stravinsky.

Despite delays in publishing the first version, Igor Engraver was widely praised for its unprecedented ease of use and revolutionary user interface. Users also appreciated its ability to automatically create instrument parts from full scores rather than requiring them to be created separately. (This feature first appeared in the notation program Composer's Mosaic, but Igor's is one of the earliest implementations, well before those of Sibelius and Finale.)

Igor is written almost entirely in the Lisp programming language.

For a short time, Igor was released as freeware with the hope that online sales of scores would finance it. This was cancelled after it was found unfeasible.

In 2002, Peter Bengtson retired from active involvement in the company, which is now owned by Björn Ulvaeus (formerly of the pop group ABBA), Christer Sturmark (a Swedish author, I.T. entrepreneur and debater on religion and humanism), Per Gessle (a member of the pop groups Gyllene Tider and Roxette), and Cons T. Åhs (a computer science researcher).

The original Igor website URL www.noteheads.com redirects now to the page of Christer Sturmark; no new version of the program has been released. In 2009, a notice appeared on the website's original home page, addressing rumours about NoteHeads which had circulated on the Internet (without saying what the rumours were). It declared that the company was under new ownership, that a new version of Igor would be released in the near future, and that it would be free for users of version 1.7 (the last published version). There has been no activity since then.

In 2024, Peter Bengtson commenced development of the open source scorewriter Ooloi, labelled as the spiritual successor to Igor. It shares no code with Igor Engraver but shares and expands on many of its ideas while also adding true simultaneous collaboration.

== See also ==
- List of music software
