= Director Musices =

Music software

Director Musices is computer software produced by the Department of Speech, Music and Hearing at KTH Royal Institute of Technology. It aims to give an expressive, human-like performance to a musical score by varying the volume and timing of the notes. Director Musices is written in CMU Common Lisp and distributed as free software. It processes MIDI files.

== See also ==
- Sibelius (software) a commercial program that also includes automatically expressive playing
- List of music software
