= MultitrackStudio =

Digital audio workstation

- Original author: Bremmers Audio Design
- Developer: Bremmers Audio Design
- Release: November 2001; 24 years ago
- Stable release: 11.4.2 / 20 October 2026; 9 days ago
- Operating system: OS X, Windows, iPad
- Type: Digital audio workstation
- License: Proprietary, Freemium
- Website: www.multitrackstudio.com

MultitrackStudio is a digital audio workstation application for macOS (OS X), Windows and iPad platforms.

It is developed and maintained by a small company (Bremmers Audio Design, The Netherlands) led by Giel Bremmers.

This software can be used for any musical genre and its main key aspect is the simple and original user interface, while enabling powerful and flexible features often not found even in more popular and expensive products.

An iPad version was released in 2014.

In recent years, MultitrackStudio has been at the forefront of implementing MIDI 2.0 in a DAW.

== Features ==
In spite of its moderate pricing, MultitrackStudio has most of the features of a standard full DAW: audio/MIDI recording, MIDI sequencing, mixing, audio effects, variable time signatures, multi MIDI editing, MIDI streams, automation, control surfaces, remote control, etc. Stock instruments have limited quality, but they can be easily replaced with free or commercial CLAP, VST and AU plugins. The Mac version also integrates a Soundfont Player.

== Versions ==
The desktop version is available under three options:

- Lite (free of charge, limited to 3 tracks)
- Standard (paid, almost all features and no track limit)
- Pro (paid, with additional advanced features)

== See also ==
- Comparison of digital audio editors
- Comparison of MIDI editors and sequencers
- List of music software
- Multitrack recording
- Music sequencer
- Music Workstation
