= Free Studio =

Software application

- Developer: DVDVideoSoft Ltd.
- Release: 1 July 2008; 18 years ago
- Stable release: 6.7.7.1110 / November 2022
- Written in: C++ with Qt, C#
- Operating system: Microsoft Windows
- Size: 57.22 MB
- Available in: 23 languages
- License: Crippleware
- Website: dvdvideosoft.com

DVDVideoSoft Ltd.
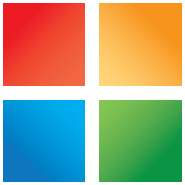
- Type: Private Limited Company
- Industry: Software
- Founded: 2006
- Headquarters: United Kingdom
- Area served: Worldwide
- Products: Free Studio, Free YouTube to MP3 Converter, Free Audio Converter, Free Video Editor, Free Video Call Recorder for Skype, Free YouTube Download
- Website: dvdvideosoft.com

Free Studio is a freeware set of multimedia computer programs developed by DVDVideoSoft. The programs are available in one integrated package and also as separate downloads (Free Studio Manager is included in both).

== Overview ==
The Free Studio software bundle consists of about 48 programs, grouped into several sections: YouTube, MP3 & Audio, CD-DVD-BD, DVD & Video, Photo & Images, Mobiles, Apple Devices, and 3D. The largest group is the DVD & Video section containing 14 different applications. Mobiles section is the second largest group with 13 programs. However, the YouTube section, particularly YouTube downloading programs, has gained more popularity among users. The programs have been tested and endorsed by a dozen of software portals and have won awards from these sites. Free Studio is most popular in Germany, Greece, Italy, and the United States. It is also popular in Japan, France, and the United Kingdom. Some of the programs in the package are free and open-source software.

== History ==
DVDVideoSoft project was launched in 2006 by company Digital Wave Ltd., for software development to produce multimedia application software. The founders distributed paid software as an affiliate at the start, later their own products appeared on the site. Free YouTube Download was the first successful program, then DVDVideoSoft created and launched several other 'Free YouTube' applications. Later on upon users' requests DVDVideoSoft started developing other kinds of applications including media converters etc. Today DVDVideoSoft offers up to 49 different programs for video, audio and image processing individually or integrated into the Free Studio package.

== Features ==
DVDVideoSoft YouTube programs can be used to download YouTube videos in their original format and convert them to AVI, DVD, MP4, WMV etc. or different audio formats. YouTube section contains Free Video Call Recorder for Skype button, but the program itself is not included into FS installation (it has to be downloaded and installed separately).

The "MP3 & Audio" section consists of the programs which convert audio files between different formats, convert audio files to Flash for web, extract audio from video files, edit audio files (Free Audio Dub), rip and burn CDs.

Free Image Convert and Resize

Enclosed in the CD-DVD-BD section are the applications that enable users to burn files and folders to discs, to convert videos to a DVD format and vice versa, to burn CDs, and to copy music from audio CDs into files.

The "DVD and Video" section contains several desktop video and DVD converters. Some of the programs can flip, rotate and cut (Free Video Dub) videos. One of the most popular programs from the section is Free Video Dub. Converted videos are now, contrary to previous versions, watermarked if no paid membership is present.

Free Studio includes several applications for Apple phones, iPods and other devices.

The Mobiles section contains a dozen video converters for various mobile devices such as cell phones, Tablets and Game consoles. They convert videos to play them on (BlackBerry, HTC, LG phones, Sony/Sony Ericsson, Nintendo, Xbox, Motorola phones, etc.)

The "Photo & Images" section incorporates the programs for image conversion and resizing, extracting JPEG frames from videos (Free Video To JPEG Converter), recording screen activities, making screenshots (Free Screen Recorder).

The 3D section is composed of the programs to make 3D videos and 3D images. There are several algorithms which allow to create different types of 3D images.

== Supported formats ==
=== Video formats ===
Input: .avi; .ivf; .div; .divx; .mpg; .mpeg; .mpe; .mp4; .m4v; .wmv; .asf; .webm; .mkv; .mov; .qt; .ts; .mts; .m2t; .m2ts; .mod; .tod; .vro; .dat; .3gp2; .3gpp; .3gp; .3g2; .dvr-ms; .flv; .f4v; .amv; .rm; .rmm; .rv; .rmvb; .ogv; DVD video

Output: .mp4; .wmv; .avi; .mkv; .webm; .flv; .swf; .mov; .3gp; .m2ts; DVD video

=== Audio formats ===
Input: .mp3 .wav; .aac; .m4a; .m4b; .wma; .ogg; .flac; .ra; .ram; .amr; .ape; .mka; .tta; .aiff; .au; .mpc; .spx; .ac3; audio cd

Output: .mp3; .m4a; .aac; .wav; .wma; .ogg; .flac; .ape; audio CD

=== Image formats ===
Input: .jpg, .png, .bmp, .gif, .tga

Output: .jpg, .png, .bmp, .gif, .tga, .pdf

== Reception ==
The programs have been tested and endorsed by Chip Online, Tucows, SnapFiles, Brothersoft, and Softonic and have won awards from these sites. Free Studio is most popular in Germany, United States and Italy. It is also popular in Japan, France and the United Kingdom.

The most popular applications, according to CNET statistics, include Free YouTube to MP3 Converter, Free Video to MP3 Converter, Free MP4 Video Converter and Free YouTube Download. Other programs with high rank: Free AVI Video Converter, Free Video Editor, Free Audio Converter and Free Studio in a whole.

== Criticism ==
Free Studio (as can be common for freeware packages) is criticized for toolbar and Web search engine installation. Older versions have also included OpenCandy, which is loaded automatically, with no request for user approval. There can be difficulties installing only the programs needed without installing bundled extra programs.

In March 2017, DVDVideoSoft announced that it had stopped showing other products' ads during installation and removed all toolbars, search engines, and OpenCandy.

== See also ==
- List of audio conversion software
