= Compositor =

Compositor may refer to:

- Compositor (typesetting), a person or machine which arranged movable type for printing
  - Paige Compositor, a device developed to replace manual compositors, which was a commercial failure
- Compositing software, used in film post-production for compositing, special effects, and color correction
- Compositing window manager, a software process which composites off-screen buffers for each open window to create a screen image
  - Quartz Compositor, the display server and window manager in macOS
  - Wayland compositor, any computer display server compatible with the Wayland protocol

== See also ==
- Composer, a person who writes music
- Compositing, the process or technique of combining visual elements from separate sources into single images
