= WMA Convert =

Software for file conversion

- Developer: Ramka Ltd.
- Stable release: 4.5.4
- Operating system: Microsoft Windows
- Available in: English
- Type: Audio and Video file converter
- License: Commercial
- Website: www.wma-convert.com

WMA Convert is a software created for audio and video files conversion.

== Features ==
The program supports conversion of MP3, M4A AAC, WAV, WMA audio file formats and MP4, WMV, AVI video formats. Also coverts M4P files to MP3. The option "convert directly to the iPod" is available.

Software is capable with all most common audio file formats for portable media players. Removes DRM protection legally, because it is capable to bypass restriction using a unique audio and video converting mechanism.

== See also ==
- List of audio formats
- List of music software
- Comparison of video converters
