= Soundtrap =

Online freemium music and audio editor

Soundtrap AB
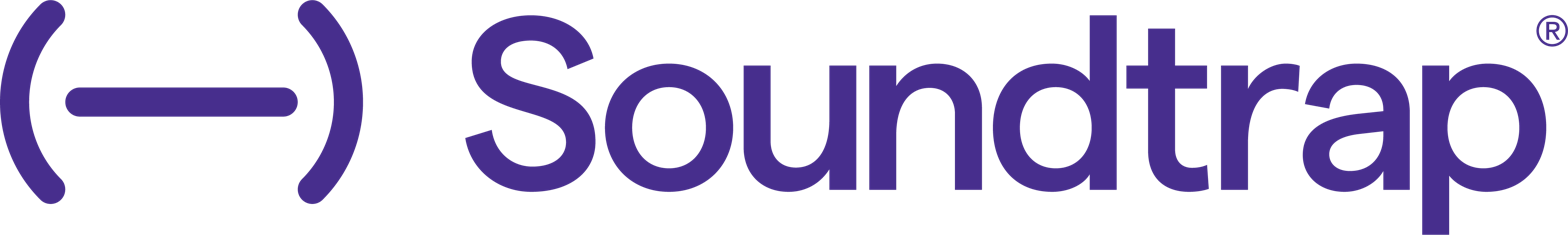
- Type: Private
- Industry: Music, podcast
- Founded: April 1, 2012; 14 years ago
- Founders: Björn Melinder, Fredrik Posse, Gabriel Sjöberg, Per Emanuelsson
- Headquarters: Stockholm, Sweden
- Key people: Per Emanuelsson (CEO)
- Website: soundtrap.com

Soundtrap is a freemium online cross-platform digital audio workstation (DAW) for browsers that allows users to create music or podcasts. The DAW is operated by Soundtrap AB, which was bought by Spotify in November 2017 and sold back to its founders in 2023. Soundtrap is offered in 15 languages, including English, Spanish, French, German, and Swedish, with the latter four being added in 2017.

The DAW includes inputs for external instruments, an instrument player, a way to input and export MIDI files, collaboration features, Patterns BeatMaker (introduced in 2017) and a real-time Vocal Tuner.

== History ==
Soundtrap and Soundtrap AB were founded April 1, 2012 in Stockholm, Sweden by Björn Melinder, Fredrik Posse, Gabriel Sjöberg, and Per Emanuelsson, who believed that it was too "complex to make music" and who wanted to create a studio with collaboration and “a full production environment where you can do professional-sounding podcasts, collaboratively done on the web.” Soundtrap Studio was launched in beta in 2013. The next year, it was featured at Google I/O. In 2016, Soundtrap raised $6 million in their Series A round of financing.

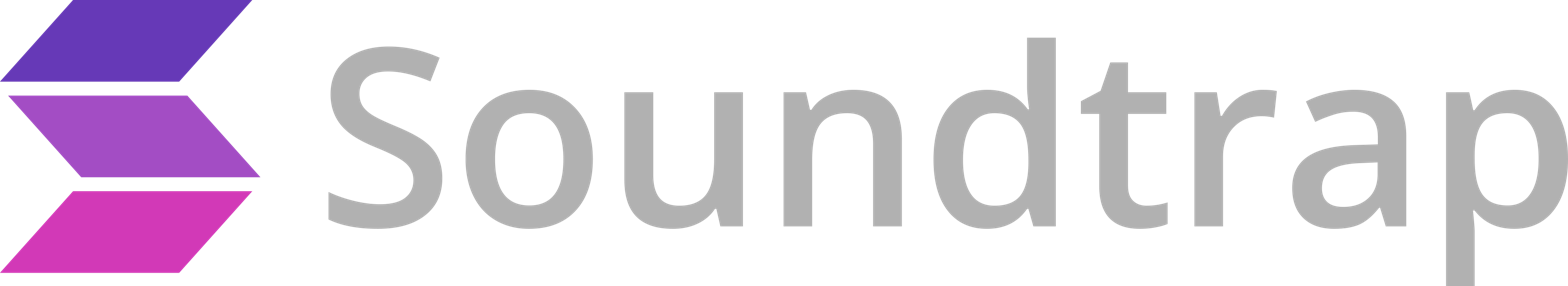
Soundtrap's logo from 2013 to 2017.

In November 2017, Spotify acquired Soundtrap, with Soundtrap stating that the move was a "culturally, creatively and strategically" great fit. The company had revenues of 900,000 kronor, making it one of Spotify's most expensive acquisitions.

In 2018, Soundtrap won the EdTech Awards for the Arts, Music, Creative Solutions Category. The next year, it offered unlimited projects for the free tier without having to upgrade to a better plan.

Spotify sold Soundtrap back to its founders in 2023, stating that they were "proud of what we’ve achieved together, and are excited to see Soundtrap’s next phase of growth over the coming years."

== Programs ==
Soundtrap
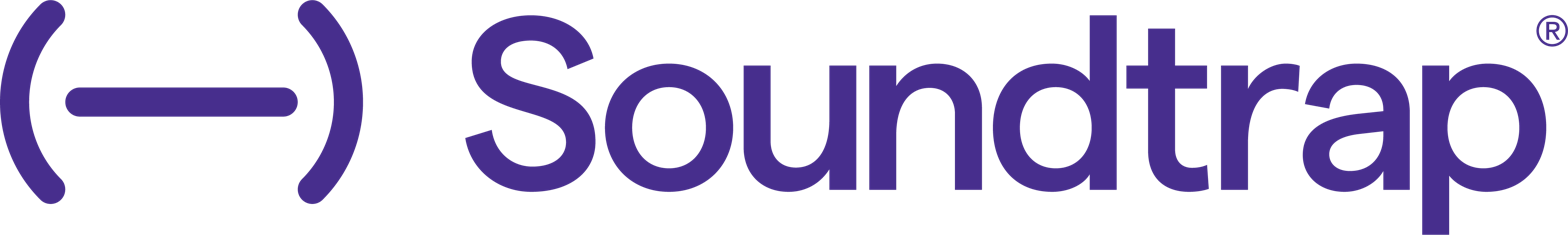
- Developer: Soundtrap AB
- Release: 2013; 13 years ago
- Operating system: macOS, Windows, ChromeOS, Linux, iOS, Android
- Available in: 15 languages
- Website: www.soundtrap.com

Soundtrap is split into three programs: Soundtrap for Music Makers, Soundtrap for Podcasters, and Soundtrap for Education.

=== Soundtrap for Education ===
Soundtrap for Education was introduced in 2015, being showcased in 2016 at the Future of Education Technology Conference as a way for teachers and students of all ages to explore creative sound making in a safe and secure environment as well as at home. The program is COPPA, GDPR and FERPA compliant and is compatible with Google Classroom and Soundtrap for Storytellers.

The program was named "The Best Website for Teaching and Learning" in 2015 by the American Association of School Librarians and was featured on Google for Education's "Creative Apps for Chromebooks" in 2016. It was also given by Common Sense Media, saying that the dashboard was easy to use and that the "extensive video tutorials and support features facilitate use of this tool to its fullest potential."

In March 2020, Soundtrap for Education was made free for the fall semester due to the COVID-19 pandemic. That same year, it was named the "Music Education Solution of the Year" by EdTech.

=== Soundtrap for Podcasters ===
Soundtrap for Storytellers was introduced on May 24, 2019 as a way for people to create podcasts. It was renamed in 2024 to Soundtrap for Podcasters. The program includes a transcript feature which can record and automatically transcribe a voice, a tool to edit the transcript, and a tool for managing shows and episodes as well as directly upload podcasts to Spotify. Then in October 2019, the transcription feature was expanded to include French, Spanish, German, Brazilian Portuguese, Portuguese and Swedish. The program also has a way to remotely interview guests and to create your own jingle.

The program was created to help podcasters with editing, transcribing, remote interviewing, and adding sound effects, as well as having one platform to create podcasts with. According to the CEO of Soundtrap AB, Per Emanuelsson, Soundtrap for Podcasters "helps teachers differentiate instruction for students of all abilities within one classroom, giving students a compelling way to channel their thoughts and perspectives."

Soundtrap for Podcasters has been described as the "Google Docs of podcasting."

=== Soundtrap for Music Makers ===
Soundtrap for Music Makers was introduced in 2020 and offers more features than the free tier. Premium Soundtrap comes in four paid subscription plans, Sound Starter, Music Production, Vocals & Songwriting, Production & Vocals. The paid plans come with additional and full instruments and effects, and complete sample packs with loops, one-shots and Sound FX. The paid tiers also offer sounds from Freesound.org.
