= Spire (synthesizer) =

Software synthesizer

- Developer: Reveal Sound
- Release: September 1, 2013
- Stable release: 1.5.11
- Operating system: Microsoft Windows, Mac OS X
- Type: Synthesizer plugin
- License: Proprietary

Spire is the first software synthesizer developed by Reveal Sound. The synthesizer utilizes multipurpose oscillators, filters, and effects units within a digital graphic interface. Spire combines elements from both Analog and software synthesizers. The synthesizer utilizes wavetable synthesis. The software can be run by itself or within a digital audio workstation. The plugin has been used almost exclusively in dance music.

== Synthesis ==
Spire combines multiple forms of digital synthesis with reproductions of classic analog synthesis techniques. The synthesis techniques used by Spire are most easily described as subtractive, although the options available are much more complex than most real analog synthesizers. There are seven modes available for each oscillator: Classic, Noise, FM, HardFM, SawPWM, AMSync, and Vowel. The sounds from the four oscillators can then be routed to the modulation units, which include four envelopes, four Low Frequency Oscillators, two step sequencers, and routing matrix. There is also an effects section, which contains five effects: delay, phaser, chorus, reverb, and waveshaping.
