= VirtualDJ =

Audio/video mixing software

- Developer: Atomix Productions
- Release: July 1, 2003; 23 years ago
- Stable release: 2026 (BUILD 9644) / September 21, 2026; 27 days ago
- Operating system: mac OS, Windows
- Type: Music software
- License: Proprietary
- Website: www.virtualdj.com

VirtualDJ (VDJ) is audio and video mixing software for DJs on Microsoft Windows and macOS, developed by Atomix Productions.

== History ==
The first version of VirtualDJ appeared on 1 July 2003. VirtualDJ is the successor to AtomixMP3, the first version of which dates from September 2000. Development of AtomixMP3 stopped in December 2003, following the release of its successor, VirtualDJ. VirtualDJ existed in three different versions until 2009: Home Edition (sold in stores), PRO (only available online), and Limited Version (free with certain MIDI controllers). In late 2009, a new version called VirtualDJ Basic went on sale as a budget-friendly alternative to VirtualDJ Pro, without MIDI control.

Since May 2014, following the release of version 8, five licence options have been available: Pro Infinity (the full version, one time purchase, free updates), Pro Subscription (same access as Pro Infinity but a monthly subscription charge), Business (same access as Pro Infinity with addition support services), Home Plus (Hardware control limited to a single device type), Home User (No hardware control other than a 10 minute trial when you start the software).

In 2010, VirtualDJ won the prize for best mixing software at the 25th edition of the Annual International Dance Music Awards in Miami.

== Features ==
The software uses a default layout consisting of two virtual turntables (vinyl or CD) and a central mixer. It includes a bar for viewing the status of the two audio tracks as well as the management of the playlist and of current readings with a search function in the database. The current track of the different decks appears in a graphical window at the top of the screen which visualizes the curve (waveform) of the live sound. The user can also perform loops of variable duration. As a professional DJ software, VirtualDJ allows users to plug in their DJ controllers. It supports a wide range of hardware turntables and mixers.

VDJ has a scripting language, vdjscript, that allows mapping actions to hardware controls or the computer keyboard. Using this scripting language, a range of plugins are available for download, adding additional skins, pads, effects and transitions. In addition, VST3 plugins can be used to provide additional audio effects, either per deck, or on the global audio output.

VirtualDJ supports DJing with streaming music from Tidal, Deezer, Beatport, Beatsource, and SoundCloud.
