= MIDIbox =

MIDIbox is a non-commercial open source project with a series of guides on how to build musical instrument device interfaces (MIDI). Through a series of do it yourself tutorials, users are guided in the process of building a basic microcontroller that can also be used to build hardware MIDI control units for various synthesizers, multi-track recording software, and other MIDI devices; as well as stand-alone synthesizers, sequencers and other projects.

== History ==
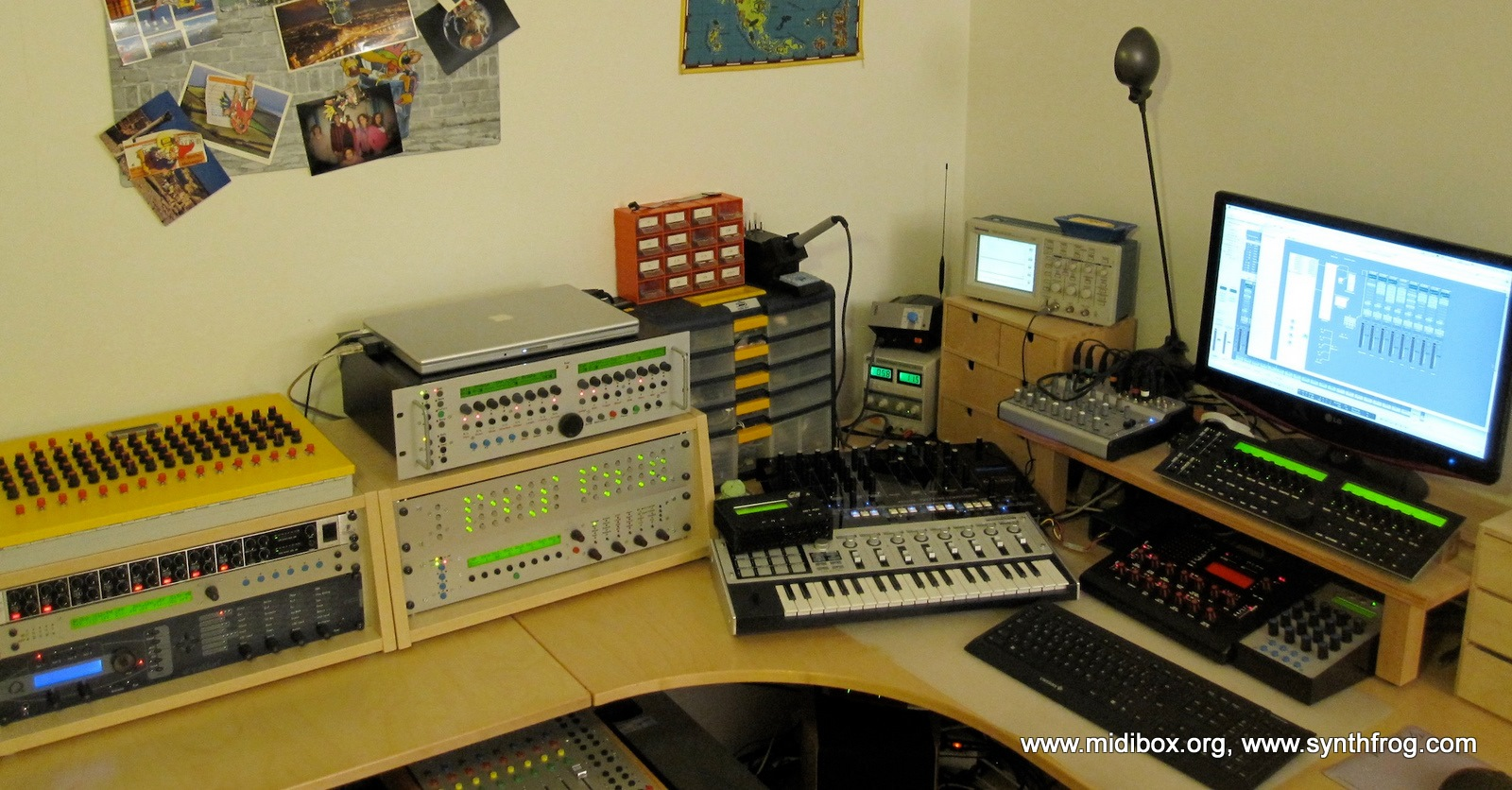
MIDIbox studio

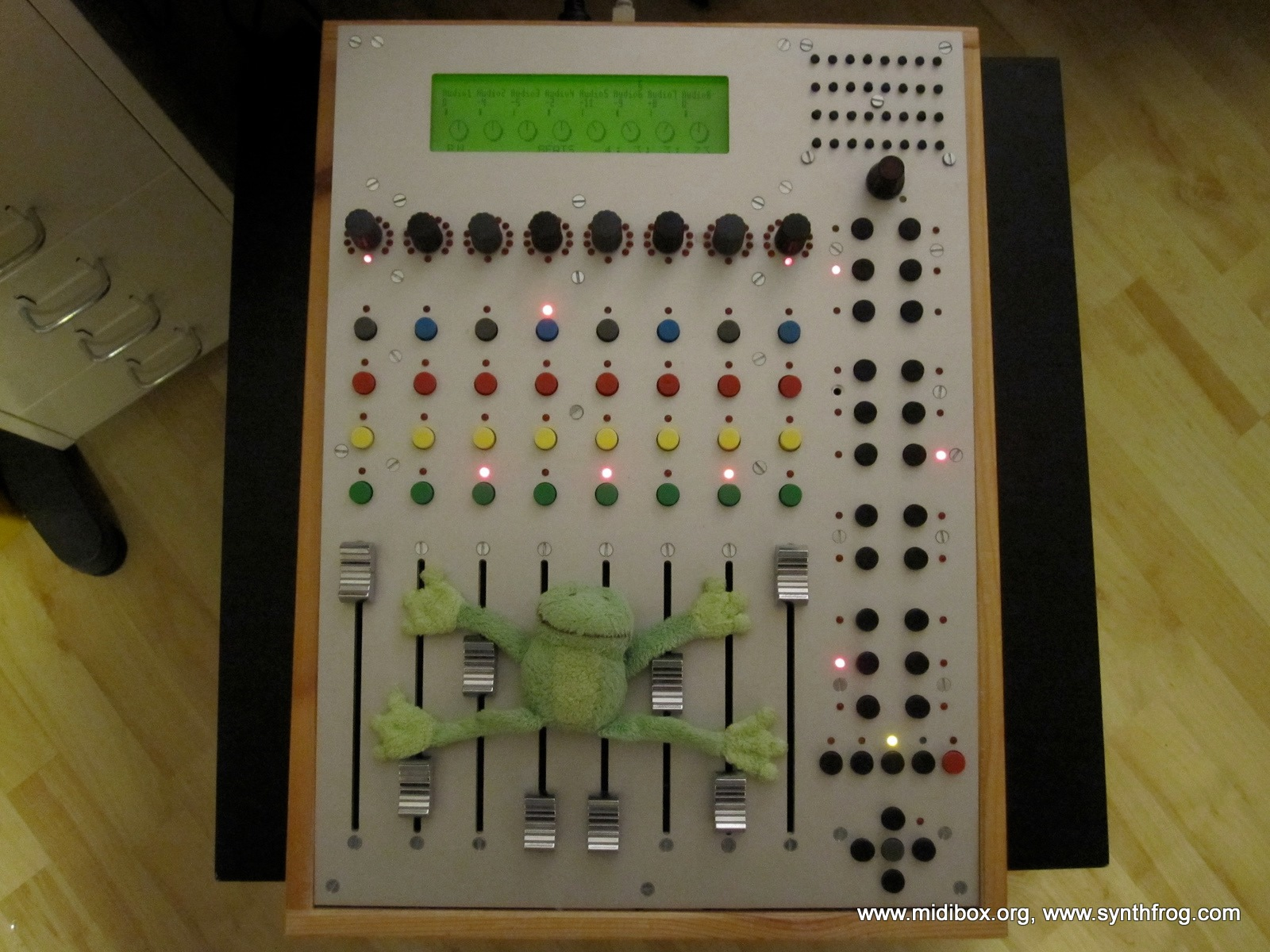
MIDI box LC

The MIDIbox Hardware Platform is the continuation of Thorsten Klose's earlier work on MIDI controllers. Designs are based around a standardized environment of reusable and exchangeable modules. Soon after the release of the first modules, a small group of enthusiasts formed and grew into a thriving open source development community.

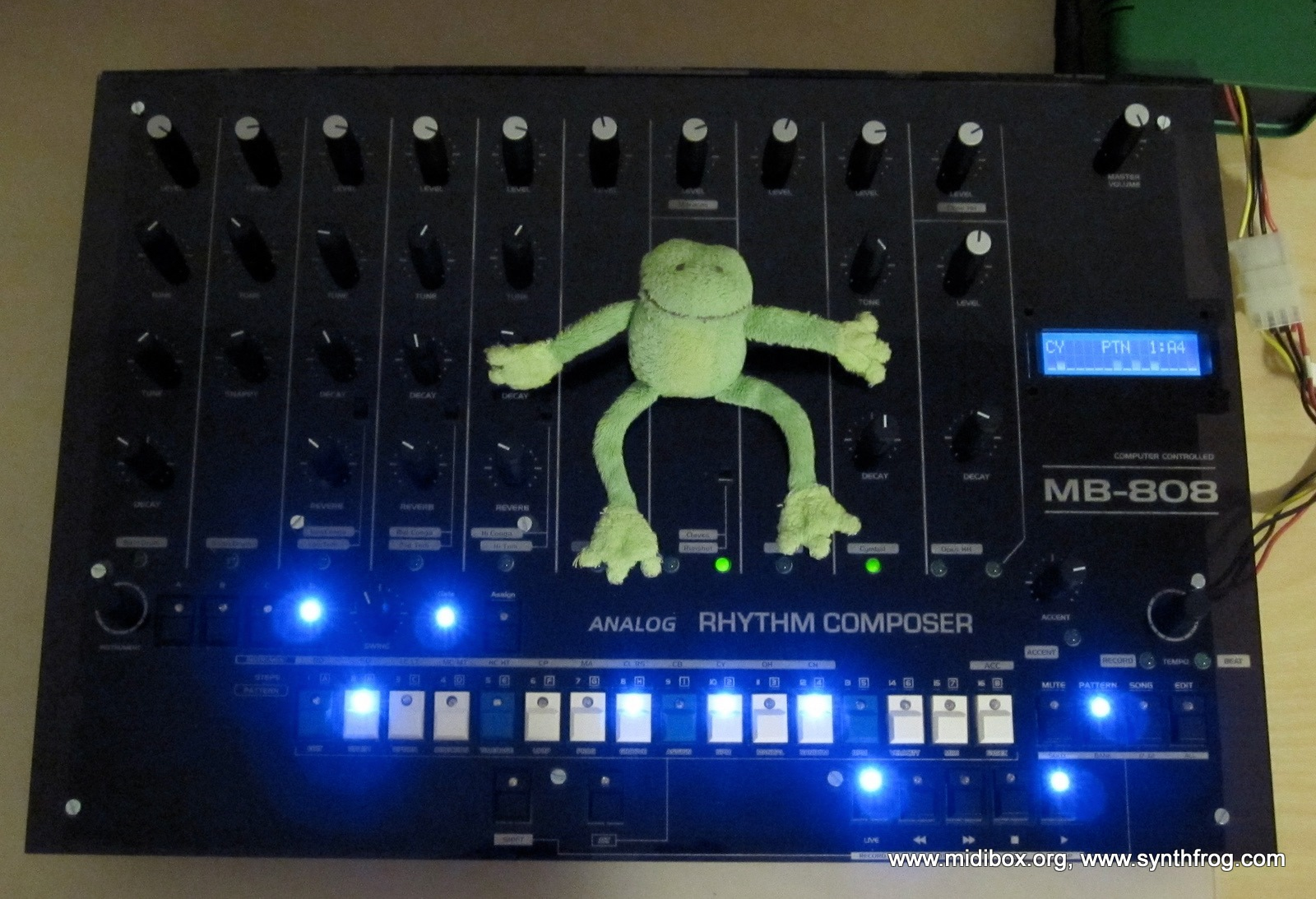
MIDIbox MB808

== The MIDIbox Hardware Platform (MBHP) ==
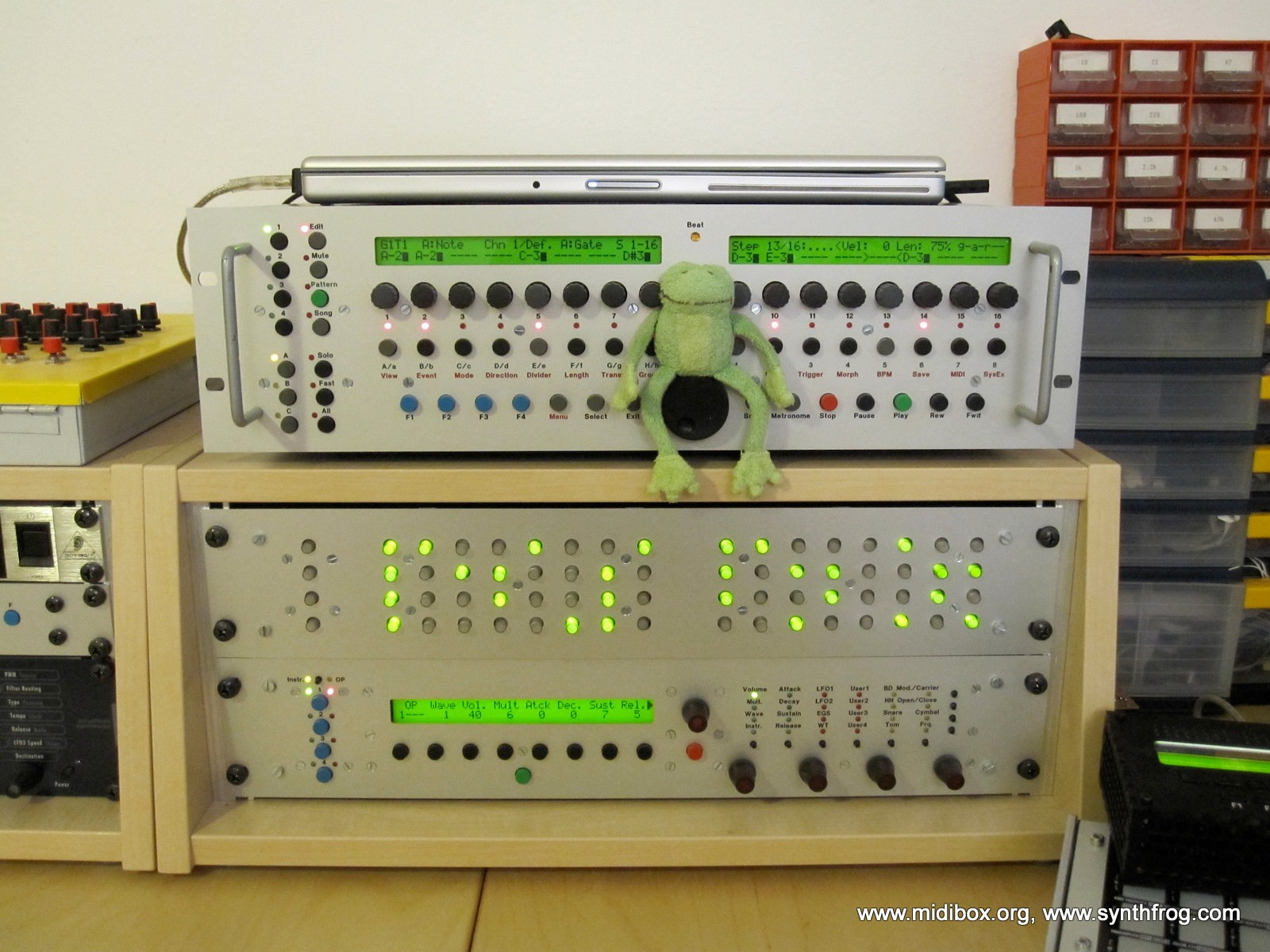
MIDIbox SEQ V3

The platform focuses on well-defined and documented modules based on small, uncomplicated circuits, to allow for amateur assembly. These modules are then assembled into a complete project. All boards can be made as single-layer PCBs and prototype boards designed with a freeware CAD program. Almost all components are through-hole for easier assembly.

The first MIDIbox hardware platform, (MBHP), was based its own open-source operating system– MIOS (MIDIbox Operating System) –written in PIC assembly language, for speed and accuracy. A C wrapper layer provides simplified coding. MIOS is designed and documented to allow simple reconfiguration, adaptation, and extension by hobbyists and enthusiasts.

The new MIDIBox Hardware Platform, MIOS32, runs on ARM-based processors LPC1769, from NXP, and STM32F407, from STMicroelectronics, and is based on a Real Time Operating System (RTOS) derived from FreeRTOS. The toolchain for MIOS32 is based on GCC, and uses only C language.

== The modules ==
Currently, about 15 separate modules are available:

=== Microcontroller modules ===
- Core Module
- PIC Programmer Modules like an actual PIC-Burner or the JDM Module

=== Input modules ===
- AIN Module Analog Input (0-5V)
- DIN Module Digital Input (ON/OFF)

=== Output modules ===
- DOUT Module Digital Output (e.g. LED ON/OFF)
- LCD Module Liquid Crystal Display
- AOUT Module Analog Out to output Voltages (for Controls)

=== Sequencer modules ===
- SEQV4 Sequencer V4

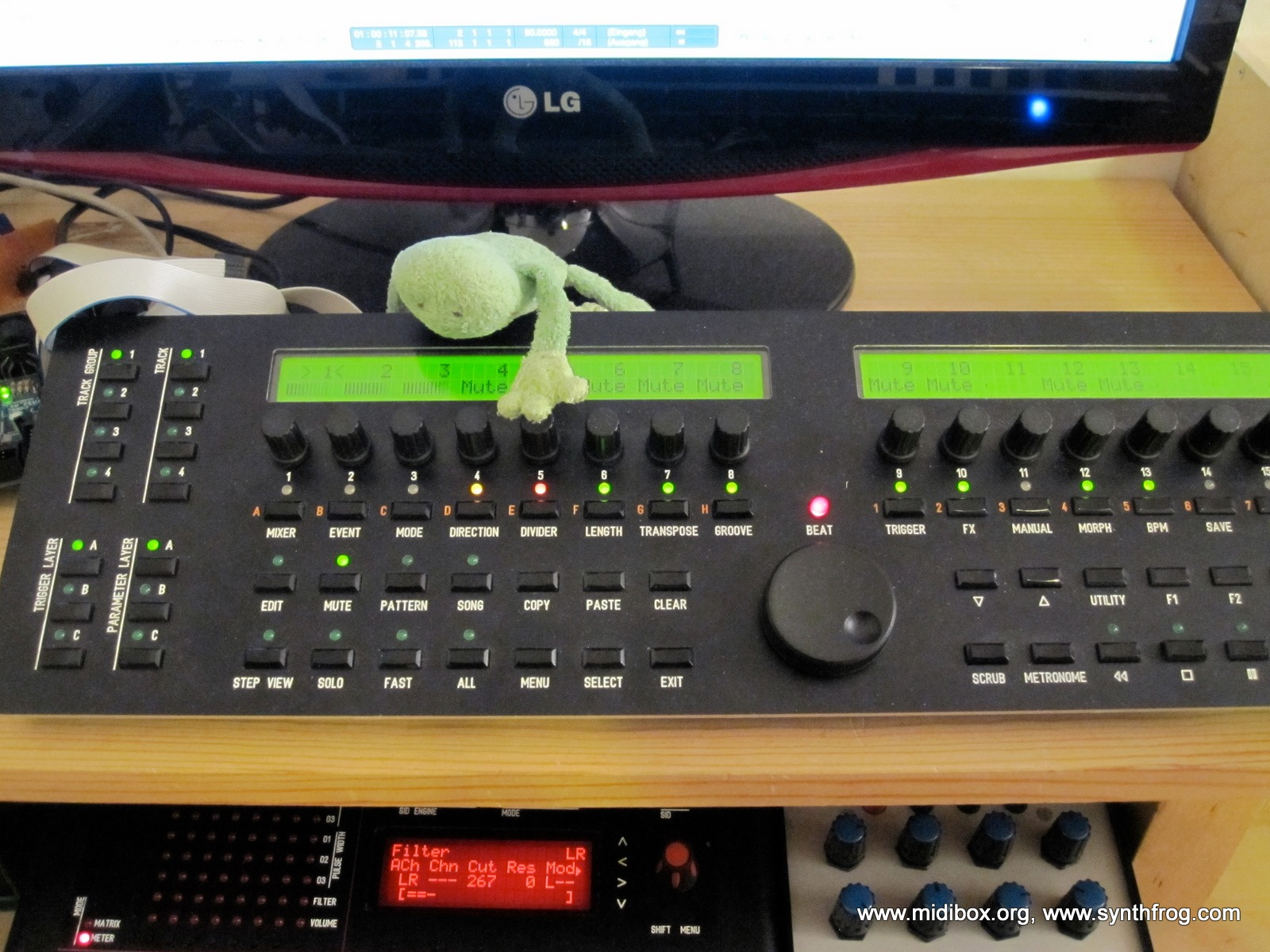
SEQV4 Sequencer V4

- SEQV4L Sequencer V4 Lite
- SEQV3 Sequencer V3

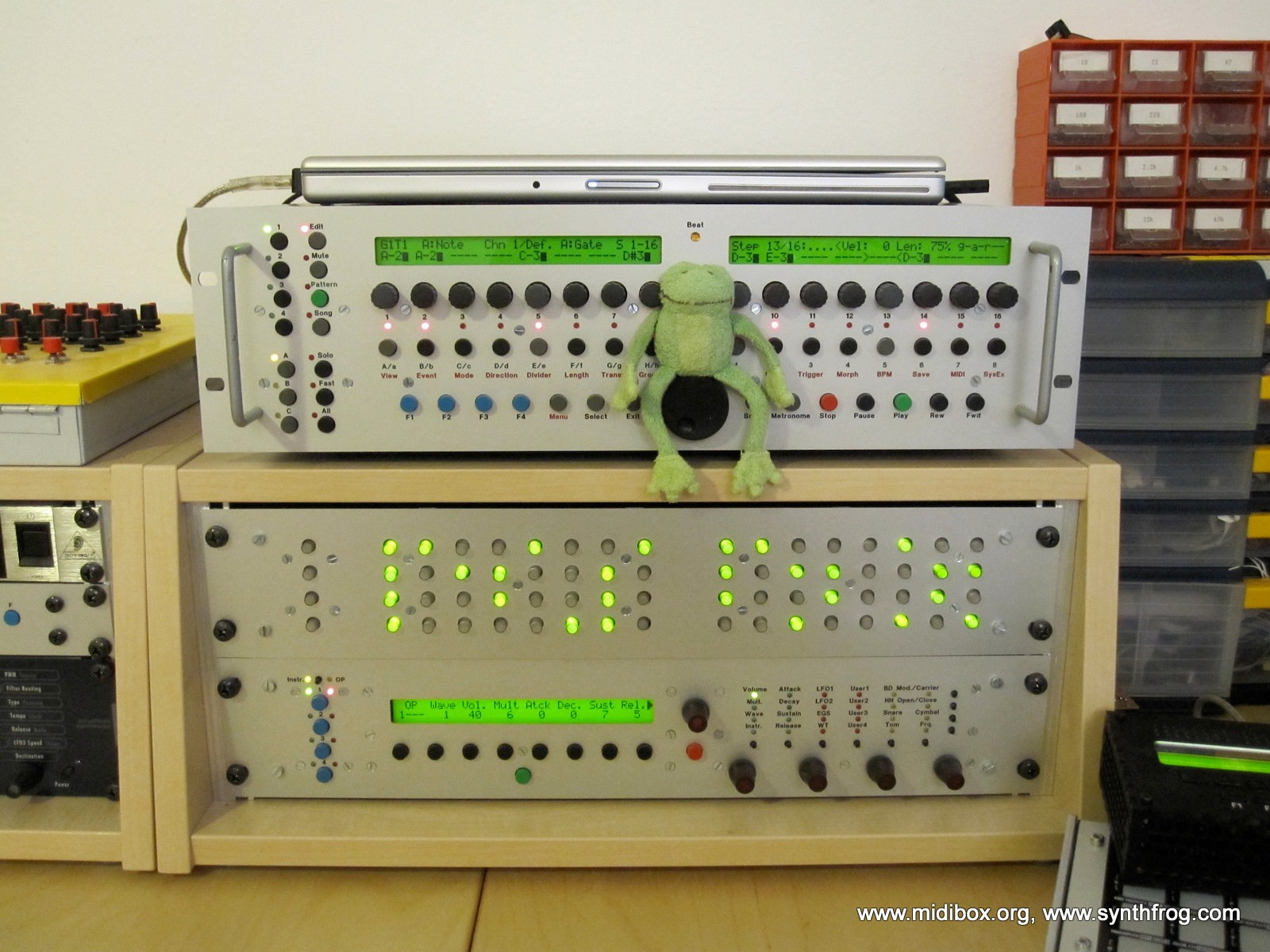
MIDIBox Seq V3 (above), MIDIBox FM (below)

=== Sound modules ===
- SID Module for the MOS Technology SID (as found in the Commodore 64)
- OPL3 Module for the FM-Chips YMF262 and YAC512
- IIC SpeakJet Module for the SpeakJet SoundChip

=== Memory expansion modules ===
- BankStick 32k / 64k Memory module

=== MIDI I/O modules ===
- LTC Module MIDI LED Indicators + 1 MIDI-Out + 1 Thru (+ 1 optional to-COM-Port)
- USB Modules PC/USB Interface

=== Miscellaneous modules ===
- MF Module to control Motorfaders
- IIC Modules to communicate to other (Microcontroller-)Devices via I2C

=== RTP-MIDI module ===
- MIOS32 firmware includes direct link to KissBox OEM RTP-MIDI module over high-speed SPI

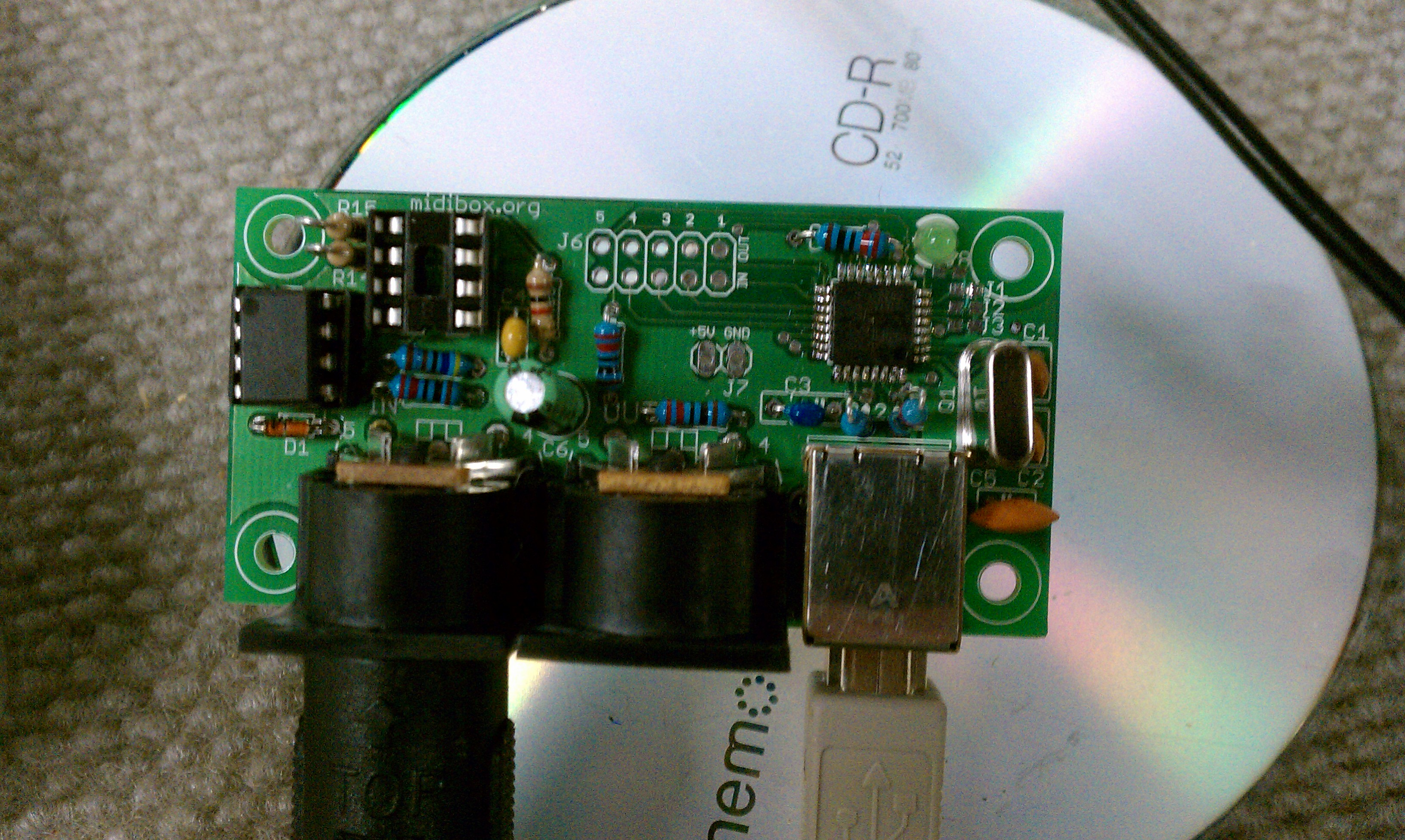
MIDIbox hardware platform (MBHP)

== The MIDIbox Operating System (MIOS) ==
The MIDIbox Operating System (MIOS) facilitates design of flexible MIDI controller applications. MIOS adheres to a non-commercial, open platform as fundamental to the exchange of ideas and personal adaptations not possible with commercial controllers.

Most controllers built by the community are based on existing documented designs, and begin life with the feature set provided by the existing firmware. End users can enhance their devices with exchangeable program code, and customize them to suit their host application, synthesizer or other MIDI device. Users can also customize to suit their own preferred workflow, or design a new project from scratch.

Application source code, module schematics and PCB layouts are available free for non-commercial use as templates for modifications and improvements. Thus MIOS and the Hardware Platform allow an easy entry to hobbyist microcontroller development, while making possible applications outside the realms of the commercial, mainstream MIDI market.

MIOS was licensed under the GPL until version 1.8. Later versions now require Thorsten Klose's permission for commercial use.

=== Specifications ===
The operating system consist of a kernel that provides user hooks to hardware and software events, and functions for interaction with Hardware Platform modules. One core module with a PIC18F452 microcontroller can handle

- up to 128 digital inputs
- up to 128 digital outputs
- up to 64 analog inputs
- character and graphical LCDs
- up to 8 BankSticks (I2C EEPROMs)
- one MIDI In and one MIDI Out, or an RS-232 serial COM port

Background drivers are available for the following control tasks:

- MIDI I/O processing
- Bootstrap loader
- Analog conversion of up to 64 pots, faders or other analog sources with a 10-bit resolution
- Motor handling for up to 8 motorized moving faders with a 10-bit resolution
- Handling of up to 64 rotary encoders
- Handling of up to 128 buttons, touch sensors or similar digital input devices
- Handling of up to 128 LEDs, relays, Digital-Analog-Converters or similar output devices. In multiplex mode a nearly unlimited number of LEDs, LED rings and LED digits can be driven
- Read/Write from/to EEPROM, Flash, and BankStick
- Linking PIC18F Core modules via MIDIbox Link

The whole operating system has been written in assembly language and has been optimized for speed. MIOS currently uses 8k of program memory and 640 bytes of RAM.

Only 75 μs is required to read 128 digital input pins and to write to 128 output pins. 16 rotary encoders are handled within 100 μs. Analog inputs are scanned in the background every 200 μs; changes larger than a definable minimum range trigger a user hook.

Up to 256 MIDI events can trigger dedicated functions; processing of the event list requires about 300 μS. MIDI events can also be processed by a user routine for sysex parsing or similar jobs. A user timer is available for time triggered code.

Support for other high-level languages apart from C is possible.

== MIOS hardware ==
The MIOS hardware is organized around the concept of MIDIBox Hardware Platform (MBHP). The MBHP are highly versatile motherboards, offering the highest possible number of connections for a given processor. Four versions of MBHP are currently available:

- MBHP for PIC16F877 and PIC18F452 (8 bits processors). The two chips are pin compatible, but the PCB needs a simple change between the two chips
- MBHP for LPC1769 (32 bits ARM7 processor)
- MBHP for STM32F407 (32 bits Cortex M4 processor)

When a project needs less I/O than the ones available on a given MBHP, the MIDIBox concept allows to create a simplified PCB dedicated to this project. This is the approach used on Sammich MIDIBox SID and Sammich MIDIBox FM. These two kits contain the original MBHP design, but with a simplified PCB, dedicated to the connection with a SID chip or a YMF262 chip.

In the case of the STM32F407 MBHP, the CPU is mounted on a module used as a daughterboard, made by ST and sold as a development board (called STM32F4 Discovery by ST). The final user does not have to deal with SMD components, the daughterboard being mounted on standard 0.1" connectors

== Complete solutions ==
At this point there are 11 fully documented projects available, as well as a large number of user projects generated by the community. The official projects are as follows:

- MIDIbox SEQ V3:

16 Track Live Step and Morph Sequencer + advanced Arpeggiator

- MIDIbox SID V1:

Hardware MIDI-controllable Synthesizer based on the MOS Technology SID (MOS6581) sound chip as shipped with the Commodore 64/128

- MIDIbox FM V1:

Hardware synthesizer based on the Yamaha YMF262 sound chip (also known as OPL3) for generating the famous FM sounds known from Soundblaster (compatible) soundcards of the early 90s

- MIDI Merger V1:

Merges two separate MIDI inputs to a single output

- MIDI Router V1:

Routes various MIDIboxes to a single MIDI port

- MIDI Processor:

Provides basic functionality to receive and transmit MIDI events

- MIDIbox CV

Provides CV and gate outputs to drive voltage controlled devices such as analog modular synthesizers

- MIDIbox 64:

Full-fledged 64 channel MIDI controller

- MIDIbox 64E V2:

Extended version of the MIDIbox 64

- MIDIO128 V2:

The MIDIO128 interface is used to drive up to 128 digital output pins and to react on up to 128 digital input pins via MIDI

- MIDIbox LC V1:

Alternative to the MIDIbox 64/64E

- MIDImon V2:

Reports events, which are transmitted over the MIDI cable, in a readable form

== See also ==
- List of music software
