= Rubato Composer =

Music composition and transformation software

Rubato Composer is free (GPL) software that allows one to compose music or transform existing music with the help of mathematical Category Theory and Topos Theory. It is currently the only software for music composition based on Category Theory. It was developed by Gérard Milmeister and Guerino Mazzola. The predecessor Presto is no longer developed and runs only on Atari computers.

== See also ==
- List of music software
