= Opusmodus =

Computer-aided music composition software

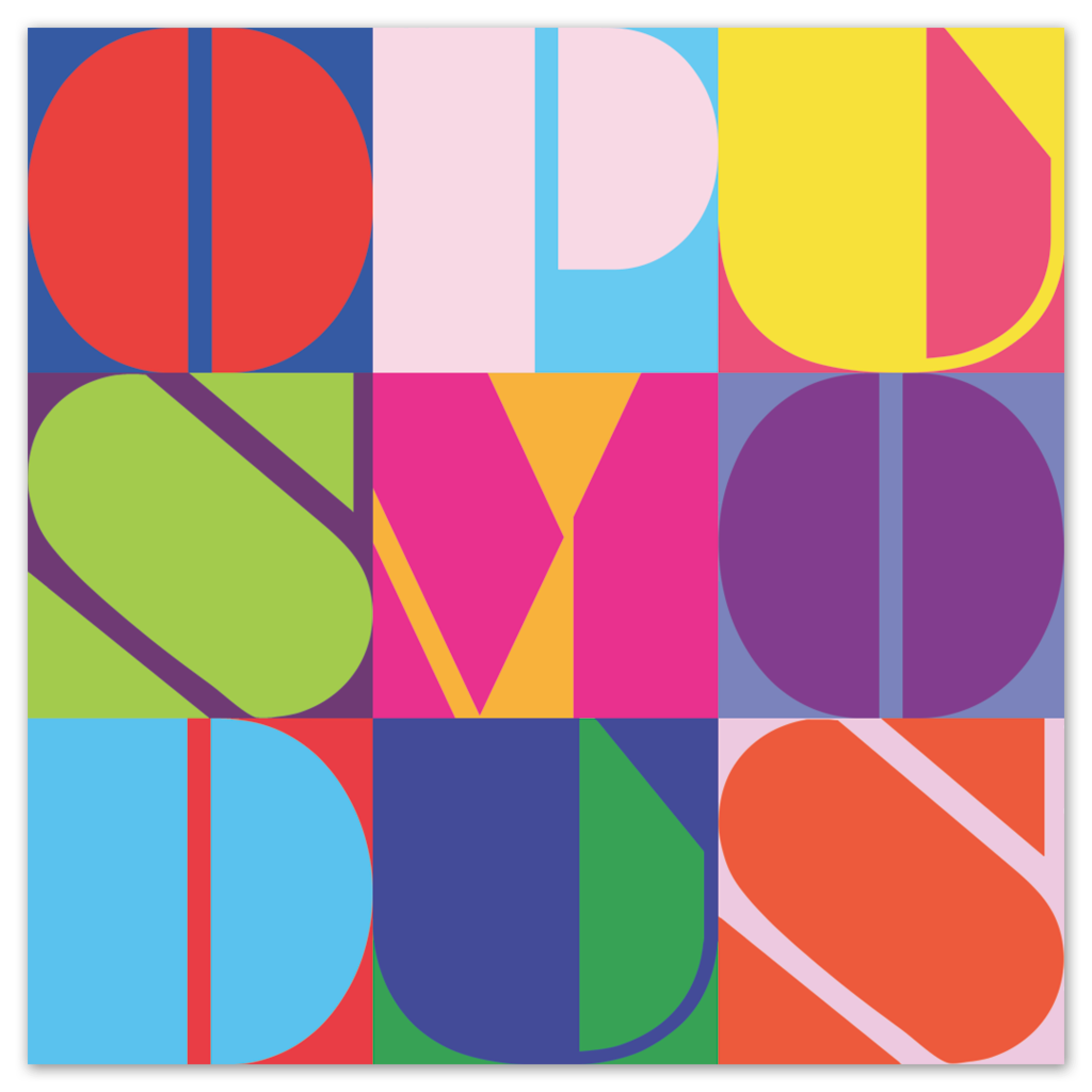
- Original author: Janusz Podrazik
- Developer: Opusmodus Ltd. 2012–2026
- Release: 2014; 12 years ago
- Stable release: 4.0.32006 / September 5, 2026; 2 months ago
- Written in: Common Lisp
- Operating system: Windows, macOS (Apple Silicon and Intel)
- Type: Parametric Composition
- License: Proprietary
- Website: opusmodus.com

Opusmodus (OM) is a computer-aided composition (CAC) software designed for algorithmic and parametric music composition. It provides an integrated environment for composers, music theorists, and researchers seeking advanced tools for generative and parametric music processes. By enabling the systematic manipulation of multiple musical parameters (including pitch, rhythm, timbre, and articulation) through a Common Lisp–based scripting interface, Opusmodus offers high degrees of flexibility and control. Its extensible design allows users to explore diverse musical styles through rule-based procedures and algorithmic manipulations, thereby facilitating experimentation and innovation in both traditional and contemporary compositional contexts.

Opusmodus is intended for composers working across diverse musical contexts, including art music, concert music, choral repertoire, film scoring, jazz, electroacoustic (Electroacoustic music) composition, music for games, new media, and popular songwriting.

== History ==
Opusmodus was conceptualised by Janusz Podrazik in the early 2010s with the aim of streamlining and revolutionising complex compositional tasks within a single platform. The core development team included Bill St. Clair, Ernst van Waning, Gail Zacharias, Greg Pfeil, Janusz Podrazik, Martin Simmons, Matthew Emerson, Yehouda Harpaz, and Zachary Beane. Drawing on techniques from computational musicology and Common Lisp language, the initial release focused on delivering a functional environment for rule-based music generation. Over subsequent releases, the software expanded to include additional libraries, real-time interaction capabilities, and an enhanced user interface.

== Features ==
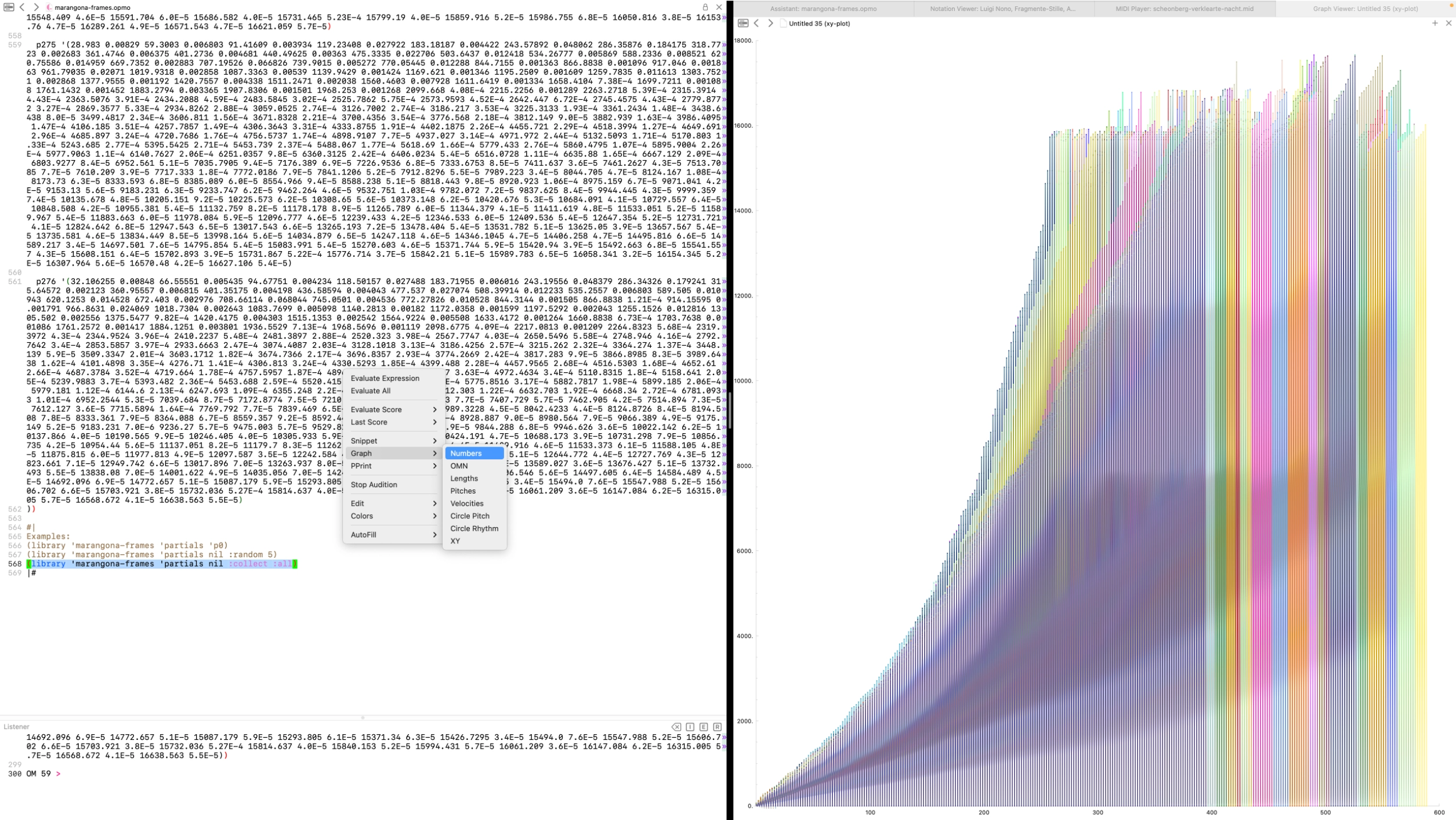
Spectral music

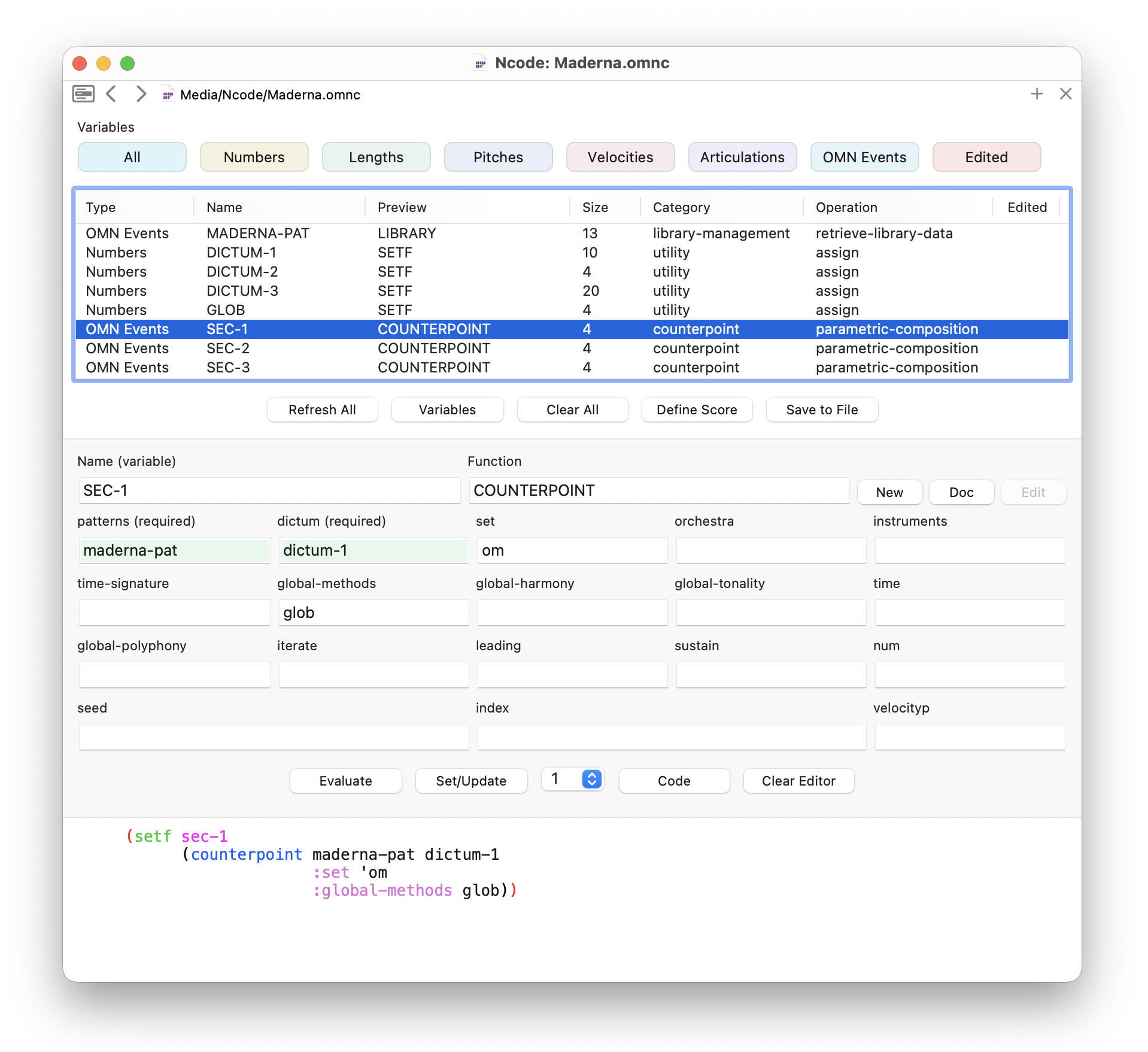
Opusmodus Ncode UI

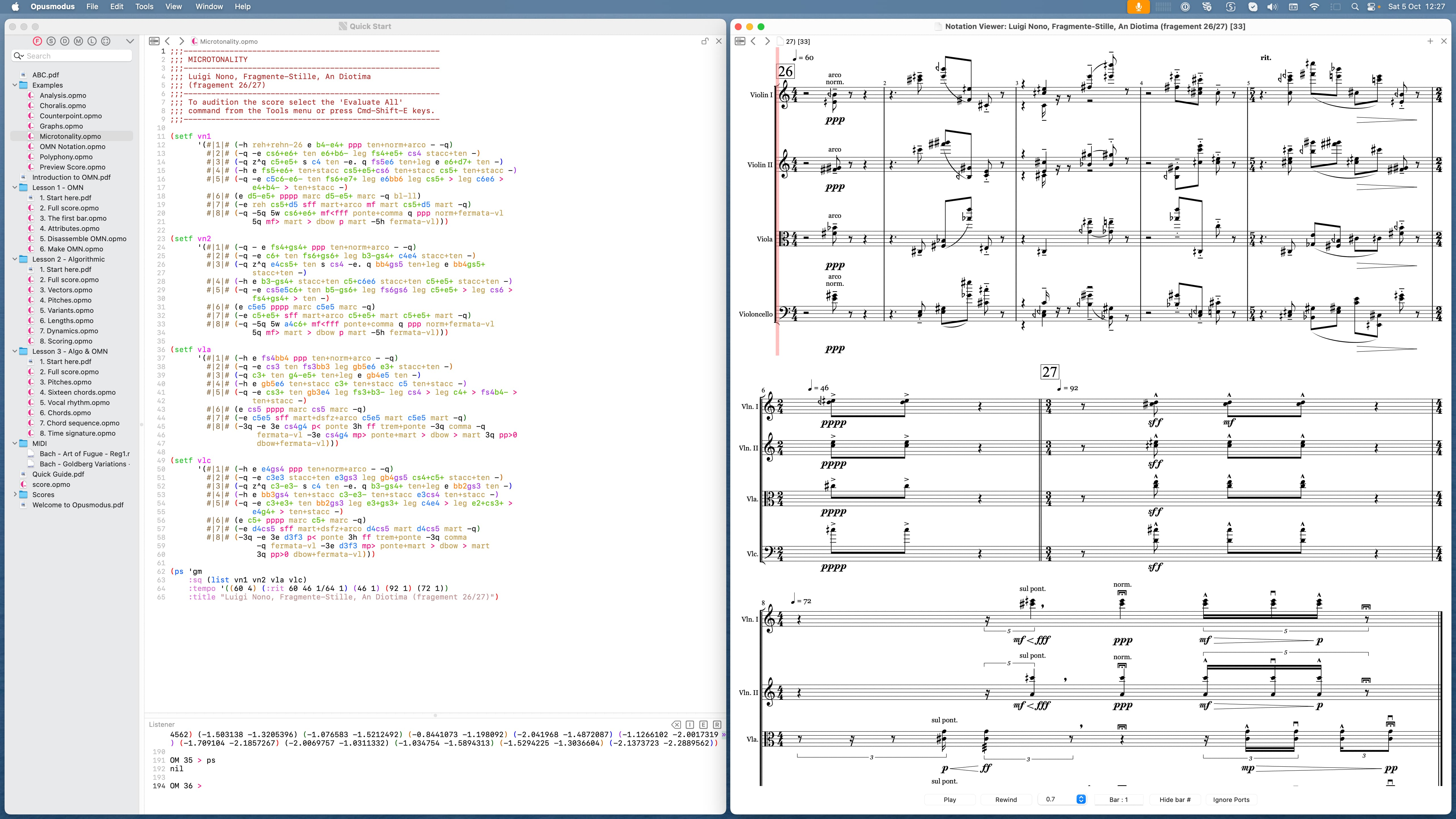
Microtonality - (OMN) Opusmodus Notation

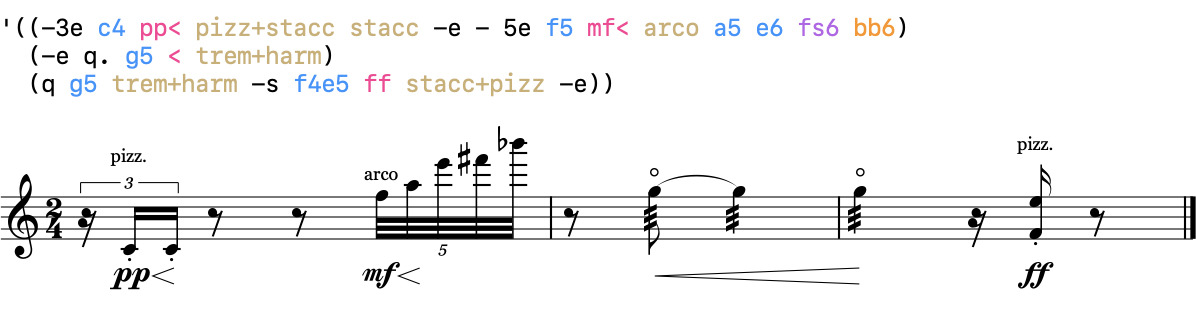
OMN Snippet

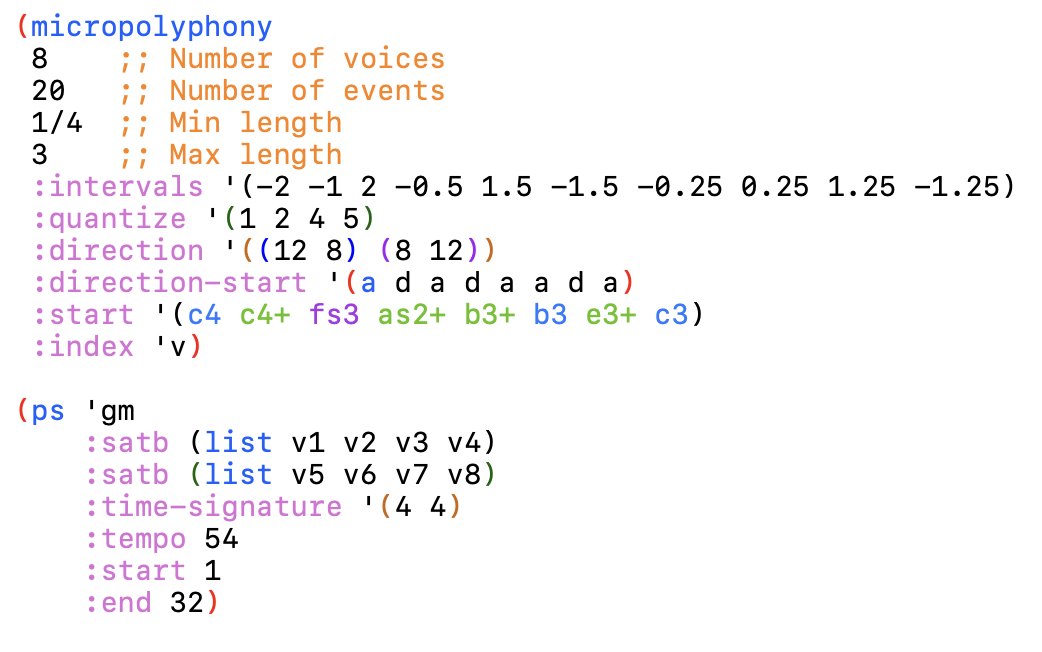
Score example - Micropolyphony

Opusmodus includes a suite of functions for data manipulation, pattern generation, and score construction, as well as a spectral analysis (Spectral music) tool that enables composers to extract and repurpose frequency content for advanced compositional processes. Its scripting interface (based on Common Lisp) supports user-defined processes, facilitating the creation of new compositional algorithms.

NCODE window is an interactive workspace in Opusmodus for exploring functions and building musical ideas step by step. User can adjust a function’s inputs using simple on-screen fields, save results as named variables you can reuse later, and assemble a complete score using the Def-Score pane. It is for anyone who wants to explore algorithmic composition in Opusmodus without writing Lisp code.

Opusmodus provides extensive microtonal capabilities by allowing composers to define pitch divisions well beyond the conventional twelve-tone equal temperament. This includes quarter-tone, eighth-tone, and arbitrary divisions of the octave, all integrated seamlessly into OMN (Opusmodus Notation) data. Scores using microtonality can be rendered in accurate notation or played back in real time, enabling detailed exploration of experimental pitch structures.

The software exports scores in industry-standard formats (e.g., MusicXML) and supports MIDI output, facilitating the transfer of musical ideas to traditional notation programs or virtual instruments. Opusmodus features its own notation system, called Opusmodus Notation (OMN), which represents musical elements like rhythm, pitch, dynamics, and articulations in a structured list format. The MusicXML import feature in Opusmodus enables users to bring compositions from standard notation software—including Finale, Sibelius, Dorico, and MuseScore directly into the environment. Imported files are automatically devoiced, separating each notated voice into its own instrument part for independent manipulation. This functionality facilitates detailed computational analysis and transformation, supporting research and creative work by providing algorithmic access to musical structures and parameters within Opusmodus.

A robust library of musical functions index helps generate and transform pitches, rhythms, articulation patterns, and harmonic structures, supporting both tonal and atonal techniques.

Users can introduce stochastic processes into their compositions. These methods are customisable and allow for a wide range of musical outcomes, from deterministic sequences to heavily randomised structures.

== Use cases ==
Opusmodus has been adopted by composers, academic researchers, and music technologists. Its applications include:

=== Academic research ===
Investigations into algorithmic composition, computational musicology, and artificial intelligence in the arts.

=== Experimental composition ===
Creation of electroacoustic and instrumental works through advanced generative processes.

=== Pedagogical purposes ===
Teaching algorithmic thinking in music conservatories and universities, where students learn to synthesise musical ideas through code.

== Universities using Opusmodus ==
- Mozarteum University Salzburg
- National University of Singapore
- University of Music and Performing Arts Vienna

== See also ==
- Algorithmic composition
- Computer music
- Generative music
- List of musical symbols
- LispWorks
- Musical analysis
