= BespokeSynth =

Modular synthesizer software

- Original author: Ryan Challinor
- Stable release: 1.3.0 / 2024-12-22
- Written in: C, C++
- Operating system: Mac, Windows, Linux
- License: GNU GPL v3
- Website: bespokesynth.com
- Repository: github.com/BespokeSynth/BespokeSynth/

BespokeSynth is a free and open-source software modular synthesizer and digital audio workstation.

== History ==
Development of the BespokeSynth software was started in 2011, when Ryan Challinor wanted to learn more about creating music, but didn't want to learn "the intricacies of an existing DAW". In 2016, Ryan Challinor released the source code on GitHub under the terms of the GNU General Public License.

On September 14, 2021, the version 1.0.0 was released with full documentation.

On November 16, 2021, the version 1.1.0 was released with several major changes. The changes include packaging Python with the software, significant simplification of the build process from source, new modules and effects.

On Jul 14, 2023, version 1.2.0 was released with several new modules, usability enhancements, OSC support and bug fixes.

On September 16, 2023, version 1.2.1 was released, which was primarily a bugfix release fixing 2 major issues with 1.2.0.

On December 22, 2024, version 1.3.0 was released, with several new modules, enhancements and many bug fixes.

A nightly build is available as well (updated every commit), with a lot of unreleased features and fixes. As this is a development release, it can also have some potential instability, but is generally stable.

== Overview ==
Example of one module connecting to another in the BespokeSynth software

BespokeSynth lets the user build their own layout from scratch, so each user has a unique interface. It consists of over 190 modules which can be interconnected.

BespokeSynth has the following features:

- Modular synthesis
- Non-linear arrangement
- Live looping
- Live jams
- Livecoding in Python
- Plug-in hosting (for VST)
- MIDI and Open Sound Control controller support

Python is packaged with the software, so there is no need to install it separately.
