= Clickradio =

Clickradio was an internet startup whose flagship product was a radio program that sought to deliver uninterrupted and high quality music. Clickradio downloaded songs to the computer's hard drive, because high-quality audio streaming was not available at the time. Since the songs were downloaded to disk, users could listen while not connected to the Internet.

== Service Offerings ==
Clickradio allowed users to rate songs and essentially create their own personalized radio station. Users had the ability to vote on the songs they heard. Choosing a "thumbs-up" would indicate they would hear the song more, and choosing "thumbs-down" meant they heard it less. Users also had the option to "skip it" in case they didn't want to listen to a particular song. Since it was free, five minutes of advertisements were set to occur for every hour of play time.

Users also could get information about the songs and artists that were currently playing, and even had the ability to purchase the album.

The music was encoded with the ePAC encoder from Lucent Technologies. Since it was directly downloaded to the user's PC, the music was encrypted to help protect it against Internet piracy.

== Company history ==
In April 2000, the company received special attention from its deals made with Universal Music Group, as well as BMG Entertainment. In August 2000 they also signed with Warner Music Group. All of the (at the time) "big 5" music companies signed licensing deals with ClickRadio. The goal of Clickradio was to avoid any legal issues by signing with popular labels for their music.

The service launched in May 2000. The New York City company ceased operations in October 2001, having survived the Internet "bubble," but succumbing to the investment downturn in NYC that followed the September 11 attacks.

Clickradio was planning to switch to a subscription format instead of their previous free offering, and was planning a large relaunch of their site. That never happened, and the domain clickradio.com no longer exists.
