= Melodic learning =

Multimodal learning method

Melodic Learning is a multimodal learning method that uses the defining elements of singing (pitch, rhythm and rhyme) to facilitate the capture, storage and retrieval of information. Widely recognized examples of Melodic Learning include using the alphabet song to learn the alphabet and "This Old Man" to learn counting.

== Overview ==
In 2004, Dr. Susan Homan, Dr. Robert Dedrick and then doctoral student, Marie C. Biggs of the University of South Florida's College of Education began researching the use of a non-standard approach to reading remediation that used repeated singing of grade leveled songs with struggling, middle school readers. When the results of their pilot study as well as further research over the following five years consistently showed significant gains, Dr. Homan, et al. began searching the literature for an explanation as to why this non-traditional approach was effective.

After reviewing recent findings in the fields of literacy, neuroscience and anthropology, Dr. Homan, in collaboration with Dr. Eliot Levinson, identified this use of repeated singing to accelerate learning as a form of, "Melodic Learning". Dr. Homan posits that other forms of Melodic Learning include the singing of hymns in organized religions and the use of oral tradition to pass on important information from generation to generation in pre-literate societies

== Multi-media Learning Theory ==
Melodic learning combines melody with visual imagery to enhance learning. Melodic learning is an extension of Multimedia Learning Theory because it focuses specifically on the addition of music to learning. Research indicates that multiple types of media have positive effects on a learner however, multimedia learning can encompass as few as two senses whereas melodic learning explores how music embeds learning deeper into the human brain.

The neuroscience about how music affects learning is a relatively new area of research. Music is a part of every known culture including in the very distant past. Dr. Patel's research links music to linguistics, to early learning, to language learning, and to literacy learning.

Music engages all of the following brain functions:

- Emotion
- Memory
- Learning and Plasticity
- Attention
- Motor control
- Pattern perception
- Imagery

== Multiple Modalities ==
Learning with Sesame Street on the television is an example of melodic learning. Through Sesame Street, young children experience and advance emergent literacy processes through poems, jingles, chants, word games and singing songs. Several of the principles of literacy learning interact. Rhyming and singing are high-level multi-modal interactions of visual, auditory/aural, and kinesthetic modalities. Rhythmic and tonal processing also contribute to the success of this learning process.

Jumping rope is an example of melodic learning. Tonal, rhythmic, aural and visual elements interplay as children sing and rhyme. The rope's motion supplies the kinesthetic element to enhance the process. This may explain why many children learn jump rope rhymes faster and retain them longer than they do for many of their classroom lessons.

A combination of five specific modalities or Learning styles affect how a child learns while playing or while watching Sesame Street or jumping rope:

- Aural – The child says, hears and processes audio content as he listens to Grover singing a song on Sesame Street.
- Visual – The child sees and processes the images of Grover and what he is singing about.
- Kinesthetic learning – The child is animated, possibly singing, while processing the audio and visual content from Grover's song.
- Rhythmic – As the melody and accompaniment to the song are played, the child feels both the rhythm of the song and the rhythm of the language. This feeling of the rhythm can lead to kinesthetic involvement.
- Tonal – The child feels the beat of the music (rhythm) and is often moved to sing along. Singing encourages the child to modulate her tone as she tries to follow the tune of the melody. Tone or pitch helps transmit the meaning.

The integration of these modalities creates more powerful and permanent measurable learning outcomes and can accelerate learning, especially for struggling learners.

== Neuroscience evidence ==
Melodic learning appears to derive its effectiveness from the special nature of music and singing's activity pattern in the human brain. A series of books published in the 2000s by noted neuroscientists document the unique relationship between music and our brains, including Musicophilia by Oliver Sacks, This Is Your Brain On Music by Daniel Levitin, and Music, Language, and the Brain by Aniruddh D. Patel.

== History ==
An earworm is a portion of a song that repeats itself inside one's head. As recently as 2005, researchers discovered that the earworm is engraved in the auditory cortex and instantly retrieved. Industrial psychologists have made good use of this link between music and learning by creating catchy jingles to sell products. More recently earworms are being used in training products.

Nearly every civilization uses music to share information. Australia's aboriginal tribesmen used songs to detail complex routes to important places. Although this was not a feat of memory alone and that rock art serve as tangible manuscripts for these musicians. In Africa, drums were used to communicate. Throughout Europe roving minstrels and troubadours sang ballads retelling the news and politics of the day. In churches, temples and mosques, chanted prayers etch religious words into memory. The connection between music and learning runs deep inside the brain. The patterns reinforce each other resulting in a greater learning effect.

Adults and children can recognize a wrong note in a simple melody. If one note of the simple five-note opening to The Star-Spangled Banner is played incorrectly, those who've heard the song before can instantly recognize that it is wrong. Westerners recognize standard chord progressions that are "wrong" even though they have never heard them before. Researchers link the phenomena of identifying the wrong note and identifying the wrong word (syntactically) to the same part of the brain, thereby demonstrating how music and words are intertwined.

== See also ==
- Learning styles
- Lukas Foss
- Theory of multiple intelligences
