= TagLib =

Software library for reading and editing audio metadata

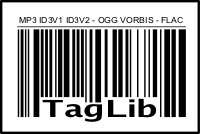
- Original author(s): Scott Wheeler
- Stable release: 2.0.2 / 24 August 2024; 7 months ago
- Repository: github.com/TagLib/TagLib
- Written in: C++
- License: LGPL, MPL
- Website: taglib.org

TagLib is a free library for reading and editing metadata embedded into audio files.

It is capable of reading and editing all relevant metadata formats for audio files, including APEv2, ID3 and Vorbis comment. It can find tags in a number of different formats (.mp3, .ogg, .spx, .mpc, .ape, .flac, .wv, .tta, .wma, .m4a/m4b/m4p/mp4/3g2, .wav, .aif[f], .opus (since version 1.9)). Unicode is supported. Language bindings exist for the programming languages C (minimal), Perl, Python, and Ruby.

TagLib is developed in C++ and has no runtime dependencies on other software.

The library is distributed as Free Software under the terms of either the GNU Lesser General Public License (LGPL) or the Mozilla Public License (MPL). It is platform independent and officially supports several Unix-like operating systems (such as Linux and OS X), and Windows. Installation on popular Linux distributions is possible using the default package sources, and even pre-installed in popular desktop systems.
TagLib is the base for the "Tagging" capability for a number of media players, including Amarok and VLC media player, however, it is used by the last.fm or the file manager GNOME Commander as well.

Development began in 2002 and version 1.0 was released on January 22, 2004.

== Bibliography ==
- Negus, Christopher (2008). Linux Bible 2008 Edition. John Wiley & Sons. p. 777. ISBN 978-0-470-23019-0.
- Ezust, Alan & Paul (2012). An Introduction to Design Patterns in C++ with Qt, 2nd Edition. Prentice Hall. p. 499. ISBN 978-0-13-282645-7.
