= Monome =

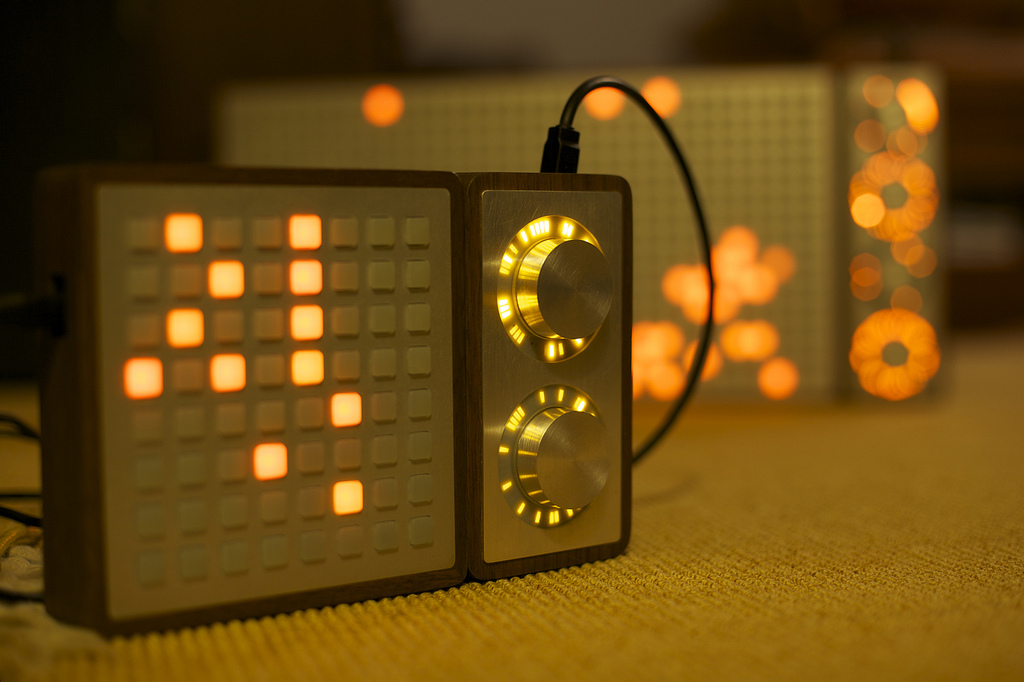
Monome 64 and arc2 (foreground), Monome 512 and arc4 (background).

Monome is an Upstate New York-based company, founded by Brian Crabtree and Kelli Cain, that produces sound modules and MIDI controllers. Monome is also the name of their initial product, a grid-based controller that is now sometimes simply referred to as grid.

== Design ==
The Monome has a minimalist design, and has been complimented for its interface design. It is a box with a grid of back-lit buttons, with no labels or icons.

== Functionality ==
A core design principle of the Monome is that it is not intended for any one specific application — the function of each button and the decision as to which lights are lit are completely up to the software communicating with the device over the Open Sound Control protocol. The creators of Monome said: "The wonderful thing about this device is that is doesn't do anything really... It wasn't intended for any specific application. We'll make several applications, and others will make more. We hope to share as many of these as possible."

== Models ==
Since 2006, several models have been produced, with typical sizes ranging from 64 to 256 buttons — plus a very limited run of 512-button devices.

In 2011, the first non-grid controller in the Monome family was introduced, the Monome Arc. The Monome Arc consists of two aluminum knobs mounted on a rectangular walnut box. Each knob is surrounded by a ring of 64 LED lights, and similarly to the Monome, affords function only by USB connection to an application.

In September 2013, Monome introduced another open-sourced music device, the music computer called Aleph. Aleph contains four digital inputs and outputs, four control voltage inputs and outputs, multiple optical encoders, a display screen and USB - all of which can be completely reprogrammed at the software level. Full release and distribution was planned for late Fall 2013.

== See also ==
- Controllerism
- Music technology
- List of open source hardware projects
- List of music software
