= Jamstix =

Instrument kit

- Developer(s): Rayzoon Technologies
- Stable release: 4.3.1 (Windows, Mac) / March 18, 2019
- Operating system: Microsoft Windows, Mac OS X
- Type: Softsynth
- Licence: Proprietary
- Website: www.rayzoon.com/jamstix3

Jamstix is a VST instrument kit produced by Rayzoon Technologies.

== Description ==
Jamstix is a VST virtual instrument kit. The program features an audio arranger, an online drum kit and a rhythm generator, which can all be used to create music.

== See also ==
- Virtual Studio Technology
- Softsynth
