= MediaCoder =

Transcoding program

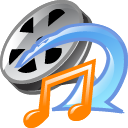
- Original author: Stanley Huang
- Developer: Broad Intelligence Technologies
- Preview release: 0.8.58 / 1 July 2019; 6 years ago
- Operating system: Windows
- Platform: x64
- Type: Transcoding
- License: Ad-supported freemium
- Website: www.mediacoderhq.com

MediaCoder is a proprietary transcoding program for Microsoft Windows, developed by Stanley Huang since 2005.

== Features ==
MediaCoder uses various open-source (and several proprietary) audio and video codecs to transcode media files to different audio/video formats. Common uses for the program include compression, file type conversion, remuxing and extraction of audio from video files. Many formats are supported, including MP3, Vorbis, Advanced Audio Coding (AAC), Windows Media Audio (WMA), RealAudio, WAV, and others. The program uses a wizard to create files, but that can also be adjusted manually by the drag-and-drop function.

MediaCoder supports NVIDIA NVENC and Intel QSV.

== Reception ==
MediaCoder was a nominee of SourceForge.NET 2007 Community Choice Award of Best Project for Multimedia along with Audacity, InkScape and FFDShow.

== Distribution ==
Prior to 2008, MediaCoder was a free and open-source software application and was available on SourceForge. In December 2009, Stanley Huang announced that the project is no longer hosted on SourceForge and no longer open-source.
