= SoundTracker (Unix) =

Music tracker

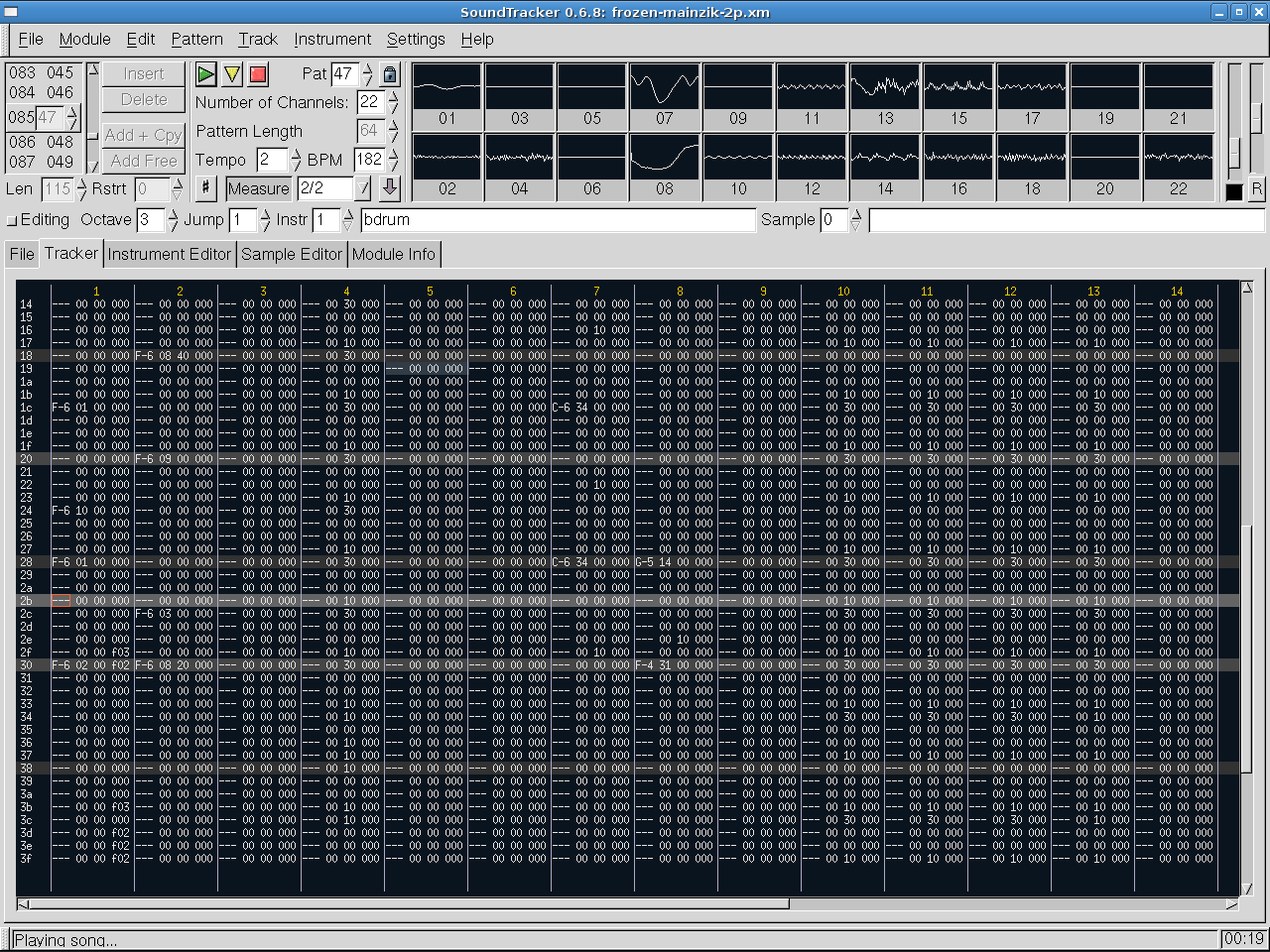
- Version 0.6.8 screenshot
- Original author: Michael Krause
- Stable release: 1.0.5 / March 17, 2024; 2 years ago
- Written in: C
- Operating system: X11/Unix
- Type: Tracker
- License: GPL-2.0-or-later
- Website: www.soundtracker.org
- Repository: sourceforge.net/p/soundtracker/git/ci/master/tree/

SoundTracker is a free music tracker for Unix-like operating systems running the X Window System, used for composing music saved in module files.

== Description ==
Its name is a tribute to the 1987 Amiga program Ultimate Soundtracker which is regarded as the first program of this type, while its user interface mostly resembles and indeed functionally mimics Fast Tracker, one of many popular MS-DOS-based audio trackers, supporting saving in its file formats. It generally renders playback using the OpenCP (à la Cubic Player) engine. Initially SoundTracker had used GTK+ (version 1) as its widget toolkit, modern versions (since 1.0.0) use GTK+ 2. For many years, SoundTracker was one of the very few mature audio trackers available for Unix-like operating systems.
