= GP4 =

GP4, GP-4, GP.4, or variant, may refer to:

- Grand Prix 4, 2002 Formula 1 video game
- Osprey Aircraft GP-4, airplane
- González Gil-Pazó GP-4, airplane
- 1989 GP4 or 7933 Magritte
- .gp4, TuxGuitar file format
- .gp4, Guitar Pro file format
