= Mosaic notation program =

Scorewriter

Mosaic (also called Composer's Mosaic) was a Macintosh scorewriter application for producing music notation, developed by Mark of the Unicorn.

First released as Professional Composer among early Macintosh software in 1984, the application introduced a user interface similar to the word processor. The main features included entering musical notation, printing sheet music, and support for lyrics under the score with the font of choice. Notes could be selected from the user interface or entered from the keyboard. The user could also change or extend the tempo, key signature, meter, and other parameters.

The next major release, Professional Composer 2.0, supported writing on up to 40 staves and allowed the user to enter notes as short as 128th notes, with all operations mainly controlled by menus and dialog boxes. Version 2.0 also introduced several improvements for printing (such as automatically condensing parts with several rest measures), allowing production of professional quality scores. Although the application demanded knowledge of music theory to use its rich features, it offered only rudimentary playback capabilities. A Macworld review also criticized the high price (US$495 in February 1986) and the lack of automatic scrolling when staves were filled (only via scroll bars).

Version 2.2 (1988) corrected several bugs and improved compatibility with Mac Plus, SE and II. Version 2.3M was the last release of Professional Composer.

Mosaic entered the market in 1992 as the successor to Professional Composer. An early user review of version 1.01 criticized stability issues and problems with file importing from other applications. In version 1.58 released in 1998, the notation software removed all limits on page size, score length, number of staves, and number of voices per staff. Configuration options in different windows created a flexible but sometimes confusing user interface. Drag and drop features and ability to convert MIDI files into usable notation were counted among the strongest points of Mosaic.

After 1998, no new versions of Mosaic were released by MOTU, and therefore was not compatible with MacOS 10. Competing notation packages are Sibelius, Finale, and Dorico, however no direct conversion of file formats, such as via MusicXML, is possible. Mosaic users now have to rely on creating PDF files of Mosaic output under MacOS 9 and then having these read by OCR programs such as PDFtoMusic and PhotoScore by Neuratron.
