= ASCII tab =

Musical notation file format

ASCII tab is a text file format used for writing guitar, bass guitar and drum tabulatures (a form of musical notation) that uses plain ASCII numbers, letters and symbols. It is the only widespread file format for representing tabulature, and is extensively used for disseminating tabulature via the Internet.

ASCII tab is intended to be a human-readable format rather than machine-readable, and hence is not strictly defined. Though some standards are used by all ASCII tab files, such as hyphens to represent string lines and digits to represent frets, other things such as barlines, rhythms, bends, chord symbols etc. may be present, absent or represented in a variety of ways. Additionally, ASCII tab files frequently contain lyrics and freeform text in unpredictable places.

There are various computer programs for creating guitar tabulature which can save ASCII tab files, but due to the unpredictability of the format, only a few (e.g. G7) can read arbitrary ASCII tab files created by humans.

ASCII tab files usually have the file extension .tab, .btab (for bass guitar) or .txt.

The tabulature for a C major chord on six-string guitar with standard tuning typically looks something like this:

        C
e |-----0------|
B |-----1------|
G |-----0------|
D |-----2------|
A |-----3------|
E |------------|

The string tunings at the left-hand side are often omitted. When notating entire songs, usually a note near the beginning of the tabulature tells the reader what tuning the instrument should be in. The number on each line refers to the fret as in guitar tab. Sometimes an 'x' means that the string should be played, but muted with either the left-hand fingers or the right-hand palm. The chord symbol C is written above - again this may or may not be included.

Other techniques, such as hammer-ons, string pulls (or pull-offs), slides, and bends may also be shown. Hammer-ons are usually shown with an "h" in between the fret to strike and the fret to hammer on. String pulls are shown with a "p". "Tribute" by Tenacious D is one example of a song that uses both of these:

    Am (A minor)
e |-------------0-0-0-0-0-0-----0-------0-0-0-0-0-|
B |-------------1-1-1-1-1-1-1h3p1p0h1---1-1-1-1-1-|
G |-----0h2-----2-2-2-2-2-2-----2-------2-2-2-2-2-|
D |-0h2-------2-2-2-2-2-2-2-----2-----2-2-2-2-2-2-|
A |---------0---0-0-0-0-0-----------0---0-0-0-0-0-|
E |-----------------------------------------------|

A trill is a combination of hammer-ons and pull-offs being performed in succession.

Slides are shown in the same format, but with a slash (/) or the letter S in between the fret to slide from and the fret to slide to. "ATWA" by System of a Down is a song that uses these (in Drop D tuning):

e |----------------------------------------------------|
B |----------------------------------------------------|
G |----3-----2-----5-----7------8------7-----5-----3---|
D |----------------------------------------------------|
A |----------------------------------------------------|
D |--5---5/3---3/7---7/8---8/10---10/8---8/7---7/5---5-|

Bending is often shown by a letter b, but may also be indicated by an ^. A bend can show how far the string is to be bent, when the string is to be released (denoted by an r), or that it is a bend to an unspecific note. Examples:

e |---------------------------------------|
B |---------------------------------------|
G |--5b7--------5b7r5--------5b--------5br|
D |---------------------------------------|
A |---------------------------------------|
E |---------------------------------------|

In the first example, a note played at the fifth fret on the G string (the note C) is bent up one full step so that it sounds like a note played at the seventh fret on the G string (the note D); secondly, the same note is played, but the bend is released so that the string again sounds a C note; thirdly, the string is bent to an undetermined note; fourthly, the string is bent to an undetermined note, and released back to the C note.

ASCII tab can also indicate rhythms above the staff; however this is rarely done. Barlines can be indicated using '|' characters (pipes). Lyrics may be added above or below the staff, either aligned with the music or as a continuous text block. Freeform text (describing the song, composer, transcriber, notational conventions used, etc.) is also often included at the start or end of the file, or used for relevant comments about a certain part of the song.

ASCII tab can also use various lines, arrows, and other symbols to denote bends, hammer-ons, trills, pull-offs, slides, and so on. These are the symbols that represent various techniques, though these may vary:

Symbol	Technique
h	hammer on
p	pull off
b	bend string up
r	release bend
/	slide up
\	slide down
v	vibrato (sometimes written as ~)
t	right hand tap
s	legato slide
S	shift slide
*	natural harmonic
[n]	artificial harmonic
n(n)	tapped harmonic
tr	trill
T	tap
TP	tremolo picking
PM	palm muting (also written as _)
\n/	tremolo arm dip; n = amount to dip
\n	tremolo arm down
n/	tremolo arm up
/n\	tremolo arm inverted dip
=	hold bend; also acts as connecting device for hammers/pulls
<>	volume swell (louder/softer)
x	on rhythm slash represents muted slash
o	on rhythm slash represents single note slash
·/.	pick slide
