= TuxGuitar =

Music notation software

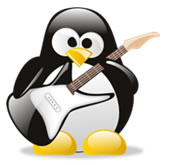

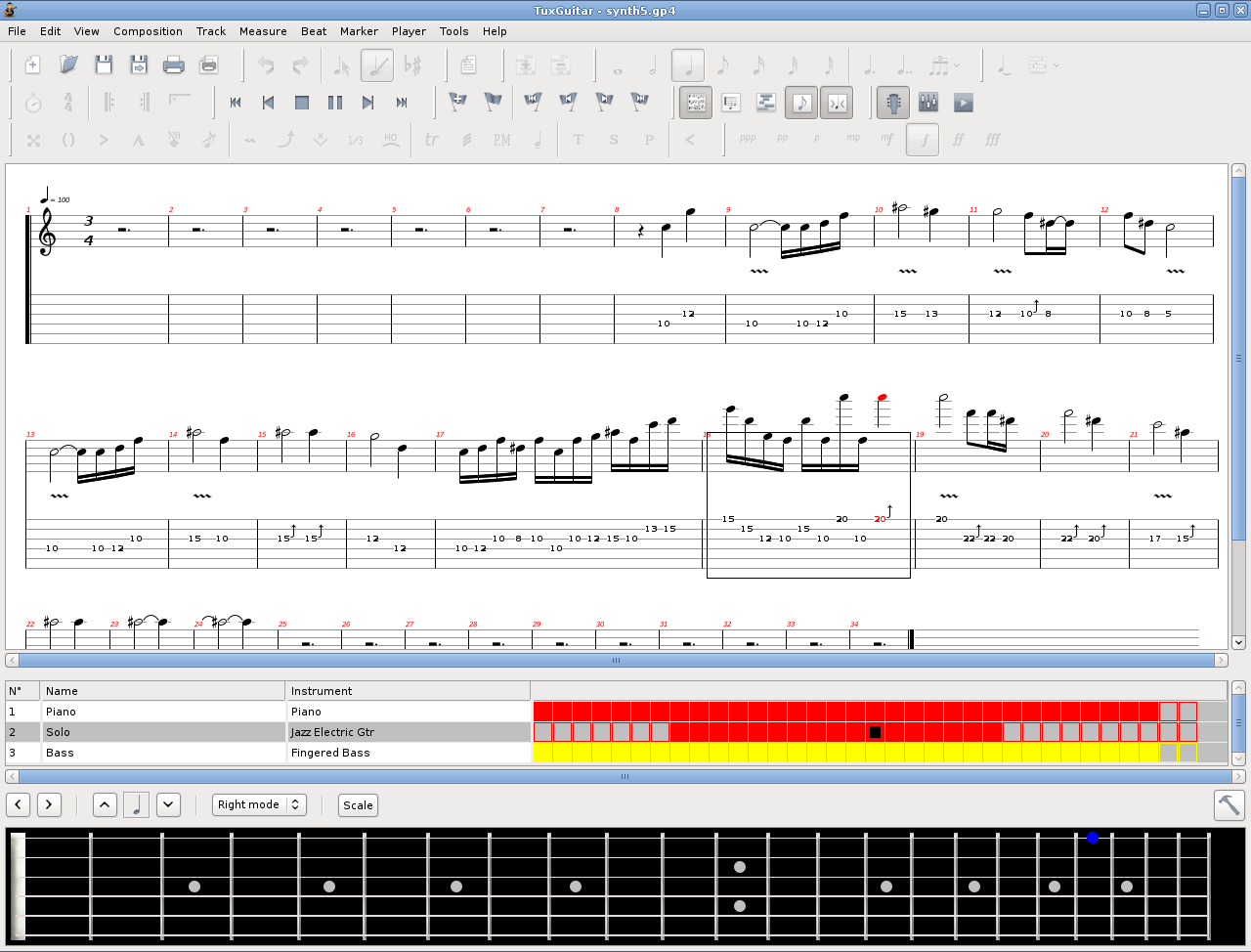
- Original authors: Julian Gabriel Casadesus and others
- Stable release: 2.0.1 / 27 December 2025
- Repository: github.com/helge17/tuxguitar
- Written in: Java, Standard Widget Toolkit (SWT)
- Operating system: Linux, Microsoft Windows, macOS, FreeBSD
- Available in: English, French, German, Italian, Polish, Russian, Spanish
- Type: Tablature editor, Scorewriter
- License: LGPL-2.1-only
- Website: www.tuxguitar.app

TuxGuitar is a free and open-source tablature editor, which includes features such as tablature editing, score editing, and import and export of Guitar Pro gp3, gp4, and gp5 files. In addition, TuxGuitar's tablature and staff interfaces function as basic MIDI editors.

TuxGuitar's mascot and namesake is Tux, the penguin mascot of many games and programs originally designed for Linux.

The program is written in the Java programming language and is released under the LGPL-2.1-only license.

Originally developed on SourceForge, development moved to GitHub on 30 March 2023 after the TuxGuitar websites had disappeared and the original author stopped responding. The 1.6.0 release was the first release done on GitHub.

== Skins ==
TuxGuitar offers a set of three default skins that its users can choose from. These are:

| Image | Name | Author | First appeared in | Description |
|---|---|---|---|---|
| a grey and greyish blue layout for TuxGuitar | Lavender | Sascha | v0.1 | Simple, elegant theme with lavender color. |
| | Blue serious | Licnep | v0.1 | A more serious theme, where blue dominates. |
| A red-brown layout for TuxGuitar that is very rural in appearance due to the choice of colors ranging from red to shades of blue and green. | Ersplus | Ersplus | v0.9 | Default TuxGuitar theme. |

TuxGuitar also supports custom skins. The default skin for version 1.0 is Lavender.

== Supported effects ==
Note effects
| Dead notes | Supported. |
| Accentuated notes | Only heavy or regular. |
| Harmonics | Only natural, artificial, tapped, pinched, or semi harmonic. |
| Dynamics | Not displayed in the body of the score. |
| Grace notes | Limited to a duration ranging from 1/64 to 1/16 of a whole note. |
| Tremolo picking | Limited to a duration of at most 1/8 and at least 1/32 of a whole note. |
| Slurs | Supported in the form of hammer-ons/pull-offs. |
| Hammer-ons and pull-offs | Limited support (the program doesn't differentiate between the two). |
| Slides | Limited support. |
Track effects
| Multiple Tracks | Supported, can be displayed by clicking View > Multitrack. |
| Multiple Voices | Supported but limited to two voices per track. |
| Repeats | Supported but limited to either open or closed barline repeats. |
| Alter. Endings | Supported but MIDI playback will only recognize the first two alternative endings, the second of which must be located above the measure that directly follows the closed repeat in order for it to be associated with the first alternative ending and the repeat in question. |
| Custom Number of Tunings for a Track's strings | Supported but the number of strings that can be added is limited to no more than 7 and no less than 4 and they can be set to any pitch within the range of 16.352Hz and 15804.266Hz, inclusive. Does not currently allow for different-length courses, e.g. five-string banjo. |
| Track Names | Supported. |
| Lyrics | Supported. |
| Text | Supported. |
| Chords | Supported. |
| Symbols | Supported but limited to time signatures, clefs, and key signatures. (Instructional performance text can be added instead of symbols via the Text editor but they will not be supported by the MIDI playback or be recognized by TuxGuitar as anything but text.) |

== Supported file formats ==
| File format | Importing | Exporting |
|---|---|---|
| TuxGuitar (.tg) | Yes | Yes |
| Guitar Pro (.gtp) | Yes | No |
| Guitar Pro 3 (.gp3) | Yes | Yes |
| Guitar Pro 4 (.gp4) | Yes | Yes |
| Guitar Pro 5 (.gp5) | Yes | Yes |
| Guitar Pro 6 (.gpx) | Yes | No |
| Guitar Pro 7 (.gp) | Yes | No |
| Power Tab (.ptb) | Yes | No |
| TablEdit (.tef) | Yes | No |
| GNU LilyPond (.ly) | No | Yes |
| MIDI (.mid) | Yes | Yes |
| ASCII tab (.txt) | No | Yes |

== Reception ==
As of May 2014, TuxGuitar had 4/5 stars in the CNET user ratings. During the same time, TuxGuitar had 3.4/5 stars in the Softpedia user ratings. As of August 2016 the program has 4.7/5 stars on SourceForge. Reviewers at Software Informer gave version 1.0 of TuxGuitar 5/5 stars, praising the "very easy to use interface" and "very advanced functions" of the program.

== See also ==
- List of music software
