= Music writer =

Music writer may refer to:

- A Composer
- A Songwriter
- A Lyricist
- A Music copyist (a specialized calligrapher)
- A Music critic
- A writer who deals with music
