= Manuscript paper =

Paper preprinted with musical staves

Grand staff. Some manuscript paper is pre-printed with notational elements such as system brackets, braces, clefs, bar lines, and instrumental designations.

Manuscript paper (sometimes staff paper in U.S. English, or just music paper) is paper preprinted with staves ready for musical notation. A manuscript is made up of lines and spaces, and these lines and space have their names depending on the staves (bass or treble). Manuscript paper is also available for drum notation and guitar tabulature.

== See also ==
- Rastrum
- Sheet music

== Works cited ==
- “Staff Paper”. All About Music Theory. 10 Oct. 2014. Accessed 3 Apr. 2020.
- Sainsbury, Christopher. “Bi-tone Techniques and Notation in Contemporary Guitar Music Composition”. Master’s thesis, NSW Conservatorium of Music, 2001-2002.
