= On-line Guitar Archive =

Internet library of guitar and bass tablature

The On-line Guitar Archive (OLGA) was the first Internet library of plain-text chords charts and tablatures (or "tabs") for guitar and bass. As a non-commercial repository of thousands of files, it was a popular resource for musicians of all genres for over a decade, from 1992 to 2006.

== History ==
In the early 1990s, musicians used newsgroups such as rec.music.makers.guitar.tablature and alt.guitar.tab to share plain-text tabs they had written, or to request tabs of certain songs or artists. However, the availability of tabs was limited, because Usenet retention time meant that older content was regularly deleted from newsgroup servers in order to make room for newer content. Consequently, tabs were sometimes only available for a couple of days.

Around 1992, UNLV student James Bender started collecting newsgroup posts and making them available free of charge on the university's FTP server under the name of On-line Guitar Archive (OLGA). Third-party websites, such as db.guitar.net/tab then guitar.net/olga, provided web-based search forms for the archive. "Mirror sites" provided a regularly-updated duplicate of the central OLGA archive.

In June 1994, TU student Cathal Woods took over the archive as "chief curator", moving it to its definitive URL, www.OLGA.net. By 1997, it was estimated that the OLGA database had expanded to 22,000 files, with its contents duplicated in more than 20 mirrors.

The archive's growing popularity brought the attention of the music industry, and following several legal complaints over the years, OLGA.net was forced to cease operations in 2006.

== Legal complaints ==
In 1996, EMI Publishing filed a complaint with UNLV, claiming that the archive was in breach of copyright law with songs they had the rights to. Although OLGA was never threatened directly, UNLV kicked the project off its server. Then in 1998, after a new home for the site was found, OLGA received a similar copyright complaint from the Harry Fox Agency (HFA). As a result, OLGA was forced to shut down, re-emerging later as OLGA incorporated, a registered non-profit organization dedicated to preserving the archive and providing for its bandwidth. The site prior to this final move was preserved as "the old archive," and contributions since the move were stored in "the new archive".

In June 2006 they received a take down letter from lawyers representing the NMPA and the MPA, although by this time temporary clones of the archive had started to appear on sites such as Renegade Olga.

In 2006, the Archive removed all 34,000 tablatures on the site. A note posted on the site indicated that those running the site had received "a 'take down' letter from lawyers representing the National Music Publishers Association and the Music Publishers Association", according to the linked letter on the front page. In the letter it is stated that OLGA "makes available tablature versions of copyrighted musical compositions owned or controlled by members of the NMPA and MPA"

Although originally a notice on the site suggested that the shutdown would only be temporary while OLGA attempted to resolve legal issues, the long time archivist for the site has indicated on his personal website that the situation is permanent: "For twelve years I ran OLGA - the On-Line Guitar Archive. RIP."

== See also ==
- Guitar
- Sheet music
- Music notation
