= Navalia =

Navalia is a town (polis or oppidum) that was mentioned by Claudius Ptolemaeus in his Geographia. The town has recently been associated with Essen. The name translates from Latin as "dock" or "wharf", but this may be coincidental.

Though Ptolemy provides coordinates, it is unknown which prime meridian he used. Moreover the coordinates provided have been polluted by mistakes by copyists. The exact locations of the places mentioned remained unsure until recently.
