= NotePerformer =

Virtual instrument for notation playback

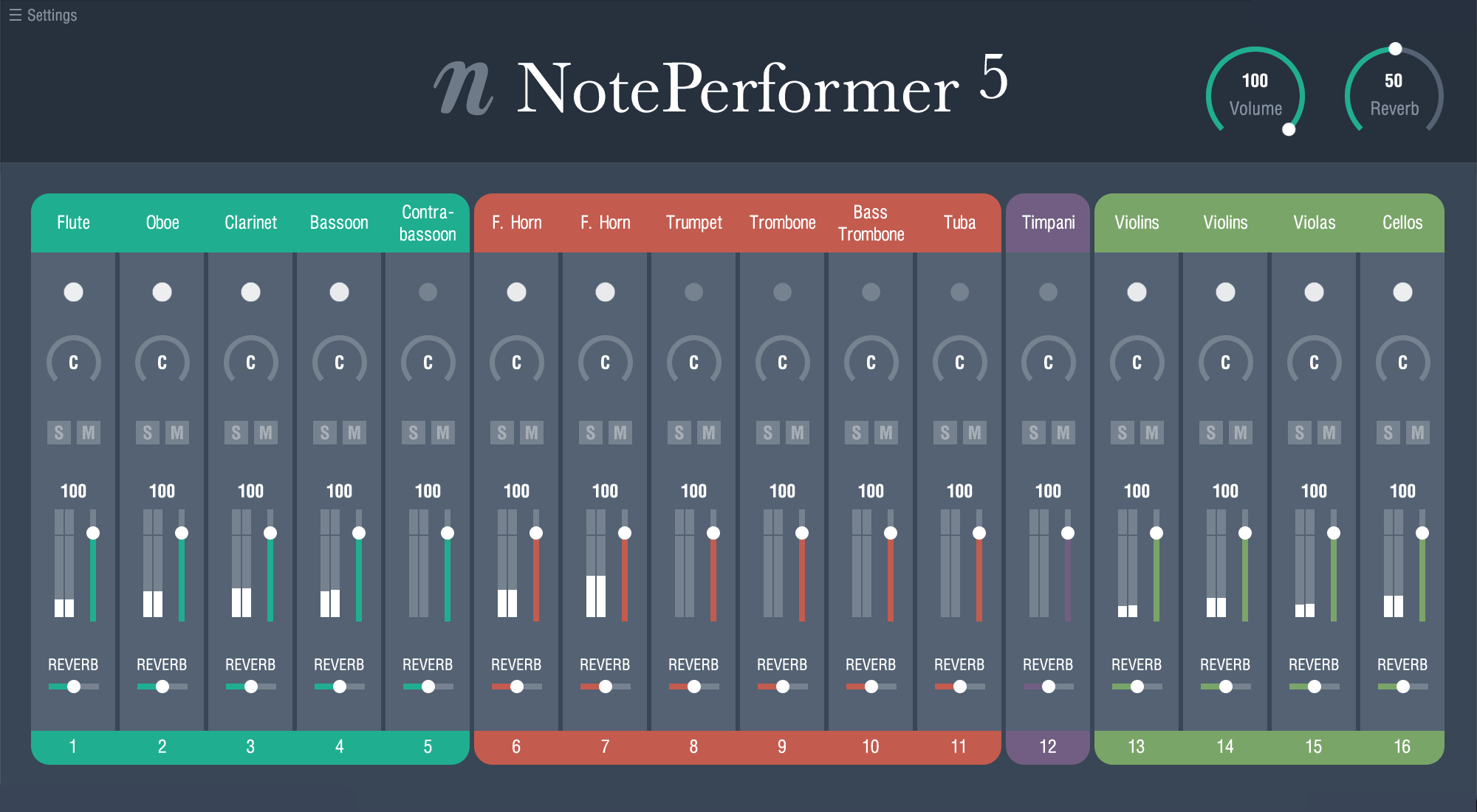
- NotePerformer mixer interface in Dorico
- Original author: Arne Wallander
- Developer: Wallander Instruments (Sweden)
- Initial release: 2013
- Stable release: 5.1.2 / January 2026
- Operating system: macOS, Microsoft Windows
- Type: Software synthesizer, music notation
- License: Proprietary software
- Website: https://www.noteperformer.com

NotePerformer is a software synthesizer developed by Wallander Instruments. It integrates with select scorewriters and provides dynamic orchestral playback through automated interpretation of written dynamics, phrasing, and articulation. The software is compatible with the notation platforms Sibelius, Dorico, and the now discontinued Finale.

== History ==
NotePerformer was first released in September 2013 as a sound module only for Sibelius, aiming to provide more realistic phrasing and expression during score playback than the default sounds. A distinguishing feature at launch was its ability to read ahead by one second in the score, enabling dynamically phrased playback.

In May 2018, version 3.0 expanded compatibility to include Dorico and Finale.

According to Wallander Instruments, as of 2025, NotePerformer is used by over 45,000 musicians in more than 120 countries.

== Reception ==
NotePerformer has been the subject of coverage in music education, music technology, and academic publications.

A 2015 article in the Computer Music Journal described NotePerformer as a sound library designed to create more realistic-sounding scores with human-like automatic phrasing and expression. It highlighted the software's ability to read ahead during playback, analyze the score, and automatically apply the appropriate expression to each phrase without the need for tweaking by the user. The review also noted its broad instrument selection, low memory requirements, and seamless integration with Sibelius.

The book Technology Tips for Ensemble Teachers described NotePerformer as a sound library for Sibelius, Dorico, and Finale with the ability to read, interpret, and perform expressive markings from the score, allowing for a more realistic and expressive performance. It also highlighted NotePerformer's use of additive synthesis technology and how it made the software quicker to load and requiring less storage space.

The book The Future of Music described NotePerformer as an integrated sound library for notation software that improves playback by analyzing musical markings with a one-second delay. The authors highlighted features such as simulated string section sizes, harmonics, mutes, dynamic timbre changes in brass, and bowed percussion. While acknowledging that higher realism can be achieved by recording individual parts into a DAW using sample libraries, they recognized NotePerformer as offering a faster and more convenient workflow.

In a Music Teacher magazine review, Tony Cliff praised it and said it “transformed Sibelius” and was “educationally valuable” because improved articulation led to better playback, encouraging good scoring practices. MusicTech (2014) gave it 8/10, highlighting realistic phrasing and demo usability, but noted weaknesses in solo strings and jazz playback.

Composer Mark Isaacs credited NotePerformer with enabling the virtual premiere of his Symphony No. 2 during the COVID-19 pandemic, while acknowledging it was not a substitute for live performance.

The Musician categorized NotePerformer as an “AI tool that aids live performance.” However, the software predates modern AI developments and, according to its developer, relies solely on symbolic artificial intelligence—a traditional, rule-based system for interpreting music notation—rather than the generative or machine learning-based methods more commonly associated with contemporary AI.

=== Use in education ===
Berklee College of Music lists NotePerformer as required software for undergraduate composition majors and for graduate students in the Scoring for Film, Television, and Video Games program at Berklee Valencia.

The Peabody Institute of Johns Hopkins University specifies that portfolio recordings for certain composition programs, including Film and Game Scoring, must be either live performances or rendered using NotePerformer or an equivalent tool.

== Features ==
NotePerformer interprets score markings such as dynamics, articulations, and slurs to produce expressive playback without user programming. A distinctive feature is its ability to "look ahead" by one second during playback, allowing phrasing to be rendered more naturally.

The software includes over 150 instruments, and uses a combination of synthesis and a patented sample dynamics technology to produce dynamically expressive sounds with low resource usage.

== NotePerformer Playback Engines (discontinued) ==
In May 2023, version 4 introduced the NotePerformer Playback Engines (NPPE), a system that allowed routing of playback to select third-party VST sample libraries such as Vienna Symphonic Library, Spitfire Audio, and EastWest.

Version 5.0, released in May 2025, expanded the system to support virtually any VST3 instrument. However, shortly after release, Wallander Instruments discontinued NPPE in version 5.0.1, citing licensing concerns.

== Version history ==
Version	Release date	Notable changes	Ref
1.0	September 2, 2013	Initial release for Sibelius	
1.1	September 16, 2013	Reduced input latency	
1.1.3	September 25, 2013	Sound improvements	
1.2.1	December 16, 2013	Timing improvements, optimizations	
1.3	April 8, 2014	Added choirs	
1.3.1	April 24, 2014	Bug fixes, optimizations, and added file logging	
1.3.3	June 5, 2014	Bug fixes, optimizations, and balance improvements	
1.4	February 24, 2015	Added bowed percussion, new piano/drum sounds, section-building technology for strings	
1.4.2	March 4, 2015	Critical bug fixes	
1.5	May 21, 2015	New room sound technologies	
2.0	March 6, 2017	Sound library rebuilt, added instruments and MIDI controls	
2.0.2	April 17, 2017	Bug fixes, added vibrato speed control	
3.0	May 30, 2018	Added Finale and Dorico support	
3.1	November 6, 2018	Finale integration improvements, bug fixes	
3.2	December 11, 2018	Dorico concurrent articulation support, bug fixes	
3.3	November 26, 2019	macOS notarization, Dorico 3 support	
3.3.1	December 18, 2019	Bug fixes	
3.3.2	October 18, 2020	Bug fixes	
4.0	May 2, 2023	Introduced NPPE system for third-party VST integration	
4.1.0	June 14, 2023	NPPE improvements, Windows 7 support	
4.2	October 17, 2023	Added support for more libraries (NPPE)	
4.2.1	October 24, 2023	Bug fixes	
4.3	November 9, 2023	NPPE improvements, bug fixes	
4.4	January 2, 2024	Added support for more libraries (NPPE)	
4.5.0	May 29, 2024	Expressive microtiming, bug fixes	
4.5.1	June 2024	Bug fixes	
5.0	May 5, 2025	Added 24 new instruments, new NPPE technologies, timing controls	
5.0.1	May 11, 2025	NPPE removed, bug fixes	
5.1	December 8, 2025	Sound improvement technologies, virtual ORTF panning	
5.1.1	December 15, 2025	Bug fixes	
5.1.2	January 8, 2026	Bug fixes	

== See also ==
- List of music software
- Music notation software
- Virtual Studio Technology
