= Noteworthy =

Noteworthy may refer to:

- Noteworthy (vocal group)
- NoteWorthy Composer (NWC), a scorewriter application
- Wikipedia:Notability
