= Power Tab Editor =

Music notation software

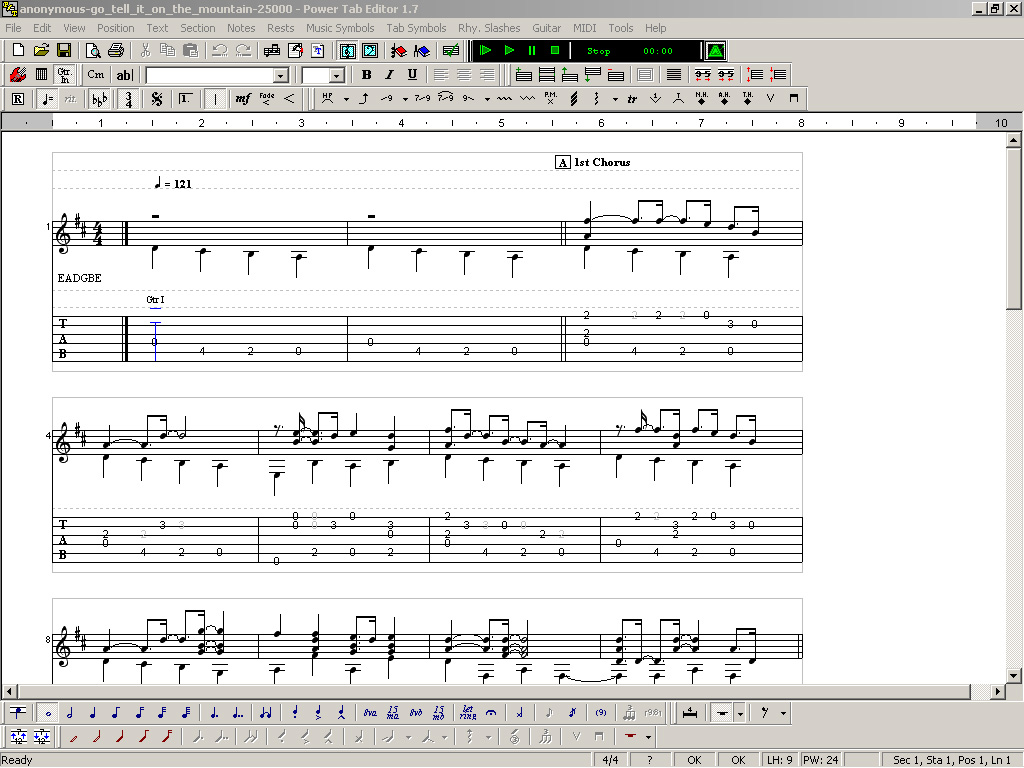
- Power Tab Editor in editing mode running in Windows XP
- Original author: Brad Larsen
- Developer: Brad Larsen
- Stable release: 2.0.22 / June 29, 2025; 4 months ago
- Repository: github.com/powertab/powertabeditor
- Platform: Microsoft Windows, macOS, Linux
- License: GPL-3.0-or-later
- Website: http://www.power-tab.net/guitar.php

Power Tab Editor is a freeware tablature authoring tool created by Brad Larsen for Windows. It is used to create guitar, bass and ukulele tablature scores, among many others. The current version uses the *.ptb file format.

The Power Tab Editor is able to import MIDI tracks, and can export to ASCII Text, HTML, and MIDI formats. In addition, individual sections may be exported as bitmap files.

The program allows for tablature scores to be created alongside standard musical notation. The software achieves this through the input of tablature.

Each Power Tab file contains two scores: guitar and bass. Only one score needs to be used for a Power Tab file. For proper playback, it is required that the time signatures and tempo markers be consistent between the two scores.

The latest version was released in 2000. In 2006, the author released an open-source wxWidgets based program named the PT Parser. This code contains useful information for developers who want to write software that can convert, view, play, or edit Power Tab (.ptb) files. The PT Parser project is hosted at Google Code .

== Power Tab Editor 2.0 project ==
There is a project on GitHub since July 2014 to develop a new version of Power Tab Editor from the scratch, called Power Tab Editor 2.0. It is a cross-platform (Windows, macOS, Linux) open-source solution. This new version can read the old Power Tab 1.7 files as well as Guitar Pro files. A main change is that guitar and bass score are now in the same window.

== Features ==
The software primarily uses tablature notation entry. This is very useful for guitarists who are not familiar with standard notation and for instructing proper positioning on the neck. Other than the expected buttons for normal notation (i.e. time signature, tempo markers, etc.), there are many others that are directed more at the guitarist. These include:

- Slurs – in the form of slides or hammer-ons/pull-offs
- Vibratos and bends
- Harmonics – natural and artificial
- Mutes and palm mutes
- Tremolos and arpeggiated chords
- Whammy bar dips and dives

These buttons can be used in either score and the guitar and bass scores are not restricted to the clef, either. It is possible to switch between treble and bass clefs.

Power Tab also features several tools to enhance appearance, accuracy and playback for the transcribed music:

- Score checker – this checks that there are no notation errors in the score
- Score polisher – this aligns ('justifies') the written music so that it is evenly laid out with no gaps
- Chord identification – this tells you the possible names for the chords entered into Power Tab
- Shifter tool – this moves groups of notes, whether chords or a melody, in pitch or around the fingerboard (maintaining pitch)
- Tonality tools – gives the key signatures that fit best with the music entered
- Chord/tuning dictionary

== Limitations ==
Some limitations of the software include:

- Notes can only be inserted in tablature; it is not possible to enter music in standard modern music notation.
- Power Tab Editor can only utilize up to a maximum of seven guitars across both scores (i.e. MIDI voices).
- Pick-up measures, for example, are counted as errors although they are commonly used in music.
- Swing/shuffle time with swing notes cannot be applied to start or stop part-way through a measure. Conversely, notes in 'even time' cannot be notated within a measure where swing time applies.
- When using high and low melodies, redundant rests that are left out (as in regular notation) are counted as errors.
- A Segno cannot be used for more than one D.S. A Double Segno must be added in the same position.
- The tremolo, reverb and chorus effects only work on computers where their MIDI drivers and hardware support it.

Detailed bugs are listed in the Power Tab Knowledge Base.

== Legal action ==
Based on allegations of copyright violations, the Music Publishers Association has encouraged its members to seek legal action against those sites which distribute Power Tab files of commercial artists. The creator of the Power Tab Editor, Brad Larsen, has stated on his website that the program is not directly affiliated with these sites.

However, the MPA working with the founders of powertabs.net opened a legal powertabs site called Tab Library.

== See also ==
- TuxGuitar
- List of music software
