= Copyist =

Person who makes duplications

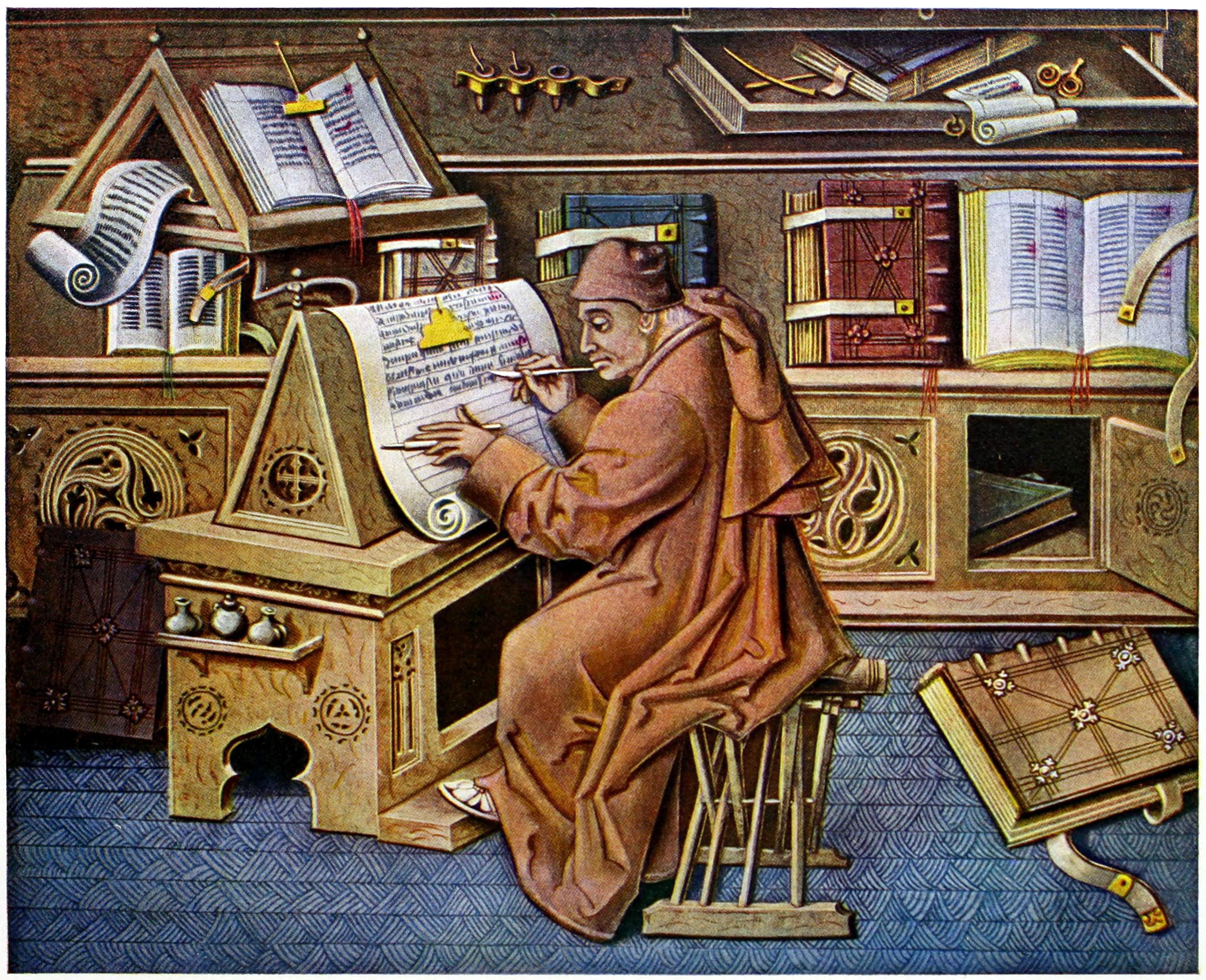
Jean Miélot was the secretary, copyist and translator to Philip the Good.

A copyist is a person who makes duplications of the same thing. The modern use of the term is mainly confined to music copyists, who are employed by the music industry to produce neat copies from a composer or arranger's manuscript. However, the term is sometimes used for artists who make copies of other artists' paintings.

== Music copyists ==
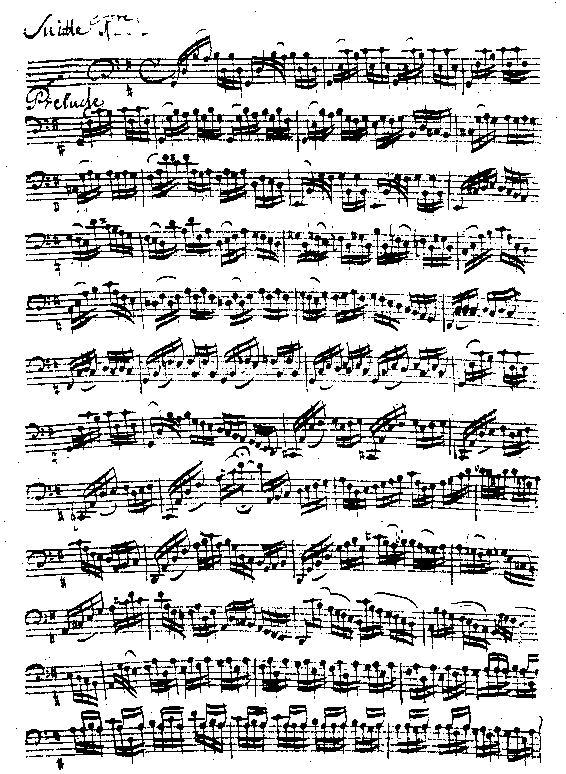
J. S. Bach's Cello Suite No. 1, BWV 1007, in Anna Magdalena Bach's handwriting

Until the 1990s, most copyists worked by hand to write out scores and individual instrumental parts neatly, using a calligraphy pen, staff paper, and often a ruler. Producing parts for an entire orchestra from a full score was a huge task. In the 1990s, copyists began using scorewriters – computer programs which are the music notation–equivalent of a word processor. (Such programs include Sibelius, Finale, MuseScore, LilyPond, and many others.) Scorewriters allow the composer or songwriter to enter the melodies, rhythms and lyrics to their compositions into the computer using a computer mouse or keyboard or by playing the notes on a MIDI-equipped instrument. Once a composition is fully entered into a scorewriting program, the computer can be instructed to print out the parts for all of the different instruments.

Both handwritten and computer-based copying require significant understanding of musical notation, music theory, the musical styles and conventions of different styles of music (e.g., regarding appropriate ornamentation, harmony rules pertaining to accidentals, etc.), and strong attention to detail and past conventions. Johann Sebastian Bach's second wife, Anna Magdalena, regularly copied compositions by her husband and sometimes by other composers, e.g. "Bist du bei mir" in the Notebook for Anna Magdalena Bach. Ludwig van Beethoven had a contentious relationship with his copyists, who often made mistakes that remained uncorrected until the advent of urtext editions; some musicologists have devoted a lot of effort to identifying Beethoven's copyists.

== In museums ==
Copyist programmes are run by a number of museums that offer permits to members of the public. These permits grant artists access to museums, enabling them to produce their own copies of artworks. Copyists copy to enhance their skills or to financially benefit by selling their work.

=== History ===
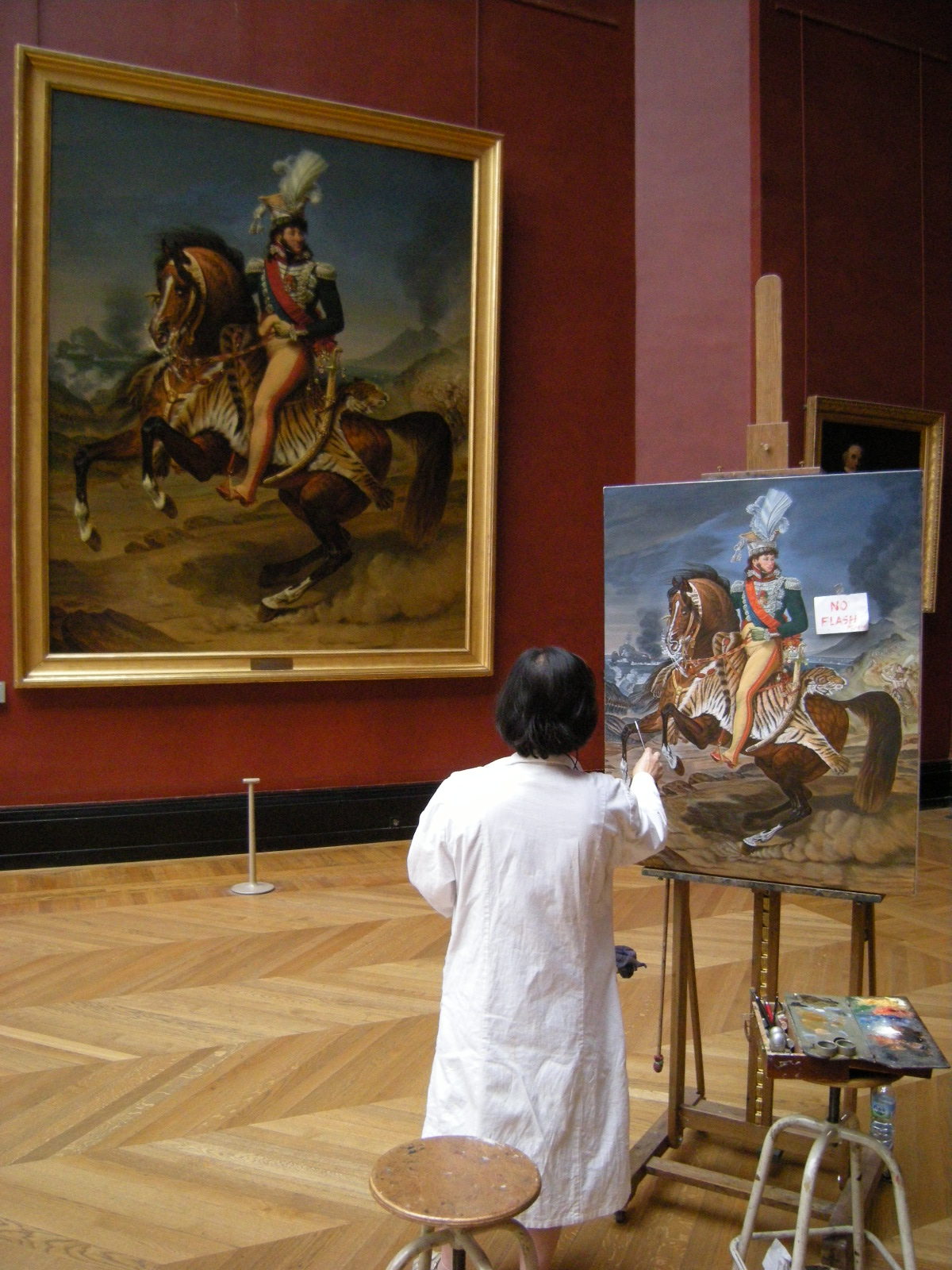
Copyist at work in the Louvre (2009)

The Louvre in Paris was one of the first museums to enable artists to copy art in 1793. Other major museums soon followed such as the Metropolitan Museum of Art (the Met) in New York City in 1872. To become a copyist in 1880 at the Louvre, a simple request at the office of the secretary was sufficient. After gaining permission to use the museum, a complimentary easel was provided to the artist for a year. This is a tradition that still occurs in many copyist programs today, but the availability of permits is more limited in the 21st century.

Permits are renewable, artists often complete more than one session. Copyists are still required to follow certain traditions such as being required to cover the floor with a drop cloth to prevent damage to the gallery floors at the Met.

Notable artists such as Picasso began practising their art as copyists in museums. The utility of this programme has frequently been emphasised, for instance artists such as Paul Cézanne and Cennino Cennini. Ingres and Delacroix highly emphasised the value of learning from other painters by going to the Louvre and discovering their artistic personalities. The benefits of copying were addressed in a study by Okada and Ishibashi (2004). It was found that copying caused the participants to assess and compare their own artistic style with others, which led to more creative pieces, in comparison to the control group.

=== Permits ===
At some centres the availability of permits has been drastically reduced over time due to the popularity of the programme. There are now selection processes involving the submission of a portfolio, along with a list of potential pieces the artist would like to copy. Upon a successful application, artists are normally able to copy their first or second choice. The permits tend to be given to locals, since the artists will be required to spend a lot of time in the gallery.

=== Art selection ===
The museums allow artists to pick from a variety of different pieces in their collection. Their selection is subject to certain conditions, such as safety concerns and whether the piece is in the permanent collection. In 1880, only two copyists were allowed to paint the Mona Lisa in the Louvre at one time, due to its popularity. The Prado forbids the copying of certain works, such as Las Meninas, because they attract crowds. Some copyists used to be able to make a living from selling their copies made in the Prado, however copyists find it much harder to do this in the 21st century.

=== Forgeries ===
Artists frequently paint only a selected area of the work, due to time constraints or individualistic stylistic decisions. However, to discourage and prevent the sale of exact forgeries, the copy must be different in size or scale. At the Met, the copyist's work must be different in its dimensions by 10% in comparison to the original work. Upon completion, a copyist's work produced in the Louvre is subject to an examination to check for any forgeries. One such violation would be if the work were less than one-fifth bigger or smaller than the original. After inspection, the copy is then stamped and signed by a member of the Louvre's copy staff.

The difference between a forgery and a copy involves the intention behind the act; a copy is based upon honesty and does not try to replace the original. In the late 19th century, the number of copies which were sold under false pretences was high due to the absence of any considerable legislative deterrence. The treatment of forgeries of art was not as severe as other types of forgery such as that of legal documents, whereby the punishment was death (until 1832). The reasoning behind the lack of judicial constraints was due to the insignificant economic impact. Another reason why the number of forgeries was high is because it was harder to identify a copy due to shortcomings in technology.

=== Gender stereotypes ===
Copying in the 19th century was not constrained by gender, in terms of accessibility. However, gender stereotyping was prevalent regardless: female copyists frequently had their work denounced as lacking creativity. Male copyists were viewed as using the experience as a way to enhance their artistic abilities. These perspectives mirrored contemporary misconceptions around women lacking intelligence and so inferior to their male counterparts. These attitudes meant that women were rarely accused of being a fraud, because this would have implied the possession of mental skill (deceit). Initially only men were professional copyists, with women adopting a lower rank such as amateur.

Being a female copyist in the 19th century regularly had negative implications upon a woman's reputation due to the high risk of slander and damnation. The nature of their work meant that it was relatively easy for men to engage with them, for example by escorting them to the gallery. As a result, rumours would frequently be spread and often result in the ruining of a woman's standing in society.

== See also ==
- Amanuensis
- Music engraving
- Scribe
- Scrivener
