= Musition =

Musition is an educational music theory software program. Musition contains 34 topics and allows students to improve their theory knowledge and musicianship. Teachers can tailor the drills and testing features of Musition, to assist students in reaching specific goals, or to help them prepare for particular assessment tasks. Musition allows teachers to track students' progress using the syllabus, test and record keeping features.

== Content ==
Musition offers 34 topics covering music theory fundamentals for students of classical, jazz and contemporary music. The core content includes lessons and drills on note reading, intervals, scales, chords, rhythm, beaming, meter, key signatures, terms, symbols, and instruments. Other areas of study include modulation, enharmonic notes, ornaments, diatonic chords, and jazz chord symbols.

== Features ==
Musition allows students to practice tasks from any of the predefined levels and syllabi that are provided with the software, or they can create their own custom level to focus on specific problem areas. Teachers can create and save their own syllabi, and assign them to each class. The Tests feature also allows teachers to create a custom electronic worksheet for their students to complete.

Using the Course feature, students can be guided through a series of lessons, drills and tests that are specific to their learning needs. These graduated learning pathways provide constant feedback, support and lesson reinforcement. Teachers can review student progress in practice, tests and courses using the Reports feature, and print or export the results as needed.

Musition is currently available in 2 different versions. The Student version, which is designed for the home user, allows tracking of up to 3 students’ results and cannot be networked. The full version allows tracking of an unlimited number of students’ results and is fully network compatible. The content of both versions is otherwise identical.

== History ==
Musition was first published in 1997 by Rising Software (also the publishers of Auralia ear training software).

Version release dates:

1997 – Musition 1.0 for Windows
1999 – Musition 2.0 for Windows
2006 – Musition 3.0 for Windows
2008 – Musition 3.5 for Windows
2010 – Musition 4 for Windows and Mac
