= MagicScore =

Music notation software

- Developer: Maestro Music Software
- Stable release: 8.280 / 2017
- Operating system: Microsoft Windows
- Available in: 9 languages
- List of languages Danish, English, French, German, Italian, Polish, Russian, Spanish, Ukrainian
- Type: Scorewriter
- License: Proprietary
- Website: www.musicaleditor.com

MagicScore is a music notation and composition software product for PCs running Microsoft Windows. Versions of the product sell under the names Maestro Composer, Maestro Notation, and Maestro Notation for MS Word. Two free products in the same product line are offered under the names Maestro Performer and Maestro Online.

== History ==
MagicScore was created in 2000 by a small group of software developers to serve as an entry-level music notation program. In addition to basic music composition tools the program included several more advanced features. These included a virtual piano, a virtual guitar, a velocity editor, dynamics, chords, articulations, and other symbols. MagicScore also provided an instrument list with a simple audio mixer.

In January 2003 software developer Dmitriy Golovanov met with Sergey Samokhin, the main developer of the MagicScore project. Following this meeting it was decided that Golovanov's company DGSoftware would distribute the program under the new company name of MagicScore Music Software.

The first public release of the new MagicScore was in 2003. The program came in two different versions, MagicScore Maestro and MagicScore Standard.

In 2005 the company released MagicScore 4 that included a redesigned interface. Along with the visual redesign came differentiation in the features of their product line, resulting in three unique versions of the software:

- MagicScore Maestro
- MagicScore Classic
- MagicScore School

In 2006 the team began working on ways to allow users to embed music notation in other documents and in web pages via Internet Explorer. This new version, MagicScore Maestro 5, received the PC Magazine Product of the Year Award for Multimedia. Beginning in 2006 and continuing for the next five years the company reached out to the United States music community by sponsoring prizes in the NSBA/MENC Composition Talent Search contest.

In 2007 MagicScore's developers began to reach out to other music experts and consultants from mostly European countries including Switzerland, Germany, Finland, Ukraine, Russia, and Moldova. Through these efforts they added new functions including cross-staff beaming, MIDI events editors, a new piano roll (playback) editor, and others.

Version 6 of the software was released in 2008 with numerous feature enhancements and the addition of a free version, MagicScore Print Sheet Music. Along with these releases the company began to sell music scanning software programs manufactured by other software companies in order to offer a more complete and useful music notation solution for musicians.

2009 brought one of the largest upgrades to MagicScore with the release of Music Notation for MS Word. This product made it possible for users to dynamically embed music notation files within Microsoft Word documents.

This was marketed as an effort to provide music teachers with a solid set of tools to allow them to create educational worksheets and other documents more easily and quickly than with traditional copy and paste techniques.

In 2010 the company's flagship version of the product, MagicScore Maestro, received first place and Gold awards from the independent music notation software review site, TopTenReviews.com, while in 2011 and 2012 MagicScore for the first time took part in Musik Messe (one of the two largest music product exhibitions in the world).

At Music Messe 2012 MagicScore Music Software announced a new company name and the newly named Maestro family of music notation products. At that time the software family consisted of:

- Maestro Composer – their top-of-the-line music notation and composition software program
- Maestro Notation – a version specifically aimed at print music publishers
- Maestro Notation for MS Word – embeds and edits music notation directly in Word documents
- Maestro Performer – an entry level, free sheet music program
- Maestro Online – a free product that allows users to publish their scores inside web pages

MagicScore Music Software is now an integrated part of Maestro Music Software but the company continues development of some of the MagicScore products. MagicScore and Maestro use the same file format and are fully compatible with each other.

== Software name changes and current status ==
With the incorporation of MagicScore into Maestro Composer the company has stopped development of MagicScore Classic. Other changes include:

- Music Notation for MS Word renamed to Maestro Notation for MS Word
- MagicScore Print Sheet Music renamed to Maestro Performer
- MagicScore Online renamed to Maestro Online
- MagicScore Maestro – the top-of-the-line MagicScore notation program will continue to be sold
- MagicScore School – an entry-level program that continues to be sold

== New software in development ==
The company has announced its intention to continue the development of new software versions but no details have been provided.

In January 2013 Maestro Music Software released MSS Guitar – the guitar tablature and notation software.

== Current unified Maestro Music Software products family ==
As of August 2016:

- MagicScore Maestro
- MagicScore Notation for MS Word
- MagicScore Guitar
- MagicScore SongWriter
- MagicScore Chords!
- MagicScore Piano
- MagicScore MIDI to MP3 converter
- MagicScore Book
- MagicScore Online

== See also ==
- List of music software
