= Scorewriter =

Software used for creating sheet music

A scorewriter, or music notation program is software for creating, editing and printing sheet music. A scorewriter is to music notation what a word processor is to text, in that they typically provide flexible editing and automatic layout, and produce high-quality printed results.

The first modern score manipulation program was Mockingbird, written by John Maxwell and Severo Ornstein at Xerox PARC in 1980 on a Dorado computer. It preceded MIDI so an electronic keyboard had to be modified to enable interaction (input and playback) with the program. The WYSIWYG program was envisioned as a composer's amanuensis, but as it was an experimental program it never reached beyond PARC, though it influenced commercial programs which soon followed.

Most scorewriters, especially those from the 2000s, can record notes played on a MIDI keyboard (or other MIDI instruments), and play music back via MIDI or virtual instruments. Playback is especially useful for novice composers and music students, and when musicians are not available or affordable. Several free programs are widely used, such as MuseScore. The three commercial main professional-level programs in wide use are Sibelius, Dorico, and the now-discontinued Finale.

== Comparison with multitrack sequencer software ==
Multitrack sequencer software and scorewriters typically employ different methods for notation input and display.

Scorewriters are based on traditional music notation, using staff lines and round note heads, which originates from European classical music. They use symbols representing durations in sound and silence, dynamics, articulations and tempo. Some also allow users to import and/or create their own symbols. Multitrack sequencer software typically uses a multitrack recorder metaphor as the main interface, with multiple tracks and track segments. Individual tracks can be edited using graphic notation in the form of a "piano roll"-guided input for the control of MIDI-based hardware and software instruments.

A third approach has also emerged that combines the first two input methods into a digital audio workstation, allowing users to score parts using traditional notation, the graphic notation of the piano roll, and recording acoustic or electronic instruments in real time alongside the existing scores. With all three methods, the computer keyboard, mouse, and a MIDI musical keyboard can be used to enter music that can then be edited with traditional or piano-roll-based notation.

== History ==
The rapid growth of desktop computers in the 1980s saw the creation of dozens of early scorewriters (see list of scorewriters). They were a boon to young composers, music educators and composition students, providing a much less expensive way to create scores and parts for orchestral music and other works. However, they were hard to use; and while scores were readable, they did not look like professionally engraved scores or parts. An exception was SCORE notation software. Developed in the late '80s, it was used mostly by commercial publishers, as its price put it out of the reach of most non-professional composers/copyists. During the 1990s, many of these early programs, such as the Mosaic notation program, fell into disuse, as newer programs surpassed them in ease of use and output quality. Finale and Sibelius were released, with high-quality output and a wide range of sophisticated features that made them suitable for almost all kinds of music applications.

By 2000, the market was dominated by Finale (particularly in the US) and Sibelius (which had dominated the UK since 1993, and expanded worldwide after its Windows release in 1998). Inexpensive programs such as capella gained a significant share of the market in some countries. Sibelius and Finale still dominated the market as of 2012.

In 2006, Sibelius was purchased by Avid. In a 2012 restructuring, Sibelius's London office was closed and the development team dismissed. In February 2013, Steinberg announced it had hired the former Sibelius team to create a new scorewriter, Dorico, which was released in October 2016. The duo of Sibelius and Dorico are today's leading professional-level programs.

== Functionality ==
All scorewriters allow the user to input, edit and print music notation to varying degrees of sophistication. They range from programs which can write a simple song, piano piece or guitar tab, to those that can handle the complexities of orchestral music, specialist notations (from early music to avant-garde), and high-quality music engraving.

Music can usually be input using the mouse, computer keyboard, or a MIDI keyboard. A few allow input by scanning scores using musical OCR; by playing or singing into a microphone; or by using a touch screen.

Most scorewriters also allow users to play the music back, using MIDI or virtual instruments such as VST instruments. The screen can show at one time both the score and, by changing the colour of keys on a virtual piano's keyboard, the notes being played. Although sequencers can also write some musical notation, they are primarily for recording and playing music. Scorewriters can typically write more complex and sophisticated notation than sequencers can.

Some scorewriters allow users to customize and fine-tune the printed output to a considerable degree, as is required by publishers to produce high-quality music engraving and to suit their individual house style.

A few scorewriters allow users to publish scores on the Internet, where they can be (for example) played back, transposed, and printed out, perhaps for a fee.

Most scorewriters provide other musical functions such as transposing; producing separate instrumental parts from a full score; or applying musical transformations such as retrograde. Some can automatically create instrumental exercises and student worksheets. Some support plug-ins, often developed by users or other companies. Other features may include version control, change tracking, graphics import and export, Post-It-like sticky notes, etc.

=== Tablature editor ===
A tablature editor is a piece of software that aids in creating tablature such as guitar tablature. Most tablature editors have features like playback and MIDI file import.

The first tablature program was written for the Amstrad CPC 464 in 1986. "Tab Composer CPC" was implemented in Locomotive BASIC 1.0. It offered a multi-page graphical WYSIWYG, 3-channel polyphonic playback and volume and tone envelope functionality, as well as save and load. BASIC programs could be generated for direct playback without the program as well, facilitating easy integration of the created musical content into other programs such as games. The user interface was in German only. An attempt was made to publish the program as a type-in listing in the German CPC Schneider International magazine. The program was rejected mainly due to poor (handwritten) documentation, and a tedious user interface. The author is still in possession of the original correspondence with the CPC Schneider International editorial staff, including the letter of rejection.

Notable editors with facility for creating and editing tablature notation for guitar and other fretted instruments include:

- Finale
- G7, part of Sibelius
- Guitar Pro
- LilyPond
- MagicScore/Maestro
- Mozart the music processor
- MuseScore
- MusicEase
- MusEdit
- Notion and Progression, a smaller version of Notion, specially for guitar
- Power Tab Editor
- TuxGuitar

== File formats ==
Almost all scorewriters use their own file formats for saving files. Hence, in order to move notation between different scorewriters (or to/from other kinds of music software such as sequencers), most scorewriters can also import or export one or more standard interchange file formats, such as:

- Standard MIDI File is supported by almost all scorewriters. However, as this format was designed for playback (e.g. by sequencers) rather than notation, it only produces approximate results and much notational information is lost in the process. If the score is to be presented, a WAV file (rather than MIDI) may be made from the score to give a more natural and accurate rendition of the written score.
- MusicXML has in recent years (as of 2012) become the standard interchange format for accurate notation.
- Notation Interchange File Format (NIFF) is a now-obsolete file format that was supported by a few scorewriters.

This Comparison of scorewriters details which score writers can import and export to PDF, text (ASCII), picture (PNG, SVG, EMF) and sound (Vorbis OGG) file formats.

There are also human-readable text-based formats such as ABC notation, LilyPond, ASCII tab and NoteWorthy Composer text files. These are easily rendered as speech by screen reading software. The Score extension to MediaWiki can render, and generate an audio preview of, the first two formats.

== Gallery ==
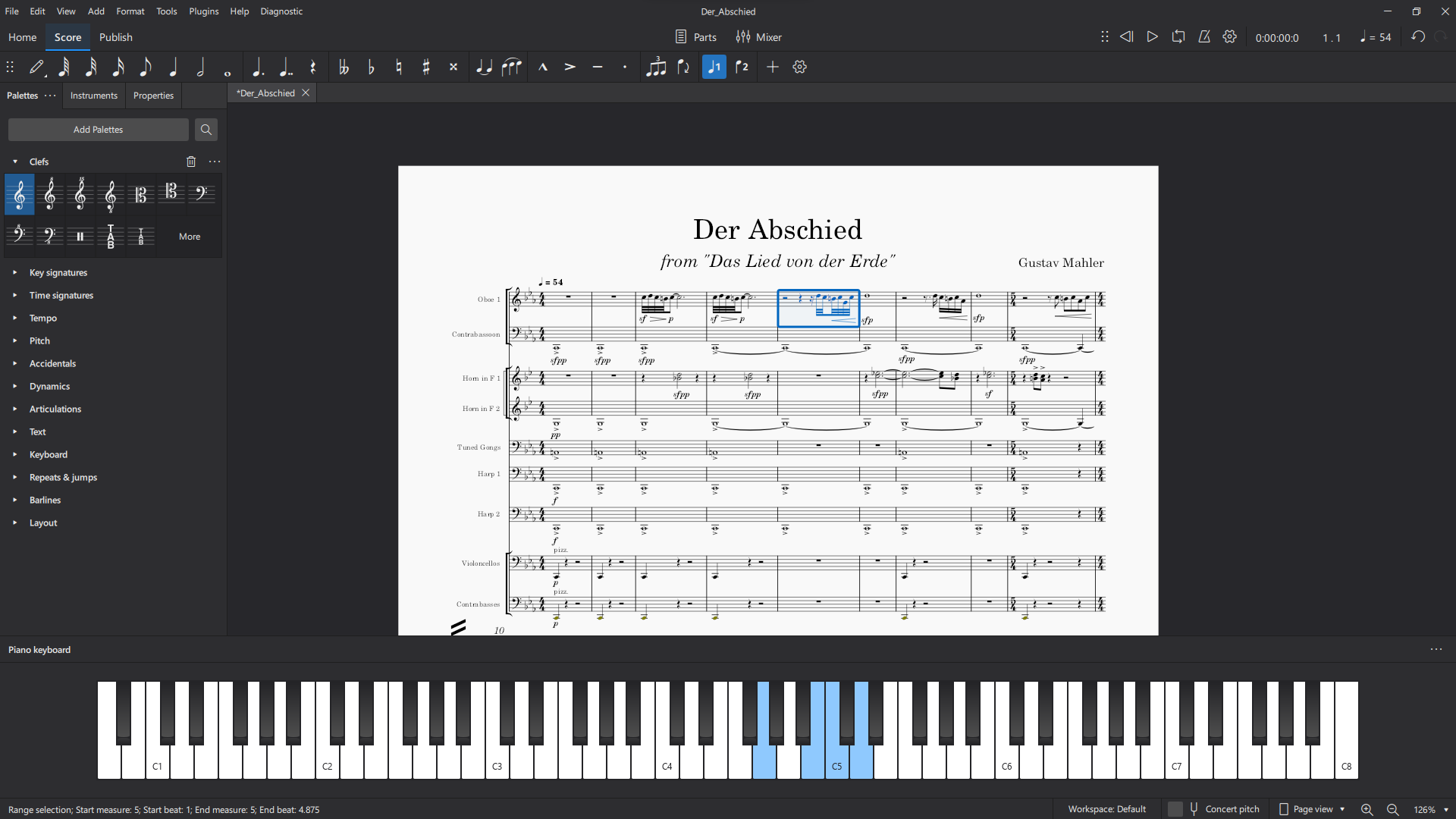
MuseScore 4.0 in dark mode, showing palettes, and full screen mode

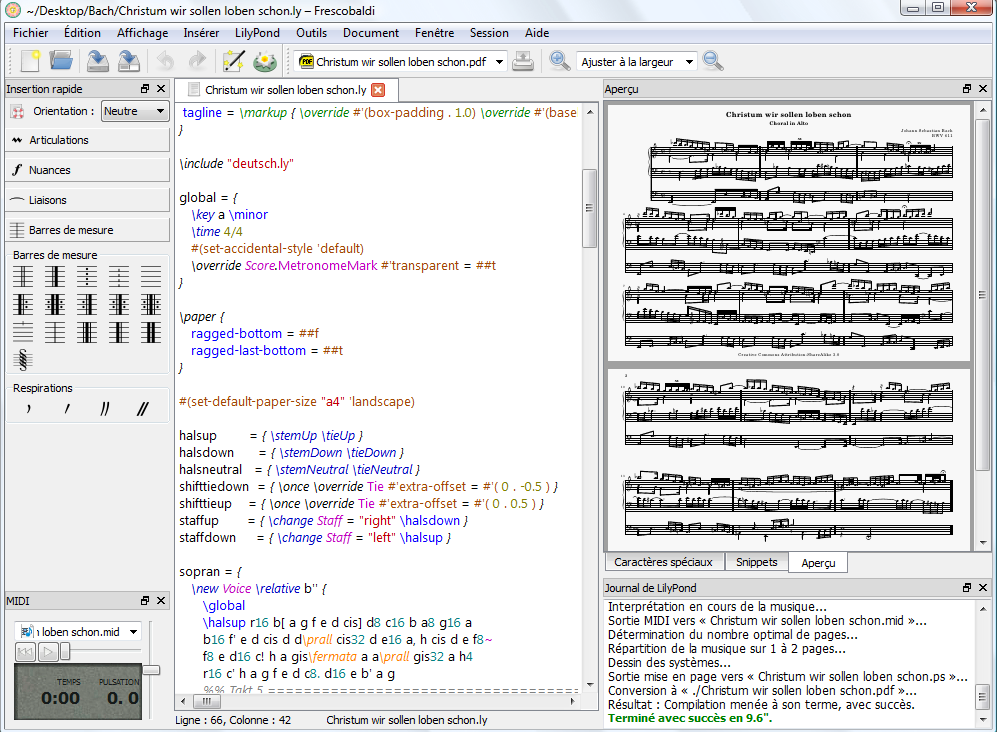
Frescobaldi on Microsoft Windows

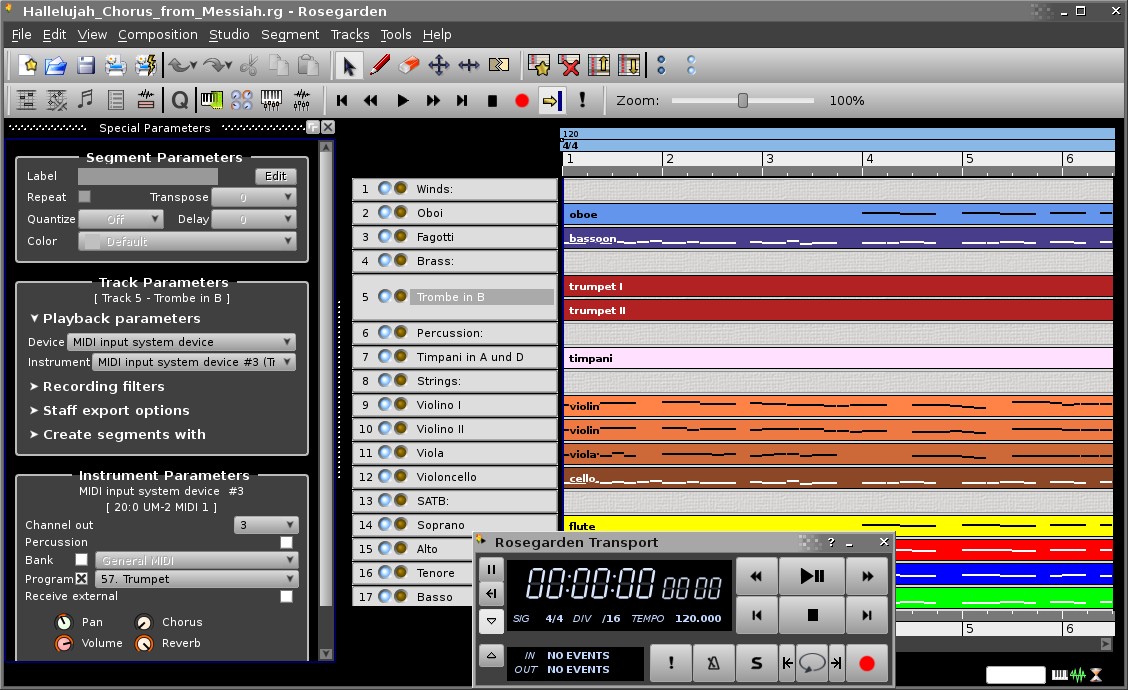
Rosegarden 10.02.1 screenshot

== See also ==
- Comparison of scorewriters
- International Music Score Library Project (IMSLP)
- Player piano
- Scorereader
- List of music software
