= Rastrum =

Writing instrument used to draw staff lines for sheet music

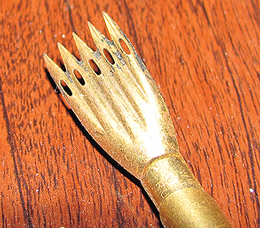
Single-staff rastrum

Musical staff

A rastrum (pl. rastra) or raster is a five-pointed writing implement used in music manuscripts to draw parallel staff lines when drawn horizontally across a blank piece of sheet music. The word "raster" is derived from the Latin for "rake". Rastra were used to draw lines on paper that had not been pre-ruled, and were widely used in Europe until printed staff paper became cheap and common in the nineteenth century. Some rastra are able to draw more than one staff at a time. Rastrology, the study of the use of the rastrum, is a branch of music manuscript studies that uses information about the rastrum to help find the date and provenance of musical materials.

== Modern variants ==
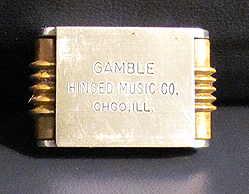
Roller-type rastrum which can draw two staff sizes

In recent years, rastra made of five ballpoint pens have been marketed to students and composers.

It was common in primary and secondary schools to use rastra that use chalk on a chalk board for music education. They may be called staff liners. An alternative is to use a chalk board with staff lines etched in or taped on.

Some rastra hold markers for use on whiteboards.

Another variant is the so-called "Stravigor", a wheeled instrument that Stravinsky attempted to patent around 1911. He used them extensively in his compositional sketchbooks.
