= Drum tablature =

Simplified percussion notation

Drum tablature, commonly known as a drum tab, is a form of simplified percussion notation, or tablature for percussion instruments. Instead of the durational notes normally seen on a piece of sheet music, drum tab uses proportional horizontal placement to indicate rhythm and vertical placement on a series of lines to represent which drum from the drum kit to stroke. Drum tabs frequently depict drum patterns.

== Key or legend ==
The number of lines in a specific tab will vary depending on the number of different drums used during a specific section of music. Below is an example of a basic drum kit.

  CC|-Crash cymbal----|[1]
  HH|-Hi-hat----------|
  Rd|-Ride cymbal-----|
  SN|-Snare drum------|
  T1|-High tom--------|
  T2|-Low tom---------|
  FT|-Floor tom-------|
  BD|-Bass drum-------|
  Hf/FH|-Hi-hat w/foot|

=== Techniques ===
Tablature can use various letter and symbols to denote different cymbal types or other drum techniques. These are the tablature symbols that represent various techniques, though these may vary:

==== Cymbals ====
  |-x-| Strike cymbal or hi-hat
  |-X-| Strike loose hi-hat, or hit crash hard
  |-o-| Open hi-hat
  |-#-| Choke cymbal (grab cymbal with hand after striking it)
  |-s-| Splash cymbal
  |-c-| China cymbal
  |-b-| Bell of ride
  |-x-| Click hi-hat with foot

==== Drums ====
  |-o-| Strike
  |-O-| Accent
  |-g-| Ghost note
  |-f-| Flam
  |-d-| Drag
  |-b-| Soft one-handed roll
  |-B-| Accented one-handed roll
  |-@-| Snare rim

== Example ==
The common time rhythm pattern below is first presented in standard notation; following is the corresponding pattern translated into drum tab.

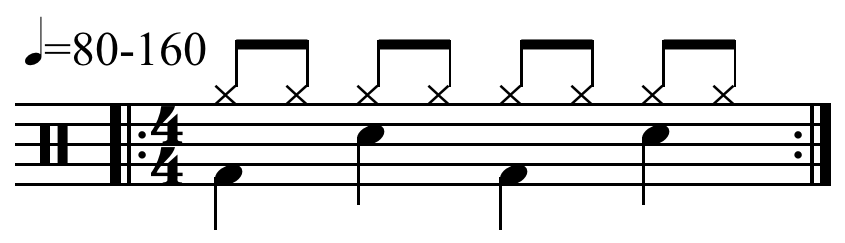

  B = Bass drum   HH = Hi-hat S = Snare drum
  HH|x-x-x-x-x-x-x-x-||
   S|----o-------o---||
   B|o-------o-------||
     1 + 2 + 3 + 4 +
