= MusEdit =

Music notation software

Example: March (Classical Guitar Solo)

MusEdit is a scorewriter program for Microsoft Windows, developed by Doug Rogers / Yowza software and first launched in 1997. The current version (4.0.3) was released in 2010.

In February 2011, the author told the MusEdit Yahoo group that after "upgrading and supporting MusEdit for nearly 15 years" he "won't be able to continue supporting MusEdit" and plans he "to make MusEdit 'Open Source' by mid-March, 2011. This means the MusEdit source code will be free and open for anyone to use and modify as they wish under a standard 'open source' license." Releases are available on Rogers's website.

== Features ==
MusEdit allows the user to produce professional-quality music scores for all kinds of solo instruments, ensembles and orchestras. The music files can be played back, printed, exported as graphics and used to generate MIDI files and text tab. Musedit can also import MIDI files and text tab. For example, Musedit can be used to create and play back:

- Music scores with up to 20 parts.
- Music and Tablature for Guitar, Bass, and other stringed instruments.
- Piano music.
- Drum parts.
- Song Books, Hymn sheets etc. (with lyrics, vocal lines, chord symbols, accompaniment etc.).
- Music lessons and other educational material.

== General usage ==
Scores are created by combining various lines (music staffs, Tablature, text lines, chord diagrams etc.) into “Line groups”, which are in effect "score systems".

MusEdit acts like a "word-processor for music", with a system of keyboard shortcuts and a “symbols toolbox” allowing music and text to be entered quickly and easily. Many functions (including note spacing) are under full manual control rather than being automated. Operations such as select, copy, cut and paste etc. are analogous to those of a standard word-processor.

The position of many elements of the score can be finely adjusted by "nudging" (with the keyboard cursors) both horizontally and vertically - this includes text, accidentals, ties and notes of a 1/4 and above. In addition, the user can adjust the length and shape of individual slurs and ties.

MusEdit supports linked Music Staff / TAB systems which means that notes entered onto the music staff appear also in the linked TAB line and vice versa. This is particularly useful for guitarists and other stringed instrument players. The full range of guitar symbols and notation is also supported. Instruments in any tuning with up to 8 strings can be notated.

== See also ==
- List of music software
