= Chord diagram (music) =

Visualization of string instrument fingering

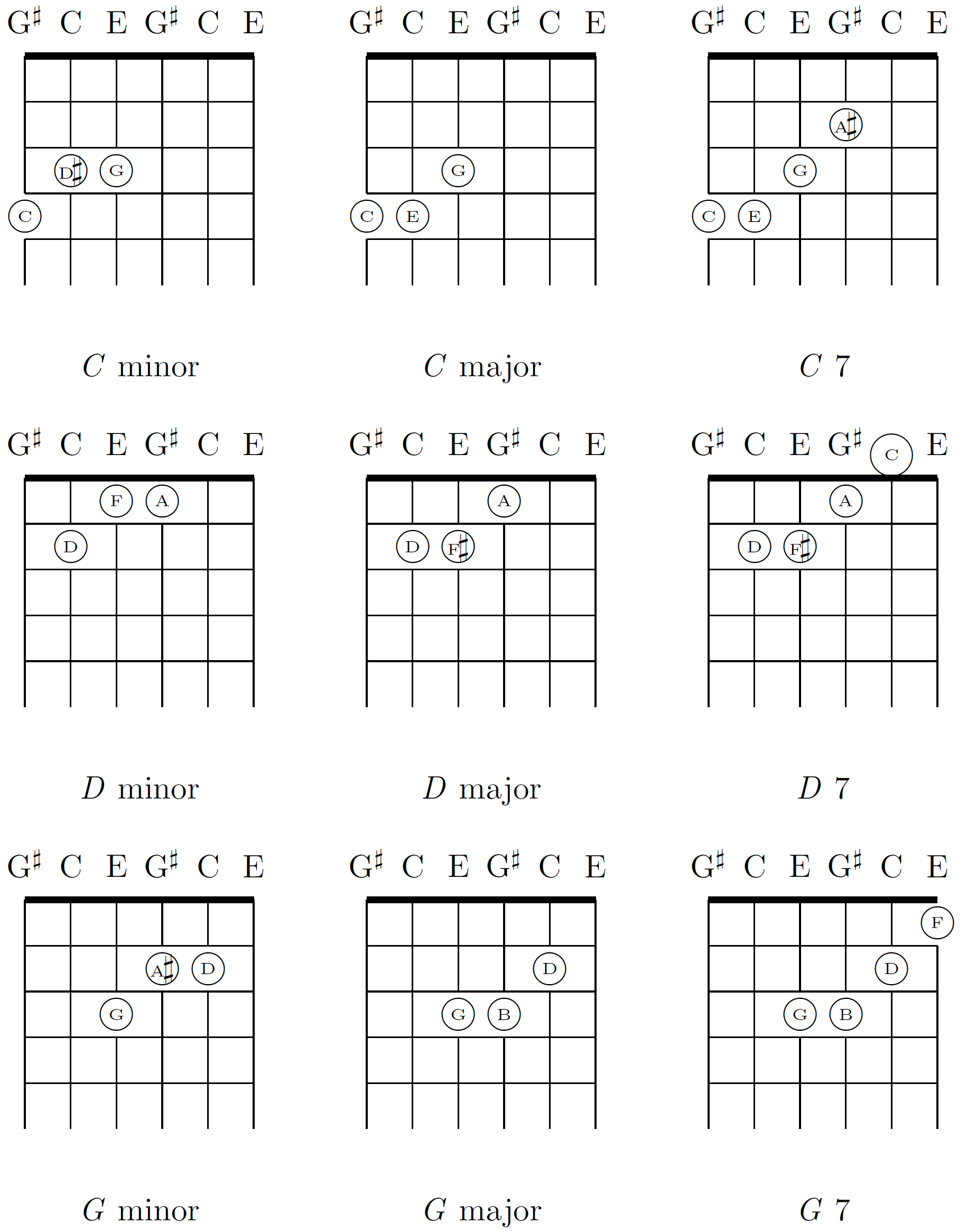
Chord diagrams for some common chords in major-thirds tuning

In music, a chord diagram (also called a fretboard diagram or fingering diagram) is a diagram indicating the fingering of a chord on fretted string instruments, showing a schematic view of the fretboard with markings for the frets that should be pressed when playing the chord. Instruments that commonly use this notation include the guitar, banjo, lute, and mandolin.

== See also ==
- Tablature, a related notation for the sequence of chords in a piece of music
