= Guitar Pro =

Scorewriter and MIDI editor

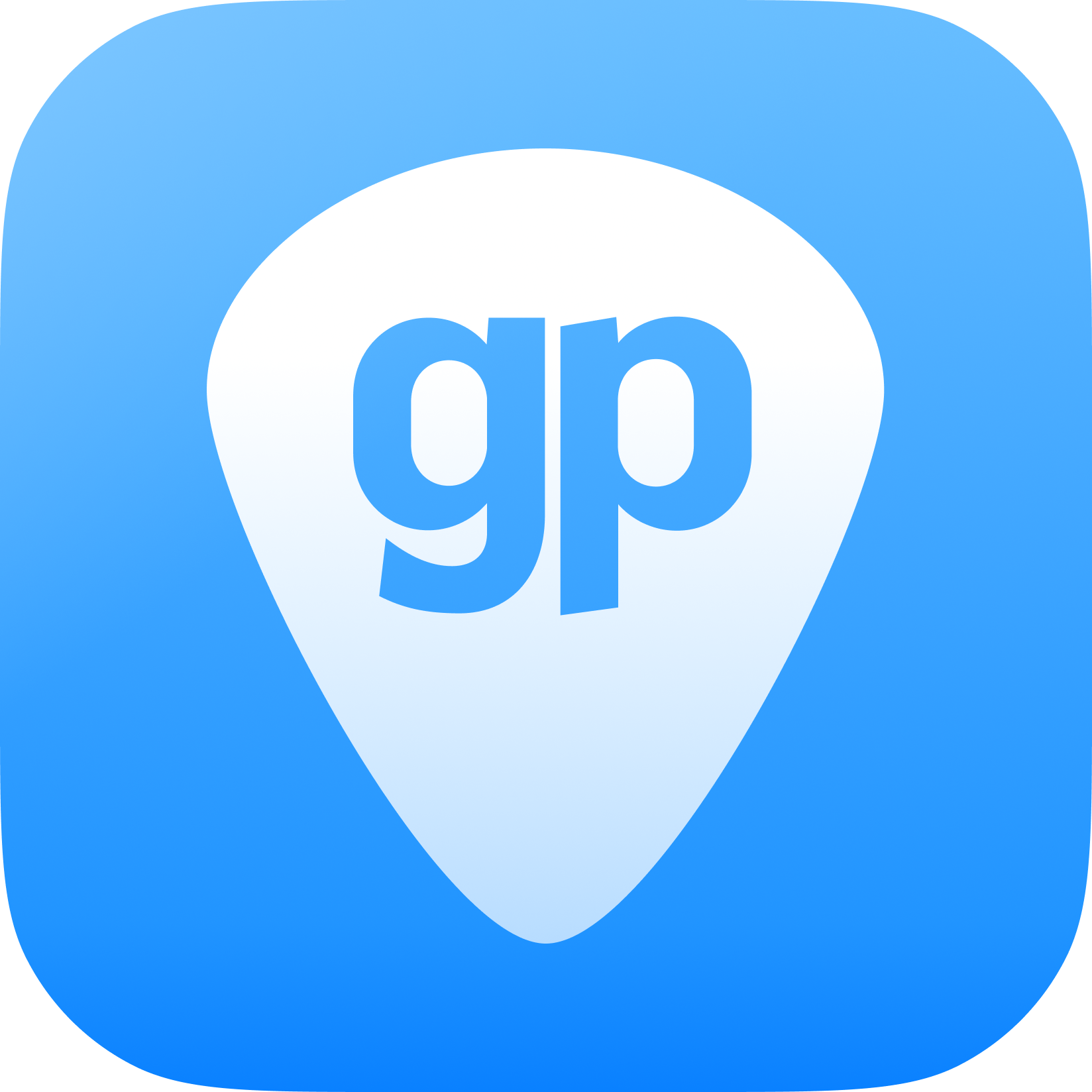
- Developer: Arobas Music
- Stable release: 8.1.5 / October 27, 2025; 6 months ago
- Written in: C++
- Operating system: Microsoft Windows, macOS
- Type: Scorewriter; MIDI Editor
- License: Proprietary
- Website: www.guitar-pro.com

Guitar Pro is a proprietary multitrack editor of guitar and bass tablature and musical scores, possessing a built-in MIDI-editor, a plotter of chords, a player, a metronome and other tools for musicians. It has versions for Windows and macOS and is written by the French company Arobas Music.

== History ==
There have been six popular public major releases of the software: versions 3–8. Guitar Pro was initially designed as a tablature editor, but has since evolved into a full-fledged score writer including support for many musical instruments other than guitar.

Until it reached version 4, the software was only available for Microsoft Windows. Later, Guitar Pro 5 (released November 2005) undertook a year-long porting effort and Guitar Pro 5 for the macOS was released in July 2006. On April 5, 2010, Guitar Pro 6, a completely redesigned version, was released. This version also supports Linux, with 32-bit Ubuntu being the officially supported distribution.

On February 6, 2011, the first ever portable release of Guitar Pro (version 6) was made available on the App Store for support with the iPhone, iPod Touch, and iPad running iOS 3.0 or later. An Android version was released on December 17, 2014.

In 2011, a version was made to work with the Fretlight guitar called Guitar Pro 6 Fretlight Ready. The tablature notes being played in Guitar Pro 6 Fretlight Ready show up on the Fretlight guitar's LEDs which are encased within the guitar's fretboard to teach you the song.

In April 2017, Guitar Pro 7 was officially released with new features and dropped Linux support.

Guitar Pro 8 was released in May 2022 with a range of new features, most notably support for Apple Silicon processors.

== Background ==
The software makes use of multiple instrument tracks which follow standard staff notation, but also shows the notes on tablature notation. It gives the musician visual access to keys (banjos, drumkits, etc.) for the song to be composed, and allows live previews of the notes to be played at a specified tempo. It allows for certain tracks to be muted and provides dynamic control over the volume, phasing and other aspects of each track. Included in version 4 onwards is a virtual keyboard that allows pianists to add their part to a composition.

Guitar Pro outputs sound by means of a library and/or, as of version 5, the "Realistic Sound Engine" (RSE) which uses high quality recorded samples for a more realistic playback. By using its live preview feature musicians may play along with the song, following the tablature played in real time.

Files composed using Guitar Pro are recorded in the GP, GPX, GP5, GP4 and GP3 format, corresponding to versions 7, 6, 5, 4, and 3 of the software. These file formats lack forward compatibility, and opening them in an older version of Guitar Pro prompts the user to upgrade their software to the respective version.

The distribution of these files was widely carried out on the Internet, being produced by fans often by ear, and included songs both of underground and mainstream artists. The main hub for Guitar Pro tabs was (and still is) the Arobas-owned mySongBook. However, the Music Publishers Association (MPA), claiming to represent sheet music companies, raised copyright issues and pressured websites offering the files to cease distribution. This included then-president Lauren Keiser threatening jail time for those involved. Subsequently, distribution became much more dispersed, and mySongBook itself was forced to follow much stricter practices.

== See also ==
- List of music software
