= Dorico =

Scorewriter

- Dorico 3.5 running on macOS
- Original authors: Andrew Dodman; Michael Eastwood; Stefan Fuhrmann; András Kéri; James Larcombe; Paul Walmsley; Graham Westlake
- Developer: Steinberg
- Release: 19 October 2016; 9 years ago
- Stable release: 6.2.10 / 31 March 2026; 3 months ago
- Operating system: macOS, Windows, iPadOS
- Available in: 9 languages
- List of languages Chinese (Simplified), English, French, German, Italian, Japanese, Portuguese, Russian, Spanish
- Type: Scorewriter (music notation)
- License: Proprietary software
- Website: www.steinberg.net/dorico/

Dorico (/ˈdɒrɪkoʊ/) is music notation software for macOS, Windows, and iPadOS developed by Steinberg, a subsidiary of Yamaha. It is one of the leading professional-level music notation programs alongside Sibelius and the since-discontinued Finale. Dorico's development team consists of most of the former core developers of Sibelius.

== History ==
After the developers of Sibelius were laid off in a 2012 restructuring by Avid, most of the team were re-hired by the competing company, Steinberg, to create a scorewriter. The project was unveiled on February 20, 2013 by the product marketing manager, Daniel Spreadbury, on a blog, Making Notes. The software was first released on 19 October 2016.

The program's title, Dorico was revealed on the same blog on May 17, 2016. The name honors the 16th-century Italian music engraver Valerio Dorico (1500 – c. 1565), who printed first editions of sacred music by Giovanni Pierluigi da Palestrina and Giovanni Animuccia. Dorico pioneered the use of a single impression printing process first developed in England and France. The iPad version was released on 28 July 2021, offering most of the functionality of the desktop app. It was the first major desktop scorewriter application to be made available on a mobile platform, however Sibelius also offers a mobile version.

In August 2024, when the rival scoring software Finale was shuttered after 35 years, the president of Finale, Greg Dell'Era recommended switching to Dorico, saying it is the "new future of the industry... Many have competed with Finale over the past four decades... but when Dorico launched in 2016, it set a brand new bar for the industry".

== Features ==
Dorico is known for its stability and reliability in creating aesthetically pleasing scores in addition to its intuitive interface. User feedback influences Dorico's feature design, and the development team actively use the forum and Facebook group.

=== Automation ===
Reviews have claimed that Dorico has become more efficient than other notation software. For example, a signature time-saving feature is its automatic creation of instrumental part layouts. Another signature feature is its automated condensing, where it combines multiple players' parts onto a single staff, such as for a conductor's score.

=== Keyboard input ===
Dorico natively supports note input entirely from the computer keyboard without the need to use a mouse or trackpad. It supports MIDI input from a piano keyboard.

=== SMuFL music fonts ===
The Standard Music Font Layout (SMuFL) standard was created by the Dorico development team at Steinberg. It provides a consistent standard way of mapping the thousands of musical symbols required by conventional music notation into a single font that can be used by a variety of software and font designers. It was first implemented in MuseScore, then in Dorico's first release and in Finale.

== Version history ==
Version	Released	Description	Ref
6.2.10	31 March 2026	Bug fixes	
6.2	10 March 2026	Repeats, guitar tablature, harmonics, engraving and workflow improvements	
6.1.10	13 October 2025	Bug fixes	
6.1	1 October 2025	Etude Elements now included, condensing and proofreading improvements	
6.0.20	2 July 2025	Bug fixes	
6.0.10	28 May 2025	Bug fixes	
6.0	30 April 2025	New proofreading panel, Cutaway scores, Cycle playback, Rulers and grid in Engrave Mode, Flow heading overrides, ability to create own custom Chord Symbols, Multiple Rows of Chord Symbols with extender lines, Fill View, more control over system-attached items, new OpenType features; condensing now works for doubling instruments	
5.1.80	15 January 2025	VST plug-in scanning	
5.1.70	20 November 2024	Note input and MusicXML import fixes	
5.1.60	9 October 2024	Pitch before duration input and performance improvements	
5.1.51	7 August 2024	Bug fixes	
5.1.40	29 May 2024	Contextual help	
5.1.30	3 April 2024	Bug fixes; new right-click menu for the status bar, support for custom "infix" characters for rehearsal marks, new option to consistently show bar rests in percussion kits if the bar contains only notes, ability to adjust lyrics vertically in Engrave mode in more circumstances than before	
5.1.20	21 February 2024	Spacing and workflow improvements	
5.1.10	18 January 2024	Bug fixes	
5.1	18 December 2023	New Iconica Sketch sounds	
5.0.20	6 July 2023	Bug fixes	
5.0.10	31 May 2023	Bug fixes	
5.0	24 May 2023	Improvements across the whole application, particularly relating to human-sounding playback, note input, MusicXML support; more music fonts from which to choose	
4.3.30	22 March 2023	Bug fixes, especially for HALion 7 and Media Bay integration	
4.3.20	15 February 2023	Note names shown in Key Editor, ability to specify transpositions for instruments in MIDI import, more support for customizing rehearsal mark formatting	
4.3.11	6 December 2022	Bug fixes; Key Editor improvements	
4.3	15 November 2022	Automatic voicing in notation from chord symbols, DAW-like layout and capabilities in Key Editor mode including ability to show multiple instruments and/or multiple MIDI (CC, Velocity, etc.) views, split notes command, hide notehead engraving property, Play menu available in all modes (previously only Play mode), Keyboard view animated with playback	
4.2	13 July 2022	Reintroduces Percussion editor with improvements to multiple instruments in a percussion kit, simplification of Linked Mode for Key Editor in Write mode, support for copy and paste of Expression and CC for MIDI channels	
4.1.10	22 June 2022	Bug fixes	
4.1	1 June 2022	Reintroduces dynamics editor to Key Editor and improvements to MIDI continuous controller editor; improvements to lyrics input, editing, and font handling; custom colors for layouts, voices, etc.; better support for printing flows	
4.0.31	24 March 2022	"Hotfix" bug fix for 4.0.30 release	
4.0.30	23 March 2022	Restores Tempo Editor to Play Mode, improves Staff labels, fixes for large sets of VSTs	
4.0.20	9 March 2022	Key Editor improvements, Spotlight and Quick Look integration on macOS, misc. new engraving and layout options	
4.0.10	2 February 2022	Bug fixes	
4.0	12 January 2022	Integrated Dorico’s DAW-like Key Editor feature into its Write Mode, fully reimplemented Play Mode (with some feature gaps compared to previous Play Mode), new scopes for Insert Mode, melodic and rhythmic transformations, improvements to transcriptions of MIDI import with workflows for DAW-based compositions, new Library Manager with ability to import and export settings between projects, new Jump Bar tool for accessing any command from a single entry point, adopting new Steinberg Licenser system, instrument filters in galley view, automatic instrument ordering per standard orders	
3.5.12	14 February 2021	Dorico 3.5.12 added official supported for use on Mac computers using Apple Silicon processor architecture.	
3.5.10	27 July 2020	Improvements made to Play mode, Setup mode, bar numbers, chord diagrams, condensing, expression maps, figured bass, lines, markers, mixer, music symbols, ornaments, pitch before duration input, playback options, playback templates, playing techniques, rehearsal marks, staff labels, tablature, tempo, text, and user interface	
3.5.0	20 May 2020	Pitch before duration in note input; enhanced expression maps; line style editors; figured bass support; condensing for divisi and section players; properties filter; manual staff visibility changes; clef and transposition overrides; use chord diagrams grid; graphic slices; making part-scores in Hollywood style; blank staves support, etc.	
3.0	2 September 2019	New condensing feature, full support for guitar notation and harp pedaling, custom playback templates, independent voice playback, velocity and pitch bend editing, Soundiron Olympus Choir Micro choral sound library, Comments feature, harmonics, grouped playing techniques, and multiple-stave entry; improvements to arpeggio signs, auto-save, bar numbers, chord symbols, clefs, dynamics, fingering, glissando lines, lyrics, multi-bar rests, navigation, note input, ossias, page layout, playback, print mode, project info, staff labels, tempo, text, trills, VST expression maps, user interface, installation and licensing, and platform support	
2.2	23 November 2018	Features improved or added include MIDI recording, repeat markers, jazz articulations, tempo track import/export, flow headings, tacets, trills, staff brackets, and an editor for all music symbols	
2.1	10 August 2018	Swing playback, Notehead Editor; improvements to audio export, accidentals, barlines, chord symbols, cues, divisi labelling, filters, flows, layouts, playback, rhythm slashes, staff labels, and video	
2.0	30 May 2018	Support for composing to video, a range of time signature styles, MIDI automation, divisi staves, ossias, additional staves for instruments, rhythmic slashes, bar repeats, playback techniques editor, the inclusion of Petaluma handwritten music font, and support for NotePerformer. Many productivity enhancements and minor additions were also added	
1.2	1 December 2017	Added support for fingering and unpitched percussion notation; improvements made to importing MIDI and MusicXML files, Play mode, Engrave mode, Print mode, articulations, barlines, bar numbers, chord symbols, clefs, dynamics, filters, flows, glissando lines, instrument changes, multi-bar rests, noteheads, note input, ornaments, page layout, pedal lines, playing techniques, rehearsal marks, rest grouping, scaling, slurs, staff labels, stems, tempo text, ties, time signatures, tuplets, user interface, performance, and localization	
1.1	June 2017	New features include chord symbols, support for MIDI output devices, enharmonic spelling during MIDI step input, piano pedal lines, repeat endings, filters, casting off, added fonts, MusicXML import, tokens, troubleshooting; improvements made to editing in Write mode, Play mode, Engrave mode, flows, MIDI import, key commands, editing note spacing, accidentals, arpeggio signs, barlines, beams, brackets and braces, clefs, copy and paste, dynamics, fonts, font styles, instrument changes, key signatures, lyrics, navigation, note input, note spacing, option dialogs, ornaments, page layout, playback, playing techniques, rests, selections, slurs, staff labels, staves, text, time signatures, tuplets, voices, user interface, performance, and installation	
1.0.0	19 October 2016	Initial release version	
