= NoteWorthy Composer =

Music notation software

- Developer: NoteWorthy Software
- Release: October 1994; 32 years ago
- Stable release: 2.75a.2 / 2017
- Operating system: Windows 95 ~ Windows 11
- Available in: English
- Website: noteworthycomposer.com

NoteWorthy Composer (NWC) is a proprietary scorewriter application made by NoteWorthy Software. It is a graphical score editor for Microsoft Windows computers. Version 1 of NWC was released in October 1994, and Version 2 in September 2008.

NWC is intended for the real-time visual creation of sheet music, but it can also import and export MIDI and Karaoke files and can export graphical WMFs. The user interface works either from the keyboard or the mouse. Notes can also be entered by playing on a MIDI device, when configured. In version 2, the notes can be heard as they are entered. Lyrics are entered as a single block of text which automatically positions itself on notes according to syllabic and slur rules, as opposed to being entered per-note.

The binary NWC file format is undocumented, and facilities to convert it into more popular formats that are less limited. There are a couple of open-source libraries that can convert this file format. Version 2 of NWC introduced a textual representation of the file format called NWCTXT. This allowed easier conversion to many other formats, including LilyPond.

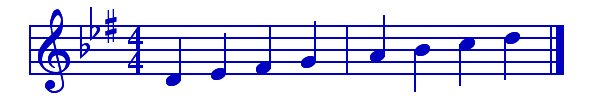
Noteworthy's rendering of a D Freygish scale

A feature of the user interface is that notation is displayed during editing. Each staff proceeds linearly from left to right without being wrapped around the screen. Staff systems are visually broken to fit margins during page layout, allowing many possibilities at "print time", when parts and scores can be laid out. On older hardware, this presents performance advantages over the WYSIWYG behavior of other editors because it minimizes the necessary rendering of particularly large scores. A print preview is available for adjustments to page layout since version 2.51.

The program lacks engraving, graphic sophistication, playback and publishing capabilities. A free viewer is available. The demo version imposes a limit of 10 saves per file name, adds a small footer to each printed page, and prints a registration form with each printed score. Besides the demo program, a downloadable plug-in for Winamp allows Winamp to play files from NWC.

Because of the availability of a free viewer, Noteworthy has been adopted as the standard score distribution format by the large hymn database, Hymnary.org. An "unofficial" catalog of composition files contributed by users is available from the NoteWorthy Scriptorium.

There have been no new software releases or updates for NoteWorthy Composer since 2017, nor updates on the official NoteWorthy Composer blog since 2015. The Noteworthy Composer Forum continues to be active (July 2022).

== See also ==
- List of scorewriters
- List of music software
