= Percussion notation =

Musical notation for percussive instruments

Percussion notation is a type of musical notation indicating notes to be played by percussion instruments. As with other forms of musical notation, sounds are represented by symbols which are usually written onto a musical staff (or stave).

Percussion instruments are generally grouped into two categories: pitched and non-pitched. The notation of non-pitched percussion instruments is less standardized, and therefore often includes a key or legend specifying which line or space each individual instrument will be notated on.

Cymbals are usually notated with 'x' note heads, drums with normal elliptical note heads and auxiliary percussion with alternative note heads. Non-pitched percussion notation on a conventional staff once commonly employed the bass clef, but the neutral clef (or "percussion clef"), consisting of two parallel vertical lines, is usually preferred now. It is usual to label each instrument and technique the first time it is introduced, or to add an explanatory footnote, to clarify this. Sometimes unconventional staves are used to clarify notation, for example a 2-, 3-, or 4- line stave may be used where each line refers to a differently pitched instrument, such as temple blocks or tom-toms, or a single line stave may be used for a single non-pitched instrument such as a tambourine.

== Key or legend for drum kit ==
Each line and space of the staff is assigned a different part or "voice" of the drum kit, and these assignments are often laid out at the beginning of a piece of music in what is known as a key or legend. Occasionally, there is no legend, and each voice is labeled the first time it appears in the piece.

Below are two examples of drum legends as they would appear in the music:

Example 1: (Less common)

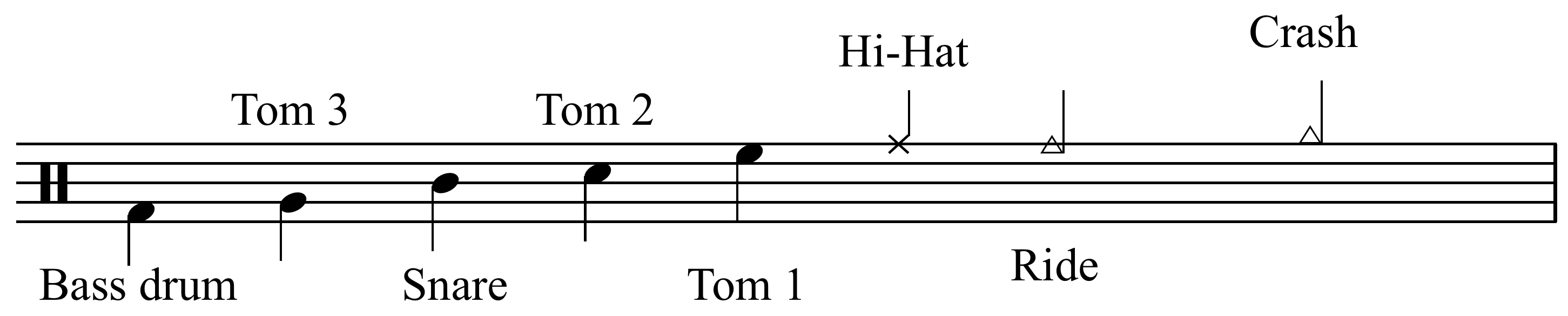

Example 2:

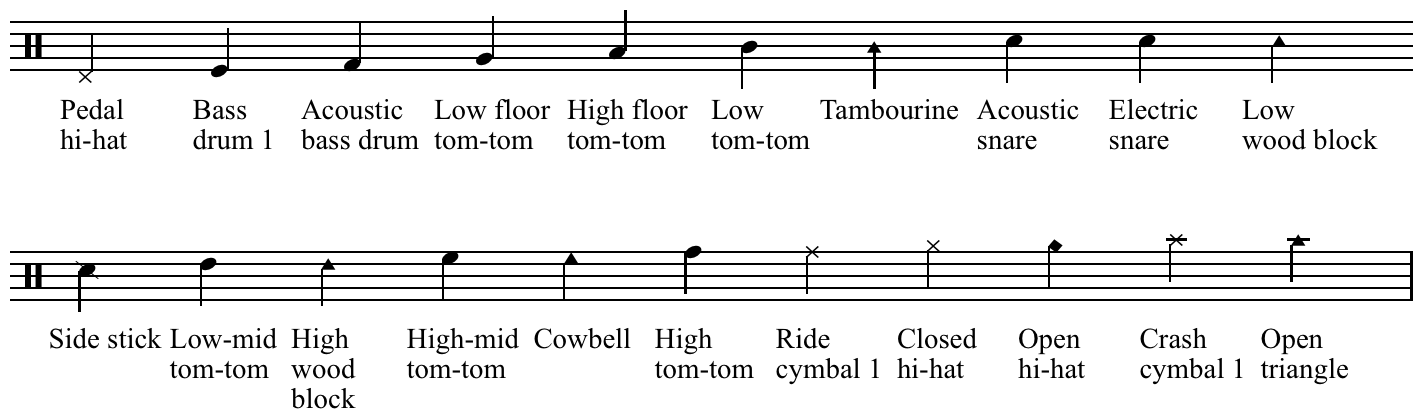

The above system is based on the recommendations of the Percussive Arts Society

Another example of a fairly standard drum kit:

Drum kit#Five-piece:

Extended to six toms:

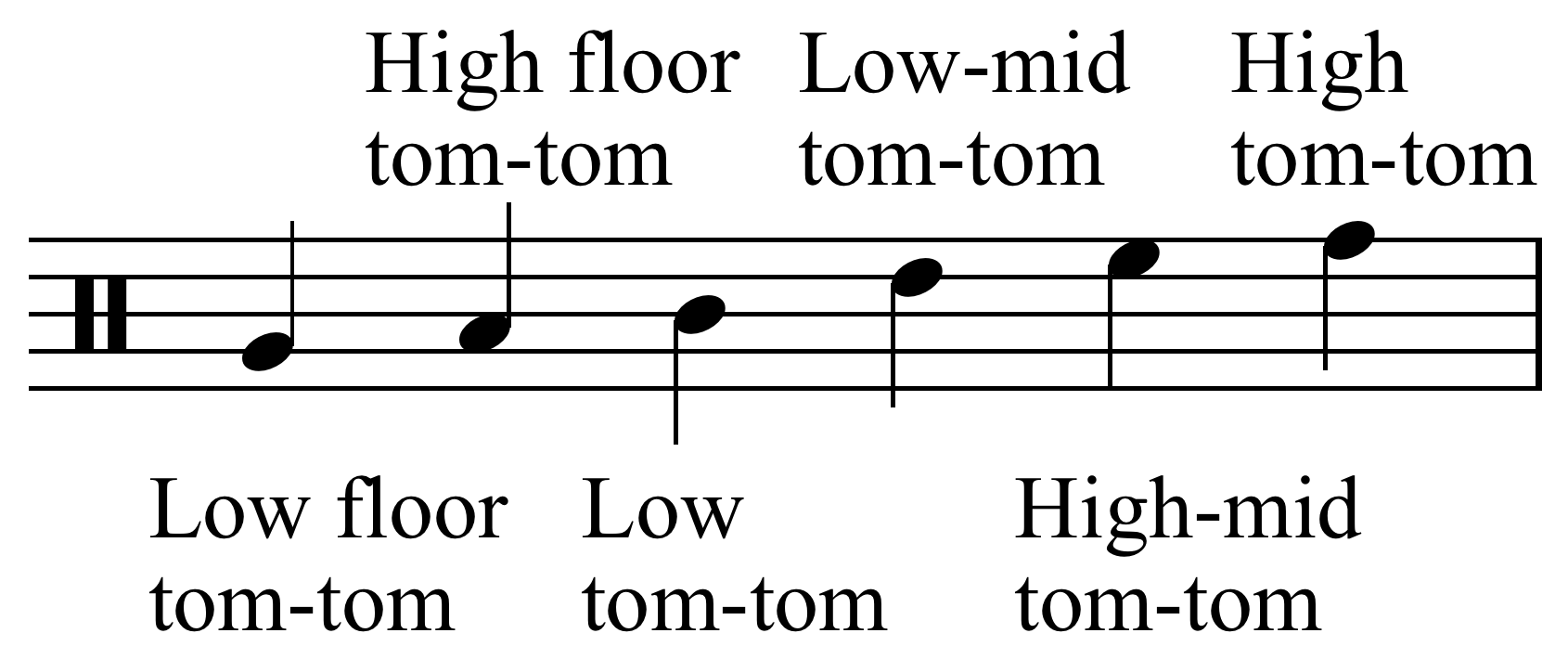

Cymbals:

Other:

Mounted triangle: ledger-line high C with "x" replacing notehead. Maraca: high-B with "+" replacing notehead. Mounted tambourine: high-B with "x" through conventional notehead.

== Specifying percussion techniques ==
All note letter-names in this section refer to the bass clef; the notes remain in the same physical locations when the neutral clef is used.

Rolls: Diagonal lines across the note stem (or above a whole note). Usually three diagonal lines denote a roll, whereas fewer would be interpreted as measured subdivisions of the note (two lines for sixteenths, one for eighths).

Open hi-hat: X notehead in the hi-hat part with small o above.

Closed hi-hat: X notehead in the hi-hat part with + above.

Cross Stick: X notehead in the snare drum part.

Rim Shot: diagonal slash through note head.

Brush sweep: horizontal-line notehead, with a slur mark added to show that the brush is not lifted. (Together, the horizontal-line notehead and its stem look rather like a long "T" or a long inverted "T", depending which way the stem is going.)

== Dynamic accents ==

In percussion notation, accents are almost always to be interpreted as dynamic accents. Typically this involves emphasizing the accented note simply by raising the dynamic level. The meanings of the different types of accents are not entirely standard. The image above shows the accent notations most commonly used by composers of percussion music. The tenuto sign is often used to indicate an only slightly raised dynamic level, less than a normal accent. Marcato signs typically indicate a dramatically raised dynamic level. These markings, especially the tenuto sign, often have different meanings in the musical notation for other instruments.

== Anti-accents ==
1. slightly softer than surrounding notes: ˘ (breve above or below—inverted—notehead)
2. significantly softer than surrounding notes: ( ) (note head in parentheses)
3. much softer than surrounding notes: [ ] (note head in brackets)

(Ghost note is a less formal alternative term which may refer either to anti-accentuation in general or to a particular degree of anti-accentuation. Ghost notes are often considered to be especially faint.)

== See also ==
- Drum tablature
