= Music Publishers Association =

- Founded: 1895; 130 years ago
- Type: Trade association
- Headquarters: New York City, US
- Location: United States
- President: Steven Lankenau
- Affiliations: American Society of Composers, Authors and Publishers; Broadcast Music, Inc.; Harry Fox Agency; National Music Publishers' Association; SESAC
- Website: www.mpa.org

The Music Publishers Association of the United States (MPA) is a non-profit music publishing organization based in New York City. Founded in 1895, the MPA is the oldest music trade organization in the United States which addresses issues pertaining to print publishing with an emphasis on copyright education and advocacy.

== Tab and lyric sites ==
The MPA asserts that websites offering lyrics and guitar tabs without licenses from the music publisher or songwriters constitutes copyright infringement. Former MPA president Lauren Keiser stated that he wanted jail time in addition to fines and the removal of offending websites.

In March 2006, the MPA issued a statement in which they explained their position on websites that distribute unauthorized sheet music and tablature.

Several points are made in the statement:

- MPA members invest a significant amount into arranging, engraving, editing, marketing, and distributing sheet music products, and illegal tablature cuts into their sales.
- Sharing the tabs is bad enough, but even worse is when sites make money off the illegal tabs.
- Guitar tabs do not circumvent copyright laws just because they're claimed to be personal interpretations.
- Viewing illegal tabs is equivalent to stealing sheet music from a local music store.
- The MPA is not targeting authorized websites, and will work with sites that want to build a legitimate business.

== Criticism ==
The MPA's position on tablature has been criticized by the tabbing community. The community do not believe they are infringing copyright laws because they are only displaying their aural transcriptions of these songs, which are, more often than not, not entirely correct. They feel that the practice of tabbing and sharing songs has existed for decades without any issues. An article on the now-closed guitartabs.cc website said:

"At what point does describing how one plays a song on guitar become an issue of copyright infringment [sic]? This website [and tablatures], among other things, helps users teach each other how they play guitar parts for many different songs. This is the way music teachers have behaved since the first music was ever created. The difference here is that the information is shared by way of a new technology: the Internet ..."

In April 2008, the Power Tab Archive, a popular guitar tablature site based around the Power Tab Editor program, was urged to properly license work by the MPA. In April 2009, the Power Tab Archive organized a partnership with Music Sales Group and the website is continuing to reload the downloads and pays royalties with advertising revenue.
