= Volume swell =

Type of musical crescendo

Volume swell on electric guitar with a volume pedal and a distorted amp, delay and reverb, creating a violin-like tone (also known as violining).

A volume swell is a musical crescendo commonly associated with the electric guitar. It is achieved by cutting the initial attack of the note, either with the volume potentiometer on the guitar or with a volume pedal.

== Principle ==
Roughly speaking, the sound of a guitar note is characterized by an initial 'attack' where the pick or finger produces higher pitched overtones over the top of the fundamental note, followed by a diminution of these overtones. Consequently, the end of the note is softer than the attack. Volume swells alter the tone of the note, reducing the treble tones of the attack and allowing the softer tone that follows to sustain.

The technique is often executed using the guitar's volume knob. Beginning with the knob turned down to zero, it is increased when a note is played. The effect can also be performed by using a volume pedal. It is sometimes called "violining", because the sound is similar to a bowed violin. Volume swells can be used in conjunction to bending in order to make it sound like a human voice raising in pitch and volume.

Allan Holdsworth pioneered the technique of the pedal swelling along with a delay unit to create a thicker sound that is more associated with the cello.

== Notable users ==
Jeff Beck used volume swells throughout his career, an example being "Where Were You" from his 1989 album Jeff Beck's Guitar Shop.

George Harrison used a volume pedal on the Beatles' songs "I Need You", "Yes It Is", and "Wait".

Ritchie Blackmore used the volume knob technique live with both Deep Purple and Rainbow, and there are a few recorded studio examples, such as "Lalena" on the album Deep Purple in 1969, "Fools" from Fireball in 1971, and "Mistreated" from Burn in 1974

Roy Buchanan was famous for his emotive volume swells, often in combination with note bending and vibrato. Jan Akkerman used the technique with Focus, as did Phil Keaggy with Glass Harp, and Dickey Betts with the Allman Brothers Band's first few albums.

Steve Hackett used guitar swells often with Genesis, such as on the song "Hairless Heart" from the 1974 album The Lamb Lies Down on Broadway.

Van Halen's 1982 album Diver Down includes the instrumental "Cathedral", a guitar solo by Eddie Van Halen played entirely using volume swells.

Night Ranger guitarist Brad Gillis uses the effect for the main melody of "Rumours in the Air" from their 1983 second album Midnight Madness.

Tool's 2019 album Fear Inoculum begins with Adam Jones using volume swells to achieve a machinelike sound.
