= Pick slide =

Guitar technique

Pick slide technique example

A pick slide or pick scrape is a guitar technique most often performed in the rock, punk or metal music genres. The technique is executed by holding the edge of the pick against any of the three or four wound strings and moving it along the string. As the pick moves across the string, the edge of the pick catches the string's windings in rapid succession causing the string to vibrate and produce a note. This rapid rattling of the pick's edge against the windings also gives the resulting note a grinding or grating quality.

The pitch of a pick slide rises as the pick moves closer to the bridge, and lowers as the pick moves up to the neck. Since pick slides usually start near the bridge and end over the higher frets, these slides have a characteristic of gradually lowering the pitch. A pick slide causes little – if any – damage to the strings, pickups or guitar, but it does ruin the edge of the pick; thinner picks made of more durable materials are the best choice for the technique.
