= Tablature =

Form of musical notation

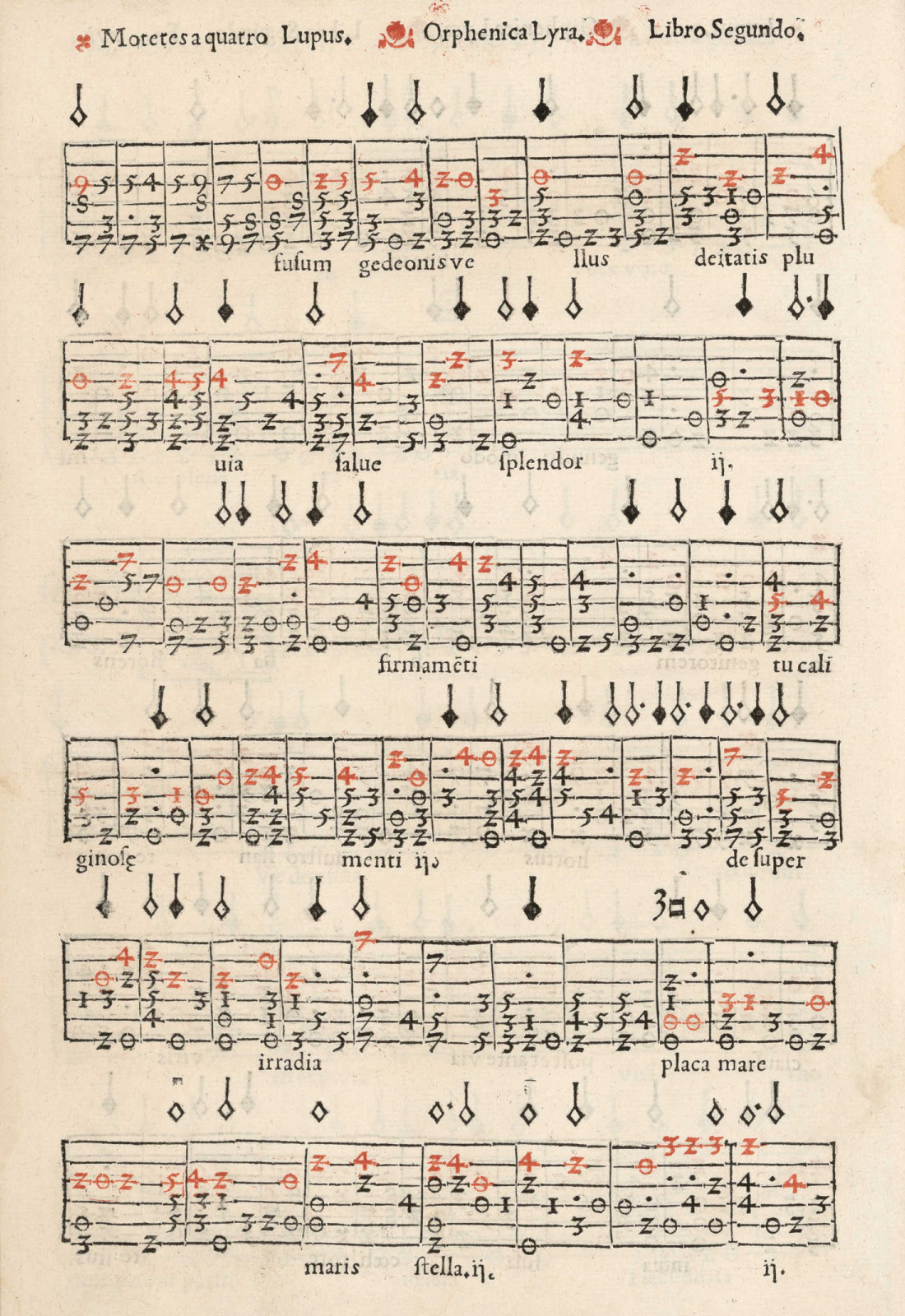
Example of numeric vihuela tablature from the book "Orphenica Lyra" by Miguel de Fuenllana (1554). Red numerals (original) mark the vocal part.

Tablature (or tab for short) is a form of musical notation indicating instrument fingering or the location of the played notes rather than musical pitches.

Tablature is used for certain fretted stringed instruments such as the steel-string or electric guitar, lute or vihuela, as well as for certain free reed aerophones such as the harmonica. Tablature was common during the Renaissance and Baroque eras, and is often, but not exclusively, used today, in addition to standard notation, for notating rock-era pop music.

Three types of organ tablature were used in Europe: German, Spanish and Italian.

To distinguish standard musical notation from tablature, the former can also be called standard notation, staff notation, or just notation.

== Etymology ==
The word tablature originates from the Latin word tabulatura. Tabula is a table or slate, in Latin. To tabulate something means to put it into a table or chart.

== History ==
Organ tablature is the first known tablature in Europe, used for notating music for the pipe organ around 1300.

== Concepts ==
While standard notation represents the rhythm and duration of each note and its pitch relative to the scale based on a twelve tone division of the octave, tablature is instead operationally based, indicating where and when a finger should be placed to generate a note, so pitch is denoted implicitly rather than explicitly. Tablature for plucked strings is based upon a diagrammatic representation of the strings and frets of the instrument, keyboard tablature represents the keys of the instrument, and woodwind tablature shows whether each of the fingerholes is to be closed or left open.

== Types of tablature ==
=== Guitar and bass tablature ===
Guitar tablature is used for acoustic and electric guitar (typically with 6 strings). A modified guitar tablature with four strings is used for bass guitar. Guitar and bass tab is used in pop, rock, folk, and country music lead sheets, fake books, and songbooks, and it also appears in instructional books and websites. Tab may be given as the only notation (as with chord tab in songbooks that only include lyrics and chords), or, as with guitar solo transcriptions, tab and standard notation may be provided. Sheet music consisting of tablature is sometimes referred to as "tabs." The same style of tablature is also used for other fretted instruments such as the banjo, mandolin, and ukulele.

The following examples are labelled with letters on the left denoting the string names, with a lowercase e for the high E string. Tab lines may be numbered 1 through 6 instead, representing standard string numbering, where "1" is the high E string, "2" is the B string, etc. Also, the order of lines is not standardized. Some tablature is written in pitch order, with the high "e" string on top, and descending in pitch order to the low "E" string on the bottom. Other tablature is written the other way, with the string closest to the ceiling (the low "E") on top and the one closest to the floor (the high "e") on the bottom. To avoid confusion, tablature writers will often write the pitches to the left of the tablature so the reader knows the convention being used.

The numbers that are written on the lines represent the fret used to obtain the desired pitch. For example, the number 3 written on the top line of the staff indicates that the player should press down at the third fret on the high E (first string). Number 0 denotes the nut — that is, an open string. If music is to be played using a capo, the numbers always indicate the number of frets from the capo, and not from the nut (thus, it is transposed into the capoed key). For chords, a letter above or below the tablature staff denotes the root note of the chord, chord notation is also usually relative to a capo, so chords played with a capo are transposed. Chords may also be notated with chord diagrams.

Examples of guitar tablature notation:

The chords E, F, and G as an ASCII tab:

e|---0---1---3---
B|---0---1---0---
G|---1---2---0---
D|---2---3---0---
A|---2---3---2---
E|---0---1---3---
     E   F   G

Tablature for guitar in standard tuning shown underneath standard notation.

Tablature can use various lines, arrows, and other symbols to denote various legato techniques, such as bends, hammer-ons, trills, pull-offs, slides, and so on. Common tablature symbols represent various techniques, though these may vary, include:

Symbol	Technique
h	hammer on
p	pull off
b	bend string up
r	release bend
/	slide up
\	slide down
v	vibrato (sometimes written as ~)
t	right hand tap
s	legato slide
S	shift slide
*	natural harmonic
[n]	artificial harmonic
n(n)	tapped harmonic
tr	trill
T	tap
TP	tremolo picking
PM	palm muting (also written as _ and .)
N.C.	No chord: tacet or rest
\n/	tremolo arm dip; n = amount to dip
\n	tremolo arm down
n/	tremolo arm up
/n\	tremolo arm inverted dip
=	hold bend; also acts as connecting device for hammers/pulls
<>	volume swell (louder/softer)
x	on rhythm slash represents muted slash
o	on rhythm slash represents single note slash
·/.	pick slide

Further symbols to indicate note lengths may be used along the top of the tablature, examples include:

Symbol	Note Length
W	Whole note/semibreve
H	Half note/minim
Q	Quarter note/crotchet
E	Eighth note/quaver
a	Acciaccatura
-	Note tied to previous
.	Note dotted

Guitar tablature is not standardized and different sheet-music publishers adopt different conventions. Songbooks and guitar magazines usually include a legend setting out the convention in use.

The most common form of lute tablature uses the same concept but differs in the details (e.g., it uses letters rather than numbers for frets). See above.

When circles are used to indicate fingering, sounded notes are white, an assumed root is grey, and a sounded root is black.

=== French lute tablature ===
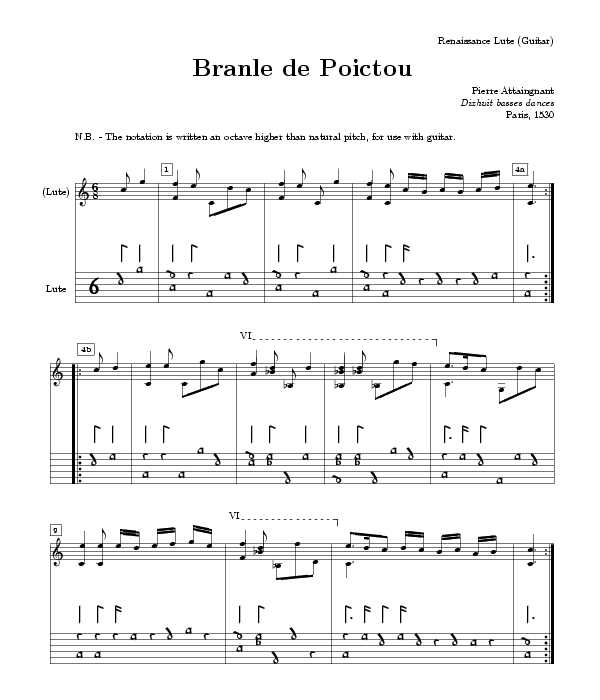
French Renaissance style lute tablature, with corresponding notation for guitar (with capo on third fret or tuned up a minor third): a simple Renaissance dance, printed by Pierre Attaingnant.

Tuning

F____________________
D____________________
A____________________
F____________________
D____________________
A____________________

Lowercase letters or "glyphs" are placed on each of these lines to represent notes. If it is required to play an open D course, for instance, a small a will be placed on the appropriate line. For a note with the finger on the first fret a b, a note on the second fret a c, etc. However, as mentioned above, j was not used since it was not considered a separate letter from i, and c often looked more like r or the third letter of the Greek alphabet, Γ (gamma). Thus:

F_____c___
D_____a___
A_____b___
F_____c___
D_____a___
A_____b___
G - a

would represent a G-minor chord (on a Baroque lute in D-minor tuning),

All open strings would represent a D-minor chord:

F______a________
D______a________
A______a________
F______a________
D______a________
A______a________
D- ///a

The strings below the sixth course are notated with additional short ledger lines: glyphs are placed below the staff. These courses are tuned in accordance with the key of each piece played:

G- a
F- /a
E- //a
D- ///a
C- 4
B- 5
A- 6

=== German lute tablature ===
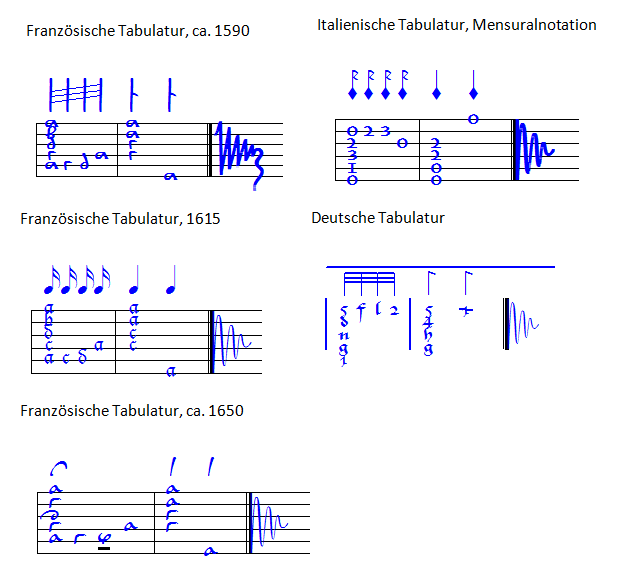
Types of lute tablatures

The origins of German lute tablature can be traced back well into the 15th century. Blind organist Conrad Paumann is said to have invented it. It was used in German-speaking countries until the end of the 16th century.

== Computer programs for writing tablatures ==
Various computer programs are available for writing tablature; some also write lyrics, guitar chord diagrams, chord symbols, and/or staff notation. ASCII tab files can be written (somewhat laboriously) with any ordinary word processor or text editor, using a monospaced font such as 'Courier New' so that characters maintain vertical alignment across all strings.

== Legal issues ==
By early 2006, an unprecedented legal move was taken by the Music Publishers Association (MPA), initiating the removal of unlicensed guitar tablature from websites. The MPA had been pushing for websites offering free tablature to license or be shut down. MPA president Lauren Keiser said that their goal is for owners of free tablature services to face fines and even imprisonment. Several websites that offered free tablature have taken their tablature off-line until a solution or compromise is found. One of the proposed solutions is an alternative compensation system, which allows the widespread reproduction of digital copyrighted works while still paying songwriters and copyright owners. In addition, there are now a number of "legal" services offering guitar tablature that have been licensed by music publishers.

One site, MetalTabs.com, contacts the bands themselves for permission to post tablature. Few bands have declined the request.

The tablature debate was featured on NPR's Morning Edition in a segment entitled "Music Industry Goes after Guitar Tablature Websites" on 7 August 2006.

On 10 April 2010, Ultimate Guitar (UG), a Russian free tablature website, entered a licensing agreement with Harry Fox Agency. The agreement included rights for lyrics display, title search and tablature display with download and print capabilities. HFA's over 44,000 represented publishers have the opportunity to opt into the licensing arrangement with UG.

=== Rise of legal guitar tablature sites ===
In light of the legal questions surrounding user-created online guitar tablature, a number of companies have been formed that claim to offer consumers legal online tablature, which has been officially licensed from songwriters and/or music publishers. These companies offering legal content generally fall into three categories:

- Websites that offer "professionally-created" content: These websites typically hire professional musicians to transcribe songs into guitar tablature, and generally charge anywhere from $0.99 to $6.99 for the ability to purchase legal pieces of guitar tablature. These websites also claim to have acquired the proper licenses to display this tablature online. Several websites in this first category specifically cater to guitarists.
- Websites that offer "user-created" tablature, but have obtained the proper legal clearances to post these transcriptions online. There are several websites that fall into this second category, which generally do not charge consumers for using these user-created tablature pieces, and share any advertising revenue with music publishers and/or songwriters.
- Websites that index other tablature resources, and offer unique formatting options.

=== Mxtabs.net ===
Mxtabs.net closed because of copyright-holder complaints. However, as of 23 February 2006, the owners of Mxtabs put the website back online with a letter explaining their position. In short, they believe that the purpose of Mxtabs is to "...aid musicians in learning their instruments." They claim that Mxtabs has accounted for as much as $3,000 a month in sheet music sales, and offers many tablatures that are not published in sheet music, so Mxtabs and similar sites are the only place that musicians can find a way to play these songs (other than figuring the songs out for themselves). The letter concludes by pointing out that nobody has shown that tablature renditions are illegal, then requesting that sheet-music companies contact Mxtabs to create a system of tablature licensing.

On 29 February 2008, MXTabs.net relaunched as the first legitimately licensed site designed to provide musicians with access to free tablatures, while also compensating music publishers and songwriters for their intellectual property. As with other user generated content sites, MXTabs.net users are encouraged to create, edit, rate, and review their own tablature interpretations of their favourite songs. However, unlike other user-generated content sites, only songs that have received explicit permission from participating copyright owners will be made available online.

=== Guitar Tab Universe ===
On 17 July 2006, Guitar Tab Universe (GTU) posted a letter on its home page that its ISP had been jointly threatened with legal action by the National Music Publishers Association (NMPA) and the MPA "on the basis that sharing tablature constitutes copyright infringement".

In response, GTU's site owner(s) immediately created a website named Music Student and Teacher Organization (MuSATO) to attempt to reposition themselves from an illegal-copyrighted-materials provider to an "education provider". MuSATO's main objective is to use fair use as their rationale to publish tablature free of charge. By claiming to be an educational provider, they do not have to obtain publication rights or pay royalties to the original composers. MuSATO claims to be educational by classifying users downloading tablatures as "music students" and transcribers as "music teachers".

GuitarTabs.com has been contacted by the NMPA and MPA with similar copyright infringement allegations. The NMPA and MPA have also threatened Guitar Tab Universe with similar legal action. A copy of the certified letter received by the site owner, along with a brief note similar to the one posted on Mxtabs, has been posted on their website.

=== OLGA.net ===
The On-line Guitar Archive (OLGA) is another tablature site that has been removed after receiving letters from lawyers representing the NMPA and the MPA.

== See also ==
- ASCII tab – Musical notation file format
- Digital sheet music – Full musical score showing each part on a separate line or staff
- Drum tablature – Simplified percussion notation
- Fret – Bar across the neck of stringed instruments
- Keyboard tablature – Form of musical notation for keyboard instruments
- Klavar notation – Music notation system
- Kunkunshi – Music notation system in Japan's Ryukyu Islands
- Musical notation – Visual representation of music
- Shamisen – Japanese plucked stringed instrument
