= Sibelius (scorewriter) =

Music notation software

- Sibelius, running on macOS, with the sheet music to Scriabin's Piano Sonata No. 5
- Original authors: Ben Finn; Jonathan Finn
- Developer: Avid
- Release: April 1993; 33 years ago
- Stable release: 2026.2.1 (18 March 2026; 4 months ago) [±]
- Written in: C++
- Operating system: Microsoft Windows, macOS, RISC OS
- Available in: 9 languages
- List of languages: Chinese (Simplified); English; French; German; Italian; Japanese; Portuguese; Russian*; Spanish
- Type: Scorewriter
- License: Proprietary software (with limited freeware version)
- Website: www.avid.com/sibelius

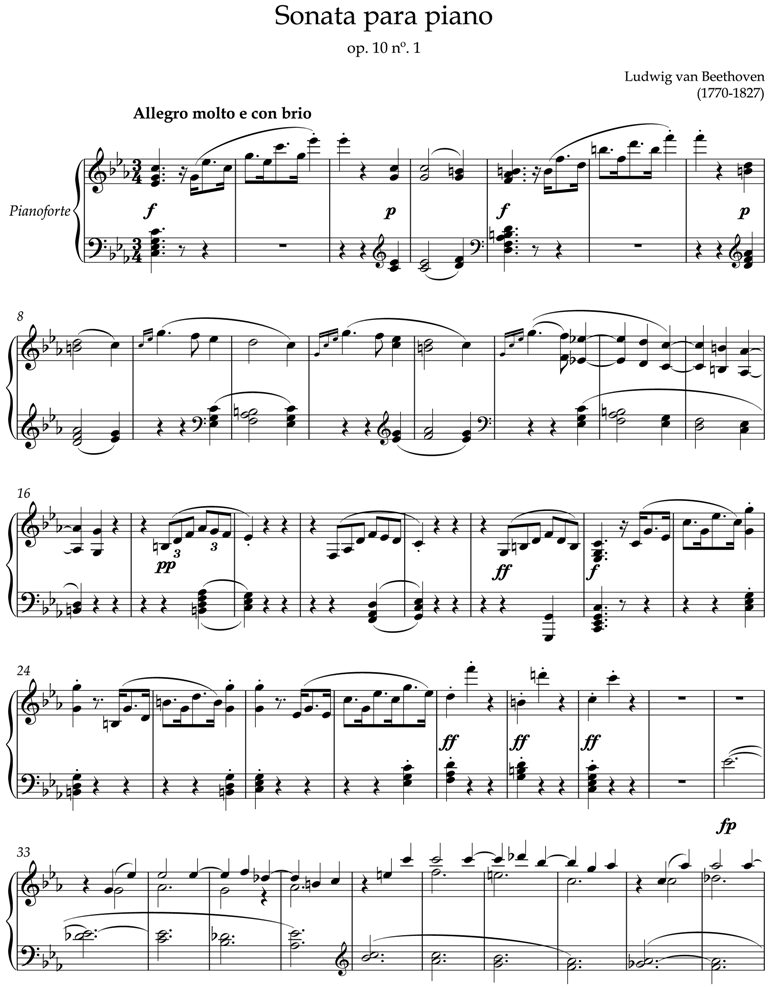
An example of sheet music created in Sibelius.

Sibelius is a scorewriter program developed and released by Sibelius Software (now part of Avid). Beyond creating, editing and printing music scores, it can also play the music back using sampled or synthesised sounds. It produces printed scores, and can also publish them via the Internet for others to access. Less advanced versions of Sibelius at lower prices have been released, as have various add-ons for the software.

Named after the Finnish composer Jean Sibelius, the company was founded in April 1993 by twin brothers Ben and Jonathan Finn to market the eponymous music notation program they had created. It went on to develop and distribute various other music software products, particularly for education. In addition to its head office in Cambridge and subsequently London, Sibelius Software opened offices in the US, Australia and Japan, with distributors and dealers in many other countries worldwide. The company won numerous awards, including the Queen's Award for Innovation in 2005.

In August 2006 the company was acquired by Avid, to become part of its Digidesign division, which also manufactures the digital audio workstation Pro Tools. In July 2012, Avid announced plans to divest its consumer businesses, closed the Sibelius London office, and removed the original development team, despite a 11,590-strong 'Save Sibelius' petition spearheading a campaign led by Derek Williams that included extensive protests on Facebook and elsewhere. Avid subsequently recruited new programmers to continue the development of Sibelius, and Steinberg hired most of the former Sibelius team to create a competing software, Dorico.

== History ==
=== Origins ===
Sibelius was originally developed by British twins Jonathan and Ben Finn for the Acorn Archimedes computer under the name 'Sibelius 7', not as a version number, but reminiscent of Sibelius' Symphony No 7. The Finns said they could not remember why they used Jean Sibelius' name, but it was probably because he was also 'a Finn' (i.e. Finnish), as well as being one of their favourite composers. They started developing the software (entirely in assembly language) in the summer of 1986, just after they left school, and continued while studying at Oxford and Cambridge universities, respectively. Both brothers were composers, and wrote the program to automate the laborious process of writing music out by hand.

The program was released to the public in April 1993 on 3.5-inch floppy disk. It required considerably less than 1 MB of memory (as its files only occupied a few KB per page of music), and the combination of assembly language and the Archimedes' ARM processor meant that it ran very quickly. No matter how long the score, changes were displayed almost instantly. A unique feature of the Sibelius GUI at that time was the ability it gave the user to drag the entire score around with the mouse, offering a bird's eye of the score, as distinct from having to use the QWERTY input keyboard arrow keys, or equivalent, to scroll the page.

The first ever user of Sibelius was the composer and engraver Richard Emsley, who provided advice on music engraving prior to the start of development, and beta tested the software before its release. The first concert performance from a Sibelius score was the premiere of Plus Loin for chamber orchestra by David Robert Coleman, copied by Emsley. The first score published using Sibelius was Antara by George Benjamin, also copied by Emsley, and published by Faber Music. Other early adopters included composer John Rutter, conductor Michael Tilson Thomas, and publisher Music Sales.

As a killer application for the niche Acorn platform, Sibelius rapidly dominated the UK market. It also sold in smaller numbers in a few other countries, restricted by the availability of Acorn computers. 'Lite' versions were subsequently released, and these were successful in UK schools, where Acorns were widely used.

=== Expansion ===
In September 1998, the first version for Windows was released as 'Sibelius', with the version number reset to 1.0. A Mac version 1.2 was released a few months later, and the company thereafter used conventional version numbers for both platforms across subsequent upgrades. The Windows and Mac versions were essentially identical, and scores created on one platform could be opened on the other. To produce these versions, the software was completely rewritten from scratch in C++, while retaining most of the original Acorn version's functionality and user interface, plus numerous enhancements. The original Acorn names 'Sibelius 6' and 'Sibelius 7' were later re-used to denote versions 6 and 7 of Sibelius for Windows/Mac.

Releasing Sibelius for more widely available computers brought it to a worldwide market, particularly the US, where Sibelius Software had opened an office in late 1996. Following the break-up of Acorn Computers shortly after Sibelius' Windows release, no further Acorn versions were developed. Sibelius Software later opened an office in Australia, also serving New Zealand, where Sibelius was widely used.

In August 2006, Sibelius Software Ltd was acquired by Avid Technology, an American manufacturer of software and hardware for audio and video production. Avid continued publishing Sibelius as a stand-alone notation product, as well as integrating it with some of its existing software products.

In July 2012, Avid announced plans to divest itself of its other consumer businesses, closed the Sibelius London office, and laid off the original development team, amid an outpouring of user protest, then recruited a new team of programmers to continue Sibelius development in Montreal, Canada and Kyiv, Ukraine.

=== Timeline ===
- 1986: Founders Jonathan and Ben Finn start developing Sibelius 7 for Acorn computers.
- 1993: Sibelius Software founded to sell Sibelius 7 and related computer hardware/software in the UK. Early customers include Europe's largest publisher Music Sales, choral composer John Rutter, and the Royal Academy of Music. Sibelius 6 (educational version) also launched.
- 1994: Distribution in Europe, Australia and New Zealand commences. Sibelius 7 Student (educational version) launched.
- 1995: German versions of Sibelius launched.
- 1996: US office opened in California. Junior Sibelius (primary school program) launched.
- 1998: Sibelius for Windows launched worldwide. Company ceases selling hardware to concentrate on core software business.
- 1999: Sibelius for Mac, PhotoScore and Scorch launched. Sibelius forms US subsidiary, creating the Sibelius Group, which now has 25 employees. Quester VCT invests.
- 2000: Sibelius Internet Edition launched, and adopted for Internet publishing by leading European publishers Music Sales and Boosey & Hawkes. SibeliusMusic.com and Sibelius Notes (initially called Teaching Tools) launched.
- 2001: World's largest sheet music publisher Hal Leonard also adopts Sibelius Internet Edition. Sibelius Group reaches 50 employees.
- 2002: Sibelius is first major music program for Mac OS X. Company acquires music software company MIDIworks.
- 2003: Starclass, Instruments, G7 and G7music.net launched. Sibelius Group commences distributing Musition and Auralia. Sibelius in Japanese launched, distributed by Yamaha.
- 2004: Compass, Kontakt Gold, Sibelius Student Edition, Sibelius in French and Spanish launched. Company acquires SequenceXtra. Sibelius software used in more than 50% of UK secondary schools.
- 2005: Australian subsidiary formed after acquiring Australian distributor. Company reaches 75 employees. Wins Queen's Award for Enterprise. Releases Rock & Pop Collection of sounds. Commences distributing O-Generator.
- 2006: Groovy Music and Coloured Keyboard launched. Sibelius Software bought by Avid Technology.
- 2007: Japanese office opened.
- 2012: Avid closes Sibelius' London office and lays off original development team, sparking the 'Save Sibelius' campaign.
- 2014: First release of a Sibelius version (7.5) by the new development team.
- 2018: Sibelius First (free, entry-level product), Sibelius (formerly Sibelius First) and Sibelius Ultimate (formerly Sibelius) launched together with a new year-based versioning system.
- 2021: Sibelius for iPad and iPhone is released.

== Features ==
=== Core functionality ===
Sibelius' main function is to help create, edit and print musical scores. It supports virtually all music notations, enabling even the most complex of modern orchestral, choral, jazz, pop, folk, rock and chamber music scores to be engraved to publication quality. Further, it allows scores to be played back or turned into MIDI or audio files, e.g. to create a CD. A built-in sample player and a large range of sampled sounds are included. It supports any MIDI device, and allows Virtual Studio Technology (VST) and Audio Units plug-ins to be used as playback instruments, giving users access to third-party sample libraries. Score playback can also be synchronised to video, or to DAW software via the ReWire standard.

By default, Sibelius plays a brief passage from a Jean Sibelius symphony as it launches, a feature that can be disabled in the application's Preferences if desired. Each version has used a different excerpt; e.g. Sibelius 7 appropriately uses the main theme from Sibelius' 7th Symphony.

In Version 7.0, Avid Technology rebuilt Sibelius as a 64-bit application, replacing the menu navigation system of previous versions with a Ribbon interface in the process. This met with considerable user resistance, however the Ribbon remains integral to the current GUI.

=== Add-ons ===
Add-ons for Sibelius that are currently or have previously been available include:

- Sound libraries such as NotePerformer, Vienna Symphonic Library, Spitfire Audio (samples of BBC Symphony Orchestra), Kontakt, Garritan, and Mark of the Unicorn's (MOTU) Symphonic Instrument, which can be added as Manual Sound Sets in the Playback Devices options from the Sibelius Play tab.
- Extra plug-in features. These are usually free of charge, and often created by Sibelius users, the most prolific of whom has been Bob Zawalich.
- Myriad's PDF to MusicXML transcribing application PDFtoMusic.
- Neuratron's Music OCR program PhotoScore (scanning), which can be used to scan and create a Sibelius score from printed music and PDF documents. A lite version is bundled with Sibelius.
- Neuratron's AudioScore, also bundled in a lite version, which claims to be able to turn singing or an acoustic instrument performance into a score, though many users have complained that this does not work. AudioScore currently holds a two-star rating on cnet.com.
- QWERTY Keyboards such as Logic Keyboard.
- Keyboard covers such as KB Covers.
- Mobile device VNC controllers such as iPad Sibelius Wizard and Sibelius Control for iPad, allowing the user to control Sibelius wirelessly via shortcuts set up within the Preferences.

=== Cloud publishing ===
Sibelius users can publish their scores directly from the software via the Internet using desktops, laptops or iPads. Anyone else using software called Sibelius Scorch (free for web browsers, charged for on iPads) can then view these scores, play them back, transpose them, change instruments, or print them from the web browser version. ScoreExchange.com is a website where any Sibelius user can upload scores they have composed, arranged or transcribed with Sibelius, so that anyone can access the music. The site began in 2001 as SibeliusMusic.com, and by June 2011 had amassed nearly 100,000 scores. The iPad version of Scorch also includes a store containing over 250,000 scores from publishers Music Sales, Hal Leonard, and Sibelius Scorch is used in the websites of various music publishers and individual musicians. Publishers can licence the Sibelius Internet Edition for commercial online publishing.

In October 2017, Scorch was replaced by Sibelius Cloud Publishing, providing publishers with an API to automate the publishing and selling of digital sheet Music. It uses the same technology as Scorch to allow Sibelius users to share music online directly from within the program, and addresses compatibility issues.

=== Education ===
There are various education-specific features for Sibelius' large market of schools and universities. The Sibelius Educational Suite includes extensive built-in music teaching materials, and the ability to run and manage multiple copies of the software on a network at discounted educational pricing.

In 2012, Sibelius Student was replaced by a new version of Sibelius First.

Lite notation based on Sibelius is included in Avid's Pro Tools audio editing software.

=== Network ===
A network licence is available for schools, colleges, universities and other multi-client situations.

== Version history ==
Version	Date	Description
2026.2.1	18 March 2026	Resolved drawing issue that occurred with multiple scores open simultaneously, AI-powered chord symbols, keypad UI update, bug fixes. and stability.
2026.2	25 February 2026	Dark theme on desktop, refreshed icons and UI polish, early improvements to cross-staff notation, and two-note tremolo engraving rule, ManuScript enhancements, bug fixes and stability.
2025.12	4 December 2025	Custom parts order, improved courtesy time signatures, text directive option, bug fixes and other improvements.
2025.10	15 October 2025	Better behaved trills and other lines, courtesy time signatures on new page or spread, status bar preferences, launch options, UX/UI, and bug fixes.
2025.7	31 July 2025	More staves in Sibelius First (up to 8) and Sibelius Artist (up to 24), note spacing control, and UI updates.
2025.4	14 April 2025	Implementing score subsets, dynamic parts and some useful fixes and improvements.
2025.3	13 March 2025	UI improvements to staff filters, pitch correction tool, copying and pasting bar rests containing fermatas and other fixes.
2025.2	6 February 2025	Automatic decondensing parts.
2024.10	24 October 2024	MusicXML improvements, supported with macOS Sequoia.
2024.8	20 August 2024	Update only for iOS, Android and Sibelius Cloud.
2024.6.1	17 July 2024	Bug fixes and improvements, particularly for MusicXML import and MIDI handling.
2024.6	20 June 2024	Native support for Apple silicon processors on Mac computers.
2024.3	7 March 2024	MIDI copy and paste, remote connection and resizeable Keypad.
2023.11	30 November 2023	Supported with macOS Sonoma.
2023.8	31 August 2023	Enhanced redo, auto-completing chord symbols using AI.
2023.6.1	July 2023	Last version to support macOS High Sierra.
2023.6	22 June 2023	Implementing AI for chord symbols.
2023.5	4 May 2023	Added hiding options for individual voiced parts.
2022.3	17 March 2022	Supported with Windows 11 and macOS Monterey.
2021.12	16 December 2021	Introduced Avid Cloud Licensing, last version to support macOS Sierra.
2021.9	27 September 2021	
2021.2	25 February 2021	Commands implemented in search bar, supported with Apple M1 processor under Rosetta.
2020.9	17 September 2020	
2020.6	3 June 2020	Improved MusicXML import and colour options for accessibility.
2020.3	26 March 2020	Implementing laissez vibrer ties.
2020.1	16 January 2020	Auto-Optimize staff spacing, added Dashed and Dotted and Tie-into Ties, added three house styles and manuscript papers, implementing wild-cards and large film-score time signatures.
2019.12	5 December 2019	
2019.9	September 2019	Last version to support Mac OS X Yosemite and OS X El Capitan.
2019.4	6 April 2019	Some bug fixes.
2019.1	1 January 2019	
2018.12	17 December 2018	
2018.11	November 2018	Recoded in Qt 5.
2018.7	11 July 2018	MusicXML improvements, bug fixes.
2018.6	26 June 2018	Free tier available, with all three tiers combined into one installer. Improvements in note spacing, grace notes, multi-text entry, tied notes and others.
2018.5	17 May 2018	Maintenance release to fix an issue where running some plug-ins would cause a memory leak that slowed Sibelius down until it was relaunched.
2018.4	April 2018	Multi-edits for text, improved note spacing and rebranded as Sibelius Ultimate.
2018.1	January 2018	New versioning scheme, improved workflow enhancements.
8.7.2	16 November 2017	
8.7	28 September 2017	Cloud sharing support.
8.5.1	19 January 2017	
8.5	1 December 2016	Added staff sizes on a per-system basis.
8.4.2	24 August 2016	
8.4	27 June 2016	Custom staff size, updated Scorch for iPad.
8.3	5 May 2016	Added individual note colors.
8.2	25 March 2016	
8.1.1	8 February 2016	
8.1	21 January 2016	
8.0.1	29 September 2015	
8.0	18 June 2015	
7.5.1	3 July 2014	Fixed issues with audio and video export, playback, localization, and the Timeline.
7.5	28 February 2014	Support for score sharing, improved playback and notation interpretation, Timeline window and other features.
7.1.3	26 September 2012	
7.1.2	20 March 2012	
7.1	19 December 2011	
7.0.3	20 October 2011	
7.0.2	23 August 2011	
7.0.1	15 August 2011	
7.0	27 July 2011	New ribbon-based user interface. This version of Sibelius (and all future versions) is no longer supported on Mac OS X v10.5 or earlier, and Mac computers with PowerPC processors; the last version with this support is Sibelius 6.2.
6.2	29 April 2010	
6.1	28 September 2009	
6.0	19 May 2009	
5.1	24 October 2007	
5.0	7 June 2007	
4.0	5 July 2005	
3.0	23 September 2003	
2.0	12 November 2001	First released on Windows, then followed by Mac OS X released in March 2002.
1.2	1 June 1999	Macintosh version released.
1.0	3 September 1998	Windows version released.
Sibelius 7	April 1993	Initial release for RISC OS.

== See also ==
- List of scorewriters
- List of music software
