= Gabriella Quevedo =

Swedish fingerstyle guitarist (born 1997)

- Born: Gabriella Evelina Quevedo; 12 January 1997 (age 29); Kinna, Sweden
- Genres: Fingerstyle, pop, rock
- Instrument: Acoustic guitar
- Years active: 2009–present
- Website: gabriellaquevedoofficial.com

Gabriella Evelina Quevedo (born 12 January 1997, Kinna, Sweden) is a Swedish guitarist.

== Early life ==
Quevedo grew up in Kinna and developed an interest in guitar because her father played the instrument. Her father is from Argentina and her mother is Argentine-Swedish. In addition to Swedish, she also speaks English and understands Spanish. She began playing guitar at age twelve, quickly discovering, and mastering fingerstyle guitar techniques, which led to her recording a number of covers of other guitarists' performances and her own guitar arrangements on YouTube.

In 2012, she won first prize in the category of "young talent" on the Uppsala International Guitar Festival.

In 2014, she won the Ryan Seacrest Contest for the best cover of the song "Young Girls" by Bruno Mars.

In 2016, she was awarded the Hagström grant of the Royal Swedish Academy of Music (Kungliga Musikaliska Akademien).

In July 2018, her studio album entitled Acoustic Cover Songs Vol. 1 containing 16 songs appeared on Spotify, iTunes, Deezer, Amazon Music, Google Play Music, Tidal, YouTube Music and Apple Music.

At the end of 2019, Gabriella released her first original musics "Last Time" and "Remember". They were recorded at Mono Music Studio in Stockholm, established by former ABBA member Benny Andersson.

In 2025, Gabriella's YouTube channel had 1.64 million subscribers and 309 million views. Her cover of Pink Floyd's Another Brick In The Wall has over 23 million views on YouTube.

=== Guitar ===
She first learned to play on her father's Yamaha guitar, but later her parents bought Quevedo her own guitar, a "shiny black Yamaha with a cutaway", which is seen in her earlier videos on YouTube, and which was signed by Tommy Emmanuel.

She later started playing Taylor Guitars, first a custom Taylor GC8e, then a Taylor 912ce and a custom Taylor 812ce. Quevedo has had commercial arrangements with Taylor Guitars and G7th, The Capo Company.

== Concerts ==
Gabriella Quevedo has appeared in concerts in Sweden, Norway, Germany, the US and Asia, including:

- with Hansel Pethig, Lemgo, Germany (2012)
- with Sungha Jung, Blomberg, Germany (2012) and Sweden (2014)
- Uppsala International Guitar Festival, Uppsala, Sweden (2012, 2014)
- with Tommy Emmanuel, Gothenburg, Sweden (2012, 2015)
- Sundsvall Gitarrfestival, Sundsvall, Sweden (2013, 2017)
- On 18 October 2013, in Blomberg, Germany, she played Superstition by Stevie Wonder with Adam Rafferty.
- Larvik Gitar Festival, Larvik, Norway (2014, 2017)
- On 10 October 2015, at konserthus in Göteborgs, Andy McKee invited her to play her cover of Tension by Kotaro Oshio.
- Winter NAMM Show, US (2016)
- concert tour in Japan, South Korea, Taiwan and China (2016)

== Musical style and influences ==
Quevedo cites her main influences as Tommy Emmanuel, Sungha Jung, Kotaro Oshio and Andy McKee, whose music she has included in her recordings and performance repertoires, and with whom she has appeared in concerts in Sweden and on the international stage.

Quevedo's musical style draws inspiration from that of Marcin Patrzalek, Kent Nishimura, and Polyphia.

== Discography ==
Studio albums

- Acoustic Cover Songs Vol. 1 (2018)
- Last Time (2019)
- Remember (2019)
- Gabriella's Acoustic Arrangements (2020)
- Acoustic ABBA Covers (2024)

EP

- Christmas Time (2021)
- Another War (Acoustic Version) featuring Linus Svenning (2022)
- Bobby Helms Jingle Bell Rock (2023)
- Christmas Carol We Wish You a Merry Christmas (2024)
- Sia Snowman (2024)
- Creed My Sacrifice (2025)
