= Hampus Zackrisson =

Swedish footballer (born 1994)

Personal information
- Full name: Karl Hampus Zackrisson
- Date of birth: 24 August 1994 (age 32)
- Place of birth: Skene, Sweden
- Height: 1.89 m (6 ft 2 1/2 in)
- Position: Defender

Team information
- Current team: Varbergs BoIS
- Number: 3

Youth career
- –2008: Skene IF
- 2009–2013: IFK Göteborg

Senior career*
Years	Team	Apps	(Gls)
2013–2014	IFK Göteborg	3	(0)
2015–2017	Degerfors IF	68	(0)
2018–	Varbergs BoIS	174	(3)

International career
2013	Sweden U19	2	(0)
- * Club domestic league appearances and goals as of 11 November 2026

Karl Hampus Zackrisson (born 24 August 1994 in Skene) is a Swedish footballer who plays for Varbergs BoIS as a defender.

== Club career ==
=== IFK Göteborg ===
Hampus Zackrisson started playing football for local side Skene IF before joining IFK Göteborg's youth academy in 2008. Zackrisson made his Allsvenskan debut during the 2013 season in an away game against IF Brommapojkarna on 13 July. He was also part of IFK's U19 team that became Swedish champions that year after defeating AIK in the final. Ahead of the following season, head coach Mikael Stahre described Zackrisson as a "loyal and good team player", and the club offered him a senior contract. On 21 October 2014, IFK Göteborg announced that Zackrisson wouldn't be part of the squad for the 2015 season.

=== Degerfors IF ===
On 8 December 2014 Zackrisson, signed a three-year contract with Superettan side Degerfors IF. Degerfors manager Patrik Werner said that he saw Zackrisson primarily as a defender, rather than the midfielder he had often been used as at IFK Göteborg. Werner also praised his talent, describing Zackrisson as "one of the country's most promising players in that position".

He played 27 league games in his first season and was named the signing of the year by the local paper NWT.

=== Varbergs BoIS ===
Ahead of the 2018 season, Zackrisson signed for Varbergs BoIS on a free transfer after his contract with Degerfors expired. In 2019 he helped Varbergs BoIS earn promotion to Allsvenskan for the first time in the club's history.

Zackrisson scored his first competitive goal on 19 July 2020 in an Allsvenskan game against AIK.

Varbergs BoIS stint in Allsvenskan lasted for four years until degradation to Superettan after the 2023 season. However, Zackrisson extended his contract with the club for three more years, becoming a club icon according to the club director Dan Skogman.

As of 2026, Zackrisson is in his ninth season with the club.

== International career ==
Zackrisson played two games for Sweden U19 national team in 2013.

== Career statistics ==
As of 3 October 2016

Club	Season	League			Cup		Continental		Total	
Club	Season	Division	Apps	Goals	Apps	Goals	Apps	Goals	Apps	Goals
IFK Göteborg	2012	Allsvenskan	0	0	0	0	—		0	0
IFK Göteborg	2013	Allsvenskan	1	0	0	0	0	0	1	0
IFK Göteborg	2014	Allsvenskan	2	0	1	0	0	0	3	0
IFK Göteborg	Total		3	0	1	0	0	0	4	0
Degerfors IF	2015	Superettan	27	0	1	0	—		28	0
Degerfors IF	2016	Superettan	20	0	1	0	—		21	0
Degerfors IF	Total		47	0	2	0	0	0	49	0
Career total			50	0	3	0	0	0	53	0
