= Parlor guitar =

Small acoustic guitar

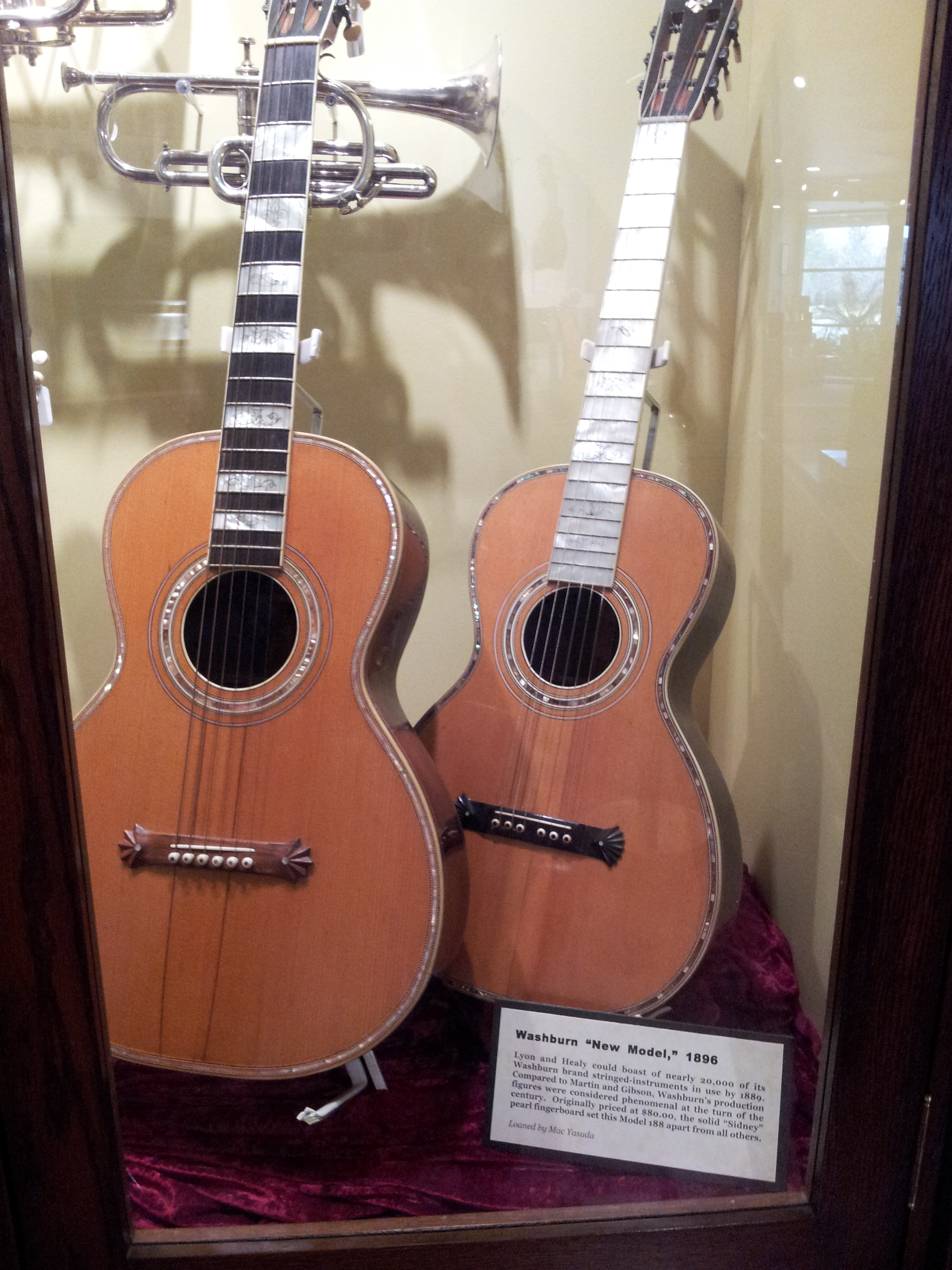
Parlor guitars in 19th century: Washburn Parlor Guitar (1894); Washburn "New Model" (1896)

Parlor or parlour guitar usually refers to a type of acoustic guitar smaller than a Size No.0 Concert Guitar by C. F. Martin & Company. Mottola's Cyclopedic Dictionary of Lutherie Terms describes the term as referring to "any guitar that is narrower than current standards."

== Overview ==
The popularity of these guitars peaked from the late 19th century until the 1950s. Many blues and folk musicians have used smaller-bodied guitars, which were often more affordable, mass production models.

Parlor guitar has also come to denote a style of American guitar music from the 19th and early 20th centuries. Noted composers include William Foden, Winslow Hayden, William Bateman, Justin Holland, and Wilhelm Bischoff. The music for the guitar includes a variety of dance forms (waltz, schottische, polka), instrumental arrangements of popular songs, guitar arrangements of then popular classical music, operatic arrangements and music from European guitar composers (Sor, Giuliani, Carcassi, Coste and Mertz). In the 1860s, Henry Worrall composed two influential pieces for parlor guitar, "The Siege of Sebastopol" (sometimes spelled Sevastopol) and "Spanish Fandango."

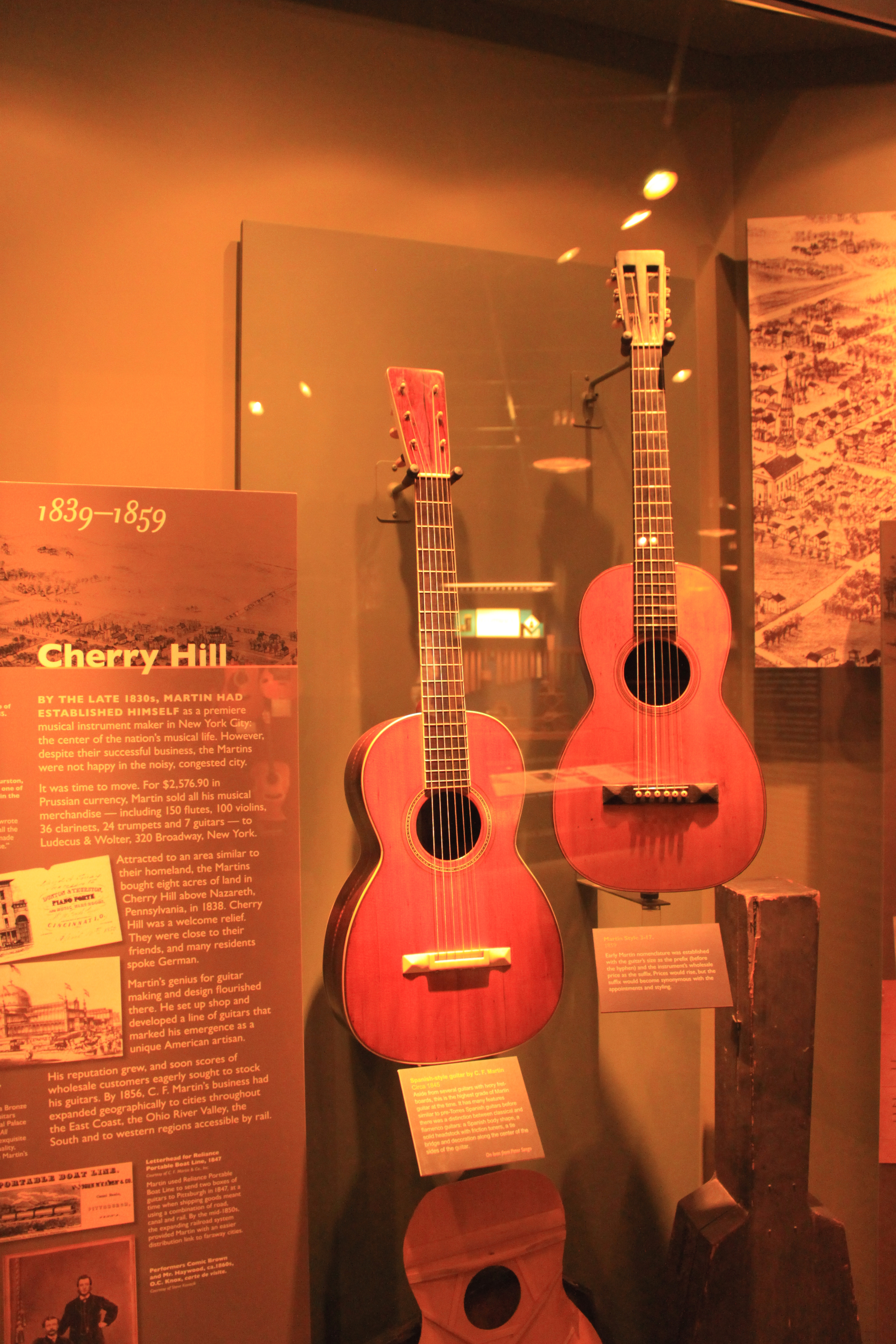
Spanish-style (c.1845) / Size No.3 (3-17) (1859) guitars by C. F. Martin

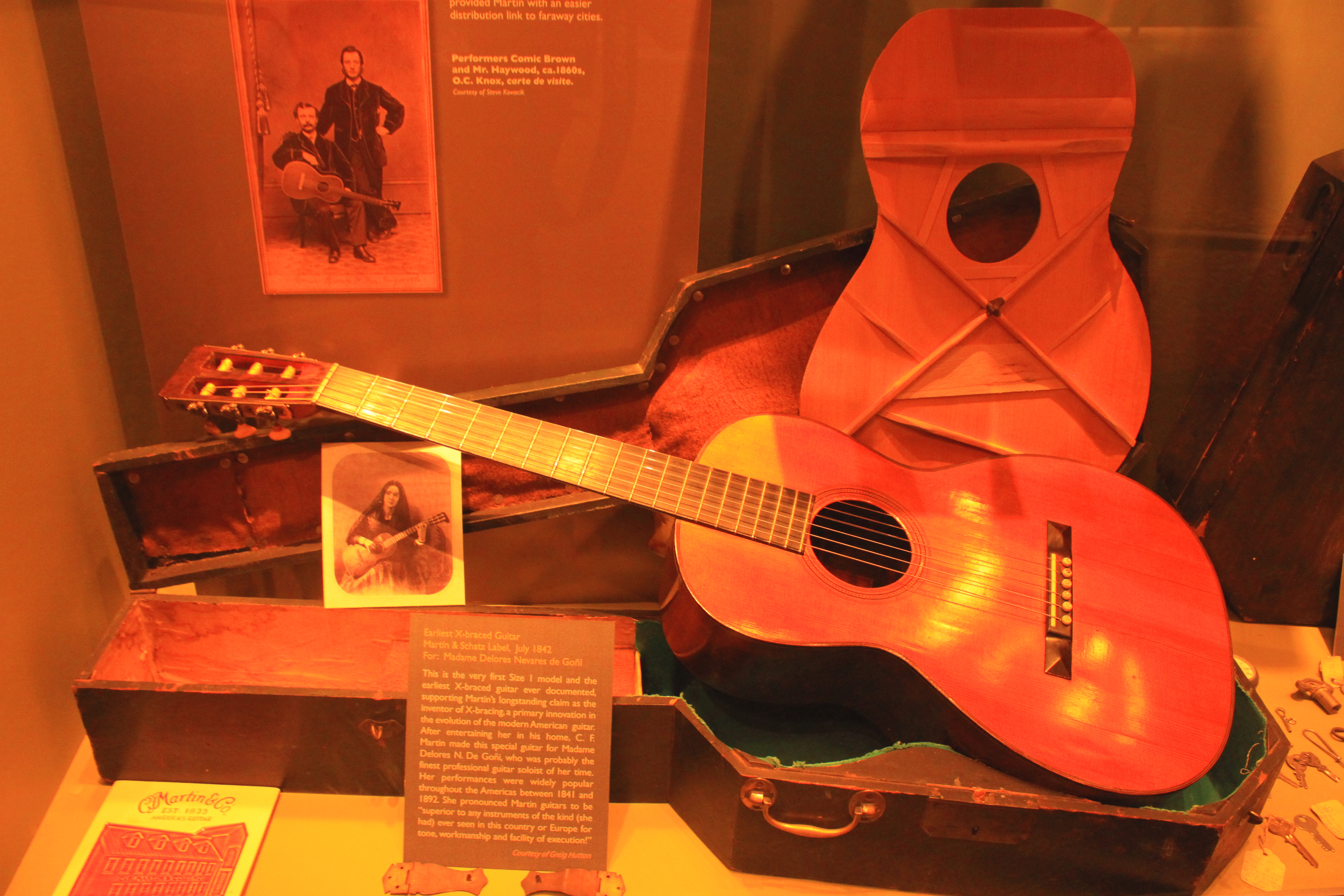
Very first Size No.1 guitar with earliest X-Bracing (1842) by Martin & Schatz

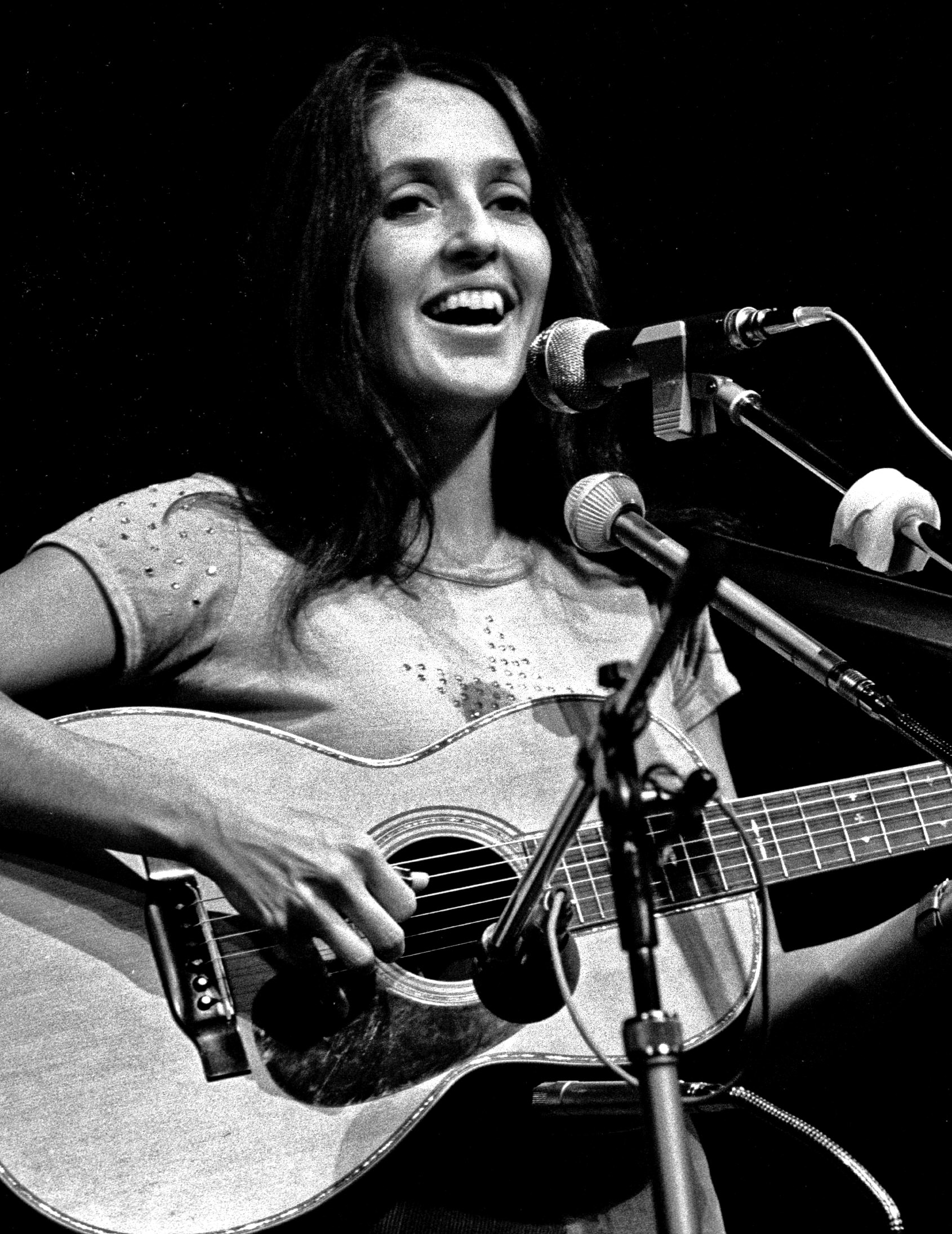
c.f. Size No.0 (0-45) guitar played by Joan Baez

In the 2000s, smaller guitars began enjoying a renaissance among players "who like their midrangery tone, historic vibe, and easy portability". Modern parlor guitars come in a wide variety of tonewoods. Takamine Guitars produces one made of cedar and koa, with a preamp powered by a 12AU7, the first acoustic guitar with a tube preamp. Fylde Guitars produces the 'Single Malt Ariel' constructed from used whisky casks.

Modern parlor & mini guitars

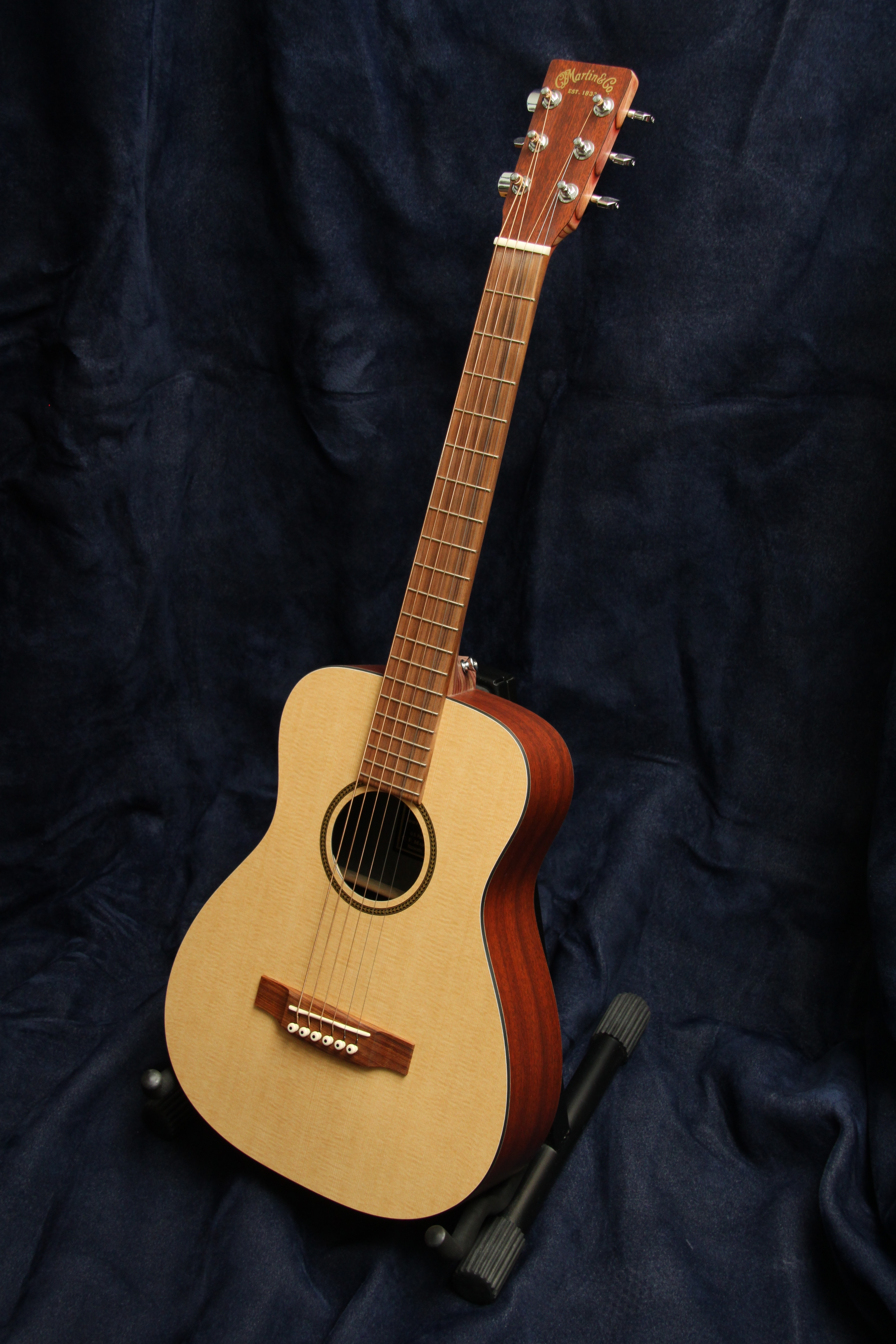
C. F. Martin Little Martin (Modified Size No.0)

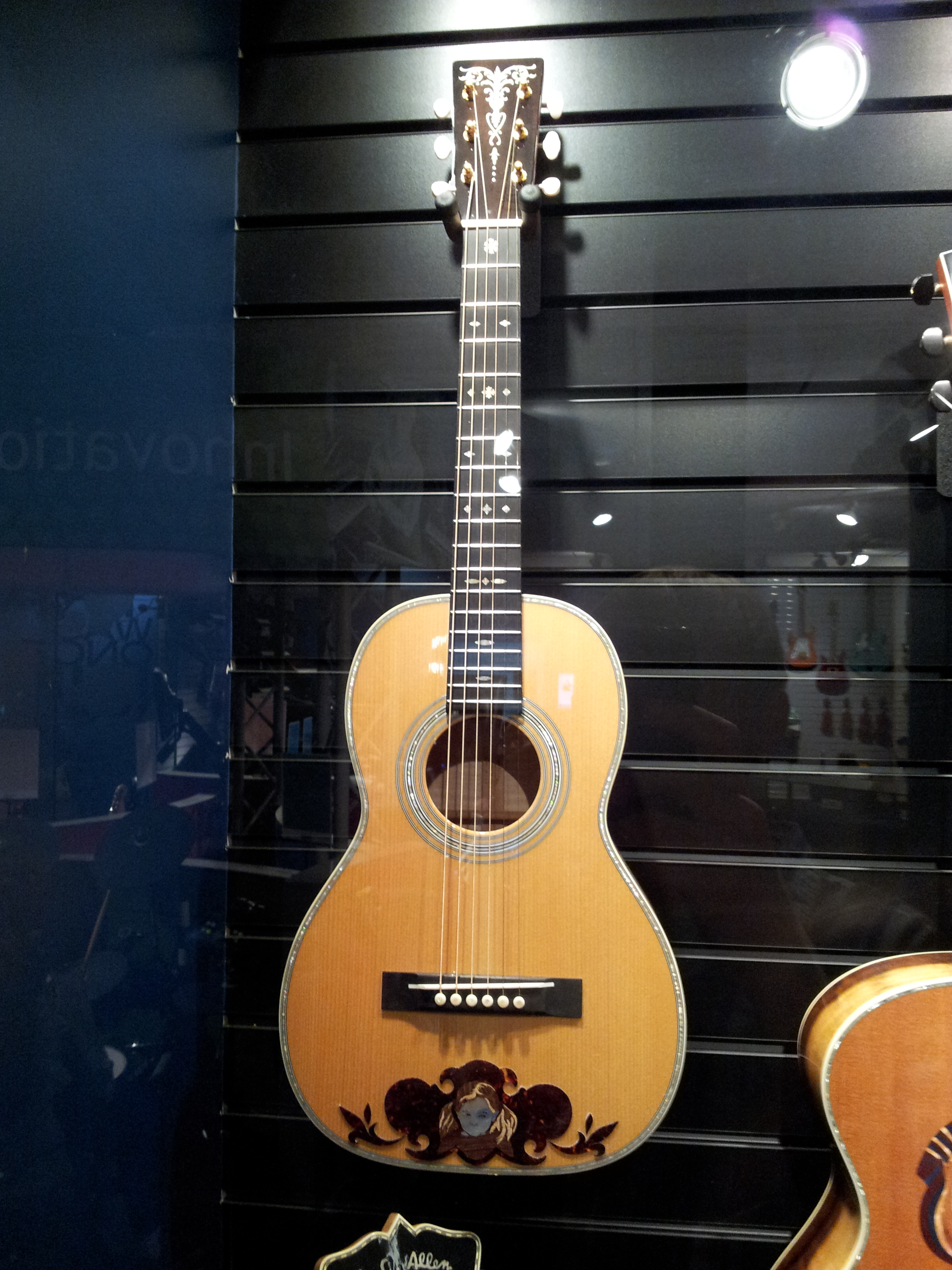
C. F. Martin Claire (Size No.5)

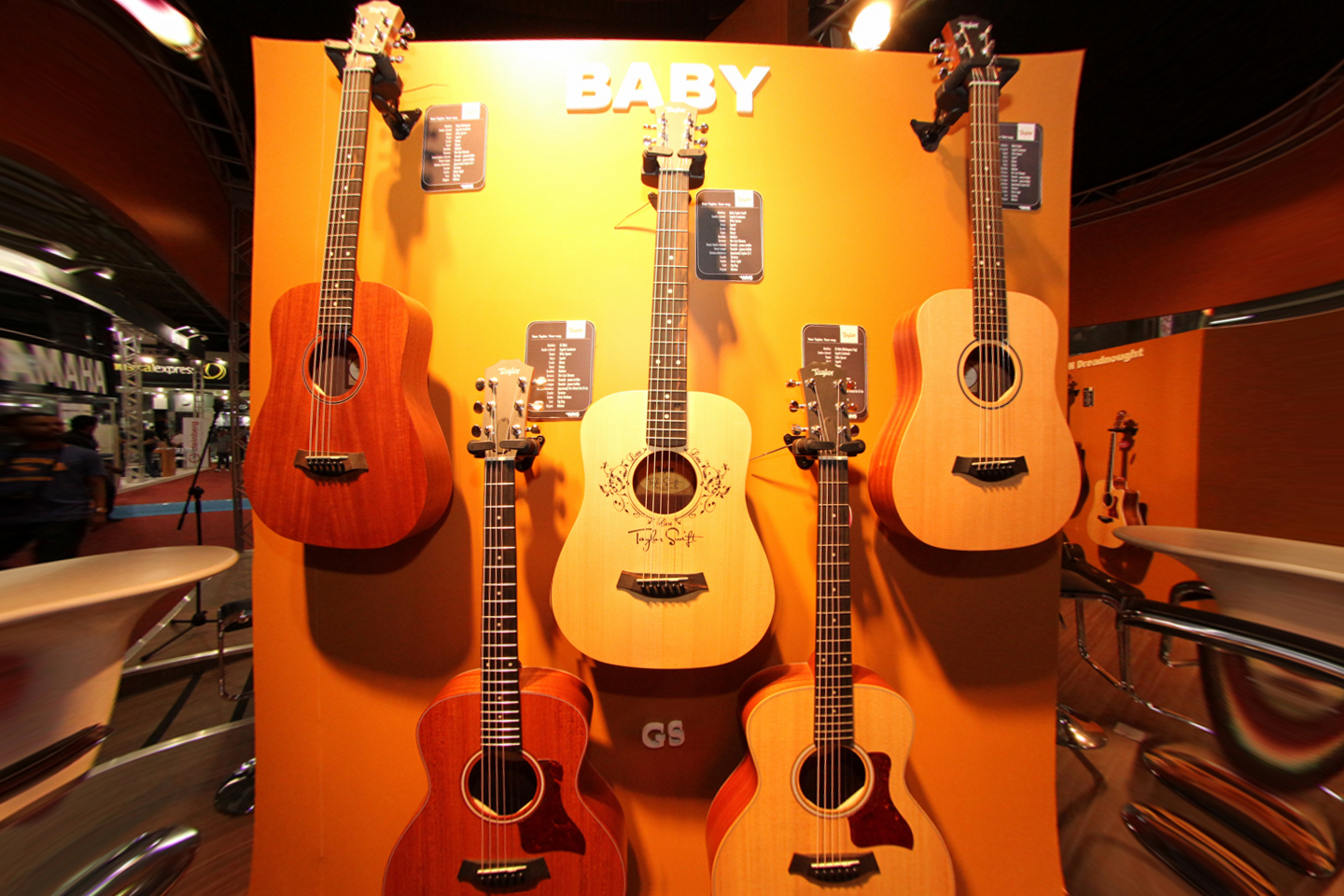
Taylor Baby Taylor (¾-size) & GS Mini

== See also ==
- Fingerstyle guitar — Finger-picking style is preferred on Parlor guitars (in contrast to the strumming style on Dreadnought guitars)
- Baroque guitar — small guitars in Baroque era
- Early Romantic guitar — small guitars from 1790 to 1830
- Classical guitar
  - Antonio Torres Jurado — father of modern classical guitars in Romantic era
- Travel guitar — a similar small modern guitar
- C. F. Martin & Company — Martin defined the larger "Size No. 0" as Concert Guitar, in contrast to the smaller, traditional Parlor guitars.
