= Ultimate Guitar =

Guitarist community website

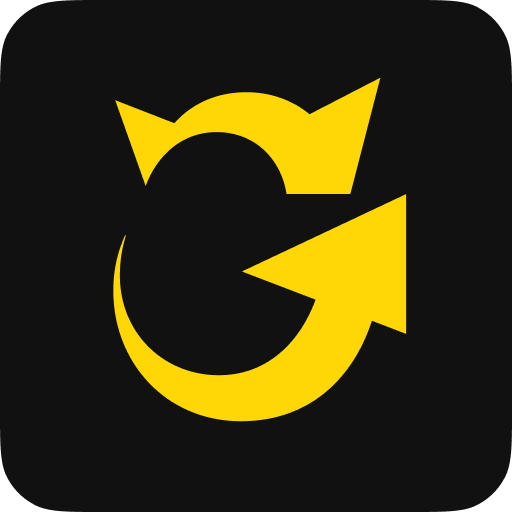
- Website type: Tablature archive
- Owner: Ultimate Guitar USA LLC
- Creator: Eugeny Naidenov
- Parent: Muse Group
- Website: ultimate-guitar.com
- Commercial: Yes
- Registration: Optional

Ultimate Guitar (Ultimate Guitar USA LLC), also known as Ultimate-Guitar.com or simply UG, is an online platform for guitarists and musicians, started on October 9, 1998, by Eugeny Naidenov and based in San Francisco, US. Its website and mobile application provide free and paid user-submitted guitar tablatures and chord sheets, as well as video courses, reviews of music and equipment, interviews with musicians and forums. It is now part of Muse Group.

== Features ==
Users of Ultimate Guitar are able to view, request, vote and comment on tablatures in the site's forum. Guitar Pro and Power Tab files can be run through programs in order to play the tablature. Members can also submit album, multimedia and gear reviews, as well as guitar lessons and news articles. Approved works are published on the website. The forum is moderated, but there has been no censorship of curse and swear words since September 1, 2015.

From 2007 to 2014, Ultimate Guitar allowed its users to create profiles, enabling social networking in a way similar to sites such as MySpace and Facebook. Profiles allowed users to promote their musical projects, photos of gear, snippets of original music, and more. The feature was disabled due to lack of use, as well as legal liability due to copyright violations.

== Relationships with music publishers and songwriters ==
In late 2004 to early 2005, after Taborama and MXtabs.net closed due to legal threats from the Music Publishers Association of America, UG saw a surge of new users flock to the community. UG argued that it was not subject to the MPA legal actions because its headquarters were in Russia and the site's practices complied with Russian laws. Since then, UG has signed license agreements with thousands of publishers, including Sony, EMI, Peermusic, Alfred, Hal Leonard, Faber and Music Sales, through which the songwriters receive compensation for the display of the tabs.

On April 10, 2010, Ultimate Guitar entered an additional licensing agreement with Harry Fox Agency. The agreement included rights for lyrics display, title search and tablature display with download and print capabilities. Harry Fox's over 44,000 represented publishers have the opportunity to opt in to the licensing arrangement with UG.
