= Arne Andersson (footballer) =

Swedish footballer (1921–2003)

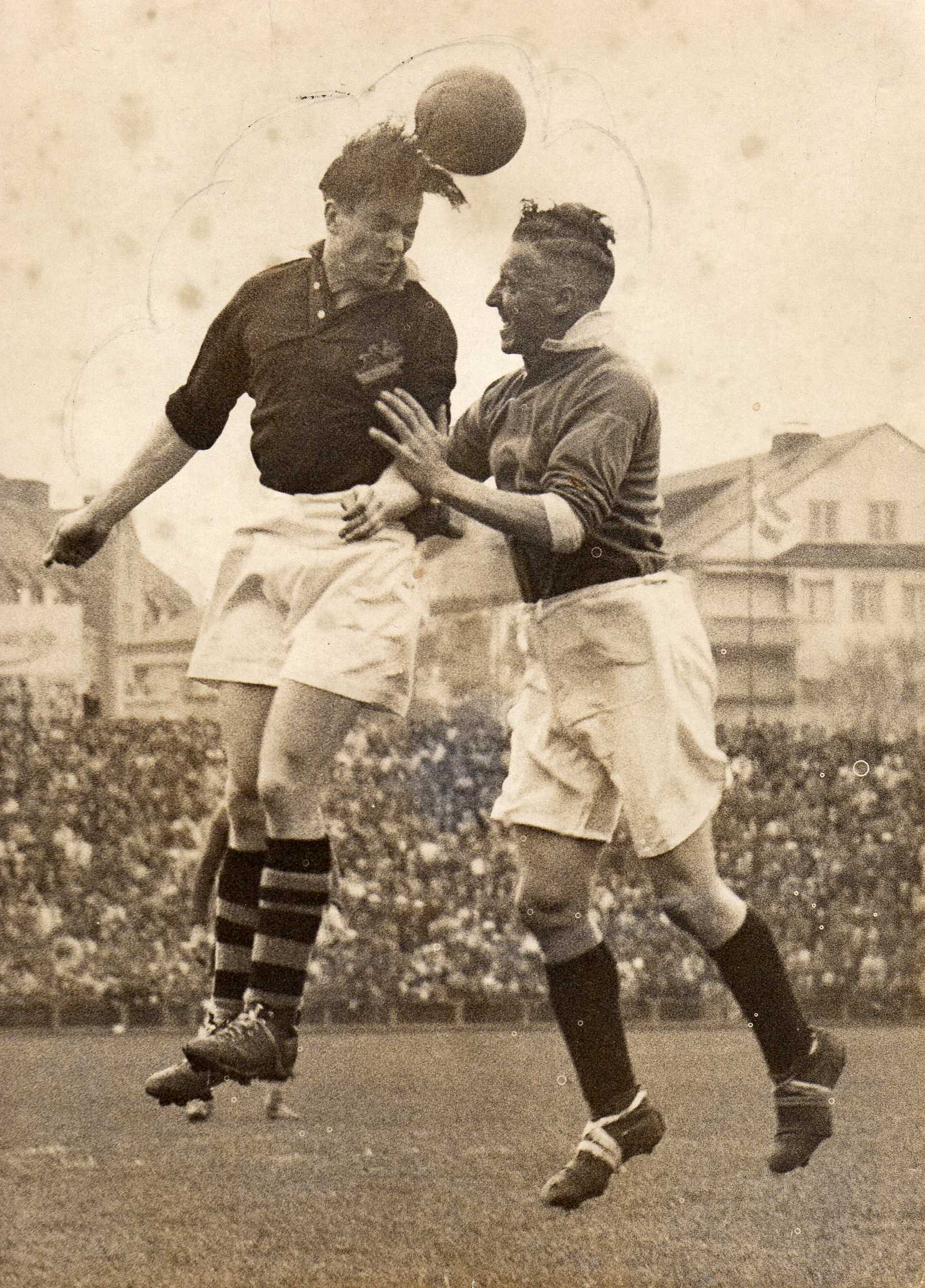
- AIK-Birmingham City FC, 1-2. Arne Andersson dueling with Wilson Jones. Aftonbladet's picture of the year in 1946.

Personal information
- Full name: Arne Rudolf Andersson
- Date of birth: 13 April 1921
- Place of birth: Kinna, Sweden
- Date of death: 23 February 2003 (aged 81)
- Place of death: Fritsla, Sweden
- Height: 1.76 m (5 ft 9 1/2 in)
- Position: Midfielder

Youth career
- 1935–1940: Fritsla IF
- 1946–1956: Fritsla IF

Senior career*
Years	Team	Apps	(Gls)
1941–1943	IF Elfsborg	1	(1)
1944–1946	AIK	45	(12)
Total		46	(13)
- * Club domestic league appearances and goals

Arne Andersson (13 March 1921 – 23 February 2003) was a Swedish football player. He played professionally for IF Elfsborg and AIK at Allsvenskan (Swedish football top-tier).

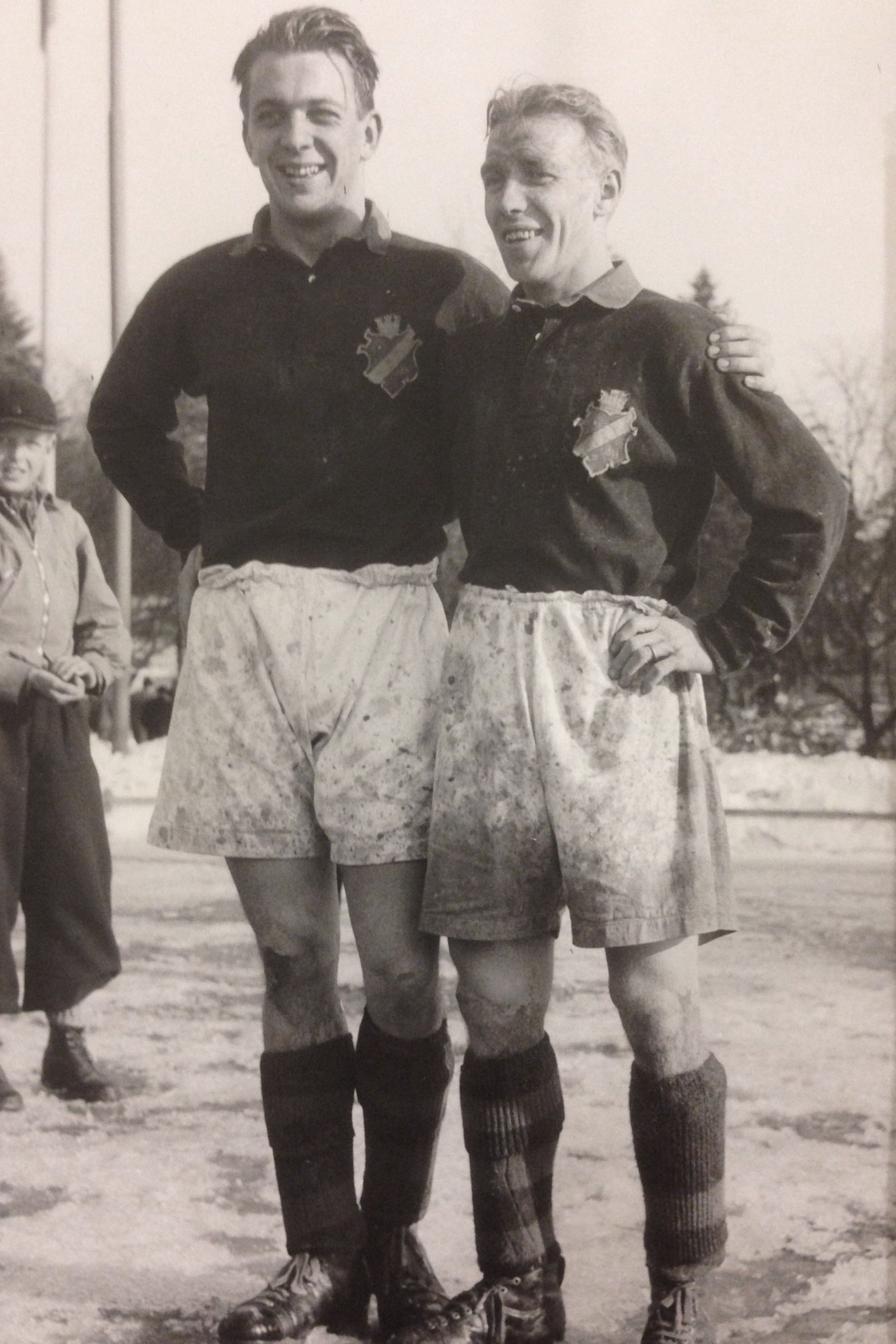
Arne Andersson and Henry "Garvis" Carlsson
