= Travel guitar =

Small guitars with a full or nearly full scale-length

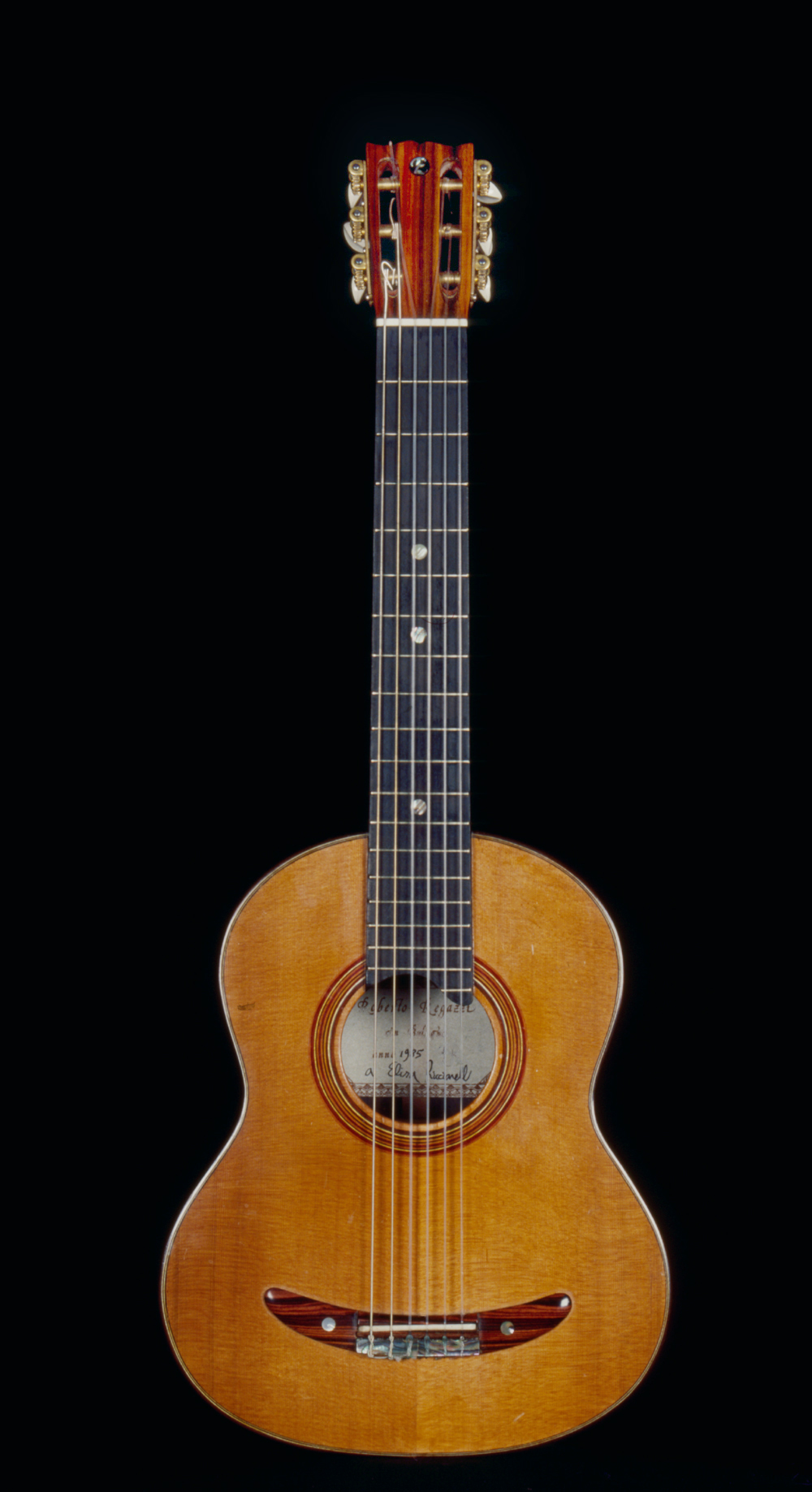
Travel Guitar for Elisa Ricciarelli, made
by Roberto Regazzi in Bologna, 1985

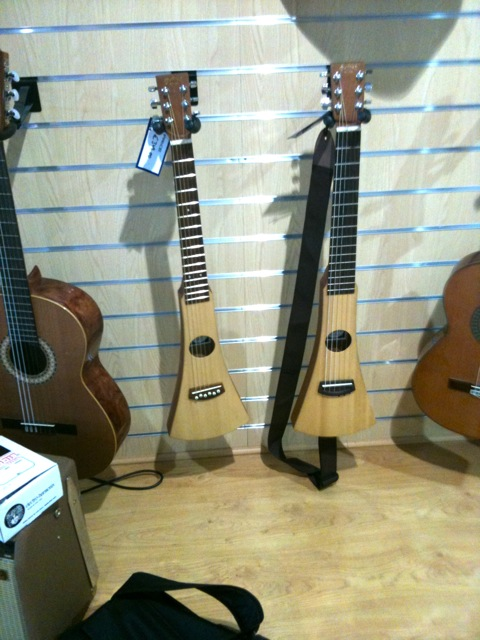
C.F. Martin Backpacker
Steel String and Classical models

Travel guitars are small guitars with a full or nearly full scale length. In contrast, a reduced scale length is typical for guitars intended for children, which have scale lengths of one quarter (ukulele guitar, or guitalele), one half, and three quarters.

Although they were originally designed as a portable practice guitar, travel guitars have been used on stage by some professional performers.

== Examples ==
Examples of travel guitars include the following:

C. F. Martin & Company

- Model: Backpacker.

A very small guitar, shaped like a broom, similar in shape to certain types of psaltery, and designed to be very portable and inexpensive while still being constructed of quality woods. The guitar is famous for having originally been designed by Robert McAnally before Martin took over the design, and was the first guitar to be taken into space. The guitar has also been taken up Mount Everest.

- Model: Little Martin

Taylor

- Model: Baby Taylor

== Gallery ==
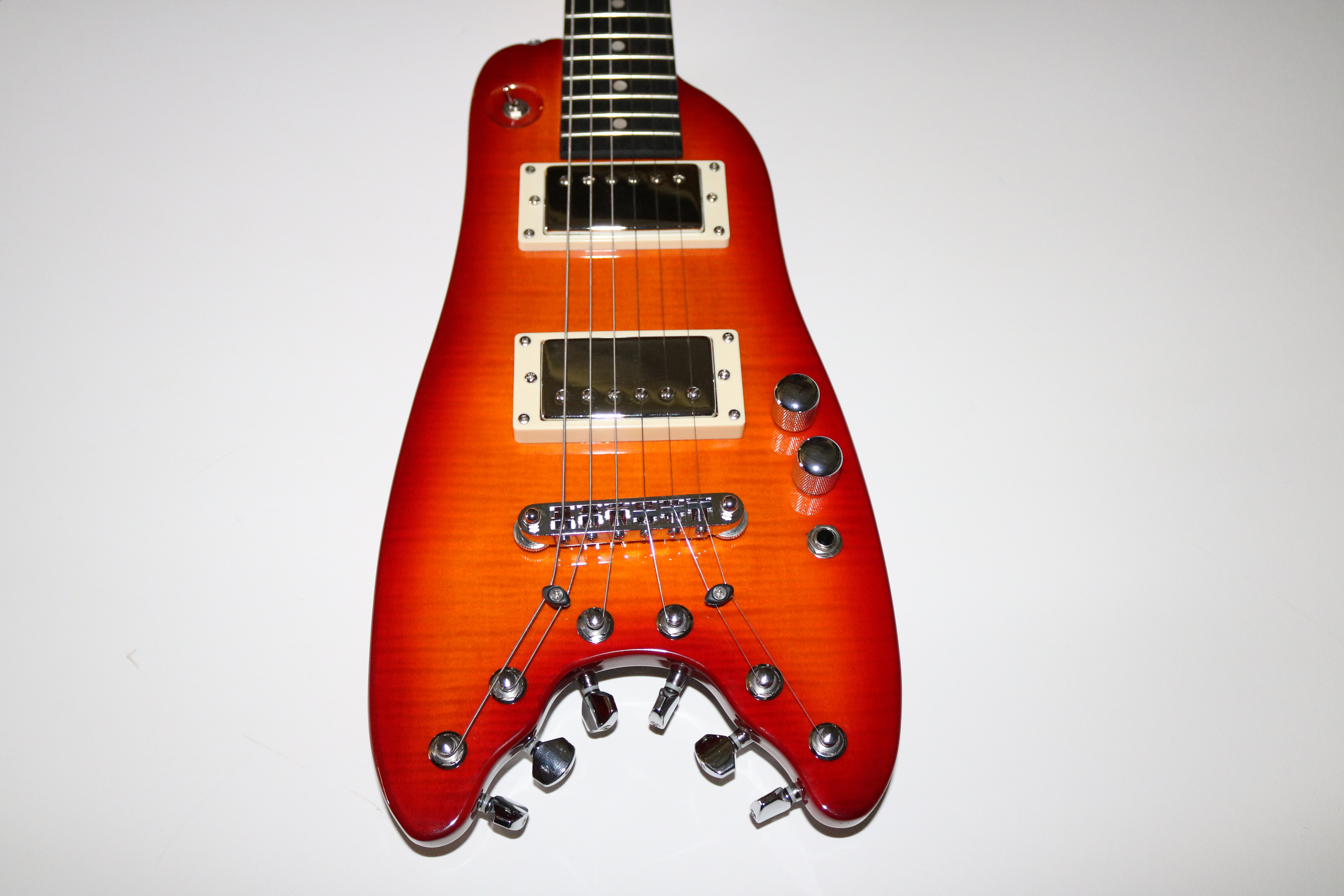
Strobel Travel Guitar

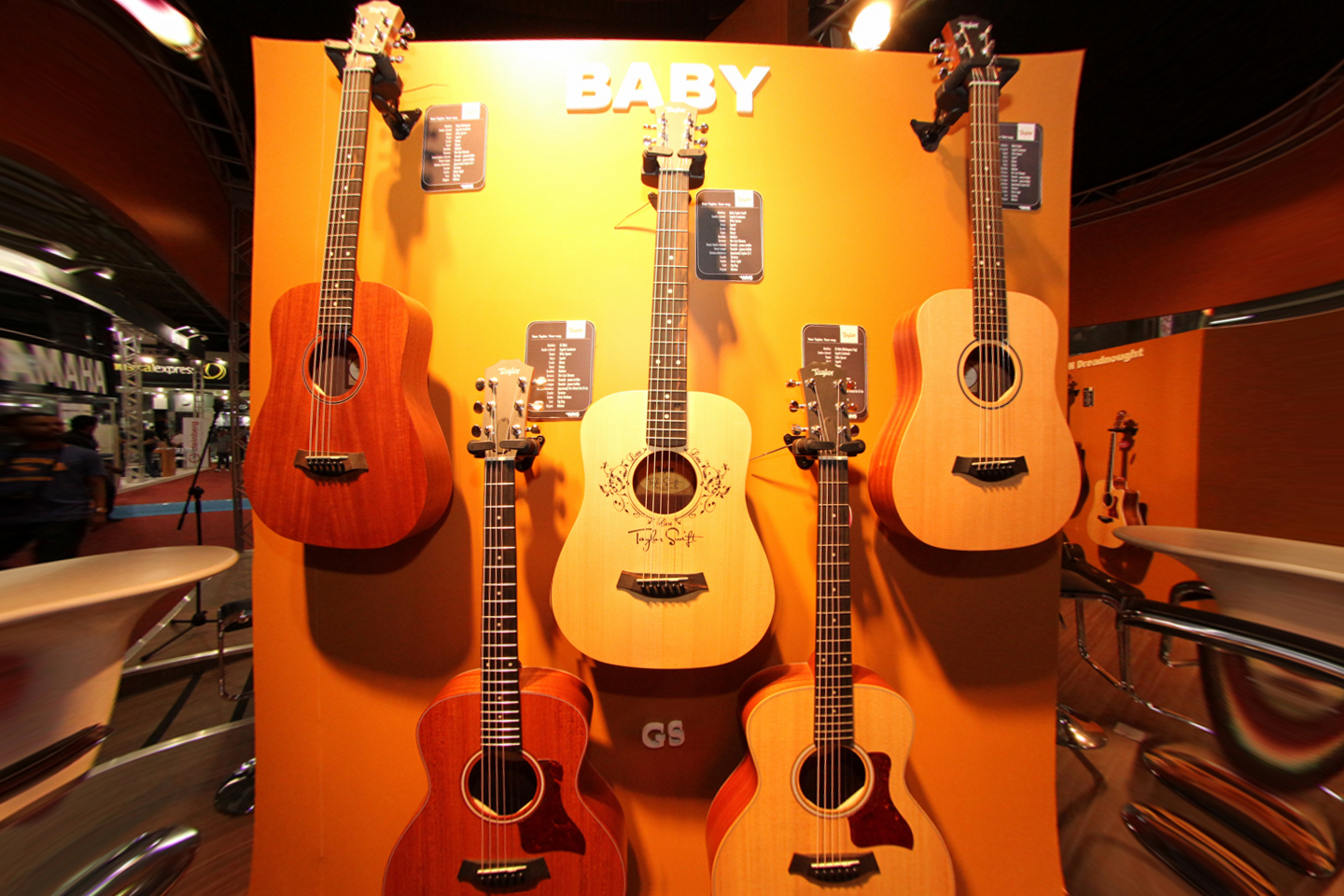
Taylor Baby Taylor series with GS Mini

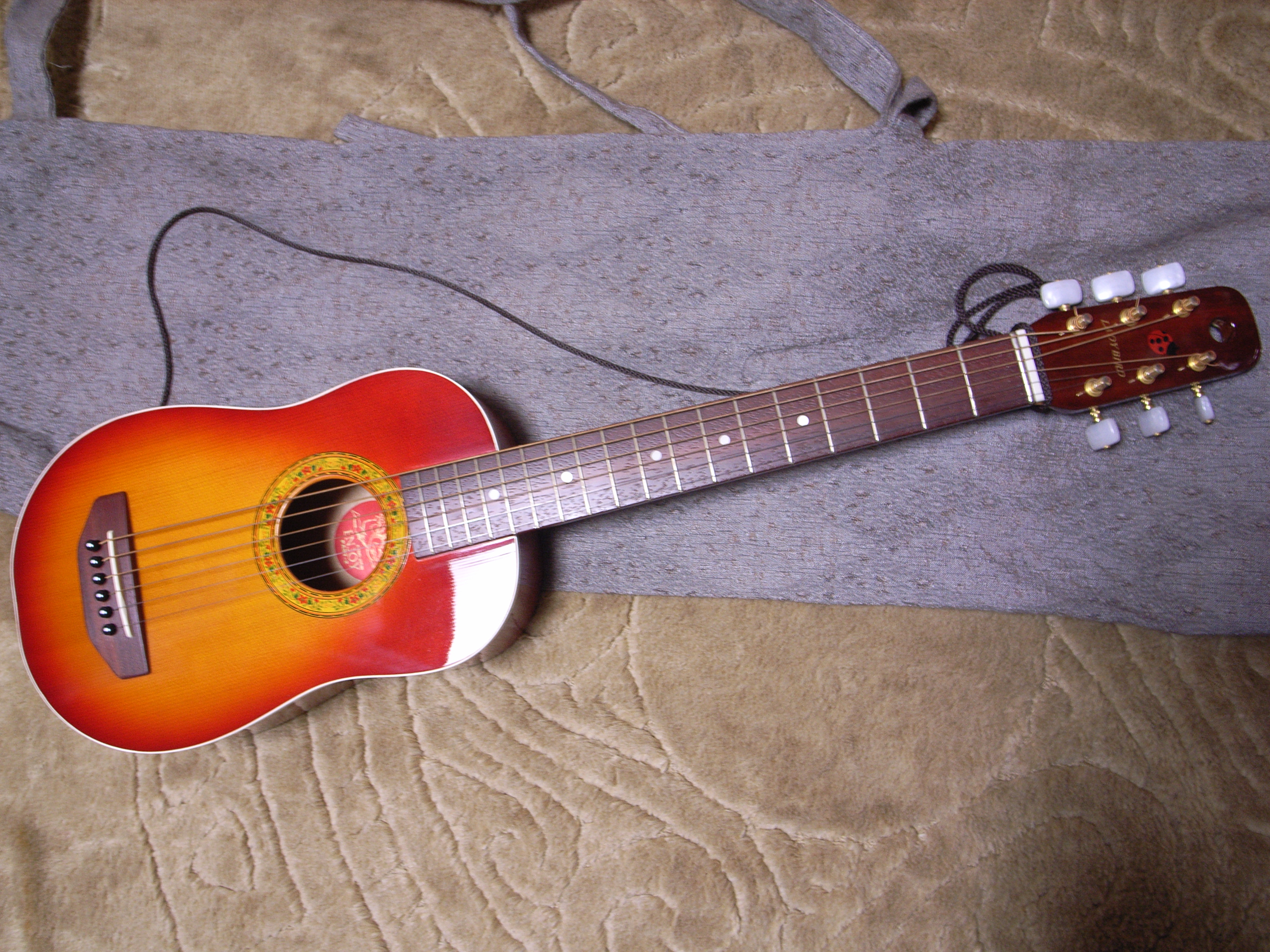
K. Yairi Lady Bird

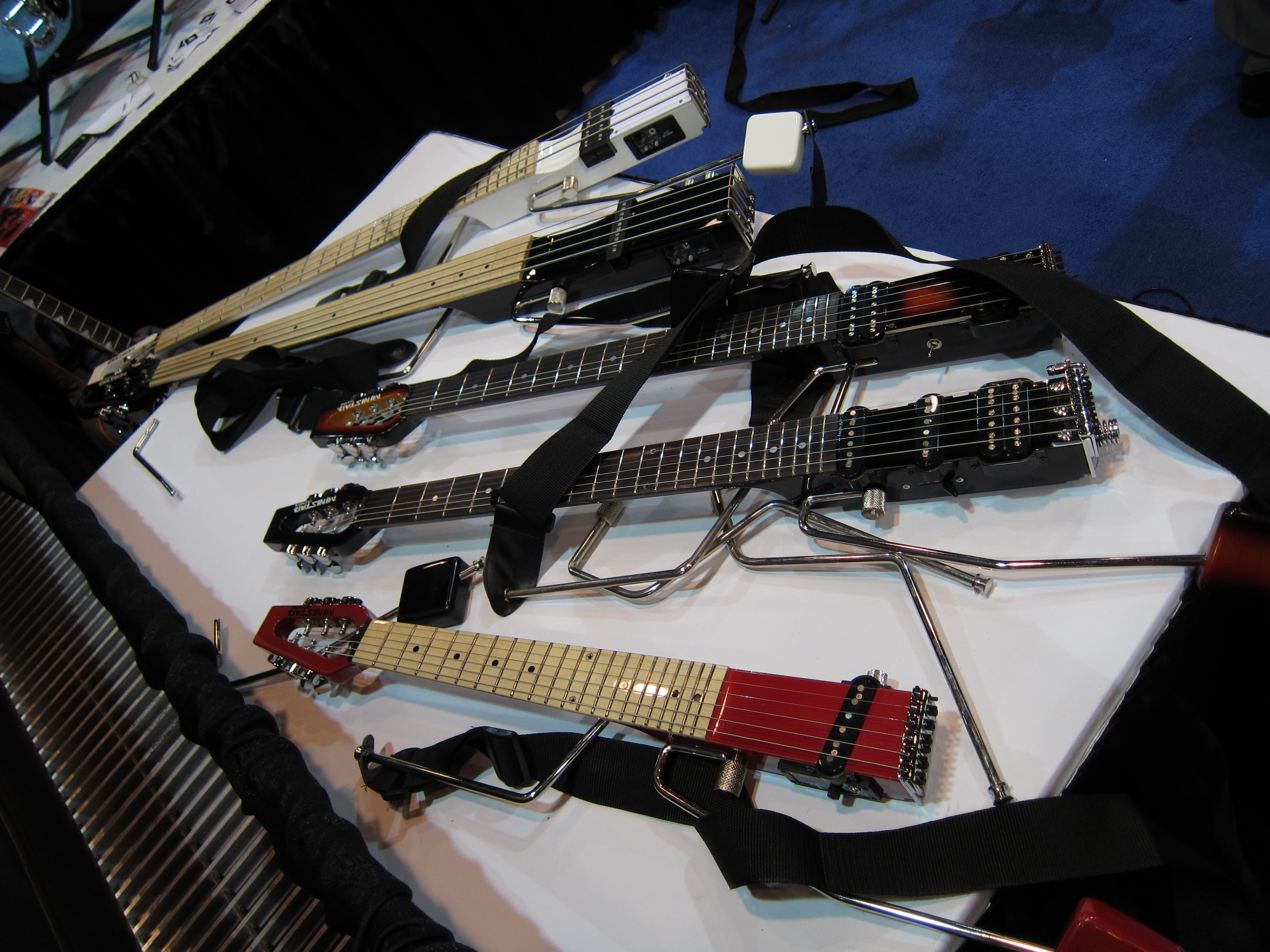
Ministar guitar & basses, 2010 Summer NAMM

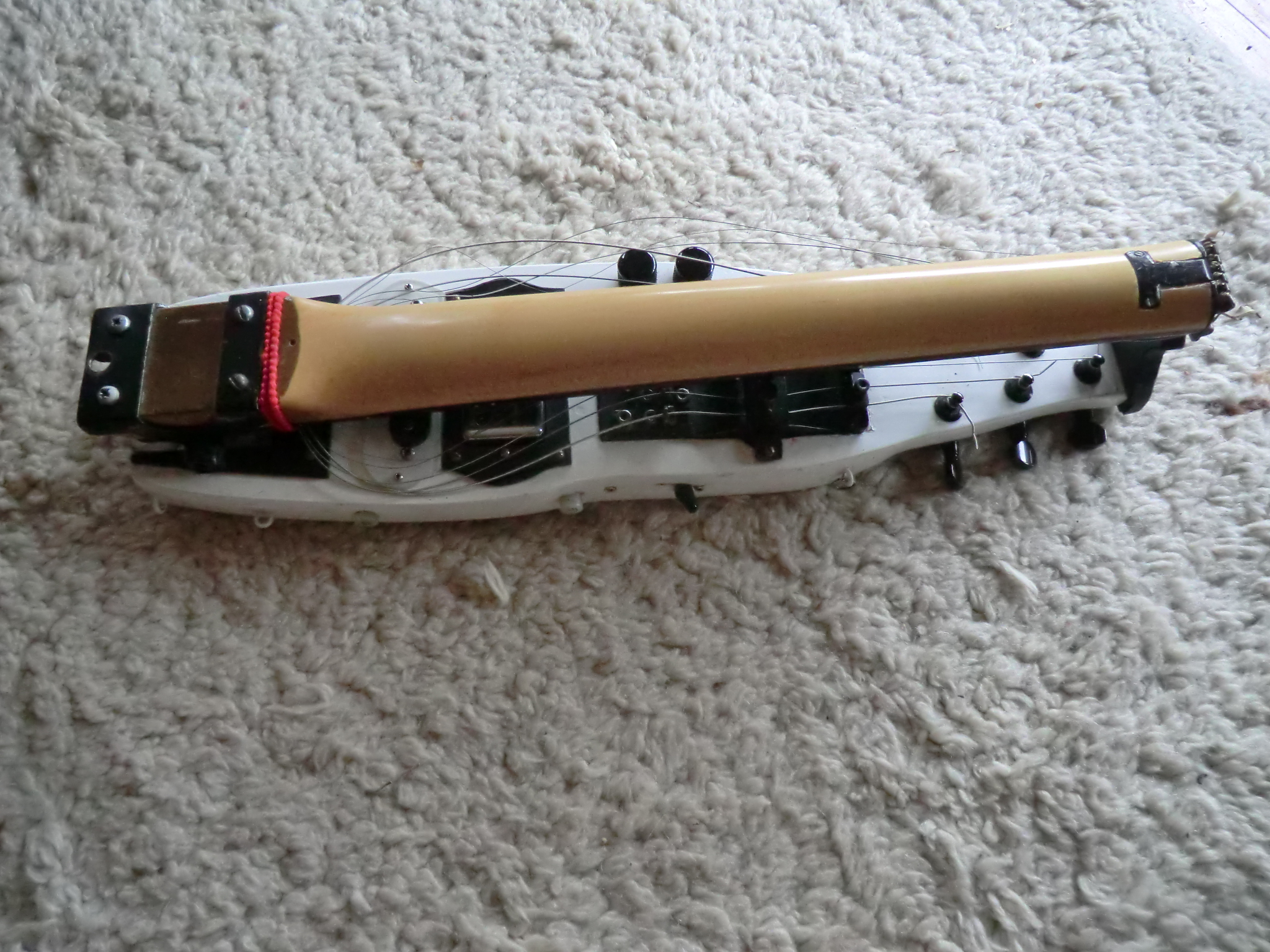
"Clémendot" folding guitar folded

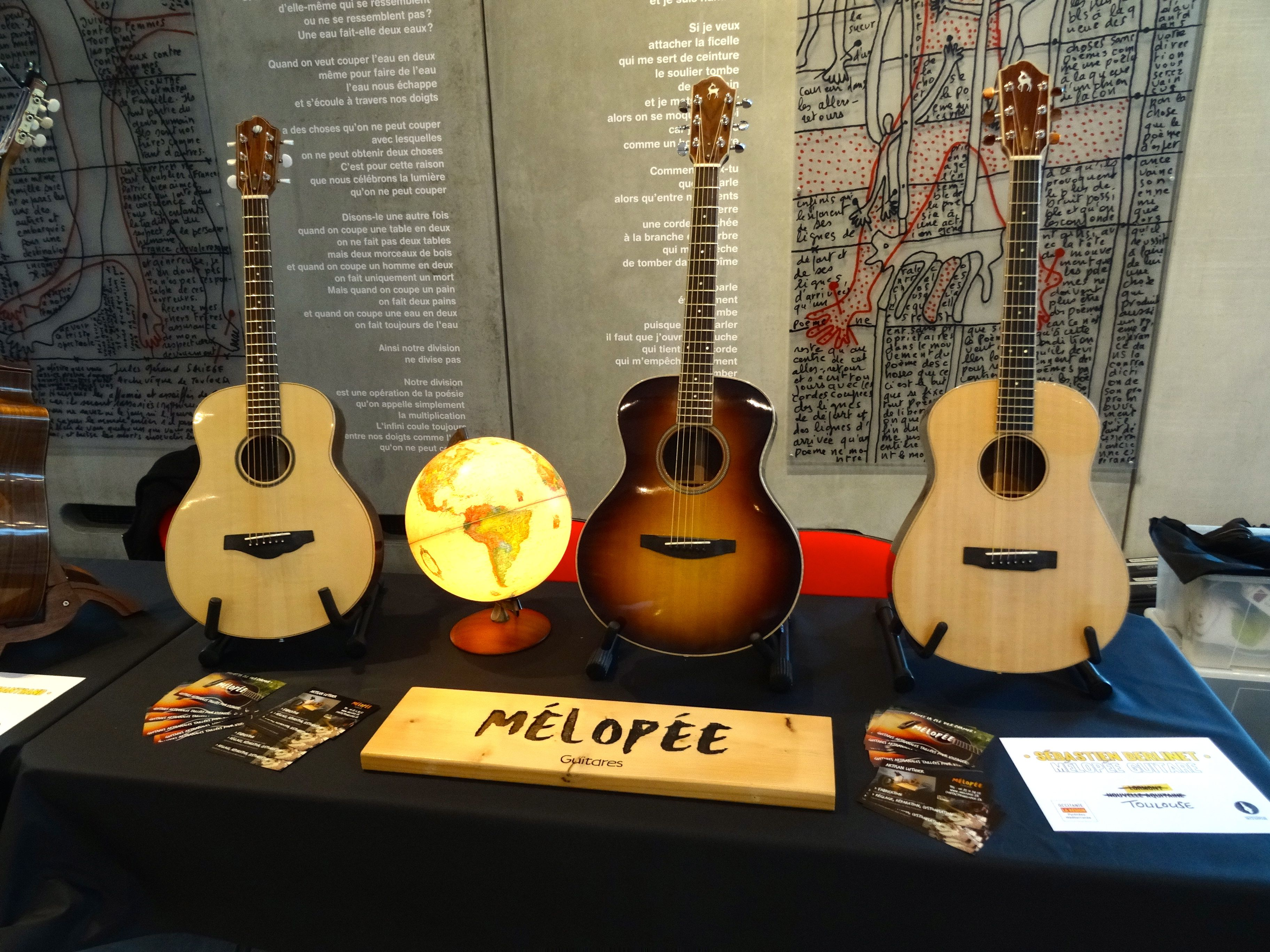
Mélopée travel guitars
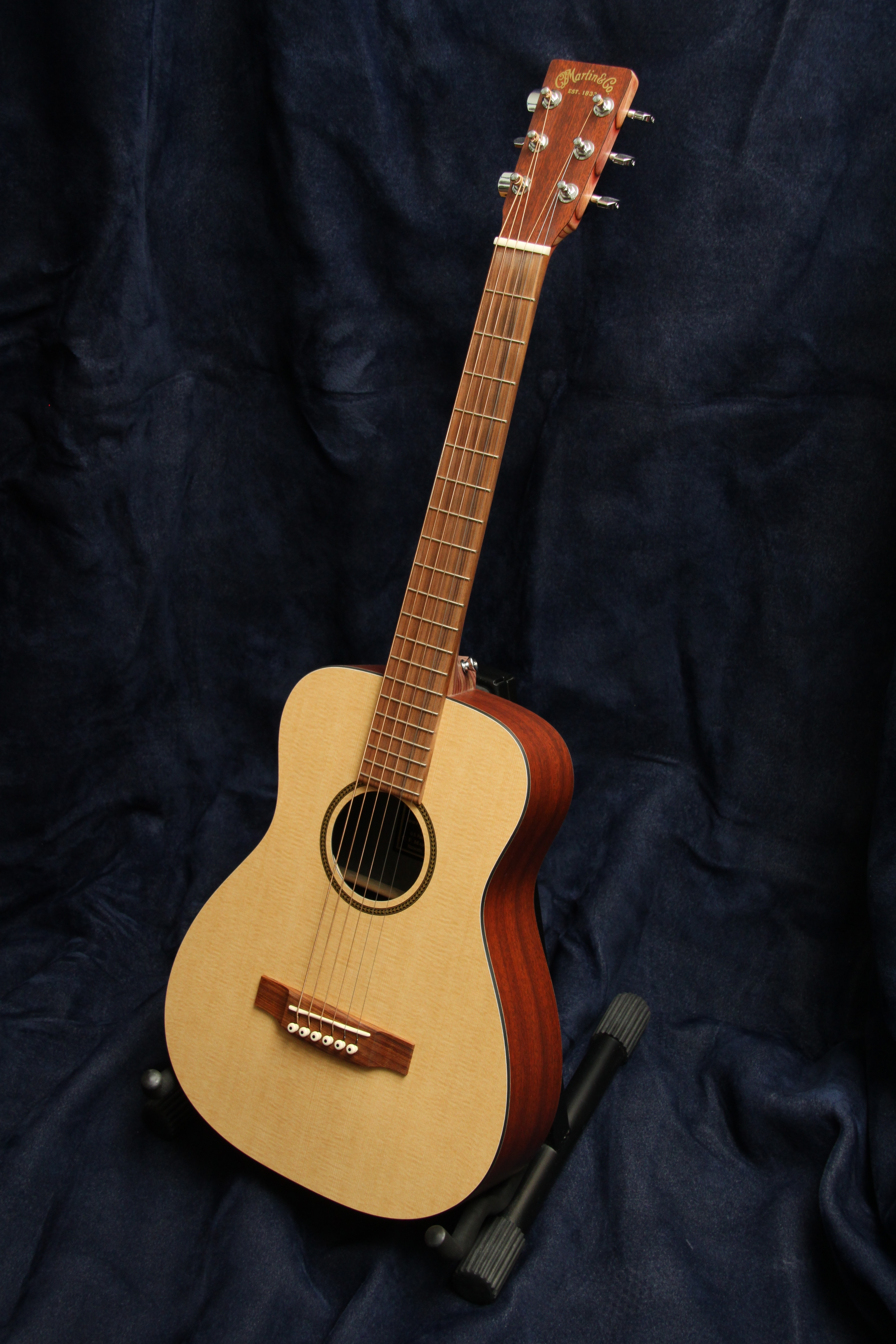
C. F. Martin Little Martin

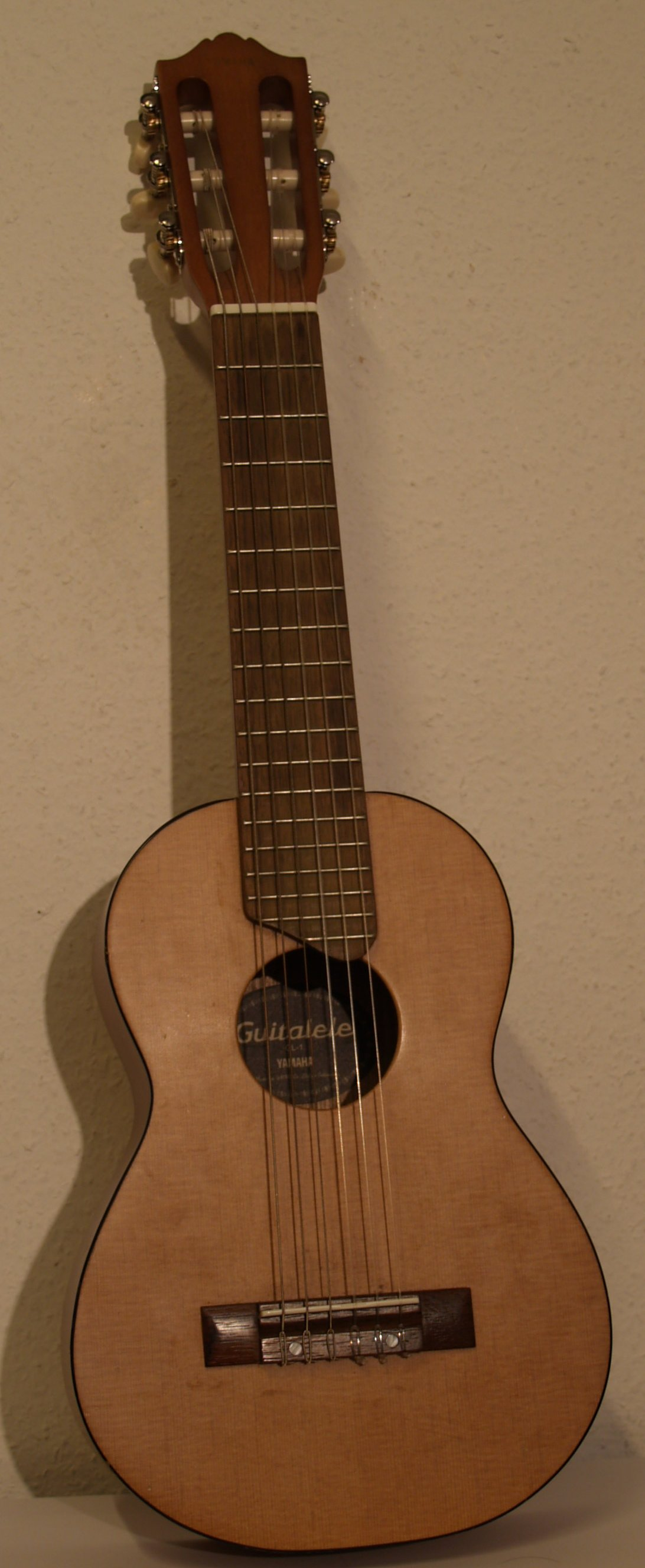
Yamaha Guitalele

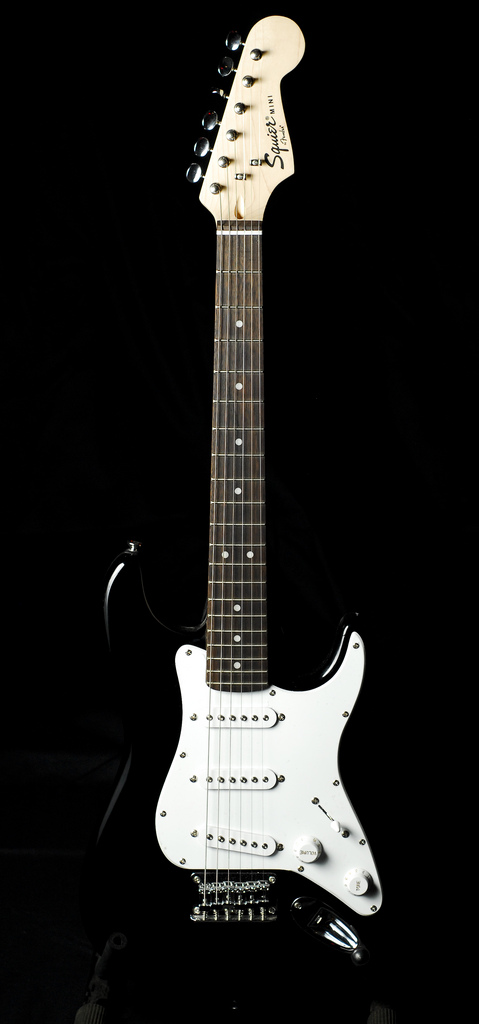
Squier Mini Stratocaster

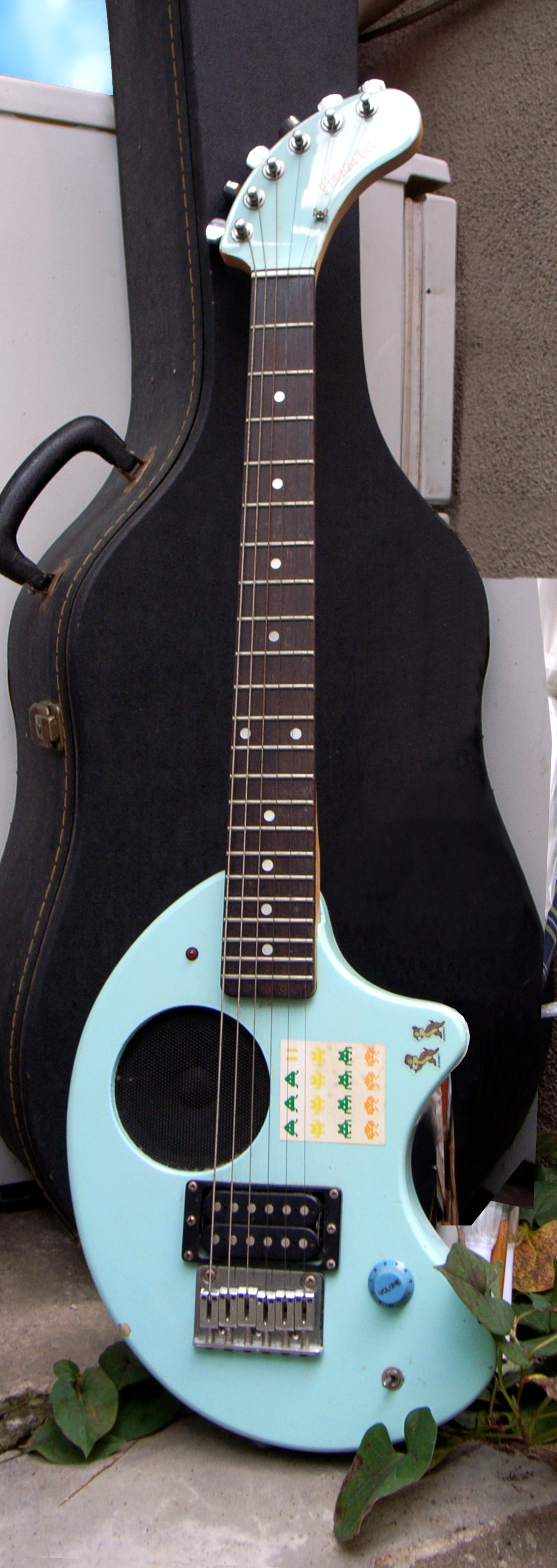
Fernandes ZO-3

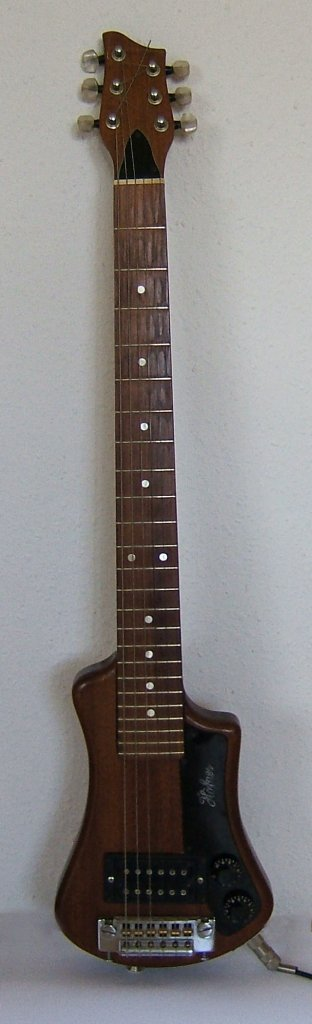
Höfner Shorty

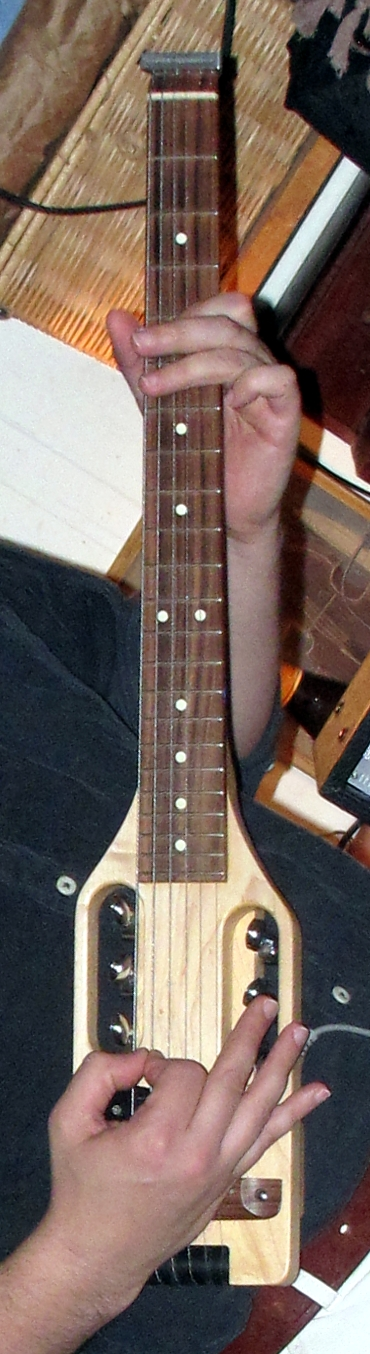
Traveler Guitar Pro Series

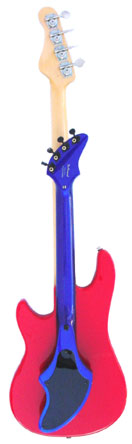
Ashbory bass compared with normal bass

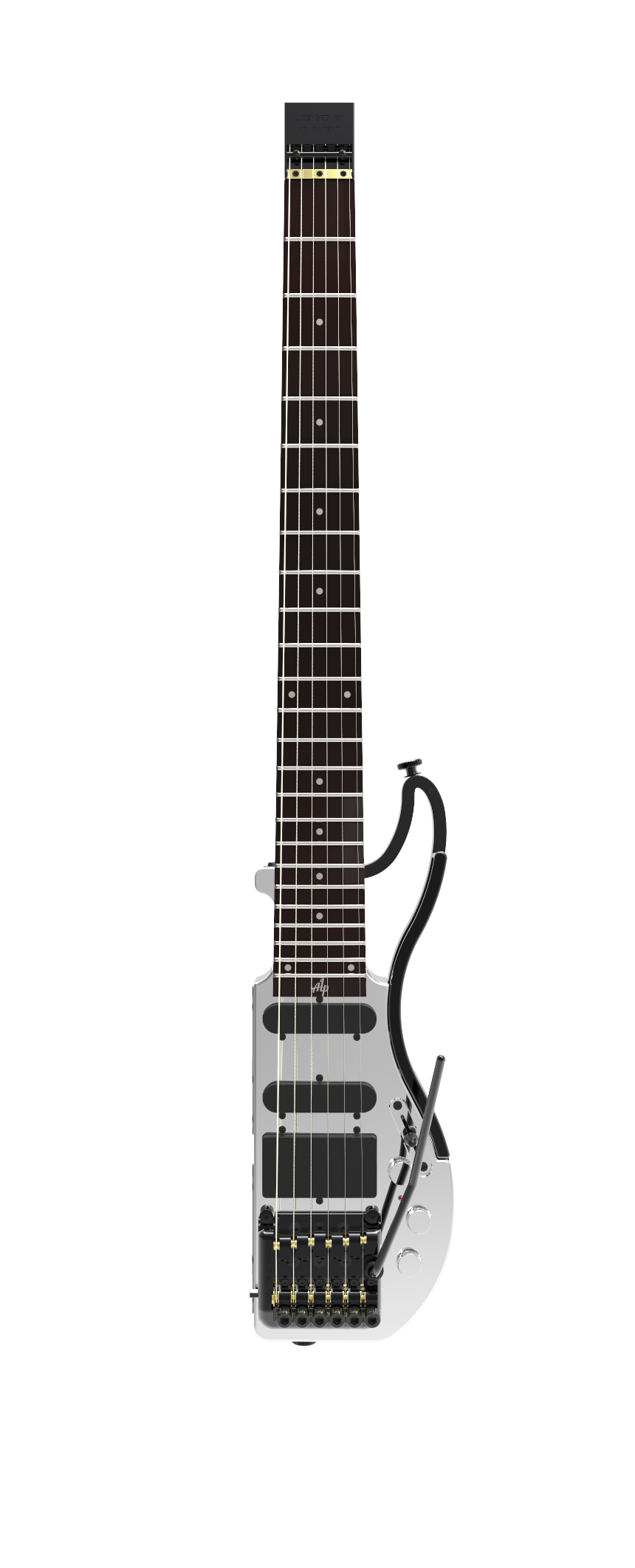
ALP Adventurer

== See also ==
- Parlor guitar — various small size guitars; historically, smaller than C. F. Martin Concert guitar (size 0) released in 1854; or in today, smaller than C. F. Martin Auditorium (size 000) or Orchestra Model guitar (size OM).
