= Skene, Sweden =

Coordinates: 57.490°N 12.642°E

Skene
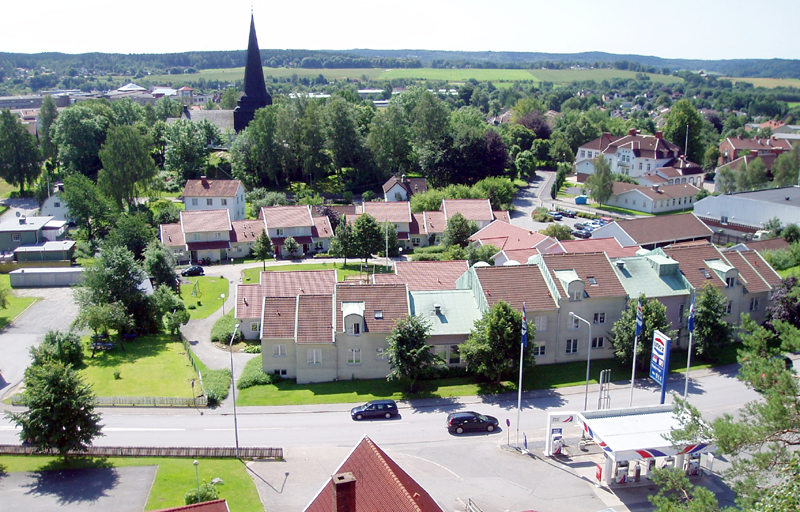

- Location within Västra Götaland Location within Sweden
- Country: Sweden
- Province: Västergötland
- County: Västra Götaland County
- Municipality: Mark Municipality
- Time zone: UTC+1 (CET)
  - Summer (DST): UTC+2 (CEST)

Skene (Swedish pronunciation: [ˈɧɛ̌ːnɛ]) is the second largest town in Mark Municipality, Västra Götaland County, Sweden. The area has about 5,800 inhabitants and was formerly a locality of its own, but has grown together with Kinna.

Skene is the home of sports club Skene IF.

== Notable natives ==
- Björklund, Jan Former party leader of the Liberals, Minister for Education, and Deputy Prime Minister of Sweden.
- Zackrisson, Hampus Swedish footballer.
