= MXTabs =

1999–2008 American music tablature website

- Website type: Tablature archive
- Website: www.mxtabs.net
- Commercial: Yes
- Registration: Optional
- Launched: 1999
- Current status: Defunct

MXTabs.net was an American music tablature website created in 1999, offering free guitar, bass, and drum tablature created by users of the site, in addition to music reviews and instrument lessons. Although the site shut down in June 2006 in response to claims made by the Music Publishers Association (MPA) about the supposed illegality of music tabs, it has since been bought by MusicNotes and now offers free, legal tablature.

The site was in public-alpha stage for some time as not all features had been added and tabs were available only to countries where a licence was in place. The site came out of public alpha stage and was launched on 1 July 2008. The site is now defunct and the domain name redirects to Songsterr, which has no relation to MXTabs.

== History ==
MXTabs was started as a hobby drum website in 1999. As the site grew in size and popularity, it added subsites for guitar and bass guitar. Users would submit tablature for a song, and that tab would be incorporated into the website. MXTabs continued to grow, increasing its database to over 150,000 tabs by December 2005, when the Music Publishers Association threatened websites that provided lyrics or tabs with jail time in addition to fines and shutting the websites down. The MPA took no legal action at that time, only warning that they would begin doing so in 2006. MXtabs responded on December 26, 2005 by taking their entire website offline. Later, the website was changed to simply forward viewers to its affiliate forum, MusicianForums.

On February 24, 2006, MXTabs was reinstated online by its owners, accompanied by an open letter explaining their belief in the site's mission to assist musicians in learning their instruments. The letter highlighted that MXTabs contributes up to $3000 monthly in sheet music sales and offers access to many tablatures for which no official sheet music exists, making it a unique resource for musicians seeking to learn specific songs. It also noted that tablatures have not been legally proven to be infringing and invited sheet music publishers to collaborate with MXTabs on establishing a licensing system for tabs. On June 25, 2006, MXtabs administrators removed the site's tablature content for a second time, after a reopening in February that year had failed to elicit the hoped-for response from the music publishing industry. Following this closure, the focus of the original MXTabs network pivoted towards webmaster Jeremy Ferwerda's review site, Sputnikmusic.

On March 27, 2007, MXTabs announced an agreement with the Harry Fox Agency, allowing for legal tabs in exchange for sharing ad revenue from the website. This deal also meant that tabs would be available for free to users, with MXTabs members contributing and refining the tablature content. Despite the anticipation of a summer 2007 reopening, MXTabs did not enter a private alpha phase until late in the year. The delay was attributed to challenges in securing contracts with the last few music publishers and the necessity of updating over 10,000 tabs to align with MXTabs' new operational model and incorporating desired features.

As of February 26, the site reopened with a new layout, although users in Canada encountered a message indicating licensing restrictions for certain songs. The site was operational in the United States, but some unlicensed songs prompted users to provide information to aid in obtaining licenses more quickly.

By May 9, tabs became available to users outside the United States, including Canada, United Kingdom and Australia, subject to licensing agreements. Following significant updates in May, including Tab Submissions and numerous new publisher agreements, MXTabs announced it would exit the public alpha stage and officially launch on July 1, 2008. The launch was celebrated with a promotion contest in partnership with Taylor Guitars.

On October 10, 2011, MXTabs.net ceased operations and redirected all its traffic to its partner site, Songsterr.com.

== See also ==
- Music Publishers Association
- On-line Guitar Archive
