= Fritsla =

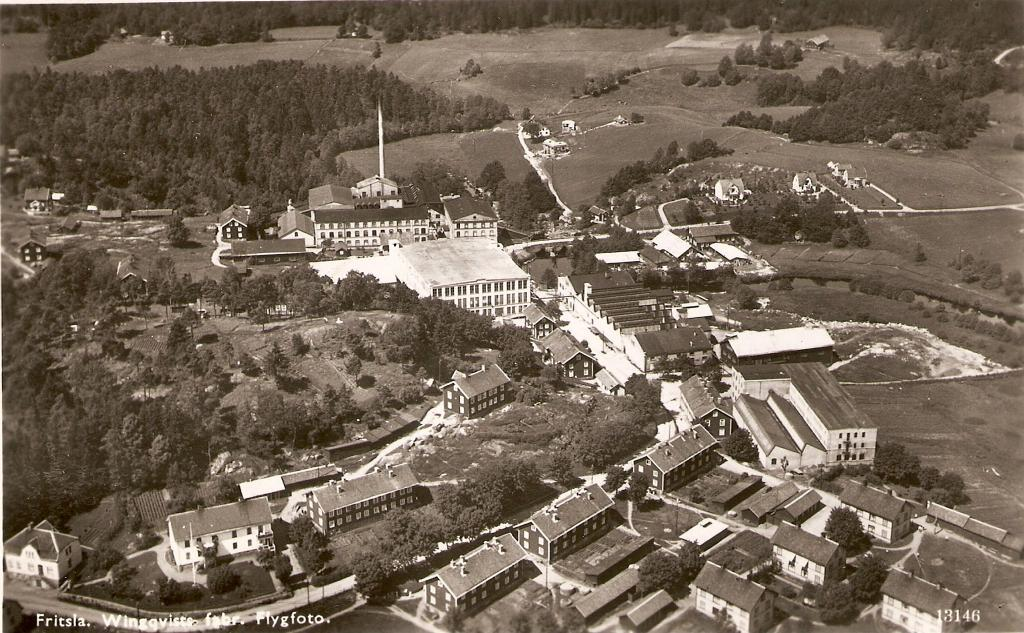

- Location within Västra Götaland Location within Sweden
- Coordinates: 57°33′N 12°47′E
- Country: Sweden
- Province: Västergötland
- County: Västra Götaland County
- Municipality: Mark Municipality

Area
  - Total: 3.27 km^{2} (1.26 sq mi)

Population (31 December 2010)
  - Total: 2,293
  - Density: 702/km^{2} (1,820/sq mi)
- Time zone: UTC+1 (CET)
  - Summer (DST): UTC+2 (CEST)

Fritsla is a locality situated in Mark Municipality, Västra Götaland County, Sweden. It had 2,293 inhabitants in 2010.

== Notable natives ==
- Arne Andersson (football player)
- Lena Andersson (singer)
- Yngve Brodd
- Sten-Åke Cederhök
- Gustaf Klarén
- Hjalmar Lundbohm
- Åke Söderblom
- America Vera-Zavala
