= Skene IF =

Swedish football club

- Full name: Skene Idrottsförening
- Founded: 1921
- Ground: Vävarevallen; Skene; Sweden
Home colours	Away colours

Skene IF is a Swedish football club in Skene in Mark Municipality, Västra Götaland County.

== Background ==
Skene Idrottsförening was founded in 1921 thanks to Borås Cotton who provided land for a football field. The club's first committee comprised Torsten Lydén, the club's first chairman, along with Knut Hultin and Sven Andersson. In 1942, again thanks to Borås Cotton, the Skene sports ground was developed into a fully modern facility with the new name Vävarevallen.

Since their foundation Skene IF has participated mainly in the middle divisions of the Swedish football league system. The club currently plays in Division 3 Mellersta Götaland which is the fifth tier of Swedish football but have finished in a relegation position. They play their home matches at the Vävarevallen in Skene. The home match against Viken in 1948 was attended by 2,120 spectators but the attendance record for a football match at Vävarevallen was set in 2003 when 2,259 attended the youth international match between Sweden and England.

Skene IF are affiliated to the Västergötlands Fotbollförbund.

== Season to season ==
Season	Level	Division	Section	Position	Movements
1993	Tier 5	Division 4	Västergötland Södra	3rd	
1994	Tier 5	Division 4	Västergötland Södra	2nd	Promotion Playoffs
1995	Tier 5	Division 4	Västergötland Södra	1st	Promoted
1996	Tier 4	Division 3	Sydvästra Götaland	3rd	
1997	Tier 4	Division 3	Sydvästra Götaland	1st	Promoted
1998	Tier 3	Division 2	Södra Götaland	8th	
1999	Tier 3	Division 2	Västra Götaland	4th	
2000	Tier 3	Division 2	Västra Götaland	7th	
2001	Tier 3	Division 2	Västra Götaland	11th	
2002	Tier 4	Division 3	Sydvästra Götaland	1st	Promoted
2003	Tier 3	Division 2	Östra Götaland	10th	Relegation Playoffs
2004	Tier 3	Division 2	Västra Götaland	10th	Relegation Playoffs
2005	Tier 3	Division 2	Mellersta Götaland	10th	
2006*	Tier 4	Division 2	Västra Götaland	7th	
2007	Tier 4	Division 2	Västra Götaland	12th	Relegated
2008	Tier 5	Division 3	Sydvästra Götaland	2nd	Promotion Playoffs
2009	Tier 5	Division 3	Mellersta Götaland	8th	
2010	Tier 5	Division 3	Mellersta Götaland	11th	Relegated
2011	Tier 6	Division 4	Västergötland Södra		

* League restructuring in 2006 resulted in a new division being created at Tier 3 and subsequent divisions dropping a level.

== Attendances ==
In recent seasons Skene IF have had the following average attendances:

Season	Average attendance	Division / Section	Level
2005	339	Div 2 Mellersta Götaland	Tier 3
2006	316	Div 2 Västra Götaland	Tier 4
2007	236	Div 2 Västra Götaland	Tier 4
2008	147	Div 3 Nordvästra Götaland	Tier 5
2009	148	Div 3 Mellersta Götaland	Tier 5
2010	108	Div 3 Mellersta Götaland	Tier 5

* Attendances are provided in the Publikliga sections of the Svenska Fotbollförbundet website.
