= Uppsala International Guitar Festival =

Music festival in Sweden

- Genre: Guitar music
- Location(s): Uppsala, Sweden
- Years active: 2003-present
- Attendance: 6,000+
- Website: Uppsala International Guitar Festival

Uppsala International Guitar Festival (Swedish:Uppsala internationella gitarrfestival) is an annual music festival in Uppsala, Sweden. The festival was founded in 2003 and was then attended by 200 persons, but had by 2010 grown to more than 6,000 visitors, and 300 performers. The festival includes concerts, seminars, workshops and a guitar fair, and the main activities of the festival are housed in the main concert hall Uppsala Konsert & Kongress.

The festival emphasises international musicians notable performers include Al Di Meola, Paco de Lucía, John McLaughlin and Göran Söllscher. Recurring acts include John Williams and the family Sérgio, Odair, and Badi Assad. Another recurring act is the concert by young talents, where guitarists younger than 25 are welcome to perform regardless of genre. Since 2011 the festival includes a three-day pre-festival, focusing on local talents, thus making the entire festival one full week.
