= Kinna =

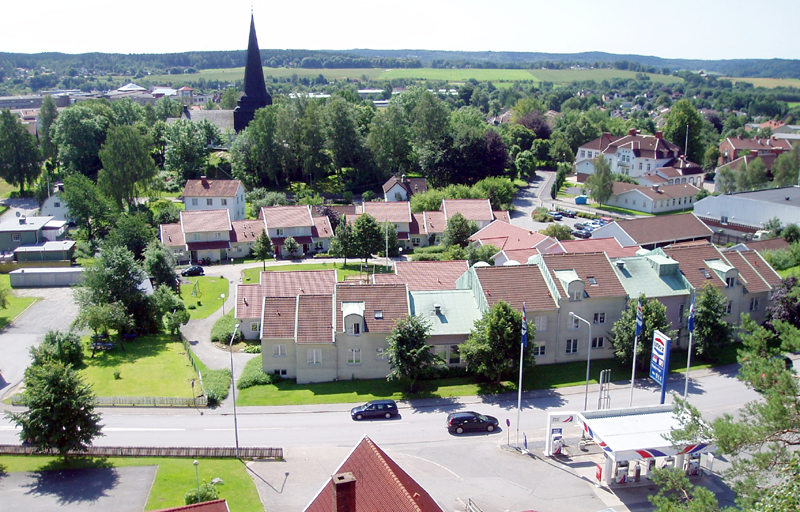
- View over Skene (the urban district of Kinna)

- Location within Västra Götaland Location within Sweden
- Coordinates: 57°31′N 12°41′E
- Country: Sweden
- Province: Västergötland
- County: Västra Götaland County
- Municipality: Mark Municipality

Area
  - Total: 14.24 km^{2} (5.50 sq mi)
- Elevation: 53 m (174 ft)

Population (31 December 2010)
  - Total: 14,776
  - Density: 1,038/km^{2} (2,690/sq mi)
- Time zone: UTC+1 (CET)
  - Summer (DST): UTC+2 (CEST)

Kinna is a locality and the seat of Mark Municipality, Västra Götaland County, Sweden. It had 14,776 inhabitants in 2010.

Kinna is located 30 kilometres (19 miles) south of Borås and 60 kilometres (37 miles) south east of Gothenburg. The original Kinna has grown together with surrounding Skene and Örby making up the present locality.

== People from Kinna ==
- Jonas Jerebko, professional basketball player, second Swedish-born player to ever be selected in the NBA draft
- Michael Jernberg, rallycross driver
- Mor Kerstin i Stämmemand-Kinna
- Oskar Palmquist, playing for Rutgers University Basketball Team
- Gabriella Quevedo
