= Mark Municipality =

Mark Municipality Marks kommun
- Municipality
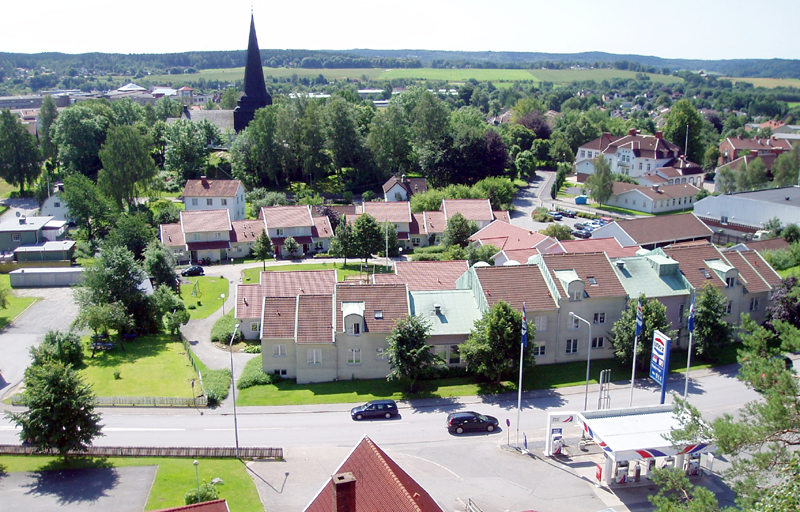
- View over Skene (the urban district of Kinna).

- Coat of arms
- Nickname: Tygriket "The Fabric Kingdom"
- Coordinates: 57°31′N 12°41′E
- Country: Sweden
- County: Västra Götaland County
- Established in: 1971
- Seat: Kinna

Area
  - Total: 1,013.2 km^{2} (391.2 sq mi)
  - Land: 929.25 km^{2} (358.79 sq mi)
  - Water: 83.95 km^{2} (32.41 sq mi)
- Area as of 1 January 2014.

Population (30 June 2025)
  - Total: 35,223
  - Density: 37.905/km^{2} (98.173/sq mi)
- Demonym: Markbo
- Time zone: UTC+1 (CET)
  - Summer (DST): UTC+2 (CEST)
- Postal code: 43499 -to- 51997
- Area code: 0320
- ISO 3166 code: SE
- Province: Västergötland
- Municipal code: 1463
- Website: www.mark.se

Mark Municipality (Swedish: Marks kommun) is a municipality in Västra Götaland County in southwest Sweden.

The municipal seat is located in the center of Kinna town.

The municipality was created through the Municipal Reform Act of 1971 by the amalgamation of eight smaller municipal entities.

== Coat of arms ==
The coat of arms was created and granted with the municipality in 1974. The colours of Gold and Black on the shield represent power and solidity.

The grain represents the history of agriculture in the region.

The circles symbolise four cannonballs, representing the wars fought between Denmark and Sweden in the greater Mark region.

The weaver's shuttle-tool represents the historical tradition of textile workmanship in the region, which the region is famous for nationwide.

== History ==
=== Medieval times ===
The word Mark comes from an old documented district called Mark Härad that existed in the southern parts of the region sometime during the 13th century.

The word Mark is believed to be an old Swedish name for "border" or "edge". During the medieval times the district of Mark Härad (now Mark municipality) was situated right at the border region between the Kingdom of Denmark and Kingdom of Sweden.

Several wars were fought in the region during medieval times, and it is not uncommon that farmers accidentally unearth old remains and weapons when plowing the fields.

The fields close to Öresten Fortress have been the place for most of the relic findings. Öresten Fortress was originally built by the Danes, and the first documented nobleman to rule and inhabit the fortress was Tyge Puder (1364-1384/86). The fortress was conquered by the Swedish army during the battle of Öresten in 1470 when the Danish king Kristian the First lost the battle against Sten Sture the Elder

The fortress was later destroyed in early 1500 and is now a protected historical sight open to the public year-round.

In 1682, as a sign of the times, the local governance established a place of execution outside Skene village called Galgbacken (eng: The hill of hanging). Thieves were executed there as well as those judged as witches were burned on the stake. In 1934 archeologists found the buried remains of those that were executed.

=== The Industrial Revolution ===
The Mark region was the cradle of Sweden's textile industry and has since the late 18th century been known as the Fabric Kingdom due to the widespread textile workmanship that comes from the region. It was from Mark that several of the nationwide travelling salesmen were based, spreading high-quality fabric manufacturing throughout the county. The region later evolved into a national industrial center for sewing, dyeing and textile manufacturing after the industrial revolution.

The biggest textile factories of the time was Kungsfors Textilfabrik in central Skene, Fritsla Textilfabrik in Fritsla, Rydal Textilfabrik in Rydal. As of 2014 none of those factories remain in use but the old factory in Rydal has been converted into a museum for the regions textile and entrepreneur heritage.

=== Modern era ===
In 1971 Mark Municipality was created out of a consolidation of eight smaller municipalities. The common name given to the municipality was Mark, signifying the historical events taken place which is also manifested in its shield.

During the early 1980s most of the textile factories had disappeared and only a few remained.

Today there are only three major textile and dyeing factories remaining: Almedahls (central Kinna), Ekelund (central Horred), Ludvig Svensson (outskirts of Kinna).

Throughout Mark municipality the textile heritage has been preserved and the region is famous for its textile "know-how" and specialist production. The region is home to Sweden's largest manufacturer of fire hoses, bulletproof materials and filtering equipment.

== Roads and communications ==
Mark Municipality has excellent roads, rail and public transport links to the major cities in the country.

Within 1 hour it is possible to travel to Gothenburg (swe: Göteborg - Sweden's 2nd largest city) by car or bus from the stations in Kinna and Skene.

=== Major roads ===
- Road R156 - west to Göteborg (eng:Gothenburg) / east to Svenljunga.
- Road R41 - north to Borås / south to Varberg.

=== Public transport (bus & train) ===
All public transport options are trafficked by the regional Västtrafik (eng: West traffic) company.

- Bus 300 & 430 on the West-East route Gothenburg-Sätila-Skene-Kinna.
- Bus 450 on the Northern route Skene-Borås.
- Train on Viskadalsbanan between Varberg and Borås with stops in Horred, Björketorp, Berghem, Skene, Assberg, Kinna & Fritsla.

== Towns and villages ==
=== Major towns ===
- Kinna (municipal seat)

=== Minor towns ===
- Örby
- Fritsla

=== Villages ===
- Berghem
- Björketorp
- Fotskäl
- Haby
- Hajom
- Horred
- Hyssna
- Istorp
- Kinnaström
- Rydal
- Skephult
- Sätila
- Torestorp
- Tostared
- Älekulla
- Öxabäck

=== International sister cities ===
Mark Municipality has three sister cities. The Municipality has been focusing on finding sister cities that shares a tradition in textile manufacturing.

- Apolda (Germany) - since 1994.
- Szamotuły (Poland) - since 1988. Friendly ties were created because of the awakened awareness of nuclear power in Szamotuły, who wanted contacts with Swedish cities because of Sweden's ongoing nuclear debates.
- Ontinyent (Spain) - since 2003.

== Demographics ==
This is a demographic table based on Mark Municipality's electoral districts in the 2022 Swedish general election sourced from SVT's election platform, in turn taken from SCB official statistics.

In total there were 35,169 residents, including 26,700 Swedish citizens of voting age. 46.9% voted for the left coalition and 51.4% for the right coalition. Indicators are in percentage points except population totals and income.

Location	Residents	Citizen adults	Left vote	Right vote	Employed	Swedish parents	Foreign heritage	Income SEK	Degree
Location			%	%					
Berghem-Hajom	1,551	1,211	42.5	55.9	86	89	11	26,384	33
Fotskäl-Tostared	2,242	1,702	37.6	60.8	84	85	15	25,197	27
Fritsla	1,469	1,084	48.5	49.6	73	77	23	21,190	31
Horred-Öxnevalla	2,491	1,905	42.8	54.3	84	89	11	24,357	31
Hyssna	1,969	1,508	43.4	55.4	87	91	9	27,809	40
Kinna-Aspäng	1,745	1,243	60.0	38.2	73	65	35	19,969	25
Kinna C	1,567	1,301	48.9	49.3	79	81	19	23,471	36
Kinna-Marieberg	1,577	1,234	47.1	51.9	86	84	16	27,562	37
Kinna-Näs-Vallås	1,909	1,462	47.7	50.8	86	82	18	26,478	35
Kinna-Rydal	1,613	1,216	48.9	49.6	84	85	15	26,985	34
Skene-Assberg	2,015	1,434	55.0	42.9	66	60	40	18,702	21
Skene-Hedbo	1,912	1,337	55.7	42.3	74	61	39	21,646	31
Skene-Sandvallsäng	2,061	1,533	52.7	45.5	82	76	24	25,660	33
Skephult-Fritsla	1,334	1,026	47.7	50.9	86	90	10	26,271	35
Sätila	2,451	1,916	46.3	52.3	88	90	10	28,050	42
Torestorp-Öxabäck	2,212	1,712	44.2	54.3	85	90	10	24,448	24
Ubbhult-Sätila	1,609	1,210	40.7	57.0	87	87	13	29,402	37
Örby C	1,754	1,375	48.2	51.2	87	88	12	26,934	37
Örby-Krok	1,688	1,291	43.7	54.6	89	92	8	28,121	37
Source: SVT

== Bordering municipalities ==
- To the east: Svenljunga Municipality
- To the north: Bollebyggd Municipality, Borås Municipality, Härryda Municipality
- To the south: Varberg Municipality (Halland County)
- To the west: Kungsbacka Municipality (Halland County)

== Sports and pastimes ==
There are over 60 major sporting and pastime clubs throughout Mark Municipality. The major ones are:

=== Clubs ===
Name (Hometown / Year - Field)

- Fotskäl Hockey Club (Fotskäl / 1972 - Icehockey)
- Skene IF (Skene / XXXX - Soccer)
- Skene SoIS (Skene / XXXX - Swimming & Orientation & General athletics)
- Kinna IF (Kinna / 1922 - Soccer & Orientation)
- Skene Motorsällskap (Skene / 1955 - Rallycross & Motocross)
- Marks Amatörradio Klubb "SK6BA" (Skene / 1991 - Ham radio)
- Marks GK (Kinna / 1962 - Golf)
- Marbo BK (Kinna / 1969 - Basketball)
- Sätila SK (Sätila/ 1928 - Football)
