= Taylor Guitars =

American guitar manufacturer

- Type: Private, employee-owned
- Industry: Musical instrument manufacturing
- Founded: 1974; 52 years ago
- Founder: Bob Taylor and Kurt Listug
- Headquarters: El Cajon, California, United States
- Area served: Worldwide
- Key people: Andy Powers (CEO); Geoff Smith (CFO)
- Products: Acoustic, classical and electric guitars
- Number of employees: 750 worldwide
- Website: www.taylorguitars.com

Taylor Guitars is an American guitar manufacturer based in El Cajon, California. The company was founded in 1974 by Bob Taylor and Kurt Listug, specializing in acoustic guitars and semi-hollow electric guitars. It is one of the largest manufacturers of acoustic guitars in the United States and sells guitars in 65 countries around the world.

== History ==
Bob Taylor, aged 18 in 1972, began working at a guitar-making shop owned by Sam Radding called American Dream, where Kurt Listug was employed. Radding sold the business in 1974 and Taylor, Listug, and a third employee, Steve Schemmer, bought American Dream and renamed it the Westland Music Company.

Needing a compact logo for the guitars' headstock, they changed the name to Taylor, which they thought sounded more American than Listug. Kurt Listug said, "Bob was the real guitar-maker." Listug became the partnership's businessman and Taylor handled design and production. They began selling their guitars through retailers in 1976. In 1981, facing financial difficulties, Taylor Guitars took out a bank loan to purchase equipment.

By 2012, Taylor Guitars had more than 700 employees in two factories; in El Cajon, California, and in Tecate, Mexico, where lower-priced models and guitar cases were made. In early 2011, the company opened a Taylor distribution warehouse in the Netherlands to serve the European market. In January 2014, the U.S. State Department honored Taylor Guitars with an Award for Corporate Excellence (ACE), citing the company's commitment to responsible practices in obtaining ebony for its instruments, which included purchasing a sustainable ebony mill and increasing its output of usable timber from 10% to 100%.

On January 1, 2021, the company became fully employee-owned. In May 2022, Andy Powers was made CEO, President, and Chief Guitar Designer of the company.

== Innovations ==
Taylor is a forward-thinking company that produces some of the finest six-strings available today. Recognized as a flat-top trailblazer with strong and passionate views on sustainability, Taylor offers modern players a contemporary guitar that feels and sounds just as good as it looks. Taylor is beloved for their crisp, contemporary tone. These guitars deliver a singing upper mid-range that can cut through even the densest of mixes.

— Daryl Robertson of Guitar World (May 24, 2023)

In 1995, Bob Taylor became interested in finding out whether using exotic tonewoods in quality guitars was more important than luthier techniques and good design. He built a Dreadnought guitar's back and sides with oak from shipping pallets he found at the factory, used a nondescript piece of 2x4 timber for its top, and made of neck out of pallet oak. The fretboard's Formica-and-pearl inlay depicted a fork lift. He named the resulting instrument the "Pallet Guitar", and in 2000 a limited edition of 25 Grand Auditorium-bodied Pallet Guitars were made, with aluminum inlay included to accentuate the original nail holes in the wood. These guitars were sold to collectors, but the first Pallet Guitar remains on display at the Taylor Guitars factory in El Cajon, California.

Taylor acoustic models
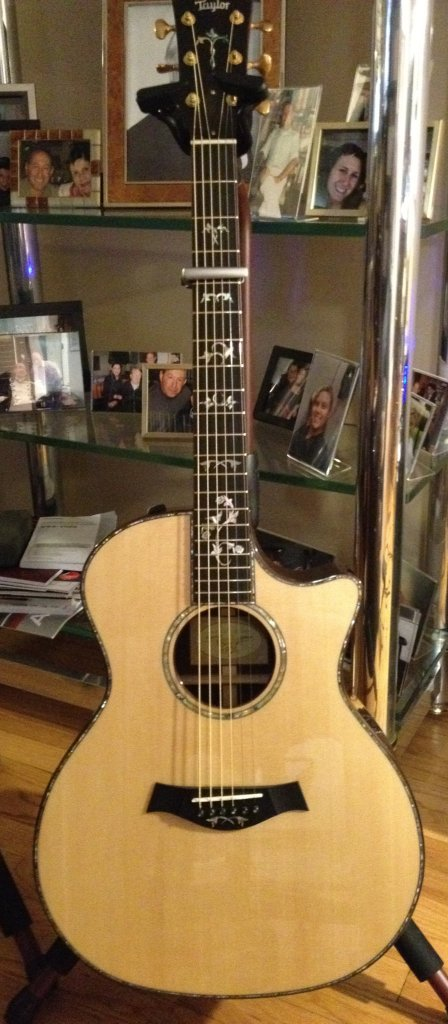
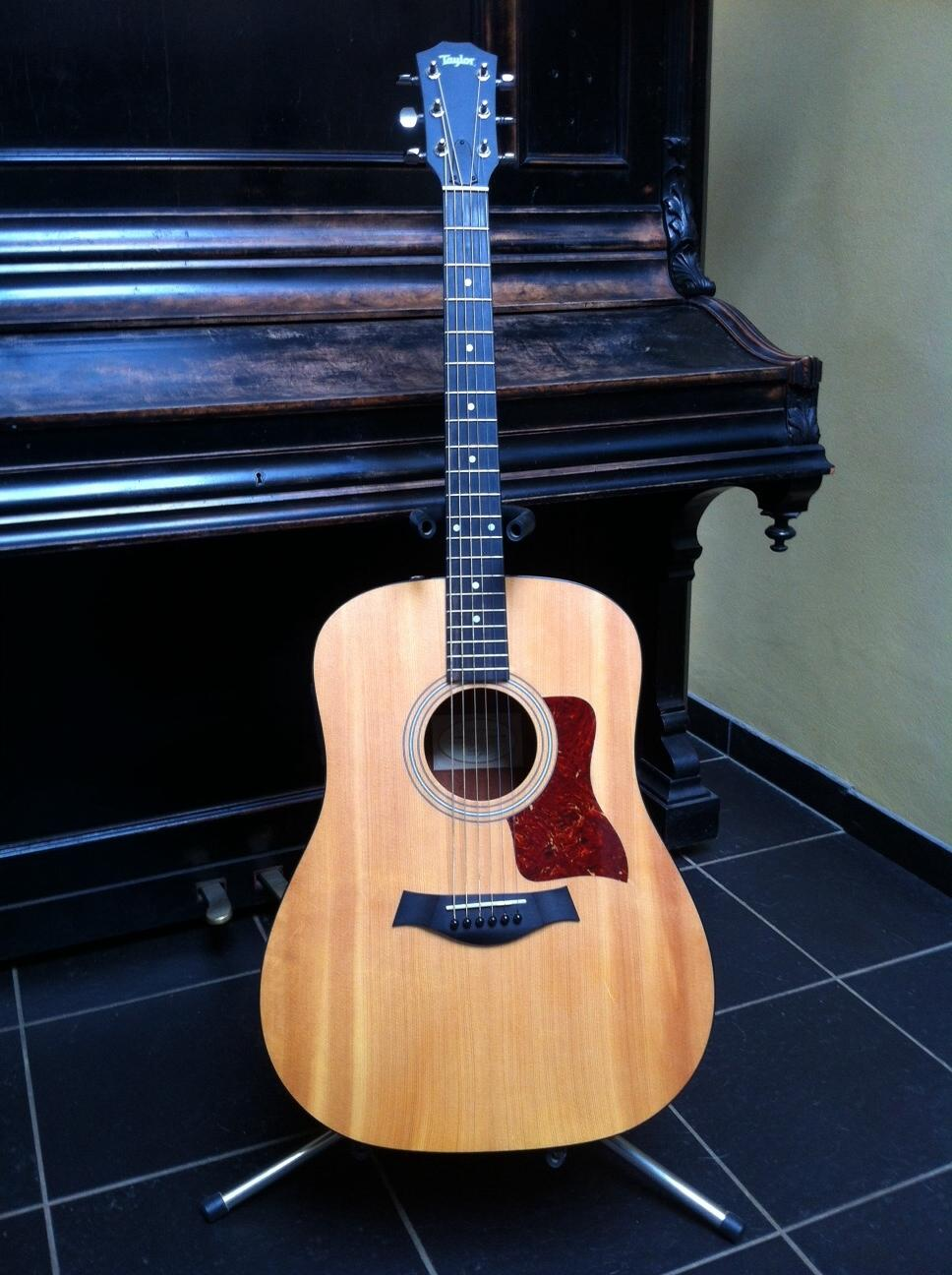
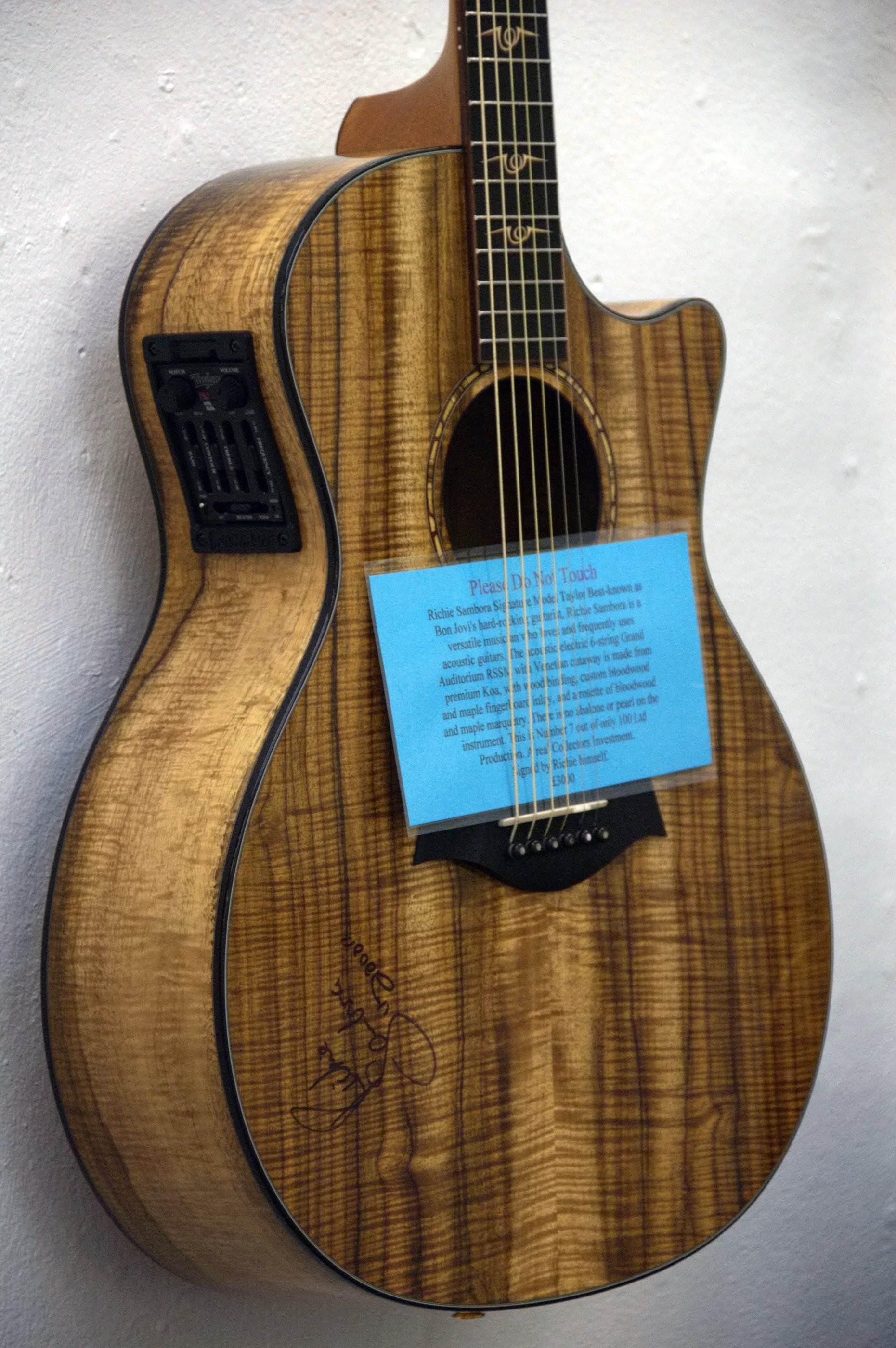
Fltr: 914, 01A, Richie Sambora signature

In January 1999, Taylor began making guitars with a patented, bolt-on neck called the NT (new technology) neck. This differed from conventional guitar necks in using one continuous piece of wood from the headstock to the 19th fret to support the fretboard. The usual practice in guitar neck construction was to support the fretboard up to the fourteenth fret and glue the unsupported remaining length to the soundboard. The NT neck fitted into a slot on top of the guitar body, achieving the desired angle with small shims. Guitars sometimes require neck angle realignment (neck reset), and the NT system achieved this by changing shims. Prior to 1999, Taylor Guitars had a simple bolt-on neck design which could be adjusted without the complex process of ungluing the neck joint.

Taylor factory
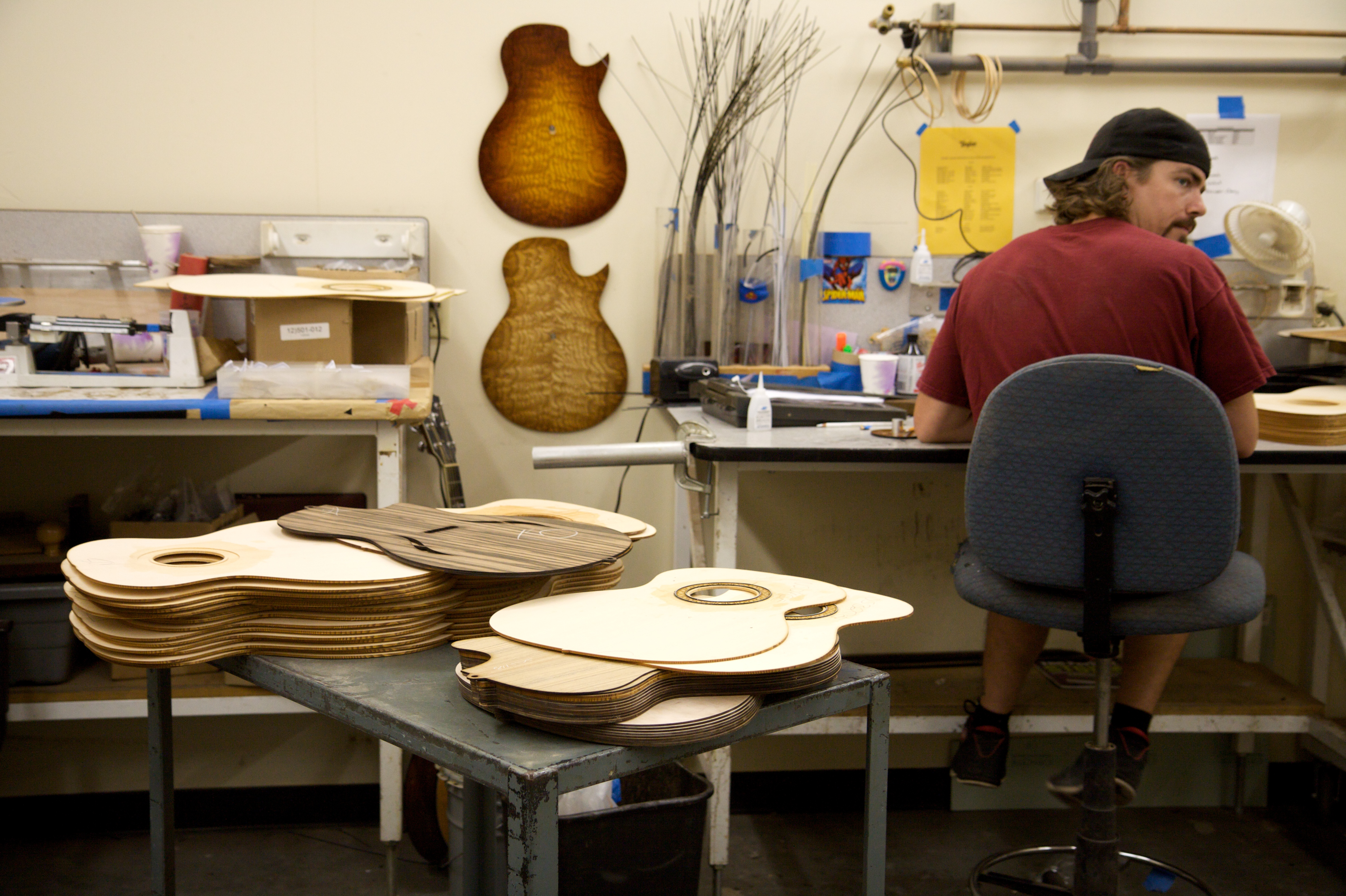
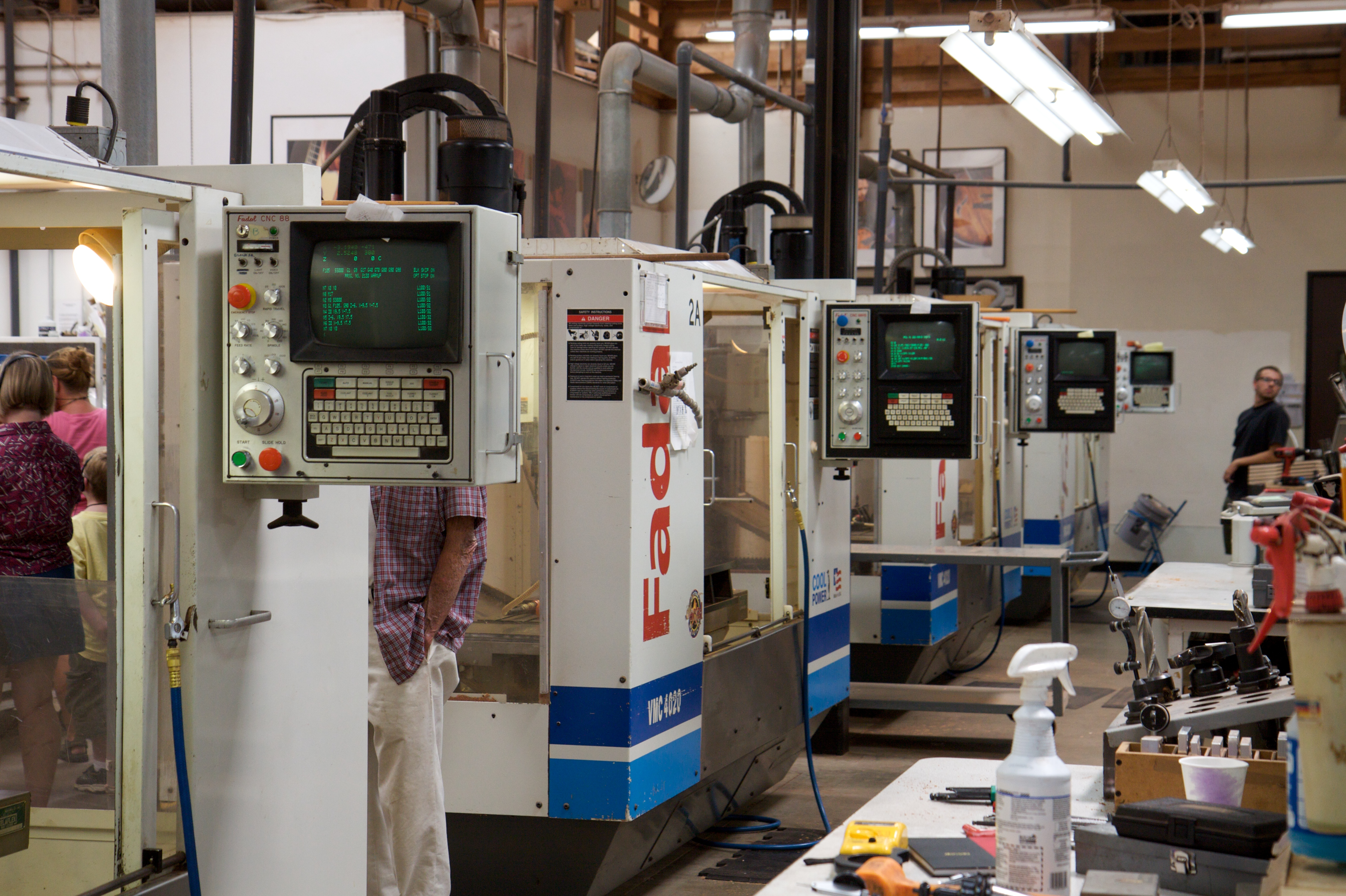
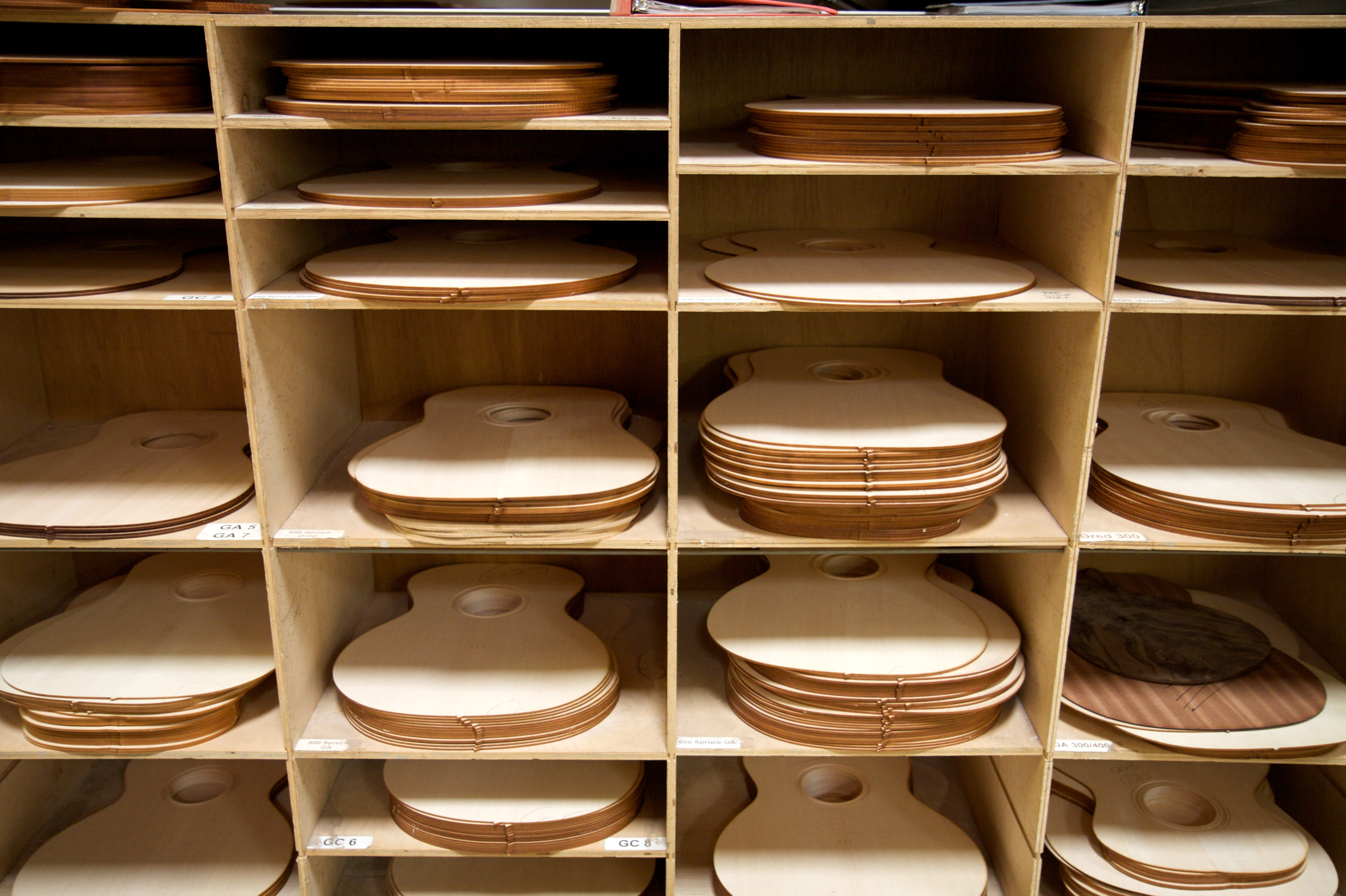
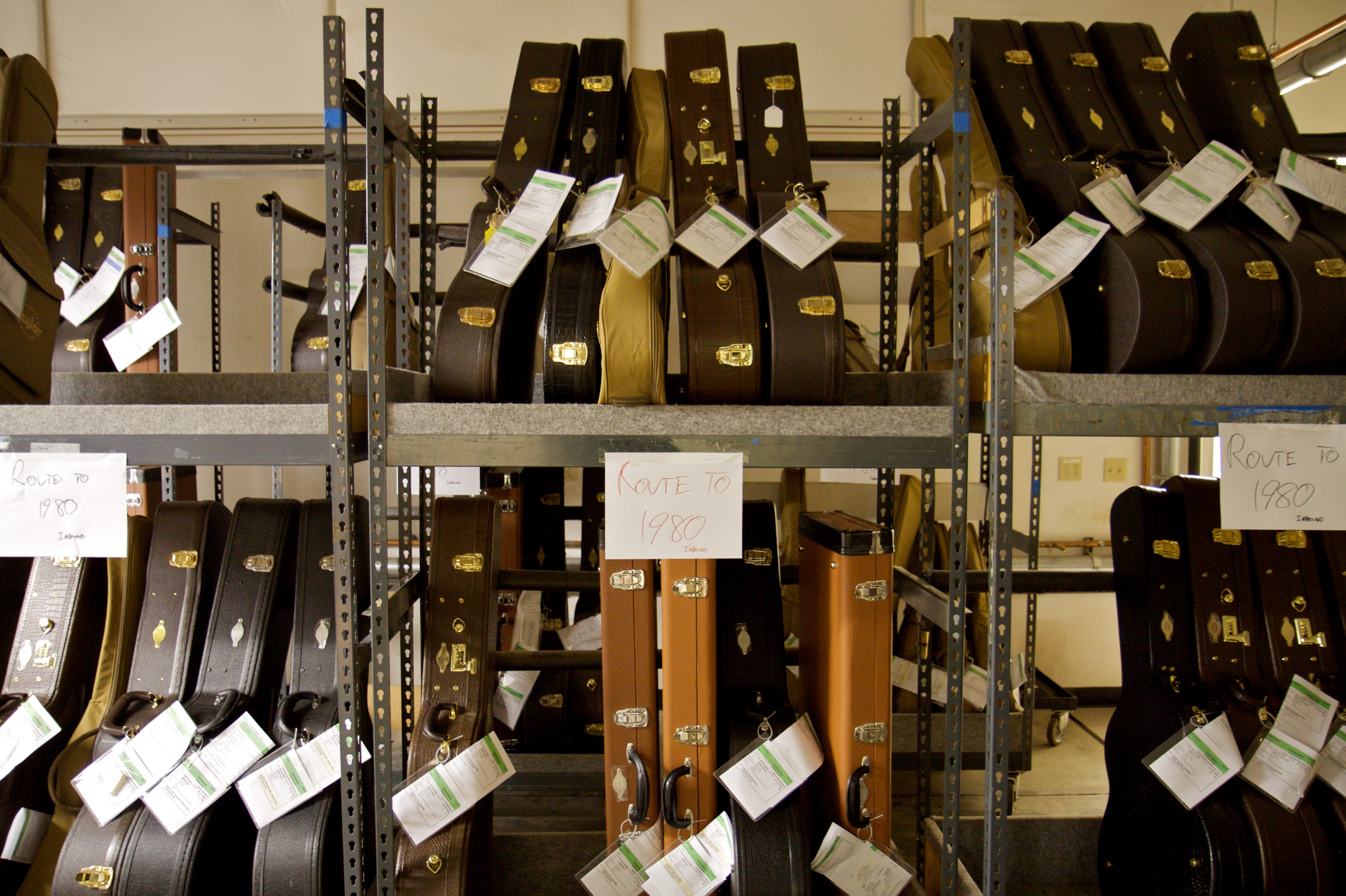
Fltr: interior view, machines, bodies in process, ready for delivery

The Taylor company uses its own pickup, the "Expression System", which is a humbucking induction pickup mounted in the neck, and a pair of dynamic soundboard transducers wired to an onboard preamplifier, designed by Rupert Neve. The entry-level 100 and 200 series of guitars have an externally similar system, known as ES-T, which uses a single under-saddle pickup and no soundboard transducers. The first-generation ES system was introduced in 2004. It had two transducers, one mounted to the bridge and the other on the lower bout of the sound board, with a small, single-coil pickup mounted in the neck joint, all wired to the onboard preamp, which had knobs for volume, tone and blend. This early ES system was available on the higher-end 500 series and above, as well as the 30th-anniversary limited-edition series, starting in the fall of 2004. It was a custom order for the 300 and 400 series, and could be retrofitted to some older Taylor guitars with the NT neck design.

In 2018, Taylor introduced their V-Class bracing on their Grand Concert and larger bodies, providing a better intonation compared to traditional X bracing. For their smaller guitars, a modified pattern called C-Class was made to provide similar benefits in a smaller, space limited area.

In 2025 with their Gold Label series, Taylor introduced the Action Control Neck system, which allows on the fly adjustment of the neck angle by the user without requiring a luthier to remove and adjust the neck with shims like their previous NT neck system.

== Factory ==
Taylor's 145,000-square-foot manufacturing facility is located in El Cajon, California, about 20 miles east of downtown San Diego. A free guided tour of the Taylor Guitars factory is open to the public at 1:00 p.m., Monday through Friday except some holidays. Premier Guitars published a four-part tour of the Taylor Factory, narrated by Bob Taylor, in 2008.

== Notable players ==
- William Ackerman
- Axel Bauer
- Jade Bird
- Dave Carroll
- Steven Curtis Chapman
- Richard Dawson
- Russ Freeman
- Vic Fuentes
- Michael Hedges
- Jewel
- Leo Kottke
- Dave Matthews
- Jason Mraz
- Dolores O'Riordan
- Gabriella Quevedo
- Steve Stevens
- Taylor Swift
- Snuffy Walden
- Billy Joe Walker
