= Gender and development =

Field of research and study

Gender and development is an interdisciplinary field of research and applied study that implements a feminist approach to understanding and addressing the disparate impact that economic development and globalization have on people based upon their location, gender, class background, and other socio-political identities. A strictly economic approach to development views a country's development in quantitative terms such as job creation, inflation control, and high employment – all of which aim to improve the "economic wellbeing" of a country and the subsequent quality of life for its people. In terms of economic development, quality of life is defined as access to necessary rights and resources including but not limited to quality education, medical facilities, affordable housing, clean environments, and low crime rate. Gender and development considers many of these same factors; however, gender and development emphasizes efforts towards understanding how multifaceted these issues are in the entangled context of culture, government, and globalization. Accounting for this need, gender and development implements ethnographic research, research that studies a specific culture or group of people by physically immersing the researcher into the environment and daily routine of those being studied, in order to comprehensively understand how development policy and practices affect the everyday life of targeted groups or areas.

The history of this field dates back to the 1950s, when studies of economic development first brought women into its discourse, focusing on women only as subjects of welfare policies – notably those centered on food aid and family planning. The focus of women in development increased throughout the decade, and by 1962, the United Nations General Assembly called for the Commission on the Status of Women to collaborate with the Secretary General and a number of other UN sectors to develop a longstanding program dedicated to women's advancement in developing countries. A decade later, feminist economist Ester Boserup's pioneering book Women's Role in Economic Development (1970) was published, radically shifting perspectives of development and contributing to the birth of what eventually became the gender and development field.

Since Boserup's consider that development affects men and women differently, the study of gender's relation to development has gathered major interest amongst scholars and international policymakers. The field has undergone major theoretical shifts, beginning with Women in Development (WID), shifting to Women and Development (WAD), and finally becoming the contemporary Gender and Development (GAD). Each of these frameworks emerged as an evolution of its predecessor, aiming to encompass a broader range of topics and social science perspectives. In addition to these frameworks, international financial institutions such as the World Bank and the International Monetary Fund (IMF) have implemented policies, programs, and research regarding gender and development, contributing a neoliberal and smart economics approach to the study. Examples of these policies and programs include Structural Adjustment Programs (SAPs), microfinance, outsourcing, and privatizing public enterprises, all of which direct focus towards economic growth and suggest that advancement towards gender equality will follow. These approaches have been challenged by alternative perspectives such as Marxism and ecofeminism, which respectively reject international capitalism and the gendered exploitation of the environment via science, technology, and capitalist production. Marxist perspectives of development advocate for the redistribution of wealth and power in efforts to reduce global labor exploitation and class inequalities, while ecofeminist perspectives confront industrial practices that accompany development, including deforestation, pollution, environmental degradation, and ecosystem destruction.

== Gender roles in childhood development ==
=== Introduction ===
Gender identity formation in early childhood is an important aspect of child development, shaping how individuals see themselves and others in terms of gender (Martin & Ruble, 2010). It encompasses the understanding and internalization of societal norms, roles, and expectations associated with a specific gender. As time progresses, there becomes more outlets for these gender roles to be influenced due to the increase outlets of new media. This developmental process begins early and is influenced by various factors, including socialization, cultural norms, and individual experiences. Understanding and addressing gender roles in childhood is essential for promoting healthy identity development and fostering gender equity (Martin & Ruble, 2010).

=== Observations of gender identity formation ===
Educators have made abundant observations regarding children's expression of gender identity. From an earlier age, children absorb information about gender from various sources, including family, peers, media, and societal norms (Halim, Ruble, Tamis-LeMonda, & Shrout, 2010). These influences shape their perceptions and behaviors related to gender, leading them to either conform to or challenge gender stereotypes. An example could be when children may exhibit preferences for certain toys, activities, or clothing based on societal expectations associated with their perceived gender because that is what was handed to them or what was made okay from an authority figure, establishing a baseline.

=== Teacher research ===
Teacher research plays a crucial role in understanding gender roles in childhood development. Educators often are able to see similarities in children's behavior that reflect societal gender norms, such as boys moving towards rough play or girls engaging in nurturing activities (Solomon, 2016). These observations prompt more investigation into the factors contributing to these behaviors, including the classroom materials, teacher expectations, and social interactions by examining these factors, educators can gain insights into how gender stereotypes are perpetuated and explore strategies to promote gender equity in the classroom. Since teachers have the educational background of learning about and seeing these developments, it allows them to be great researchers in this subject category.

=== Influence of materials and teacher expectations ===
The materials provided in the classroom and the requirements established by teachers can influence children's behavior and interactions (Solomon, 2016). For instance, offering a diverse range of toys, books, and activities can help encourage these children to explore interests outside of traditional gender roles that are trying to be established by external sources (Martin & Ruble, 2013). Also, creating an environment where all children feel valued regardless of gender can help challenge stereotypes and promote ideal socialization experiences. By being aware of the materials and messages conveyed in the classroom, educators can create an environment that fosters gender diversity and empowers children to express themselves authentically (Solomon 2016).

=== Children's desire and search for power ===
Children actively seek/express power in interactions with others, often coming upon their understanding of gender idealistic. For example, they may use knowledge of gender norms to assert authority or control over others, such as excluding others from being able to participate in a game because of a gender stereotype like girls cannot play sports game or games that include rough play. These behaviors show children's attempts to sift through social hierarchies and establish identities within the context of expectations. By recognizing and addressing these dynamics, educators can promote more inclusive and equitable interactions among children.

=== Early acquisition of gender roles ===
Children begin to internalize gender roles from a young age, often as early as infancy. By preschool age, many children have developed some form of understanding on gender stereotypes and expectations (King, 2021). These stereotypes are established through various sources, including family, friends, media outlets, and cultural ideals, shaping children's understanding and behaviors related to gender. Education systems, parental influence, and media and store influence can contribute as many of these influences associated different colors with different genders, different influential figures, as well as different toys that are supposed to cater to a specific gender.

=== Expressions and behavior reflecting gender development ===
Children's expressions provide insights into their changing understanding of gender roles and relationships. However, it is necessary to be able to demonstrate processes of emotional regulation in situations where the individual needs an adjustment of the emotional response of larger intensity (Sanchis et al. 2020). Some children can develop stern understandings about gender stereotypes, showing a bias or discrimination towards those who do not conform to these norms. Educators play a role in counteracting these beliefs by providing opportunities for reflection and promoting empathy and respect for diverse gender identities (Martin & Ruble, 2010).

=== Educational strategies ===
In conclusion, promoting gender equity and challenging traditional gender roles in early childhood takes additional intentional educational strategies. This includes implementing multi-gendered activities, giving examples diverse role models, and offering open-ended materials for activity that encourage creativity (Martin & Ruble, 2010). By creating inclusive learning environments that affirm and celebrate gender diversity, researchers and individuals can support children in developing healthy and positive identities that transcend narrow stereotypes and promote social justice.

== Early approaches ==
=== Women in development (WID) ===
==== Theoretical approach ====
The term "women in development" was originally coined by a Washington-based network of female development professionals in the early 1970s who sought to question trickle down existing theories of development by contesting that economic development had identical impacts on men and women. The Women in Development movement (WID) gained momentum in the 1970s, driven by the resurgence of women's movements in developed countries, and particularly through liberal feminists striving for equal rights and labour opportunities in the United States. Liberal feminism, postulating that women's disadvantages in society may be eliminated by breaking down customary expectations of women by offering better education to women and introducing equal opportunity programmes, had a notable influence on the formulation of the WID approaches.

The focus of the 1970s feminist movements and their repeated calls for employment opportunities in the development agenda meant that particular attention was given to the productive labour of women, leaving aside reproductive concerns and social welfare. This approach was pushed forward by WID advocates, reacting to the general policy environment maintained by early colonial authorities and post-war development authorities, wherein inadequate reference to the work undertook by women as producers was made, as they were almost solely identified as their roles as wives and mothers. The WID's opposition to this "welfare approach" was in part motivated by the work of Danish economist Ester Boserup in the early 1970s, who challenged the assumptions of the said approach and highlighted the role women by women in the agricultural production and economy.

Reeves and Baden (2000) point out that the WID approach stresses the need for women to play a greater role in the development process. According to this perspective, women's active involvement in policymaking will lead to more successful policies overall. Thus, a dominant strand of thinking within WID sought to link women's issues with development, highlighting how such issues acted as impediments to economic growth; this "relevance" approach stemmed from the experience of WID advocates which illustrated that it was more effective if demands of equity and social justice for women were strategically linked to mainstream development concerns, in an attempt to have WID policy goals taken up by development agencies. The Women in Development approach was the first contemporary movement to specifically integrate women in the broader development agenda and acted as the precursor to later movements such as the Women and Development (WAD), and ultimately, the Gender and Development approach, departing from some of the criticized aspects imputed to the WID.

==== Criticism ====
The WID movement faced a number of criticisms; such an approach had in some cases the unwanted consequence of depicting women as a unit whose claims are conditional on its productive value, associating increased female status with the value of cash income in women's lives. The WID view and similar classifications based on Western feminism, applied a general definition to the status, experiences and contributions of women and the solutions for women in Third World countries. Furthermore, the WID, although it advocated for greater gender equality, did not tackle the unequal gender relations and roles at the basis of women's exclusion and gender subordination rather than addressing the stereotyped expectations entertained by men. Moreover, the underlying assumption behind the call for the integration of the Third World women with their national economy was that women were not already participating in development, thus downplaying women's roles in household production and informal economic and political activities. The WID was also criticized for its views on the fact that women's status will improve by moving into "productive employment", implying that the move to the "modern sector" need to be made from the "traditional" sector to achieve self-advancement, further implying that "traditional" work roles often occupied by women in the developing world were inhibiting to self-development.

=== Women and development (WAD) ===
Women and development (WAD) is a theoretical and practical approach to development. It was introduced into gender studies scholarship in the second half of the 1970s, following its origins, which can be traced to the First World Conference on Women in Mexico City in 1975, organized by the UN. It is a departure from the previously predominant theory, WID (Women in Development) and is often mistaken for WID, but has many distinct characteristics.

==== Theoretical approach ====
WAD arose out of a shift in thinking about women's role in development, and concerns about the explanatory limitations of modernization theory. While previous thinking held that development was a vehicle to advance women, new ideas suggested that development was only made possible by the involvement of women, and rather than being simply passive recipients of development aid, they should be actively involved in development projects. WAD took this thinking a step further and suggested that women have always been an integral part of development, and did not suddenly appear in the 1970s as a result of exogenous development efforts. The WAD approach suggests that there be women-only development projects that were theorized to remove women from the patriarchal hegemony that would exist if women participated in development alongside men in a patriarchal culture, though this concept has been heavily debated by theorists in the field. In this sense, WAD is differentiated from WID by way of the theoretical framework upon which it was built. Rather than focus specifically on women's relationship to development, WAD focuses on the relationship between patriarchy and capitalism. This theory seeks to understand women's issues from the perspectives of neo-Marxism and dependency theory, though much of the theorizing about WAD remains undocumented due to the persistent and pressing nature of development work in which many WAD theorists engage.

==== Practical approach ====
The WAD paradigm stresses the relationship between women, and the work that they perform in their societies as economic agents in both the public and domestic spheres. It also emphasizes the distinctive nature of the roles women play in the maintenance and development of their societies, with the understanding that purely the integration of women into development efforts would serve to reinforce the existing structures of inequality present in societies overrun by patriarchal interests. In general, WAD is thought to offer a more critical conceptualization of women's position compared to WID.

The WAD approach emphasizes the distinctive nature of women's knowledge, work, goals, and responsibilities, as well as advocating for the recognition of their distinctiveness. This fact, combined with a recognized tendency for development agencies to be dominated by patriarchal interests, is at the root of the women-only initiatives introduced by WAD subscribers.

==== Criticism ====
Some of the common critiques of the WAD approach include concerns that the women-only development projects would struggle, or ultimately fail, due to their scale, and the marginalized status of these women. Furthermore, the WAD perspective suffers from a tendency to view women as a class, and pay little attention to the differences among women (such as feminist concept of intersectionality), including race and ethnicity, and prescribe development endeavors that may only serve to address the needs of a particular group. While an improvement on WID, WAD fails to fully consider the relationships between patriarchy, modes of production, and the marginalization of women. It also presumes that the position of women around the world will improve when international conditions become more equitable. Additionally, WAD has been criticized for its singular preoccupation with the productive side of women's work, while it ignores the reproductive aspect of women's work and lives. Therefore, WID/WAD intervention strategies have tended to concentrate on the development of income-generating activities without taking into account the time burdens that such strategies place on women. Value is placed on income-generating activities, and none is ascribed to social and cultural reproduction.

=== Gender and development (GAD) ===
==== Theoretical approach ====
The Gender and Development (GAD) approach focuses on the socially constructed differences between men and women, the need to challenge existing gender roles and relations, and the creation and effects of class differences on development. This approach was majorly influenced by the writings of academic scholars such as Oakley (1972) and Rubin (1975), who argue the social relationship between men and women have systematically subordinated women, along with economist scholars Lourdes Benería and Amartya Sen (1981), who assess the impact of colonialism on development and gender inequality. They state that colonialism imposed more than a "value system" upon developing nations, it introduced a system of economics "designed to promote capital accumulation which caused class differentiation".

GAD departs from WID, which discussed women's subordination and lack of inclusion in discussions of international development without examining broader systems of gender relations. Influenced by this work, by the late 1970s, some practitioners working in the development field questioned focusing on women in isolation. GAD challenged the WID focus on women as an important "target group" and "untapped resources" for development. GAD marked a shift in thinking about the need to understand how women and men are socially constructed and how "those constructions are powerfully reinforced by the social activities that both define and are defined by them". GAD focuses primarily on the gendered division of labor and gender as a relation of power embedded in institutions. Consequently, two major frameworks, "gender roles" and "social relations analysis", are used in this approach. "Gender roles" focuses on the social construction of identities within the household; it also reveals the expectations from 'maleness and femaleness' in their relative access to resources. "Social relations analysis" exposes the social dimensions of hierarchical power relations embedded in social institutions, as well as its determining influence on "the relative position of men and women in society". This relative positioning tends to discriminate against women.

Unlike WID, the GAD approach is not concerned specifically with women, but with the way in which a society assigns roles, responsibilities and expectations to both women and men. GAD applies gender analysis to uncover the ways in which men and women work together, presenting results in neutral terms of economics and efficiency. In an attempt to create gender equality (denoting women having the same opportunities as men, including ability to participate in the public sphere), GAD policies aim to redefine traditional gender role expectations. Women are expected to fulfill household management tasks, home-based production as well as bearing and raising children and caring for family members. In terms of children, they develop social constructions through observations at a younger age than most people think. Children tend to learn about the differences between male and female actions and objects of use in a specific culture of their environment through observation (Chung & Huang 2021). Around three years old, children learn about stability of gender and demonstrate stereotyping similar to adults regarding toys, clothes, activities, games, colors, and even specific personality descriptions. (2021). By five years of age, they begin to develop identity and to possess stereotyping of personal–social attributes (2021). At that age of their life, children think that they are more similar to their same-gender peers and are likely to compare themselves with characteristics that fit the gender stereotype. After entering primary school, children's gender stereotyping extends to more dimensions, such as career choices, sports, motives to learn subjects which has an impact on the cognition of individuals (2021). The role of a wife is largely interpreted as 'the responsibilities of motherhood.' Men, however, are expected to be breadwinners, associated with paid work and market production. In the labor market, women tend to earn less than men. For instance, "a study by the Equality and Human Rights Commission found massive pay inequities in some United Kingdom's top finance companies, women received around 80 percent less performance-related pay than their male colleagues". In response to pervasive gender inequalities, Beijing Platform for Action established gender mainstreaming in 1995 as a strategy across all policy areas at all levels of governance for achieving gender equality.

GAD has been largely utilized in debates regarding development but this trend is not seen in the actual practice of developmental agencies and plans for development. Caroline Moser claims WID persists due to the challenging nature of GAD, but Shirin M. Rai counters this claim noting that the real issue lies in the tendency to overlap WID and GAD in policy. Therefore, it would only be possible if development agencies fully adopted GAD language exclusively. Caroline Moser developed the Moser Gender Planning Framework for GAD-oriented development planning in the 1980s while working at the Development Planning Unit of the University of London. Working with Caren Levy, she expanded it into a methodology for gender policy and planning. The Moser framework follows the Gender and Development approach in emphasizing the importance of gender relations. As with the WID-based Harvard Analytical Framework, it includes a collection of quantitative empirical facts. Going further, it investigates the reasons and processes that lead to conventions of access and control. The Moser Framework includes gender roles identification, gender needs assessment, disaggregating control of resources and decision making within the household, planning for balancing work and household responsibilities, distinguishing between different aims in interventions and involving women and gender-aware organizations in planning.

==== Criticism ====
GAD has been criticized for emphasizing the social differences between men and women while neglecting the bonds between them and also the potential for changes in roles. Another criticism is that GAD does not dig deeply enough into social relations and so may not explain how these relations can undermine programs directed at women. It also does not uncover the types of trade-offs that women are prepared to make for the sake of achieving their ideals of marriage or motherhood. Another criticism is that the GAD perspective is theoretically distinct from WID, but in practice, programs seem to have elements of both. Whilst many development agencies are now committed to a gender approach, in practice, the primary institutional perspective remain focused on a WID approach. Specifically, the language of GAD has been incorporated into WID programs. There is a slippage in reality where gender mainstreaming is often based in a single normative perspective as synonymous to women. Development agencies still advance gender transformation to mean economic betterment for women. Further criticisms of GAD is its insufficient attention to culture, with a new framework being offered instead: Women, Culture and Development (WCD). This framework, unlike GAD, wouldn't look at women as victims but would rather evaluate the Third World life of women through the context of the language and practice of gender, the Global South, and culture.

== Neoliberal approaches ==
=== Gender and neoliberal development institutions ===
Neoliberalism consists of policies that will privatize public industry, deregulate any laws or policies that interfere with the free flow of the market and cut back on all social services. These policies were often introduced to many low-income countries through structural adjustment programs (SAPs) by the World Bank and the International Monetary Fund (IMF). Neoliberalism was cemented as the dominant global policy framework in the 1980s and 1990s. Among development institutions, gender issues have increasingly become part of economic development agendas, as the examples of the World Bank shows. Awareness by international organizations of the need to address gender issues evolved over the past decades. The World Bank, and regional development banks, donor agencies, and government ministries have provided many examples of instrumental arguments for gender equality, for instance by emphasizing the importance of women's education as a way of increasing productivity in the household and the market. Their concerns have often focused on women's contributions to economic growth rather than the importance of women's education as a means for empowering women and enhancing their capabilities. The World Bank, for example, started focusing on gender in 1977 with the appointment of a first Women in Development Adviser. In 1984 the bank mandated that its programs consider women's issues. In 1994 the bank issued a policy paper on Gender and Development, reflecting current thinking on the subject. This policy aims to address policy and institutional constraints that maintain disparities between the genders and thus limit the effectiveness of development program. Thirty years after the appointment of a first Women in Development Adviser, a so-called Gender Action Plan was launched to underline the importance of the topic within development strategies and to introduce the new Smart Economics strategy.

Gender mainstreaming mandated by the 1995 Beijing Platform for action integrates gender in all aspects of individuals lives in regards to policy development on gender equality. The World Bank's Gender Action Plan of 2007–10 is built upon the Bank's gender mainstreaming strategy for gender equality. The Gender Action Plan's objective was advance women's economic empowerment through their participation in land, labor, financial and product markets. In 2012, the World Development Report was the first report of the series examining Gender Equality and Development. Florika Fink-Hooijer, head of the European Commission's Directorate-General for European Civil Protection and Humanitarian Aid Operations introduced cash-based aid as well as gender and age sensitive aid.

An argument made on the functions behind institutional financial institutions such as the International Monetary Fund (IMF) and the World Bank are that they support capitalist ideals through their means of economic growth of countries globally and their participation in the global economy and capitalist systems. The roles of banks as institutions and the creation of new workers' economy reflect neoliberal developing ideals is also present in the criticisms on neoliberal developing institutions. Another critique made on the market and institutions is that it contributes to the creation of policies and aid with gender-related outcomes. An argument made on the European Bank for Reconstruction and Development is that it creates a neoliberal dominance that continues the construction and reconstruction of gender norms by homogenously category women rather than the gender disparities within its policies.

=== Gender and outsourcing ===
One of the features of development encouraged in neoliberal approaches is outsourcing. Outsourcing is when companies from the western world moves some of their business to another country. The reasons these companies make the decision to move is often because of cheap labor costs. Although outsourcing is about businesses it is directly related to gender because it has greatly affected women. The reason it is related to gender is that women are mainly the people that are being hired for these cheap labor jobs and why they are being hired.

One example of a popular place for factories to relocate is to China. In China the main people who work in these factories are women, these women move from their home towns to cities far away for the factory jobs. The reasons these women move is to be able to make a wage to take care of not only themselves but their families as well. Oftentimes these women are expected to get these jobs.

Another example of a country the garment industry outsources work to is Bangladesh, which has one of the lowest costs of labor compared to other third world countries (see the ILO data provided in figure 1). With low labor costs, there is also poor compliance with labor standards in the factories. The factory workers in Bangladesh can experience several types of violations of their rights. These violations include: long working hours with no choice but to work overtime, deductions to wages, as well as dangerous and unsanitary working conditions.

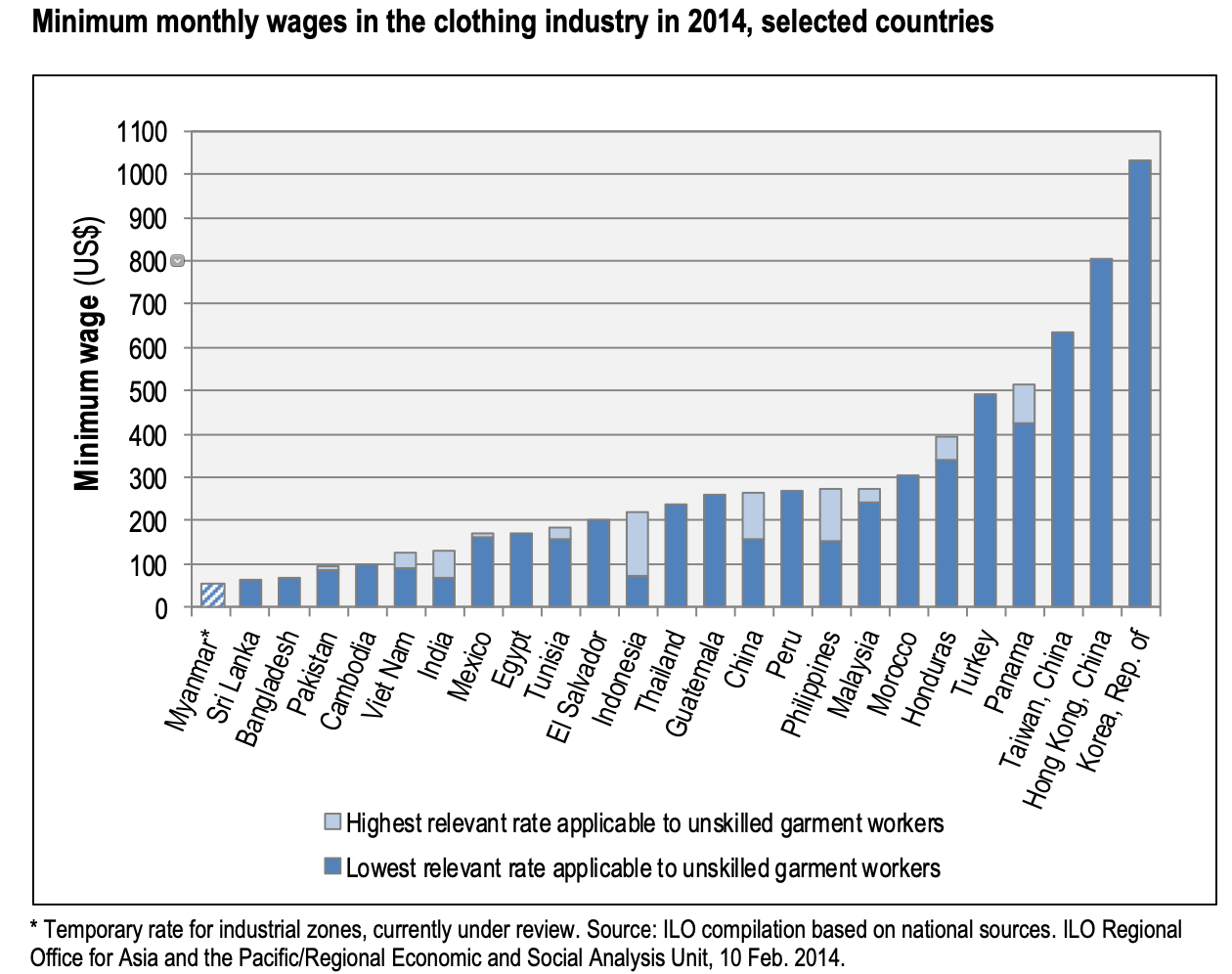
Figure 1

Although the discussions made around outsourcing do not often involve the effects on women, women daily endure constant results from it. Women in countries and areas that may not have been able to work and make their own income now have the opportunity to provide for themselves and their kids. Gender is brought to attention because unemployment is sometimes a threat to women. The reason for it being a threat is because without jobs and their own income women may fall victim to discrimination or abuse. It is very valuable to many women to be able to obtain their own source of income, outsourcing allows women in countries that may not easily obtain a job the opportunity to obtain jobs. Many times factory owners discuss how many women want the jobs they have to offer.

With the availability of jobs and the seeming benefits comes a concern for the work conditions in these outsourced jobs. Although some women have acquired a job the work conditions may not be safe or ideal. As mentioned above the jobs are in extreme demand because of how limited opportunities for employment is in certain regions. This leads to the idea of women being disposable at the workplace. As a result of this the workers in these factories do not have room to complain. They also are not able to expect safe working conditions in their work environments. Women have to move far from their hometowns and families to work at these factory jobs. The hours are long and because they are not home they typically also move into dormitories and live at their jobs.

=== Gender and microfinance ===
Women have been identified by some development institutions as a key to successful development, for example through financial inclusion. Microcredit is giving small loans to people in poverty without collateral. This was first started by Muhammad Yunus, who formed the Grameen Bank in Bangladesh. Studies have shown that women are more likely to repay their debt than men, and the Grameen Bank focuses on aiding women. This financial opportunity allows women to start their own businesses for a steady income. Women have been the focus of microcredit for their subsequent increased status as well as the overall well-being of the home being improved when given to women rather than men.

There were numerous case studies done in Tanzania about the correlation of the role of SACCoS (savings and credit cooperative organization) and the economic development of the country. The research showed that the microfinance policies were not being carried out in the most efficient ways due to exploitation. One case study went a step further to claim that this financial service could provide a more equal society for women in Tanzania.

While there are such cases in which women were able to lift themselves out of poverty, there are also cases in which women fell into a poverty trap as they were unable to repay their loans. It is even said that microcredit is actually an "anti-developmental" approach. There is little evidence of significant development for these women within the 30 years that the microfinance has been around. In South Africa, unemployment is high due to the introduction of microfinance, more so than it was under apartheid. Microcredit intensified poverty in Johannesburg, South Africa as poor communities, mostly women, who needed to repay debt were forced to work in the informal sector.

Some arguments that microcredit is not effective insist that the structure of the economy, with large informal and agriculture sectors, do not provide a system in which borrowers can be successful. In Nigeria, where the informal economy is approximately 45–60% of economy, women working within it could not attain access to microcredit because of the high demand for loans triggered by high unemployment rates in the formal sector. This study found Nigerian woman are forced into "the hustle" and enhanced risk of the informal economy, which is unpredictable and contributes to women's inability to repay the loans. Another example from a study conducted in Arampur, Bangladesh, found that microcredit programs within the agrarian community do not effectively help the borrower pay their loan because the terms of the loan are not compatible with farm work. If was found that MFIs force borrowers to repay before the harvesting season starts and in some cases endure the struggles of sharecropping work that is funded by the loan.

Although there is debate on how effective microcredit is in alleviating poverty in general, there is an argument that microcredit enables women to participate and fulfill their capabilities in society. For example, a study conducted in Malayasia showed that their version of microcredit, AIM, had a positive effect on Muslim women's empowerment in terms of allowing them to have more control over family planning and over decisions that were made in the home.

In contrast, out of a study conducted on 205 different MFIs, they concluded that there is still gender discrimination within microfinance institutions themselves and microcredit which impact the existing discrimination within communities as well. In Bangladesh, another outcome seen for some of the Grameen recipients was that they faced domestic abuse as a result of their husbands feeling threatened about women bringing in more income. A study in Uganda also noted that men felt threatened through increased female financial dominance, increasing women's vulnerability at home.

Through the "constructivist feminist standpoint", women can understand that the limitations they face are not inherent and in fact, are "constructed" by traditional gender roles, which they have the ability to challenge through owning their own small business. Through this focus, a study focused on the Foundation for International Community Assistance's (FINCA) involvement and impact in Peru, where women are made aware of the "machismo" patriarchal culture in which they live through their experiences with building small enterprises. In Rajasthan, India, another study found mixed results for women participating in a microlending program. Though many women were not able to pay back their loans, many were still eager to take on debt because their microfinance participation created a platform to address other inequities within the community.

Another example is the Women's Development Business (WDB) in South Africa, a Grameen Bank microfinance replicator. According to WDB, the goal is to ensure "that rural women are given the tools to free themselves from the chains of poverty" through allocation of financial resources directly to women including enterprise development programs. The idea is to use microfinance as a market-oriented tool to ensure access to financial services for disadvantaged and low-income people and therefore fostering economic development through financial inclusion.

Diving into another example regarding Microfinance and women from Women Entrepreneurship Promotion in Developing Countries: What explains the gender gap in entrepreneurship and how to close it? is Vossenberg (2013) describes how although there has been an increase in entrepreneurship for women, the gender gap still persists. The author states "The gender gap is commonly defined as the difference between men and women in terms of numbers engaged in entrepreneurial activity, motives to start or run a business, industry choice and business performance and growth" (Vossenberg, 2). The article dives into how in Eastern Europe there is a low rate of women entrepreneurs. Although the author discusses how in Africa nearly fifty percent of women make up entrepreneurs.

As a reaction, a current topic in the feminist literature on economic development is the "gendering" of microfinance, as women have increasingly become the target borrowers for rural microcredit lending. This, in turn, creates the assumption of a "rational economic woman" which can exacerbate existing social hierarchies). Therefore, the critique is that the assumption of economic development through microfinance does not take into account all possible outcomes, especially the ones affecting women.

The impact of programs of the Bretton Woods Institutions and other similar organizations on gender are being monitored by Gender Action, a watchdog group founded in 2002 by Elaine Zuckerman who is a former World Bank economist.

=== Gender, financial crises, and neoliberal economic policy ===
The Great Recession and the following politics of austerity have opened up a wide range of gender and feminist debates on neoliberalism and the impact of the crisis on women. One view is that the crisis has affected women disproportionately and that there is a need for alternative economic structures in which investment in social reproduction needs to be given more weight. The International Labour Organization (ILO) assessed the impact of the Great Recession on workers and concluded that while the crisis initially affected industries that were dominated by male workers (such as finance, construction and manufacturing) it then spread over to sectors in which female workers are predominantly active. Examples for these sectors are the service sector or wholesale-retail trade.

There are different views among feminists on whether neoliberal economic policies have more positive or negative impacts on women. In the post-war era, feminist scholars such as Elizabeth Wilson criticized state capitalism and the welfare state as a tool to oppress women. Therefore, neoliberal economic policies featuring privatization and deregulation, hence a reduction of the influence of the state and more individual freedom was argued to improve conditions for women. This anti-welfare state thinking arguably led to feminist support for neoliberal ideas embarking on a macroeconomic policy level deregulation and a reduced role of the state.

Therefore, some scholars in the field argue that feminism, especially during its second wave, has contributed key ideas to Neoliberalism that, according to these authors, creates new forms of inequality and exploitation.

As a reaction to the phenomenon that some forms of feminism are increasingly interwoven with capitalism, many suggestions on how to name these movements have emerged in the feminist literature. Examples are "free market feminism" or even "faux-feminism".

=== Smart economics ===
==== Theoretical approaches ====
Advocated chiefly by the World Bank, smart economics is an approach to define gender equality as an integral part of economic development and it aims to spur development through investing more efficiently in women and girls. It stresses that the gap between men and women in human capital, economic opportunities, and voice/agency is a chief obstacle in achieving more efficient development. As an approach, it is a direct descendant of the efficiency approach taken by WID which "rationalizes 'investing' in women and girls for more effective development outcomes". As articulated in the section of WID, the efficiency approach to women in development was chiefly articulated by Caroline Moser in the late 1980s. Continuing the stream of WID, smart economics' key unit of analysis is women as individual and it particularly focuses on measures that promote to narrow down the gender gap. Its approach identifies women are relatively underinvested source of development and it defines gender equality an opportunity of higher return investment. "Gender equality itself is here depicted as smart economics, in that it enables women to contribute their utmost skills and energies to the project of world economic development." In this term, smart economics champions neoliberal perspective in seeing business as a vital vehicle for change and it takes a stance of liberal feminism.

The thinking behind smart economics dates back, at least, to the lost decade of the Structural Adjustment Policies (SAPs) in the 1980s. In 1995, World Bank issued its flagship publication on gender matters of the year Enhancing Women's Participation in Economic Development (World Bank 1995). This report marked a critical foundation to the naissance of Smart Economics; in a chapter entitled "The Pay-offs to Investing in Women", the Bank proclaimed that investing in women "speeds economic development by raising productivity and promoting the more efficient use of resources; it produces significant social returns, improving child survival and reducing fertility, and it has considerable intergenerational pay-offs". The Bank also emphasized its associated social benefits generated by investing in women. For example, the Bank turned to researches of Whitehead that evidenced a greater female-control of household income is associated with better outcomes for children's welfare and Jeffery and Jeffery who analyzed the positive correlation between female education and lower fertility rates. In the 2000s, the approach of smart economics came to be further crystallized through various frameworks and initiatives. A first step was World Bank's Gender Action Plan (GAP) 2007–/2010, followed by the "Three Year Road Map for Gender Mainstreaming 2010–13". The 2010–13 framework responded to criticisms for its precursor and incorporated some shifts in thematic priorities. Lastly but not least, the decisive turning point was 2012 marked by its publication of "World Development Report 2012: Gender Equality and Development". This Bank's first comprehensive focus on the gender issues was welcomed by various scholars and practitioners, as an indicator of its seriousness. For example, Shahra Razavi appraised the report as "a welcome opportunity for widening the intellectual space".

Other international organizations, particular UN families, have so far endorsed the approach of smart economics. Examining the relationship between child well-being and gender equality, for example, UNICEF also referred to the "Double Dividend of Gender Equality". Its explicit link to a wider framework of the Millennium Development Goals (where the Goal 3 is Promoting Gender Equality and Women's Empowerment) claimed a wider legitimacy beyond economic efficiency. In 2007, the Bank proclaimed that "The business case for investing in MDG 3 is strong; it is nothing more than smart economics." In addition, "Development organisations and governments have been joined in this focus on the 'business case' for gender equality and the empowerment of women, by businesses and enterprises which are interested in contributing to social good." A good example is "Girl Effect initiative" taken by Nike Foundation. Its claim for economic imperative and a broader socio-economic impact also met a strategic need of NGOs and community organizations that seeks justification for their program funding. Thus, some NGOs, for example Plan International, captured this trend to further their program. The then-president of the World Bank Robert B. Zoellick was quoted by Plan International in stating: "Investing in adolescent girls is precisely the catalyst poor countries need to break intergenerational poverty and to create a better distribution of income. Investing in them is not only fair, it is a smart economic move." The Great Recession and austerity measures taken by major donor counties further supported this approach, since international financial institutions and international NGOs received a greater pressure from donors and from global public to design and implement maximally cost-effective programs.

=== = Criticisms ===
From the mid-2000s, the approach of smart economics and its chief proponent – World Bank – met a wide range of criticisms and denouncements. These discontents can be broadly categorized into three major claims; Subordination of Intrinsic Value; Ignorance for the need of systemic transformation; Feminisation of responsibility; Overemphasized efficiency; and Opportunistic pragmatism. This is not exhaustive list of criticisms, but the list aims to highlight different emphasis among existing criticisms.

The World Bank's gender policy aims to eliminate poverty and enhance economic growth by addressing gender disparities and inequalities that hinders development. A critique on the World Bank's gender policy is it being "gender-blind" and not properly addressing gender inequity. Rather a critique made is that the World Bank's gender policy utilizes gender equality as an ends means rather than analyzing root causes for economic disparities and gender equity.

Smart economics' subordination of women under the justification of development invited fierce criticisms. Chant expresses her grave concern that "Smart economics is concerned with building women's capacities in the interests of development rather than promoting women's rights for their own sake." She disagrees that investment in women should be promoted by its instrumental utility: "it is imperative to ask whether the goal of female investment is primarily to promote gender equality and women's 'empowerment', or to facilitate development 'on the cheap', and/or to promote further economic liberalization". Although smart economics outlines that gender equality has intrinsic value (realizing gender equality is an end itself) and instrumental value (realizing gender equality is a means to a more efficient development), many points out that the Bank pays almost exclusive attentions to the latter in defining its framework and strategy. Zuckerman also echoed this point by stating "business case [which] ignores the moral imperative of empowering women to achieve women's human rights and full equal rights with men". In short, Chant casts a doubt that if it is not "possible to promote rights through utilitarianism".

A wide range of scholars and practitioners has criticized that smart economics rather endorse the current status-quo of gender inequality and keep silence for the demand of institutional reform. Its approach "[d]oes not involves public action to transform the laws, policies, and practices which constrain personal and group agency". Naila Kabeer also posits that "attention to collective action to enable women to challenge structural discrimination has been downplayed". Simply, smart economics assumes that women are entirely capable of increasingly contributing for economic growth amid the ongoing structural barriers to realize their capabilities.

Sylvia Chant (2008) discredited its approach as "feminisation of responsibility and/or obligation" where the smart economics intends to spur growth simply by demanding more from women in terms of time, labour, energy, and other resources. She also agrees that "Smart economics seeks to use women and girls to fix the world". She further goes by clarifying that "It is less welcome to women who are already contributing vast amounts to both production and unpaid reproduction to be romanticised and depicted as the salvation of the world."

Chant is concerned that "An efficiency-driven focus on young women and girls as smart economics leaves this critical part of the global population out." Smart economics assumes that all women are at their productive stage and fallaciously neglects lives of the elderly women, or women with handicaps. Thus she calls for recognition of "equal rights of all women and girls –regardless of age, or the extent of nature of their economic contribution". Also, its approach does not talk about cooperation and collaboration between males and females thus leaving men and boys completely out of picture.

Chant emphasize that "The smart economics approach represents, at best, pragmatism in a time of economic restructuring and austerity." Smart economics can have a wider acceptance and legitimacy because now is the time when efficiency is most demanded, not because its utilitarianism has universal appeal. She further warns that feminists should be very cautious about "supporting, and working in coalition with, individuals and institutions who approach gender equality through the lens of smart economics. This may have attractions in strategic terms, enabling us to access resources for work focusing on supporting the individual agency of women and girls, but risks aggravating many of the complex problems that gender and development seeks to transform."

== Alternative approaches ==
Other approaches with different paradigms have also played a historically important role in advancing theories and practices in gender and development.

=== Marxism and Neo-Marxism ===
The structuralist debate was first triggered by Marxist and socialist feminists. Marxism, particularly through alternative models of state socialist development practiced in China and Cuba, challenged the dominant liberal approach over time. Neo-Marxist proponents focused on the role of the post-colonial state in development in general and also on localized class struggles. Marxist feminists advanced these criticisms towards liberal approaches and made significant contribution to the contemporary debate.

=== Dependency theory ===
Dependency theorists opposed that liberal development models, including the attempt to incorporate women into the existing global capitalism, was, in fact, nothing more than the "development of underdevelopment". This view led them to propose that delinking from the structural oppression of global capitalism is the only way to achieve balanced human development. In the 1980s, there also emerged "a sustained questioning by post-structuralist critics of the development paradigm as a narrative of progress and as an achievable enterprise".

=== Basic needs approach, capability approach, and ecofeminism ===
Within the liberal paradigm of women and development, various criticism have emerged. The Basic Needs (BN) approach began to pose questions to the focus on growth and income as indicators of development. It was heavily influenced by Sen and Nussbaum's capability approach, which was more gender sensitive than BN and focused on expanding human freedom. The BN particularly proposed a participatory approach to development and challenged the dominant discourse of trickle down effects. These approaches focused on the human freedom led to development of other important concepts such as human development and human security. From a perspective of sustainable development, ecofeminists articulated the direct link between colonialism and environmental degradation, which resulted in degradation of women's lives themselves.

== Sources ==
- Bertrand, Tietcheu (2006). Being Women and Men in Africa Today: Approaching Gender Roles in Changing African Societies.
- Bradshaw, Sarah (May 2013). "Women's role in economic development: Overcoming the constraints". UNSDSN. UNSDSN. Retrieved 22 November 2013.
- Chant, Sylvia (August 2012). "The disappearing of 'smart economics'? The World Development Report 2012 on Gender Equality: Some concerns about the preparatory process and the prospects for paradigm change". Global Social Policy. 12 (2): 198–218. doi:10.1177/1468018112443674. S2CID 145291907.
- Chant, Sylvia; Sweetman, Caroline (November 2012). "Fixing women or fixing the world? 'Smart economics', efficiency approaches, and gender equality in development". Gender & Development. 20 (3): 517–529. doi:10.1080/13552074.2012.731812. S2CID 154921144.
- Development Assistance Committee (DAC), 1998, p. 7
- Eisenstein, Hester (2009). Feminism Seduced: How Global Elites Use Women's Labor and Ideas to Exploit the World. Boulder: Paradigm Publishers. ISBN 1594516596. Retrieved 25 November 2013.
- Elizabeth Wilson. Women and the Welfare State. Routledge.
- Elson, Diane; Pearson, Ruth (27 September 2013). "Keynote of Diane Elson and Ruth Pearson at the Gender, Neoliberalism and Financial Crisis Conference at the University of York".SoundCloud. Retrieved 27 November 2013.
- Frank, Andre Gunder (1969). Capitalism and underdevelopment in Latin America: historical studies of Chile and Brazil (Rev. and enl. ed. ed.). New York: Monthly Review P. ISBN 0853450935.
- Fraser, Nancy (2012). "Feminism, Capitalism, and the Cunning of History". Working paper. Fondation Maison des sciences de l'homme. p. 14. Retrieved 2 November 2013.
- Harcourt, W. (2016). The Palgrave handbook of gender and development: critical engagements in feminist theory and practice. ISBN 978-1-137-38273-3.
- ILO. Employment, growth, and basic needs: a one-world problem: report of the Director-General of the International Labour Office. Geneva: International Labour Office. 1976.ISBN 9789221015109.
- Irene Tinker (1990). Persistent Inequalities: Women and World Development. Oxford University Press. p. 30. ISBN 978-0-19-506158-1.
- Jackson, edited by Cecile; Pearson, Ruth (2002). Feminist visions of development: gender analysis and policy (1. publ. ed.). London: Routledge. p. Jeffrey, P., & Jeffrey, R. (1998). Silver Bullet or Passing Fancy? Girl's Schooling and Population Policy. ISBN 0415157900.
- Kabeer, Naila (2003). Gender mainstreaming in poverty eradication and the Millennium development goals a handbook for policy-makers and other stakeholders. London: Commonwealth secretariat. ISBN 0-85092-752-8.
- Koczberski, Gina (1 September 1998). "Women in development: A critical analysis". Third World Quarterly. 19 (3): 395–410. doi:10.1080/01436599814316. hdl:20.500.11937/14444.
- March, Candida; Smyth, Inés A.; Mukhopadhyay, Maitrayee (1999). A guide to gender-analysis frameworks. Oxfam. ISBN 0-85598-403-1.
- McRobbie, Angela (2009). The Aftermath of Feminism: Gender, Culture and Social Change. London: Sage. ISBN 0761970622. Retrieved 25 November 2013.
- Merchant, Carolyn (1980). The death of nature: women, ecology, and the scientific revolution: a feminist reappraisal of the scientific revolution(First edition. ed.). San Francisco: Harper & Row.ISBN 0062505718.
- Mies, Maria; Bennholdt-Thomsen, Veronika; Werlhof, Claudia von (1988). Women: the last colony (1. publ. ed.). London: Zed Books.ISBN 0862324556.
- Moser, Caroline O.N. (November 1989). "Gender planning in the third world: Meeting practical and strategic gender needs". World Development. 17 (11): 1799–1825. doi:10.1016/0305-750X(89)90201-5.
- Moser, Caroline (1993). Gender Planning and Development. Theory, Practice and Training. New York: Routledge. p. 3.
- Moser, Caroline O.N. (1995). Gender planning and development: theory, practice and training(Reprint. ed.). London [u.a.]: Routledge.ISBN 0415056209.
- Nalini Visvanathan ... [et.al] The women, gender and development reader (2nd ed. ed.). London: Zed Books. p. 29.ISBN 9781848135871.
- New York Times. "Nike Harnesses 'Girl Effect' Again". New York Times, November 10, 2010. Retrieved 1 December 2013.
- Barriteau, Eudine; Connelly, Patricia; Parpart, Jane L (2000). Theoretical perspectives on gender and development. Ottawa: International Development Research Centre (IDRC). ISBN 978-0-88936-910-8.
- Pearce, Samir Amin. Transl. by Brian (1976).Unequal development: an essay on the social formations of peripheral capitalism (al-Ṭabʻah 4. ed.). Hassocks: Harvester Pr. ISBN 0901759465.
- Plan International.Summary_ENGLISH_lo_resolution.pdf 'Because I Am a Girl: The State of the World's Girls 2009. Girls in the Global Economy. Adding it All Up.'. Plan International. p. 11 and 28.
- Prügl, Elisabeth (March 2012). "'If Lehman Brothers Had Been Lehman Sisters...': Gender and Myth in the Aftermath of the Financial Crisis: Gender and Myth in the Aftermath of the Financial Crisis". International Political Sociology. 6 (1): 21–35. doi:10.1111/j.1749-5687.2011.00149.x.
- Rankin, Katharine N. (2001). "Governing Development: Neoliberalism, Microcredit, and Rational Economic Woman". Economy and Society (Fondation Maison des sciences de l'homme) 30: 20. Retrieved 2 November 2013.
- Rathgeber, Eva M. 1990. "WID, WAD, GAD: Trends in Research and Practice". The Journal of Developing Areas. 24(4) 289–502
- Razavi, S. 'World Development Report 2012: Gender Equality and Development: An Opportunity Both Welcome and Missed (An Extended Commentary)'. Archived 2014-05-14 at the Wayback Machine p. 2.
- Razavi, Shahrashoub; Miller, Carol (1995). "From WID to GAD: Conceptual shifts in the Women and Development discourse". United Nations Research Institute Occasional Paper series (United Nations Research Institute for Social Development) 1: 2. Retrieved 22 November 2013.
- Reeves, Hazel (2000). Gender and Development: Concepts and Definitions. Brighton. p. 8. ISBN 1858643813.
- Robert Connell (1987). Gender and power: society, the person, and sexual politics. Stanford University Press. ISBN 978-0-8047-1430-3.
- Roberts, Adrienne; Soederberg, Susanne (June 2012). "Gender Equality as Smart Economics ? A critique of the 2012 World Development Report". Third World Quarterly. 33 (5): 949–968. doi:10.1080/01436597.2012.677310. S2CID 153821844.
- Schech, S.; Mustafa, M. (1 March 2010). "The Politics of Gender Mainstreaming Poverty Reduction: An Indonesian Case Study". Social Politics: International Studies in Gender, State & Society. 17 (1): 111–135. doi:10.1093/sp/jxp025.
- Sen, Amartya (2001). Development as freedom(1. publ. as an Oxford Univ. Press paperback ed.). Oxford [u.a.]: Oxford Univ. Press.ISBN 0192893300.
- "Shifting views of women and development". Africa Recovery. 11. United Nations. April 1998.
- Singh, Shweta. (2007). Deconstructing Gender and development for Identities of Women, International Journal of Social Welfare, Issue 16, pp. 100–109.
- True, J (2012). Feminist Strategies in Global Governance: Gender Mainstreaming. New York: Routledge. p. 37.
- UNICEF (2006). The state of the world's children 2007: women and children: the double dividend of gender equality. United Nations Children's Fund.
- UNU. The quality of life a study prepared for the World Institute for Development Economics Research (WIDER) of the United Nations University (Repr. ed.). Oxford: Clarendon Press. 1995. ISBN 9780198287971.
- Van Marle, Karin (2006). Sex, gender, becoming: post-apartheid reflections. PULP. ISBN 0-9585097-5-1.
- "World Bank Gender Overview". World Bank. World Bank. 3 May 2013. Retrieved 5 November 2013.
- WDB about page". Women's Development Business. WDB. 2013. Retrieved 28 November 2013.
- World Bank (1995). Enhancing Women's Participation in Economic Development(Washington, DC: World Bank). p. 22.
- World Bank. "Applying Gender Action Plan Lessons: A Three-Year Road Map for Gender Mainstreaming (2011–2013)". World Bank Report. World Bank. Retrieved 1 December 2013.
- World Bank. "World Development Report 2012: Gender Equality and Development". World Development Report. World Bank. Retrieved 1 December 2013.
- World Bank. Global Monitoring Report 2007: Millennium Development Goals: Confronting the Challenges of Gender Equality and Fragile States (Vol. 4). World Bank – free PDF. p. 145.
- Young, edited by Kate; Wolkowitz, Carol; McCullagh, Roslyn (1984). Of marriage and the market: women's subordination internationally and its lessons (2nd ed.). London: Routledge & Kegan Paul. p. Whitehead, A. (1984) 'I'm hungry, mum: the politics of domestic budgeting.' ISBN 9780710202932.
