= Muse (disambiguation) =

The Muses are the nine inspirational goddesses of literature, science, and the arts in Greek and Roman mythology.

Muse or muses may also refer to:

== Arts, entertainment and media ==
=== In general ===
- Muse (person), a human inspiration for or influence on the works of a creative artist

=== Music ===
- Muse (band), an English rock band
- Muse Records, an American jazz record label
- Muse (Grace Jones album) (1979)
- Muse (Candy Lo album) (2000)
- Muse (Jimin album) (2024)
- Muse (EP), an EP by Muse
- Muse (Jolin Tsai album) (2012)
- Muse Group, a music software and education company

=== Film ===
- Luster (film) or Muse, a 2002 film by Everett Lewis
- Muse (2017 film), an English-language Spanish supernatural thriller film
- Muse (2019 film), a British psychological horror film

=== Magazines ===
- Muse (children's magazine)
- Muse (Hong Kong magazine)

=== Other uses in arts, entertainment and media ===
- Muse (novel), a 2013 novel by Mary Novik
- "Muse" (Star Trek: Voyager), a 2000 TV episode
- Muse Entertainment, Canadian independent film and television producer and service provider
- Muse (character), a character from Marvel Comics and enemy of Daredevil
- Muse, a character from DC Comics and enemy of Blue Beetle
- Muse Communication, also known as simply Muse, a Taiwanese distributor and licensor
- Muse (web series), a pornographic drama series
- "Muse" (Endeavour), a 2018 TV episode
- The Muses (painting), a 1578 painting by Tintoretto

== Education ==
- Mercer University School of Engineering, in Georgia, US
- Multicultural Urban Secondary English, a program at University of California, Berkeley, US

== People ==
- Muse (surname)
- Muse Bihi Abdi (born 1948), president of Somaliland from 2017 to 2024
- Muse Watson (born 1948), American actor
- Muse, the United States Secret Service code name for Melania Trump

== Places ==
- Muse, Myanmar, a town on Shweli River in Shan State, Myanmar
- Muse, Florida
- Muse, Oklahoma

== Science and technology ==
=== Computing ===
- MusE, an open-source MIDI/audio sequencer for Linux
- MuseScore, a music notation software
- Adobe Muse, Adobe software to write HTML code
- Muse Software, a software and computer game publisher and developer
- Muse Group, a music software developer
- Muse (AI agent), a personal AI agent developed by Meta Platforms
- Muse Spark, a large language model developed by Meta Superintelligence Labs
- Muse Code, a terminal-based coding agent developed by Meta Superintelligence Labs
- Muse Glimmer, an open-weight multimodal large language model developed by Meta Superintelligence Labs
- Project MUSE, a digital archive

=== Spacecraft ===
- MUSE (spacecraft), a 2026 proposed orbiter mission to the planet Uranus
- Multi-slit Solar Explorer (MUSE), planned NASA heliophysics mission
- MUSES Program, Mu Space Engineering Spacecraft

=== Other uses in science and technology ===
- Muse, a Chinese brand of home appliance and audio and video products owned by SpacemiT
- Mac Muse, a Czech paraglider design
- Muse cell, a stem cell
- Multiple sub-Nyquist sampling encoding, a Japanese analog HDTV television standard
  - MUSE LaserDisc (Hi-Vision LD), a short-lived high-definition version of LaserDisc based on the above
- Multi-Unit Spectroscopic Explorer, an instrument at the Very Large Telescope
- MUSE, a brand name for Prostaglandin E1, an erectile dysfunction treatment

== Other uses ==
- Muse (building), a condo development in Sunny Isles, Florida
- Muse (clan), a Somali clan
- Muse (headband), a brand of brain activity sensing headband
- MUSE - Museo delle Scienze, a science museum in Trento, Italy
- Muse Air, American airline (1980–1987)
- Tokorozawa Civic Cultural Centre Muse, a concert hall complex in Tokorozawa, Japan
- Triadex Muse, an electronic digital musical instrument
- Musicians United for Safe Energy, an anti-nuclear activist group founded in 1979

== See also ==
- The Muse (disambiguation)
- Muze
- Mews
