= Hal Leonard =

American publishing and distribution company

- Parent company: Muse Group
- Status: Active
- Founded: 1947; 79 years ago Winona, Minnesota
- Founder: Harold "Hal" Edstrom; Everett "Leonard" Edstrom; Roger Busdicker
- Country of origin: United States
- Headquarters location: Milwaukee, Wisconsin, U.S.
- Key people: Larry Morton, CEO
- Publication types: Sheet music, Books, DVDs, software
- Official website: halleonard.com

Hal Leonard LLC (formerly Hal Leonard Corporation) is an American music publishing and distribution company headquartered in Milwaukee, Wisconsin. It was founded in 1947 by Harold "Hal" Edstrom, his brother, Everett "Leonard" Edstrom, and musician Roger Busdicker in Winona, Minnesota. Hal Leonard is the largest sheet music publisher in the world. It has been a subsidiary of Cypriot music company Muse Group since 2023.

== History ==
=== 1947 to 2016 ===
The company produces sheet music, songbooks, and method book (with audio) packs, and band, orchestra, and choral arrangements, reference books, instructional videos, and instrumental accompaniments. In addition, they distribute other brands, such as Gibraltar, Gretsch Drums, Avid, Blue Microphones, and many more. In 1989, Hal Leonard acquired Jenson Publications and its catalog of band, orchestra, and choral titles. In 1995, Hal Leonard began distributing Homespun Music Instruction instructional video and audio materials.

In 1997, Hal Leonard and Music Sales Group founded SheetMusicDirect.com, the world's first website for digital sheet music and guitar tablature. In 2004, Hal Leonard acquired Applause Theatre and Cinema Books. In 2006, Hal Leonard acquired Amadeus Press and Limelight Editions. Also in 2006, Hal Leonard acquired Backbeat Books, which publishes the AllMusic reference guide and other music-related publications, from CMP.

In 2009, Hal Leonard acquired Shawnee Press from Music Sales Group. In 2014, Hal Leonard acquired Noteflight, an online music notation service and a community for sharing scores. Private equity firm Seidler Equity Partners acquired majority ownership of the company in June 2016. Following the change in ownership, Hal Leonard was reorganized from a corporation to a limited liability company.

=== 2017 to present ===
In 2017, Hal Leonard acquired the online music retailer Sheet Music Plus. In 2018, Hal Leonard purchased the physical and online printed music businesses of global independent music publisher The Music Sales Group. They also acquired Groove3, a leading website specializing in music technology tutorial videos. In December 2018, Hal Leonard announced it had sold five of its trade imprints—Hal Leonard Books, Applause Theatre & Cinema Books, Amadeus Press, Backbeat Books, and Limelight Editions—to Rowman & Littlefield.

As of 2020, Hal Leonard publishes, distributes, and represents the print music interests for a myriad of publishing companies, both classical and popular. In North America, Hal Leonard is the exclusive licensee of the print rights for Disney Music Group and Universal Music Publishing Group. Hal Leonard is also the North American distributor of numerous American and European classical publishers, including G. Schirmer, Inc., Boosey & Hawkes, Éditions Durand, and Faber Piano Adventures. Through its acquisition of numerous school music publishing companies over the past 40 years, Hal Leonard is currently one of the largest music publishers in the field of music education; its primary competitor in the educational market is Alfred Music.

The Hal Leonard corporate headquarters is in Milwaukee, Wisconsin. Their distribution, production and warehousing facilities are in Winona, Minnesota. It also has offices abroad in Australia, Belgium, China, Germany, the Netherlands, India, Italy, Switzerland, as well as in London and Bury St. Edmunds in England.

Hal Leonard has sponsored many awards to young musicians and educators. Hal Leonard has partnered with the Jazz Education Network to offer the Hal Leonard Collegiate Scholarship, which was awarded to Tanner Guss in 2017.

In 2023, Hal Leonard was acquired by Muse Group, owners of other sheet music-related products such as MuseScore, Ultimate Guitar, and StaffPad.
