= Collective for Research and Training on Development-Action =

Lebanon-based non-governmental organization

Coordinates: 33°52′42″N 35°30′58″E

Collective for Research and Training on Development-Action (CRTD.A) مجموعة الأبحاث والتدريب للعمل التنموي
- Founded: 1999
- Type: NGO
- Location: Beirut (Lebanon)
- Website: Official website

The Collective for Research and Training on Development-Action (CRTD.A) is a Lebanon-based non-governmental organization started in July 1999. CRTDA works with partner civil society organizations in Lebanon and across the Arab World primarily in Yemen, Egypt, Syria, Morocco, Tunisia, and Algeria. CRTD.A seeks to contribute to the social development of local communities and organizations through enhancing capacities particularly in gender analysis, gender and development, poverty and exclusion, for the purpose of contributing to creating a more just and equitable environment.

== Projects ==
- The Machreq/Maghreb Gender Linking and Information Project (MACMAG GLIP)
- Independent Resources and Information Services (IRIS)
- Sustainable Economic Opportunities for Women (SEOW)
- Women Economic Empowerment Project (WEEP)
- Active Citizenship and Gendered Social Entitlements (ACGEN)
- The Arab Women's Right to Nationality Campaign (WRN)
- Faith Based Organizations (FBO) Research Project
- The Lebanon Development Gateway (LDG)

== See also ==
- OXFAM
- International Development Research Centre
