= Moser =

Moser may refer to:

- Moser (surname)
- An individual who commits the act of Mesirah in Judaism

== Places ==
- Moser Glacier, a glacier on the west coast of Graham Land, Antarctica
- Moser River, Nova Scotia, Canada
- Moser Bay Seaplane Base, a public-use seaplane base in Moser Bay, Alaska
- Moser Channel, a passage spanned by the Seven Mile Bridge in the Florida Keys
- Moser Farm, a historic farm near Kirschnerville, New York

== Companies ==
- Moser Baer, a technology company based in New Delhi, India
- Moser (glass company), a Czech-based glass manufacturer
- Moser's Rides, an Italian amusement ride manufacturer
- Moser Schaffhausen AG, the parent company of H. Moser & Cie., a Swiss luxury watch manufacturer

== See also ==
- Kolmogorov–Arnold–Moser theorem, mathematical theorem of dynamical systems
- Moser Gender Planning Framework, a tool for gender analysis in development planning
- Moser number, the number represented by "2 in a megagon", where a "megagon" is a polygon with "mega" sides
- Moser polygon notation, a means of expressing certain extremely large numbers
- Moser research environment, a research environment led by Edvard Moser and May-Britt Moser
- Moser spindle, an undirected graph named after mathematicians Leo Moser and his brother William
- Moser–Trudinger inequality, a theorem in mathematical analysis
- Möser (surname)
