= Josef Moser =

Josef Moser may refer to:

- Josef Moser (cyclist) (1917–1944), Austrian Olympic cyclist
- Josef Moser (jurist) (born 1955), Austrian lawyer and politician
- Josef Moser (entomologist) (1861–1944), Austrian entomologist
