= Moser (surname) =

- Pronunciation: German: [ˈmoːzɐ] Italian: [ˈmɔːzer, moˈzɛr]
- Language: German, Italian

Origin
- Language: German
- Derivation: Moos
- Meaning: 'of the marsh'

Other names
- Alternative spelling: Mooser

Moser is a South German topographic surname, derived from the German word Moos, 'moss'. Notable people with the surname include:

- Aldo Moser (1934–2020), Italian racing cyclist
- Ana Beatriz Moser (born 1968), Brazilian volleyball player
- Angelica Moser (born 1997), Swiss pole vaulter
- Ann B. Moser (born 1940), American biochemist
- Annemarie Moser-Pröll (born 1953), Austrian skier
- Barry Moser (born 1940), American illustrator
- Benjamin Moser, (born 1976), American columnist and author
- Benjamin Moser (cross-country skier) (born 1997), Austrian cross-country skier
- Brian Moser (1935–2023), British documentary filmmaker
- Caroline Moser (born 1944), English urban anthropologist
- Christian Moser (ski jumper) (born 1972), Austrian ski jumper
- Christian Moser (mathematician) (1861–1935), Swiss actuary and mathematician
- Christian Moser (politician) (born 1989), German politician
- Chuck Moser (1918–1995), American football coach
- Claus Moser (1922–2015), statistician
- Edda Moser (born 1938), German soprano
- Edvard Moser (born 1962), Norwegian neuroscientist
- Edward W. Moser (1924–1976), American linguist
- Elfriede Moser-Rath (1926–1993), German ethnologist and folklorist
- Enzo Moser (1940-2008), Italian cyclist
- Fanny Moser (scientist) (1872-1953), Swiss-German zoologist
- Francesco Moser (born 1951), Italian cyclist
- Franziska Rochat-Moser (1966–2002), Swiss long-distance runner
- Fred J. Moser (1898-1993), American politician
- Friedrich Karl von Moser (1723–1798), German politician
- Gabriela Moser (1954–2019), Austrian politician
- Georg Moser (1923–1988), German catholic bishop
- George Michael Moser (1706–1783), English enameller
- Hans Moser (actor) (1880–1964), Austrian actor
- Hans Moser (director) (1944–2016), German director of pornographic films
- Hans Moser (rider) (1901–1974), Swiss Olympic equestrian
- Hans Moser (handballer) (born 1937), Romanian handballer and world champion
- Hans Heinz Moser (1936–2017), Swiss actor
- Hans Joachim Moser (1889–1967), German composer and musicologist
- Hilário Moser (born 1931), Brazilian Roman Catholic bishop
- Hugo Moser (1926–2003), Argentine screenwriter and producer
- Ignazio Moser (born 1992), Italian cyclist
- Jacob Moser (1839-1922), British wool merchant and philanthropist
- Johann Jakob Moser (1701–1785), German jurist
- Johannes Moser, German ethnologist
- Johannes Moser (born 1979), German-Canadian cellist
- Josef Moser (cyclist) (1917–1944), Austrian Olympic cyclist and soldier
- Josef Moser (entomologist) (1861–1944), Austrian priest and entomologist
- Josef Moser (jurist) (born 1955), Austrian jurist, lawyer, and politician
- Julius Moser (1863–1929), German entomologist and coleopterologist
- Jürgen Moser (1928–1999), mathematician (Kolmogorov-Arnold-Moser theorem)
- J.J. Moser (born 2000), Swiss ice hockey player
- Karl Moser (1860–1936), Swiss architect
- Kimberly Poore Moser (born 1962), American politician
- Koloman Moser (1868–1918), Austrian artist
- Leo Moser (1921–1970), mathematician (Moser polygon notation)
- Leon Moser (1942–1995), American murderer
- Lisa-Maria Moser (born 1991), Austrian tennis player
- Margaret Moser (1954–2017), American music critic, groupie and journalist
- Martina Moser (born 1986), Swiss footballer
- Mary Moser (1744–1819), English painter
- Mary B. Moser (1924–2013), American linguist
- May-Britt Moser (born 1963), Norwegian neuroscientist
- Meinhard Michael Moser (1924–2002), Austrian mycologist
- Mike Moser (born 1990), American basketball player
- Moreno Moser (born 1990), Italian cyclist
- Nikolaus Moser (born 1990), Austrian tennis player
- Otto von Moser (1860–1931), German general of the First World War
- Porter Moser (born 1968), American basketball coach
- Robert Moser (architect) (1833–1901), Swiss architect
- Rudolph Moser, German musician
- Sandra Moser (born 1969), Swiss actress
- Silvio Moser (1941–1974), Swiss racing driver
- Simon Moser (born 1989), Swiss ice hockey player
- Walter Moser (1881-1946), American baseball player

== Fictional characters ==
- Brian Moser, a fictional serial killer in the Dexter novel and television series.

== See also ==
- Möser (surname)
- Muser (surname)
