= Voser =

Voser is a surname. Notable people with the surname include:

- Kay Voser (born 1987), Swiss footballer
- Peter Voser (born 1958), Swiss businessman

== See also ==
- Moser (surname)
