= Audacity (audio editor) =

Open-source digital audio editor and recording software

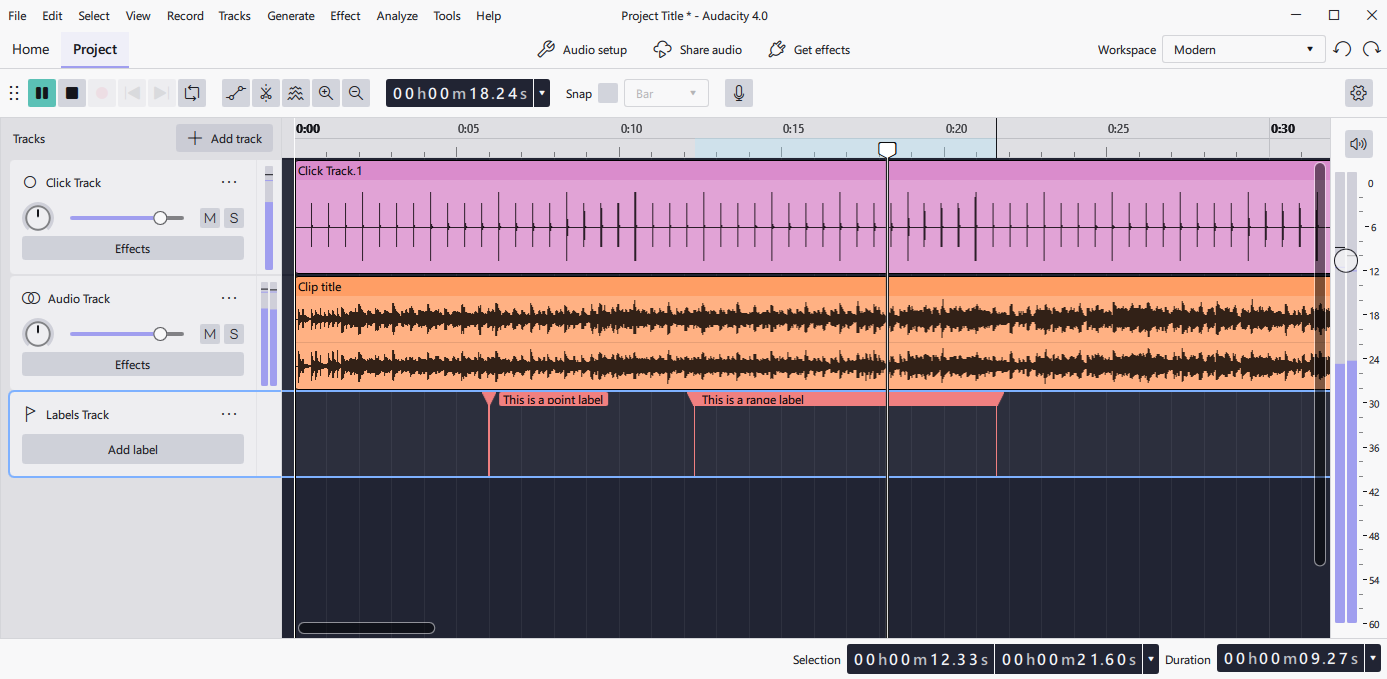
- Audacity showing the timeline, tracks, and basic controls
- Developers: Muse Group; The Audacity Team
- Release: May 28, 2000; 26 years ago
- Stable release: 4.0.1 / 30 September 2026; 27 days ago
- Written in: C++ (using the Qt6 toolkit)
- Operating system: Microsoft Windows, macOS, Linux, other Unix-like systems
- Platform: IA-32, x86-64, PowerPC, ARM64
- Available in: 87 languages
- List of languages: Afrikaans, Arabic, Armenian, Asturian, Amazigh, Albanian, Bengali, Basque, Bulgarian, Burmese, Belarusian, Breton, Bosnian, Catalan, Chinese (simplified), Chinese (traditional), Corsican, Croatian Czech, Danish, Dutch, English (United States), English (United Kingdon), Esperanto, Estonian, Finnish, French, Galician, German, Greek, Goidelic, Georgian, Hebrew, Hungarian, Hindi, Irish, Italian, Indonesian, Igbo, Icelandic, Japanese, Khmer, Korean, Lithuanian, Latvian, Macedonian, Malayalam, Marathi, Malay, Maltese, Norwegian (Bokmål) or (Nynorsk), Persian, Polish, Portuguese, Brazilian Portuguese, Filipino, Faroese, Romanian, Russian, Slovak, Slovenian, Swedish (Modern), Swedish Tradition, Spanish, Sicilian, Serbian (Latin) or (Cyrillic), Turkish, Tamil, Telugu, Tajik, Thai, Tagalog, Ukrainian, Uzbek, Valenican, Vietnamese,Welsh Yoruba
- Type: Digital audio editor
- License: GPLv3 (software), CC BY 3.0 (documentation)
- Website: www.audacityteam.org
- Repository: github.com/audacity

Audacity is a free and open-source digital audio editor and recording application software, which is available for Windows, macOS, Linux, and other Unix-like operating systems.

As of February 15, 2026, Audacity is the second most popular download at FossHub, with over 114.2 million downloads since March 2015. It was previously served by Google Code and SourceForge, where it was downloaded over 200 million times. It has been part of Muse Group since 2021.

Audacity 4.0 is distributed under version 3 of the GNU General Public License (GPLv3). Many individual source files are also available under GPL version 2 or later. Its documentation is licensed under Creative Commons Attribution 3.0.

== History ==
The project was started in the autumn of 1999 by Dominic Mazzoni and Roger Dannenberg at Carnegie Mellon University, initially under the name CMU Visual Audio. On May 28, 2000, Audacity was released as Audacity 0.8 to the public.

Mazzoni eventually left CMU to pursue software development and in particular development of Audacity, with Dannenberg remaining at CMU and continuing development of Nyquist, a scripting language which Audacity uses for some effects.

Over the years, additional volunteer contributors emerged, including James Crook who started the fork DarkAudacity to experiment with a new look and other UX changes. Most of its changes were eventually incorporated into the mainline version and the fork ended.

In April 2021, it was announced that Muse Group (owners of MuseScore and Ultimate Guitar) would acquire the Audacity trademark and continue to develop the application, which remains free and open source.

In October 2024, the development of version 4 switched from wxWidgets to Qt, reusing the framework of MuseScore 4. In September 2026, Audacity officially released version 4.0.

== Features and use ==
In addition to recording audio from multiple sources, Audacity can be used for post-processing of all types of audio, including effects such as normalization, trimming, and fading in and out. It has been used to record and mix entire albums, such as by Tune-Yards. It is currently used in the Sound Creation unit of the UK OCR National Level 2 ICT course.

=== Recording ===
Audacity can record multiple tracks at once, provided the sound card supports it. In addition to a normal mode, recordings can be scheduled ("Timer Record"), or used in a Punch in and roll fashion.

=== Non-destructive editing ===
Historically, Audacity is a destructive editor, meaning all changes are directly applied to the waveform. This comes with certain benefits but means that any change made cannot be tweaked later on without undoing all changes in-between. For a long time, non-destructive editing was exclusive to volume envelopes and playback rates, but since version 3, this has been extended to clip trimming and effects.

=== Importing, exporting, and conversions ===
Audacity natively imports and exports WAV, AIFF, MP3, Ogg Vorbis, and all file formats supported by the libsndfile library. An additional library, FFmpeg, is necessary to import and export proprietary formats such as M4A (AAC) and WMA.

Due to patent licensing concerns, FFmpeg is not bundled with Audacity, but rather has to be downloaded separately.

In conjunction with batch processing features, Audacity can be used to convert files from one format to another, or to digitize records, tapes, or MiniDiscs.

=== Customizability and extensibility ===
Audacity 4.0 supports VST3 and Nyquist plugins, as well as LV2 plugins on Linux and Audio Units on macOS. Support for LADSPA and Vamp plugins, available in earlier versions, is absent from version 4.0. The release also omits the Macro Manager and scripting pipe used for external scripting.

Audacity is somewhat customizable and supports arbitrary arrangements of its toolbars, custom themes and toggling of several features.

In January 2024, Intel introduced some AI-powered capabilities for Audacity as part of its OpenVINO plugin suite.

=== Audio analysis ===
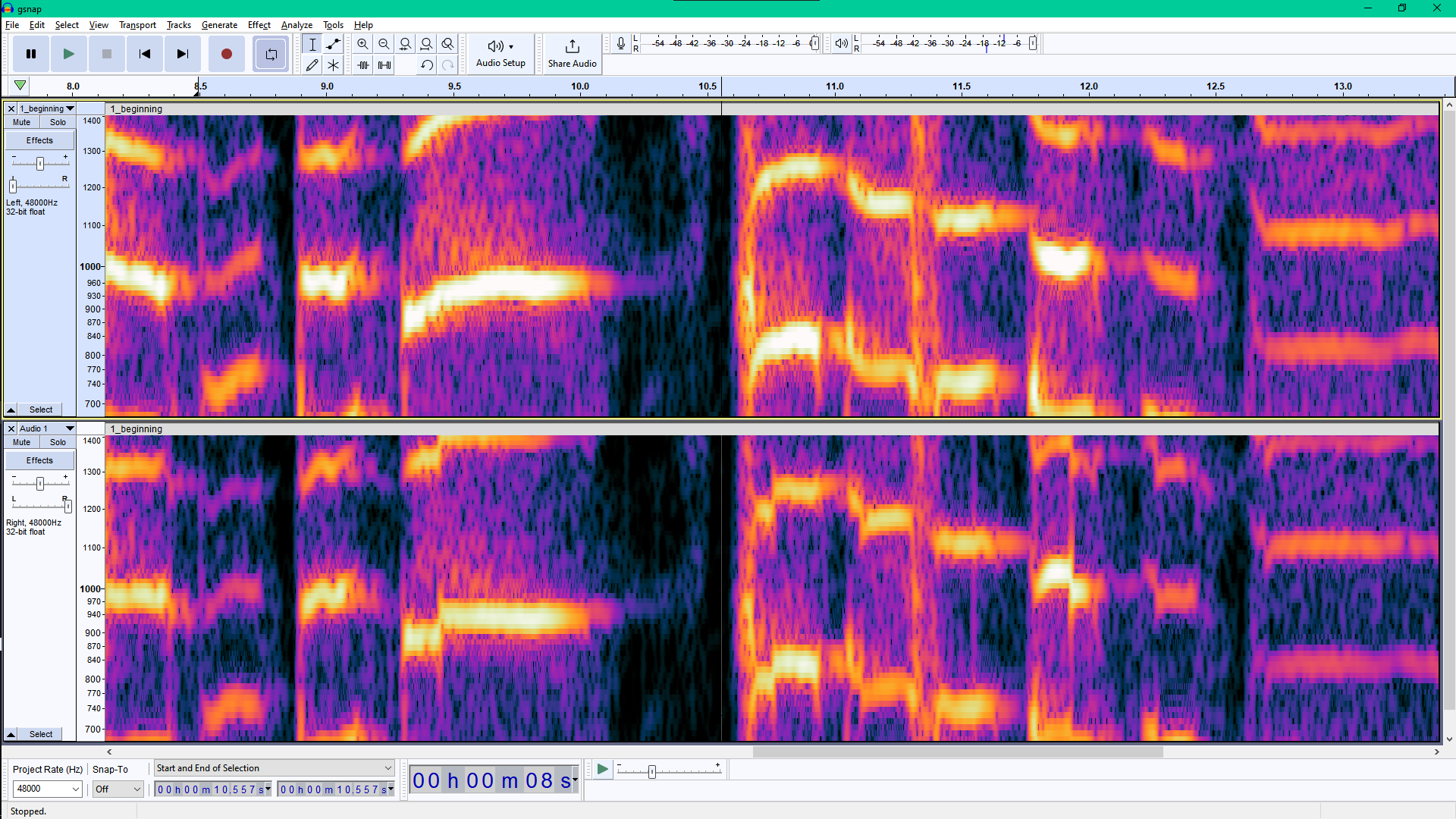
Screenshot of Audacity on Windows showing spectrograms of an audio clip with portamento (upper panel) and the same clip after applying pitch correction, showing frequencies clamped to discrete values (lower panel)

Audacity has several features to allow for spectrum analysis using the Fourier transform algorithm and spectrograms. As with effects, additional analysis plugins can be added, such as ones that check audiobooks for ACX compatibility.

=== Limitations ===
Audacity 4.0 does not support MIDI editing or virtual instruments, features commonly found in digital audio workstations.

As of September 2026, no official version of Audacity is available for iOS or Android.

=== Other features ===
Audacity can make precise adjustments to speed (tempo) while maintaining pitch, to synchronize audio with video or for precise running time. It also has a large array of digital effects and plug-ins, including: noise reduction based on sampling the noise to be minimized, vocal reduction and isolation for creation of karaoke tracks and isolated vocal tracks, pitch adjustment maintaining speed, and speed adjustment maintaining pitch. Audacity also has support for multi-channel modes with arbitrary sampling rates, and to 32-bit float sample depth. It can also detect dropout errors made while recording with an overburdened CPU.

== Language support ==
In addition to Afrikaans, Arabic, Armenian, Asturian, Amazigh, Albanian, Bengali, Basque, Bulgarian, Burmese, Belarusian, Breton, Bosnian, Catalan, Chinese (simplified), Chinese (traditional), Corsican, Croatian, Czech, Danish, Dutch, English (United States), English (United Kingdon), Esperanto, Estonian, Finnish, French, Galician, German, Greek, Goidelic, Georgian, Hebrew, Hungarian, Hindi, Irish, Italian, Indonesian, Igbo, Icelandic, Japanese, Khmer, Korean, Lithuanian, Latvian, Macedonian, Malayalam, Marathi, Malay, Maltese, Norwegian (Bokmål) or (Nynorsk), Persian, Polish, Portuguese, Brazilian Portuguese, Filipino, Faroese, Romanian, Russian, Slovak, Slovenian, Swedish (Modern), Swedish Tradition, Spanish, Sicilian, Serbian (Latin) or (Cyrillic), Turkish, Tamil, Telugu, Tajik, Thai, Tagalog, Ukrainian, Uzbek, Valenican, Vietnamese,Welsh Yoruba.

The documentation, the Audacity Manual, is available only in English. The Audacity Forum offers technical support in English.

== Architecture ==
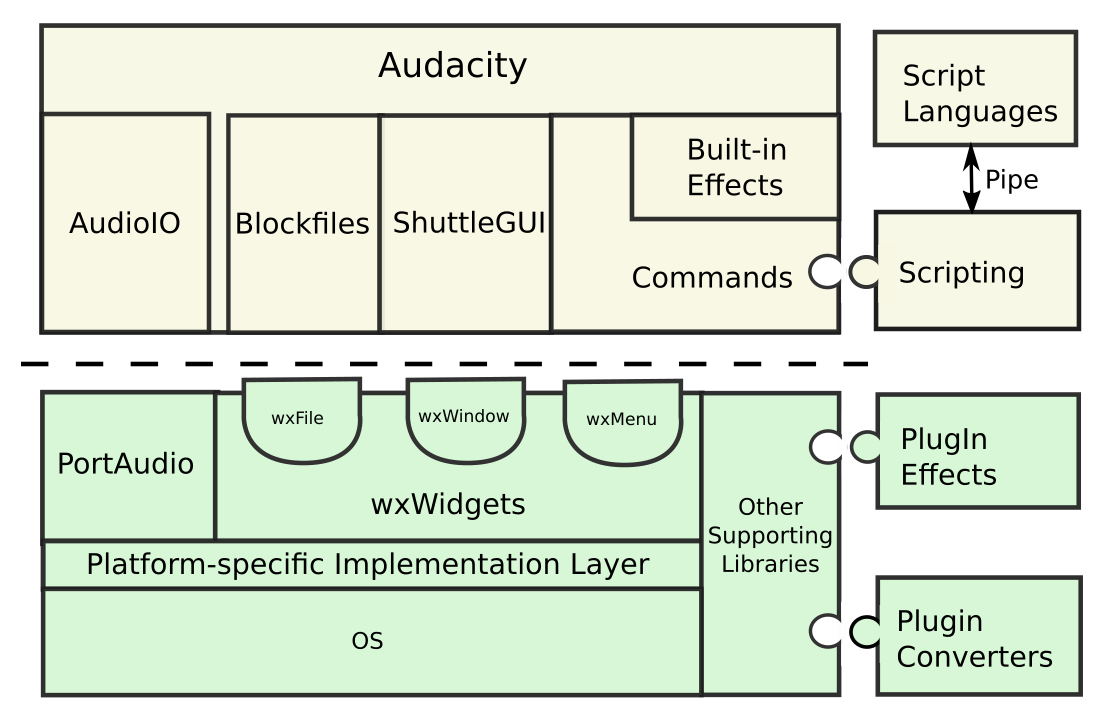
Software architecture of Audacity showing how the software is built in layers

The diagram illustrates Audacity's layers and modules. Note the three important classes within wxWidgets, each of which has a reflection in Audacity.

Higher-level abstractions result from related lower-level ones. For example, the BlockFile system is a reflection of and is built on wxWidgets' wxFiles. Lower down in the diagram is a narrow strip for platform-specific implementation layers.

Both wxWidgets and PortAudio are OS abstraction layers, containing conditional code that chooses different implementations depending on the target platform.

== Reception ==
As free and open-source software, Audacity is very popular in education, encouraging its developers to make the user interface easier for students and teachers.

Audacity won the SourceForge 2007 and 2009 Community Choice Award for Best Project for Multimedia.

Jamie Lendino of PC Magazine recently rated it 4/5 stars Excellent and said: "If you're looking to get started in podcasting or recording music, it's tough to go wrong with Audacity. A powerful, free, open-source audio editor that's been available for years, Audacity is still the go-to choice for quick-and-dirty audio work."

CNET rated Audacity 5/5 stars, calling it "feature-rich and flexible". Preston Gralla of PC World said: "If you're interested in creating, editing, and mixing you'll want Audacity." Jack Wallen of Tech Republic praised its features and ease-of-use.

In The Art of Unix Programming (2003), open-source software advocate Eric S. Raymond wrote of Audacity: "The central virtue of this program is that it has a superbly transparent and natural user interface, one that erects as few barriers between the user and the sound file as possible."

Some reviewers and users have criticized Audacity for its inconvenient UX design, unsightly GUI and comparative lack of features compared with Adobe Audition. Matthew McLean wrote: "Audacity looks a bit more dated and basic, but this will be appealing to many folks who're just starting out".

In May 2021, after the project was acquired by Muse Group, there was a draft proposal to add opt-in telemetry to the code to record application usage. Some users responded negatively, with accusations of turning Audacity into spyware. The company reversed course, falling back to error/crash reporting and optional update checking instead. Another controversy in July 2021 resulted from a change to the privacy policy which said that although personal data was stored on servers in the European Economic Area, the program would "occasionally [be] required to share your personal data with our main office in Russia and our external counsel in the USA". In July 2021, the Audacity team apologized for the policy’s wording, removed the provision discouraging use by children under 13, and clarified its statements about data collection and disclosure.

== Version history ==
This table shows the major and minor releases of Audacity. Patches are omitted.

Version	Date	Major changes and notes
4.0	September 3, 2026	User interface rebuilt using Qt. New clip editing tools and workspaces. New project file format, .aup4. Cloud integration with audio.com.
3.7	October 30, 2024	Fixes bugs.
3.6	July 16, 2024	Adds master effects, new compressor and limiter, new themes, and increased performance.
3.5	April 22, 2024	Adds Cloud saving, automatic tempo detection and non-destructive pitch shifting.
3.4	November 2, 2023	Adds a musical view, time stretching and a new exporter.
3.3	April 24, 2023	Mostly focused on refactoring. A preview of a beats and measures feature is added.
3.2	September 22, 2022	Added real-time effects, VST3 support and a streamlined interface. A cloud audio sharing integration with audio.com is added.
3.1	October 28, 2021	Introduced clip handles, smart clips and playback looping. In April 2022, an official Audacity app was added to the Microsoft Store.
3.0	March 17, 2021	Introduced a new project file format, .aup3, using an SQLite database to store each project in a single database file.
2.4	May 15, 2020	Adds Loudness, Noise Gate and Spectral Delete effects and adds Side-by-side view of waveforms and spectrograms.
2.3	September 29, 2018	Adds Punch-and-Roll recording and upgrades to Macros, Play-at-Speed, Toolbars. From 2.3.2 on, a mod-script-pipe for driving Audacity from Python (can be enabled in Preferences).
2.2	November 2, 2017	Ports changes from Dark Audacity to Audacity, adding themes. Additionally, MIDI playback is added. Four user-selectable colorways for waveform display in audio tracks (version 2.2.1 on).
2.1	March 29, 2015	Adds Real-Time preview of some effects. Saving and loading user presets for effect settings across sessions (version 2.1.0 on) Scrubbing (audio) (version 2.1.1 and later). This is the first version to require SSE2-compatible CPU at least on Windows.
2.0	March 13, 2012	Adds a Device Toolbar to manage inputs and outputs, Timer Record and a Mixer Board view with per-track VU meters. Compared to the last 1.3.x release it is not a big improvement; the major version increment was chosen to signify a new stable version after many years of only beta releases.
1.3	November 28, 2005	Introduces clips and adds performance improvements for large projects. Version 1.3.2 and later supported Free Lossless Audio Codec (FLAC). Version 1.3.6 and later also supported additional formats such as WMA, AAC, AMR and AC3 via the optional FFmpeg library. All of the 1.3.x releases were considered "beta".
1.2	March 3, 2004	Adds many new effects and tools.
1.0	June 11, 2002	1.0 release. 1.1 was released on the same day.
0.8	May 28, 2000	Initial test version.

== See also ==
- Comparison of free software for audio
- List of Linux audio software
- Multitrack recording

== Sources ==
- Crook, James (2012). "Audacity". In Brown, Amy; Wilson, Greg (eds.). The Architecture of Open Source Applications. Vol. 1.
