= Sheet Music Plus =

Global online retailer of sheet music

- Website type: E-commerce
- Available in: English
- Owner: Hal Leonard
- Creator: Nick Babchuk
- Website: www.sheetmusicplus.com
- Commercial: Yes
- Registration: Optional
- Launched: 1996; 30 years ago
- Current status: Active

Sheet Music Plus, also known as sheetmusicplus.com, is a global online retailer of sheet music, located in Milwaukee, Wisconsin, United States. Founded in 1995 by Nicholas Babchuk, Sheet Music Plus offers the largest selection of sheet music, with more than 2 million titles.

== Description ==
Serving musicians and music educators around the world, Sheet Music Plus sells sheet music, instruments, and music-related gear and accessories. Supported ensembles and instruments include choir, concert band, orchestra, piano, guitar, brass, woodwinds, strings, and more. Available musical genres cover classical, jazz, blues, rock, opera, bluegrass, pop, country, Broadway, movie soundtracks, film scores, Latin, R&B, and more.

Sheet Music Plus works with thousands of publishers worldwide—from major publishers like Hal Leonard and Alfred Music, to independent publishers via ArrangeMe. Sheet Music Plus is active in the music community and hires musicians when possible.

=== Digital Print Sheet Music ===
Sheet Music Plus specializes in both printed and digital sheet music. Their digital print service offers sheet music titles that are available to print instantly. They currently offer over 1,300,000 digital print titles from a variety of publishers, including Hal Leonard and Alfred Music.

=== Digital Print Publishing ===
In 2013, the company introduced a new service, Digital Print Publishing (also known as SMP Press and now ArrangeMe), which offers independent composers and arrangers the ability to publish and sell their music digitally in the online catalog. Composers earn up to 50% commission for their titles and gain worldwide exposure. Sheet Music Plus has published over 780,000 titles digitally from independent publishers.

== History ==
In 1995, Nick Babchuk founded MusicianStore.com, a self-run pilot website, on the 1300 block of Pacific Ave. in San Francisco. At this time they sold guitar strings, drum heads, and musician's accessories in addition to sheet music. According to former CEO Keith Cerny, the company was "profitable from almost the very beginning". As demand for sheet music became apparent along with advantages of shipping printed material the name was changed to Sheet Music Plus. In 2005 the warehouse was moved from San Francisco to Emeryville, CA. The new 25,000 sq. ft. warehouse allowed for more space and better access to shipping routes. Sheet Music Plus currently offers over 30,000 in-stock titles, ready to ship within 24 hours.

In 2007, the company reached 550,000 titles in the catalog. In 2008, Keith Cerny assumed the role of CEO when founder Nick Babchuk became Chairman of the company. Mr. Cerny oversaw the creation of an advanced company data center in San Francisco, which set the foundation for the company's technological future. In 2010, Cerny resigned to become General Director of the Dallas Opera. Long-time Sheet Music Plus employee Jenny Silva succeeded him.

Under Silva's tenure, the company expanded the catalog to over one million titles. She also oversaw the creation and development of the popular Digital Print Publishing program for composers, arrangers and songwriters. Mrs. Silva was also instrumental in the partnership with the Canadian Choral Center in 2012. Silva remained in her role as CEO until she resigned on May 31, 2018.

On 27 February 2017, it was announced that Sverica Capital Management would sell Sheet Music Plus to music publisher Hal Leonard. In 2023, Hal Leonard was purchased by Muse Group, bringing Sheet Music Plus under their purview.

== Canadian Choral Center ==
In 2012 Sheet Music Plus partnered with the Canadian Choral Center in Winnipeg, Manitoba in Canada. The founder, Judy Pringle, is a choral music specialist and ran the company herself for many years. The Canadian Choral Center ships to over 10,000 customers across Canada with their exclusive customs-free shipping to Canada. Judy publishes a regular choral newsletter and is a prominent figure in the Canadian choral music scene.

== Awards and honors ==
- Top 500 Internet Retailer 2007 - 2014
- Stevie Award Finalist 2005-2007
