= Moser Gender Planning Framework =

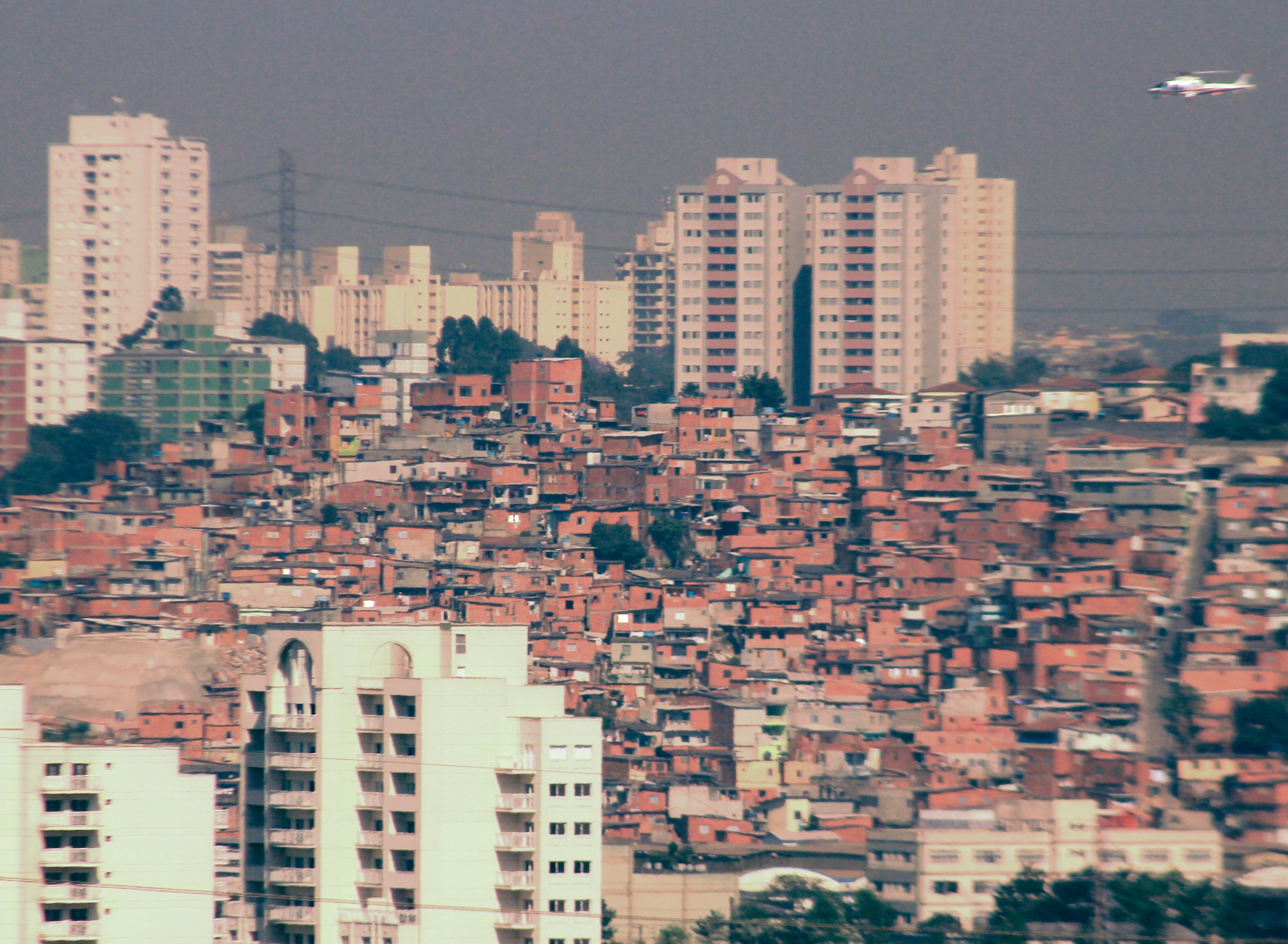
São Paulo favelas. Much of the Moser Gender Planning Framework is focused in improving women's conditions in the Third World.

The Moser Gender Planning Framework is a tool for gender analysis in development planning. It was developed by Caroline Moser. The goal is to free women from subordination and allow them to achieve equality, equity, and empowerment.

== Origin ==
Moser developed the Framework for a Gender and Development (GAD) approach to development planning in the 1980s while working at the Development Planning Unit (DPU) of the University of London. Working with Caren Levy, she expanded it into a methodology for gender policy and planning. Moser and Levy published A Theory and Method of Gender Planning – Meeting Women's Practical and Strategic Needs as a DPU working paper in 1986. The framework is based on Moser's concepts of gender roles and gender needs, and her views on the ways policies should approach gender and development planning.

== Overview ==
The Moser framework follows the Gender and Development approach in emphasizing the importance of gender relations. As with the WID-based Harvard Analytical Framework, it includes collection of quantitative empirical facts. Going further, it investigates the reasons and processes that lead to conventions of access and control. The Moser Framework includes gender roles identification, gender needs assessment, disaggregating control of resources and decision making within the household, planning for balancing the triple role, distinguishing between different aims in interventions and involving women and gender-aware organizations in planning. The framework acknowledges a political element to gender planning, and assumes that the process will have to deal with conflicts.

The framework rests on three basic concepts: the triple role of women, practical and strategic gender needs and categories of WID/GAD policy approaches. The triple role consists of reproductive, productive and community-managing activities. Practical needs are ones that, if met, help women in current activities. Strategic needs are needs that, if met, transform the balance of power between men and women. Different categories of WID/GAD policy approach, which may or may not be appropriate, include welfare (top-down handouts), equity, anti-poverty, efficiency and empowerment.

== Tools ==
The framework provides six tools.

- Tool 1 identifies gender roles: what women, men, boys and girls do in various productive, reproductive and community-managing activities.
- Tool 2 identifies the practical and strategic needs of women.
- Tool 3 defines an access and control profile for resources and benefits of economic activity.
- Tool 4 examines the impact that a new policy, project or program will have on the three roles. A change addressing one area may affect others in a positive or negative sense.
- Tool 5 looks at how welfare, equity, anti-poverty, efficiency or empowerment approaches will address practical or strategic needs. The approaches are not mutually exclusive.
- Tool 6 looks at way women and gender-aware organisations and individuals can be involved in the process.

== Limitations ==
Although widely used, the framework has been subject to some criticism. The concept of gender roles may tend to obscure the concept of gender relationships. It may give a sense of a stable balance, acceptance of each person's normal activities and rights, when in fact there is ongoing negotiation, conflict and compromise. The framework does not consider evolution of the socioeconomic structure over time. The framework only addresses gender inequality and does not consider other types of inequality such as caste, class or race.

Naila Kabeer has argued that the triple role concept obscures the distinction between activity and outcome. For example, the outcome of child care could be achieved by the mother at home, by a communal creche or through paid private or state facilities. These are very different in terms of their effect on women.
