= Muser (surname) =

Muser is a surname.

== People with the surname ==
- Marie Müser (born 1997), German politician
- Tony Muser (born 1947), American former professional baseball player
- Wolf Muser (1950–2022), German actor

== See also ==
- Muse (surname)
- Moser (surname)
