= The Muse =

The Muses are the inspirational goddesses of literature, science, and the arts in Greek mythology.

The Muse may also refer to:

- "The Muse" (Star Trek: Deep Space Nine), episode from the fourth season
- The Muse (1999 film), a film starring Albert Brooks and Sharon Stone
  - The Muse (soundtrack), soundtrack by Elton John for the 1999 film of the same name
- The Muse (2025 film), a Canadian short documentary film
- The Muse (website), New York City based website career center
- The Muse, a section on the website Jezebel
- The Muse (student paper) a student run newspaper based in St. John's, Newfoundland and Labrador
- "The Muse", a song by Laura Marling from the album A Creature I Don't Know
- The Muse (album) by The Wood Brothers

== See also ==
- Muse (disambiguation)
