= Women in development =

Approach of development projects

Women in development is an approach of development projects that emerged in the 1960s, calling for treatment of women's issues in development projects. It is the integration of women into the global economies by improving their status and assisting in total development. However, the priority of Women in Development later became concerned with how women could contribute to development of away from its initial goals of addressing equity. Later, the Gender and development (GAD) approach proposed more emphasis on gender relations rather than seeing women's issues in isolation.

== Concepts ==
In Africa, one of the first to recognise the importance of women in farming was Hermann Baumann in 1928, with his classic article The Division of Work According to African Hoe Culture. Kaberry published a much-quoted study of women in the Cameroon in 1952, and empirical data on male and female activities was documented in Nigerian Cocoa Farmers published in 1956 by Galletti, Baldwin and Dina. Ester Boserup's pioneering Women's Role in Economic Development brought greater, attention to the importance of women's role in agricultural economies and the lack of alignment of development projects with this reality. In the preface to her book, Boserup wrote that "in the vast and ever-growing literature on economic development, reflections on the particular problems of women are few and far between". She showed that women often did more than half the agricultural work, in one case as much as 80%, and that they also played an important role in trade.

In other countries, many women were severely underemployed. According to the 1971 census in India, women constituted 48.2% of the population but only 13% of economic activity. Women were excluded from many types of formal job, so 94% of the female workforce was engaged in the unorganized sector employed in agriculture, agro-forestry, fishery, handicrafts and so on. With growing awareness of women's issues, in the 1970s development planners began to try to integrate women better into their projects to make them more productive. The WID approach initially accepted existing social structures in the recipient country and looked at how to better integrate women into existing development initiatives. The straightforward goal was to increase the productivity and earnings of women.

== Activities ==
The United Nations Development Program (UNDP) established a special Division for Women in Development, promoting concrete action to ensure that women participate in UNDP projects. The United Nations paper International Development Strategy for the Third United Nations Development Decade, issued in 1980, recognized a number of Women in Development issues. It called for women to play an active role in all sectors and at all levels of the Program of Action adopted by the World Conference of the United Nations Decade for Women, both as agents and beneficiaries. Policies on industrialization, food and agriculture, science and technology and social development should all involve women.

A 1985 report by the OECD Development Center surveyed a broad sample of development projects aimed at women. It concluded that many were too welfare-oriented. It said "future projects should avoid the home economics approach and focus on income-generating activities which are relevant and useful to the women participating". It also noted the lack of information about women's roles and activities, and called for greater research as input to development projects.

The Harvard Analytical Framework attempted to address these concerns. The framework has its origins in 1980 with a request to Harvard University for WID training from the World Bank. James Austin, who was well known for case-method training at Harvard, led a team with three women experienced in WID work: Catherine Overholt, Mary Anderson and Kathleen Cloud. These became known as the "Harvard Team". The framework was elaborated by the Harvard Institute for International Development in collaboration with the WID office of USAID, and was first described in 1984 by Catherine Overholt and others. It was one of the earliest of such frameworks. The starting point for the framework was the assumption that it makes economic sense for development aid projects to allocate resources to women as well as men, which will make development more efficient – a position named the "efficiency approach".

In November 1990 the leaders of the South Asian Association for Regional Cooperation (SAARC) countries endorsed recommendations of the second SAARC ministerial meeting of Women in Development held in June 1990, agreeing that the years 1991–2000 should be observed as the "SAARC Decade of the Girl Child". A wide range of recommendations for improving the development of female children were accepted.

== Criticism ==
The validity of the basic assumptions of the WID approach have been criticized by some, while other consider that it does not go far enough. The latter group says it ignores the larger social processes that affect women's lives and their reproductive roles. The approach does not address the root causes of gender inequalities. The Gender and Development (GAD) approach in the 1980s attempted to redress the problem, using gender analysis to develop a broader view. The approach is more concerned with relationships, the way in which men and women participate in development processes, rather than strictly focusing on women's issues.

In a 1988 paper Women in Development: Defining the Issues for the World Bank, Paul Collier argued that gender-neutral public policies may be inadequate, and gender-specific policies may be required to more effectively alleviate problems. In at least some countries, women have become increasingly involved in financial budgeting and management and since the 1995 Beijing Conference on Women there has been a surge in gender-responsive budgeting.
