= Muse Group =

Music software and education company

Muse Group MuseCY Holdings Ltd.
- Type: Limited company
- Industry: Music software Music education
- Predecessor: Ultimate Guitar
- Founded: 2021
- Headquarters: Limassol, Cyprus
- Products: Ultimate Guitar; MuseScore; Audacity; StaffPad
- Number of employees: 200+ (2024)
- Subsidiaries: Hal Leonard
- Website: mu.se

Muse Group (MuseCY Holdings Ltd.) is a Cypriot software and education company specialised in making tools and resources for music composition, music production and music education. Established in 1998 as Ultimate Guitar, it became Muse Group in 2021 following several acquisitions such as MuseScore and Audacity. It is now headquartered in Limassol, Cyprus, and became the parent company of Hal Leonard in 2023.

== History ==
Former logo

In 2017, the company acquired the open source music notation tool MuseScore (now MuseScore Studio) and its sheet music sharing platform MuseScore.com, respectively launched in 2002 and 2010.

In 2021, it acquired the open source audio editor Audacity, a software project originally started in 2000.

In 2023, Muse Group acquired American music publishing company Hal Leonard, founded in 1947, and its entire catalogue of sheet music and music learning resources.

== Products and Acquisitions ==
Products
Logo	Name	Description	Platform		Year	
	Ultimate Guitar	Online sharing platform for guitarists.	Web	Proprietary	Launched	1998
Acquired stake of Dean Zelinsky Guitars						2012
	Agile Partners	Several software products, including:			Acquired	2013
	Agile Partners	SteadyTune	Desktop/Mobile	Proprietary	Acquired	2013
	Agile Partners	AmpKit	Desktop/Mobile	Proprietary	Acquired	2013
	Tonebridge	Virtual effects pedal for guitars.	Mobile	Proprietary	Launched	2016
	MuseScore Studio	Music notation app.	Desktop	Open source	Acquired	2017
	MuseScore.com	Online score sharing platform.	Web/Mobile	Proprietary	Acquired	2017
—N/a	Crescendo	Music education app.	Desktop/Mobile	Proprietary	Acquired	2018
	MuseClass	Music education app.	Web/Mobile	Proprietary	Launched	2020
	Audacity	Audio editor.	Desktop	Open source	Acquired	2021
	StaffPad	Music notation app.	Mobile	Proprietary	Acquired	2021
	MuseHub	Audio/music store for MuseScore and Audacity.	Desktop	Proprietary	Launched	2022
	Audio.com	Online music sharing platform.	Web	Proprietary	Launched	2022
	Hal Leonard	Sheet music, method books, and several software products, including:			Acquired	2023
	Hal Leonard	Noteflight	Web	Proprietary	Acquired	2023
	Hal Leonard	Sheet Music Plus	Web	Proprietary	Acquired	2023
