= Catherine Overholt =

Catherine A. Overholt
- Born: 1942 (age 83–84)
- Occupation: Health Economist
- Known for: Gender Analysis Framework

Catherine A. Overholt (born 1942) is a health economist who has assisted many development agencies with gender issues, health economics, case writing and case method training. She is part of the team that developed the Gender Analysis Framework (1984) in cooperation with the Harvard Institute for International Development and the USAID Office of Women in Development.

== Career ==
Overholt studied at the Harvard University School of Public Health, where she obtained a doctorate in Health Economics. She became a Lecturer at Harvard's School of Public Health. She has taught workshops on discussion teaching and has directed case development projects. Overholt has undertaken fieldwork in Africa and Latin America. For example, in 1981 Overholt and Richard Goldman published a study of the nutritional impact of a project to increase the productivity of small farmers by introducing a high-yielding maize. The study found that the increase in income had very little effect on increasing calorie intake and made no measurable difference to nourishment of preschool children. The same year she participated in a study of subsidized milk in Mexico. Between 1980 and 1985 Overholt was involved in development of the Harvard Analytical Framework, used to determine how to efficiently allocate resources between men and women in aid projects.

Mary B Anderson and Overholt formed Collaborative for Development Action (CDA) as a small consulting company in 1985, working in the areas of health policy, primary and secondary education, rural development, alternative technologies and evaluations. Overholt was vice president of the company. In 1986 as a consultant for the USAID Technologies for Primary Health Care (Pritech) project she undertook an evaluation of aid projects in Haiti with Polly Harrison and Maggie Huff. CDA, primarily government-funded, developed the People Oriented Planning Framework for refugee programs and was also involved in work that led to the Do No Harm, Reflecting on Peace Practice, and Corporate Engagement projects.

In 1991 Overholt was co-author with James Austin and Ann Sweet of an essay called To See Ourselves as Others See Us: The Rewards of Classroom Observation. This explores the value to a teacher of taking the difficult step of bringing a colleague into the classroom to observe and provide feedback, and has been widely quoted. Overholt retired from CDA to run a small farm that supports reforestation in rural Mexico.

== Gender Analysis Frameworks ==
Overholt is co-author of Gender Roles in Development Projects: A Case Book (1985) with Mary Anderson, Kathleen Cloud and James E. Austin. This book documents the Harvard Development Framework, or Gender Analysis Framework, a groundbreaking approach to allocating development aid based on gender analysis. Development of the framework began in 1980 when the World Bank Women in Development (WID) Adviser requested help from Harvard to provide training to World Bank staff. James Austin, a case-method trainer at Harvard, headed the team, and brought in Catherine Overholt, Mary Anderson and Kathleen Cloud, all of whom had WID experience. They developed the four-part framework for analyzing the division of labour between men and women, and determining their access and control of resources. The neutral, fact-based approach with its emphasis on economic efficiency played a leading role in helping aid providers to understand the importance of allocating resources to women.

Over a ten-year period CDA worked with the United Nations High Commissioner for Refugees (UNHCR) to develop an approach for programs to assist women refugees, the People Oriented Planning Framework (POP). Overholt, Mary Anderson and Anne Brazeau co-authored A Framework for People-Oriented Planning in Refugee Situations Taking Account of Women, Man and Children: A Practical Planning Tool for Refugee Workers, published by the UNHCR in 1992. The POP is adapted from the Harvard Framework with modifications to deal with refugee situations, and attempts to overcome some of the weaknesses in the earlier framework.

== Bibliography ==
Overholt has authored or co-authored many papers and books. A sample:

- Beatrice L. Rogers; Richard H. Goldman; Catherine Overholt (1981). Study V: Consumer food price subsidies: Study VI : Agricultural production, technical change, and nutritional goals. Oelschlaeger, Gunn & Hain. ISBN 0-89946-084-4.
- Catherine Overholt; Mary Anderson; Kathleen Cloud; James E. Austin (1985). Gender roles in development projects: a case book. Kumarian Press. ISBN 0-931816-15-7.
- Catherine Overholt; Peter Cross (1986). Costa Rica: health sector overview : a report. USAID. Pritech project.
- James Austin; Catherine Overholt (1988). "NUTRITION POLICY: Building the Bridge Between Science and Politics". Annu. Rev. Nutr. 8: 1–20. doi:10.1146/annurev.nu.08.070188.000245. PMID 3060160.
- Mary B. Anderson, James E. Austin, Catherine Overholt, Maria Eugenia Arias, Sabiha Syed, Virginia Casey, J.E. Austin Associates, The Collaborative for Development Action, Inc (1989). Gender analysis for project design: UNFPA training manuel. UNFPA.
- Mary B. Anderson, James E. Austin, Catherine Overholt, Maria Eugenia Arias, United Nations Fund for Population Activities (1989). Analyse des distinctions fondées sur le sexe aux fins de l'élaboration des projets: FNUAP manuel de formation. FNUAP par J.E. Austin Associates et the Collaborative for Development Action, Inc.
- Aruna Rao; Mary B. Anderson; Catherine Overholt (1991). Gender analysis in development planning: a case book. Kumarian Press. ISBN 0-931816-61-0.
- Catherine Overholt, Margaret K. Saunders, Economic Development Institute (Washington, D.C.) (1996). Policy choices and practical problems in health economics: cases from Latin America and the Caribbean. World Bank Publications. ISBN 0-8213-3012-8.
