= Necessity is the mother of invention =

Proverb about what drives innovation

"Necessity is the mother of invention" is a proverb. It states that the primary driving force for most new inventions is a need.

== Meaning ==
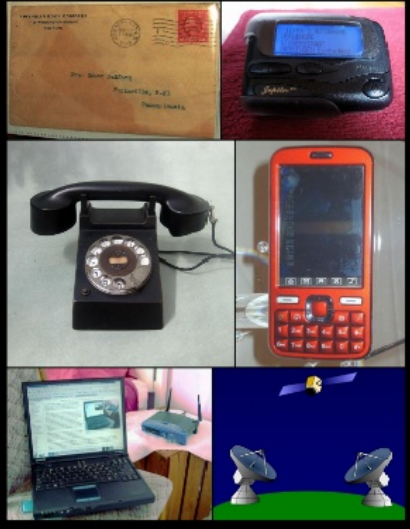
The need to communicate led to the creation of different communication devices.

On Lexico, the proverb has been defined as "When the need for something becomes imperative, you are forced to find ways of getting or achieving it." According to the Cambridge Dictionary, this is "an expression that means that if you really need to do something, you will think of a way of doing it." Longman dictionary has defined the proverb as: "if someone really needs to do something, they will find a way of doing it."

== History ==
One of the earliest recorded instances of the proverb is in one of Aesop’s Fables, “The Crow and the Pitcher” from the mid 6th century BCE. Plato's Republic says "our need will be the real creator", which Jowett's 1894 translation rendered loosely as "The true creator is necessity, who is the mother of our invention."

The connection of mother and necessity is documented in Latin and in English in the 16th century: William Horman quoted the Latin phrase Mater artium necessitas ("The mother of invention is necessity") in 1519; Roger Ascham said "Necessitie, the inventour of all goodnesse" in 1545. In 1608, George Chapman, in his two-part play The Conspiracy and Tragedy of Charles, Duke of Byron, used a very similar phrase: "The great Mother / Of all productions, grave Necessity." And the exact phrase is used by Richard Franck in 1658.

The phrase was used in medieval French and can be found in a collection of proverbs dating to 1485-1490, and is included with another saying, "Hunger makes people resourceful," and an illustration of one man eating a carrot and another man eating grass.

Don Quixote (1605, chapter xxi) has the variation: “… experience … the mother of all the sciences” (“experiencias, madre de los ciencias todas”).

== In popular culture ==
- In 1964 Frank Zappa took over leadership of the American rock band The Soul Giants. He renamed the band The Mothers, referring to the jazz compliment of mother for a great musician. However, their record company, Verve Records, objected to the insinuation (i.e., "motherfuckers") and by necessity Zappa had to change the name, creating (and defining) The Mothers of Invention.
- Danish economist Ester Boserup believed "necessity is the mother of invention" and this was a major point in her book The Conditions of Agricultural Growth: The Economics of Agrarian Change under Population Pressure.

== Criticism ==
In an address to the Mathematical Association of England on the importance of education in 1917, Alfred North Whitehead, a philosopher-mathematician, argued that "the basis of invention is science, and science is almost wholly the outgrowth of pleasurable intellectual curiosity," and in contrast to the old proverb "Necessity is the mother of futile dodges" is much nearer to the truth.
