= Muse (surname) =

Muse is a surname. Notable people with the surname include:

- Alexander Muse (born 1972), American businessman
- Arizona Muse (born 1988), American fashion model
- C. Anthony Muse (born 1958), American politician
- Dan Muse (born 1982), American hockey coach
- David Muse (1949–2022) American rock musician, longtime member of the band Firefall
- George and Willie Muse (1893–1971 and 1892–2001), African-American circus performers and the subject of the 2016 book Truevine
- John Muse (born 1988), American ice hockey player
- John Muse (businessman), American businessman
- Katie Cabell Currie Muse (1861–1927), American socialite and clubwoman
- Morley Muse, renewable energy engineer
- Munirudeen Adekunle Muse (born 1939), Nigerian politician
- Nick Muse (born 1998), American football player
- Sunday Muse, Canadian actress and voice actress
- Tanner Muse (born 1996), American football player
- William Muse (born 1939), American university president

== See also ==
- Christopher Muse (Triage), a mutant character in Marvel Comics
- Muse (disambiguation)
- Muser (surname)
