= Gender & Development =

- Discipline: Gender and development
- Language: English
- Edited by: Caroline Sweetman

Publication details
- History: 1993–present
- Publisher: Routledge and Oxfam (United Kingdom)
- Frequency: Triannually

Standard abbreviations
- ISO 4: Gend. Dev.

Indexing
- ISSN: 1355-2074 (print); 1364-9221 (web)
- OCLC no.: 709961253

Links
- Journal homepage; Online access; Online archive; Journal page at publisher's website

Gender & Development is a peer-reviewed journal published triannually by Routledge and Oxfam to provide "promote, inspire, and support development policy and practice." The editor-in-chief is Caroline Sweetman (Oxfam, GB).

== 'Virtual' issue ==
A special 'virtual' issue of the journal on Intersecting Inequalities was created for the International Symposium on Gender and Intersectionality, convened by Oxfam and The Center for Gender in Organizations, Simmons School of Management, Boston Massachusetts (23-24 March 2015).
