= Möser (surname) =

Möser or Moeser is a German name. Notable people with the surname include:

- Duanne Moeser (born 1963), Canadian-German ice hockey player
- Hans Möser (1906–1948), German Nazi SS concentration camp officer executed for war crimes
- James Moeser (born 1939), the ninth chancellor of the University of North Carolina at Chapel Hill
- Justus Möser (1720–1794), German jurist and social theorist
- Ron Moeser (1942–2017), City Councillor in Toronto, Canada

== See also ==
- Moser (disambiguation)
