= StaffPad =

Scorewriter and composition software for iPadOS and Windows 10

- Original authors: David William Hearn; Matthew Tesch
- Developers: Muse Group; StaffPad Ltd
- Release: March 2015; 11 years ago
- Written in: C++, Swift, C#
- Operating system: Microsoft Windows, iPadOS,
- Available in: English
- Type: Scorewriter
- License: Proprietary
- Website: www.staffpad.net

StaffPad is a scorewriter application for creating musical compositions using handwriting recognition and multi-touch input for music notation.

Originally released for Windows 8 on 31 March 2015, StaffPad was subsequently released on iPadOS on 5 February 2020. Designed for composers, orchestrators, arrangers, songwriters, and teachers, StaffPad is used to create compositions, edit notation, and play back a score using samples. It features adaptive toolsets, a pressure-toggled Erase tool, and text recognition for musical notation. It has been a part of Muse Group since 2021.

== StaffPad Reader ==
StaffPad Reader is a companion application for iPadOS and Microsoft Windows 10, designed for near real-time viewing of StaffPad score files. The Reader application communicates with StaffPad over a Wi-Fi network and displays an automatically formatted part for any musical staff contained in the full score. Multiple Reader applications can connect to the same instance of StaffPad, forming a one-to-many relationship between StaffPad and musicians using the Reader. The user is able to make changes to the full score with StaffPad, with the results updated automatically on all connected Readers.

== See also ==
- List of music software
