= Multicultural Urban Secondary English =

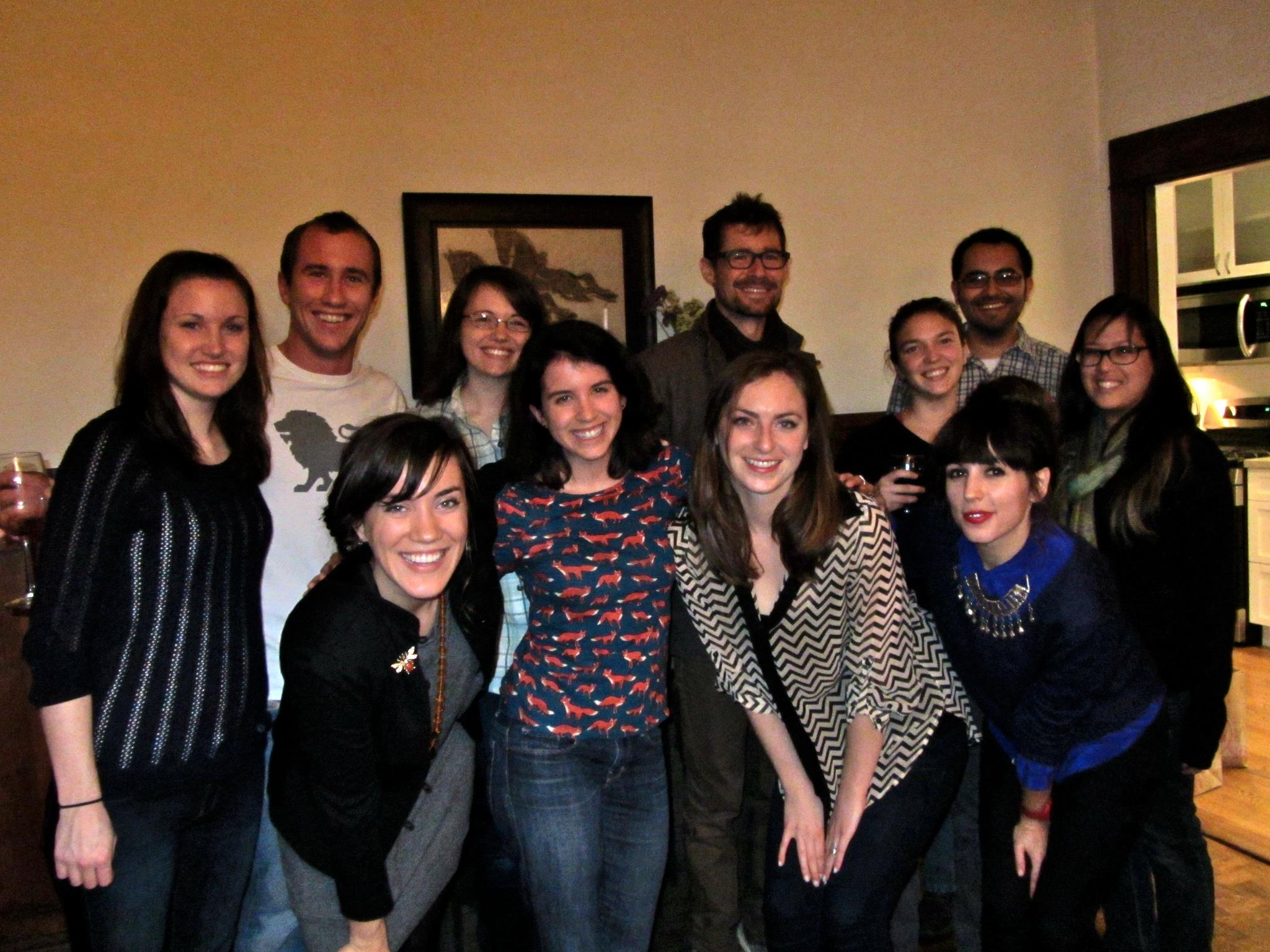
MUSE class of 2014

Multicultural Urban Secondary English (MUSE) was a two-year master's and credential program in the Graduate School of Education at the University of California, Berkeley. Graduates of the MUSE program receive their single subject credential for teaching English in secondary schools as well as a master's degree in education. In their first year, participants complete graduate level coursework concurrent with student teaching. During the second year of the program, MUSE students work full-time in a local middle or high school while completing their master's thesis. The program director was the late Christine Cziko. The program that replaced this program is called the Single Subject- English Pathway.
