= Harvard Analytical Framework =

Framework for gender analysis

The Harvard Analytical Framework, also called the Gender Roles Framework, is one of the earliest frameworks for understanding differences between men and women in their participation in the economy. Framework-based gender analysis has great importance in helping policy makers understand the economic case for allocating development resources to women as well as men.

== History ==
The framework has its origins in 1980 with a request to Harvard University for Women In Development (WID) training from the World Bank. James Austin, who was well known for case-method training at Harvard, led a team with three women experienced in WID work: Catherine Overholt, Mary Anderson and Kathleen Cloud. These became known as the "Harvard Team". The framework was elaborated by the Harvard Institute for International Development in collaboration with the WID office of USAID, and was first described in 1984 by Catherine Overholt and others. It was one of the earliest of such frameworks. The starting point for the framework was the assumption that it makes economic sense for development aid projects to allocate resources to women as well as men, which will make development more efficient – a position named the “efficiency approach".

The Framework for People Oriented Planning in Refugee Situations, more often called the People-Oriented Planning Framework, or POP, is a framework based on the Harvard Framework that tries to overcome some of its initial weaknesses, and is designed for use in emergency situations. POP was developed for the United Nations High Commission for Refugees. Other frameworks include Caroline Moser's Gender Planning Framework, Naila Kabeer's Social Relations Framework and the Womens Empowerment Framework.

== The framework ==
The Harvard Analytical Framework is used to collect information from the community and from households. It describes who does each activity, who has access and control of resources and the influences on gender roles. The Activity Profile answers the question "Who does what?" for all relevant productive and reproductive tasks. The Access and Control Profile identifies the resources used in the tasks identified in the Activity Profile, and defines who has access to these resources and who controls their use. It also identifies the benefits that are realized from each activity, and who has access to and control over these benefits. The final Influencing factors section identifies factors that cause the differences of roles of each gender identified in the two profiles. These may indicate areas where there is opportunity to change gender roles. A project using the framework will have identification, design, implementation and evaluation stages. The framework also provides a series of checklists, questions to be asked at each stage.

A more complete description of the framework is given in A Case Book: Gender Roles in Development Projects edited by Catherine Overholt, Mary B. Anderson, Kathleen Cloud, James E. Austin, published by Kumariyan Press in 1985.

== Strengths and weaknesses ==
Being neutral and fact-oriented, the framework is useful in starting discussion on gender-related issues with people who otherwise resist thinking about the balance of power between men and women. It is also useful in presenting information to people who tend to see decisions in economic terms. The framework applies best to projects addressing agricultural or rural based communities, or that are seeking poverty reduction through implementing a sustainable livelihood.

The Harvard Framework focuses on projects rather than programs, and on efficiency rather than effectiveness. It does not help identify strategic gender needs and gives no guidance on changing gender inequalities. The framework assumes that gender needs should be addressed for the sake of economic efficiency, and gives less importance to the concepts of equity, power relations or decision-making processes. The top-down check-box approach leads to simplification, ignoring the subjects' analysis of their situation and ignoring factors such as race, class, ethnicity and other types of relationships, essential in progressing efficiency itself.
