= Gender analysis =

Gender analysis is a type of socio-economic analysis that uncovers how gender relations affect a development problem. The aim may just be to show that gender relations will probably affect the solution, or to show how they will affect the solution and what could be done. Gender analysis frameworks provide a step-by-step methodology for conducting gender analysis.

== Concepts ==
In many societies, although not in all, women have traditionally been disadvantaged compared to men. Until recently, studies of these societies for the purpose of planning development covered women narrowly in terms of population, health and family planning. Relatively little was known about other concerns such as domestic violence or involvement in economic activities. Gender analysis provides more information, bringing benefits to women and to society as a whole. The Women in Development (WID) approach emerged in the 1970s, calling for treatment of "women's issues" in development projects. Later, the Gender and Development (GAD) approach proposed more emphasis on gender relations rather than seeing women's issues in isolation.

An example of the effect of skipping gender analysis is provided by a project that introduced handcarts to a village for use in collecting firewood. It was thought that the men would use the carts to collect wood, freeing up the women for other activities. In fact, the men collected the wood for sale, keeping the money. As they depleted supplies near the village, the women had to travel further to collect wood.

Gender analysis has commonly been used as a tool for development and emergency relief projects. The socially constructed roles of men and women must be understood in project or program design, as must roles related to class, caste, ethnicity, and age. The techniques are also important in understanding the management of natural resources. Gender analysis is relevant to education, although the frameworks used for development projects must be adapted to meet the needs of educational projects.

== Frameworks ==
=== Harvard Analytical Framework ===
The Harvard Analytical Framework, also called the Gender Roles Framework, was developed by the Harvard Institute for International Development in collaboration with the Women In Development office of USAID, and was first described in 1984 by Catherine Overholt and others. It was one of the earliest examples of such frameworks. The starting point for the framework was the assumption that it makes economic sense for development aid projects to allocate resources to women as well as men, which will make development more efficient – a position named the “efficiency approach".

=== Moser Framework ===
Caroline Moser developed the Moser Framework for gender analysis in the 1980s while working at the Development Planning Unit of the University of London. Working with Caren Levy, she expanded it into a methodology for gender policy and planning. The Moser framework follows the Gender and Development approach in emphasizing the importance of gender relations. As with the WID-based Harvard Framework, it includes a collection of quantitative empirical facts. Going further, it investigates the reasons and processes that lead to conventions of access and control. The Moser Framework includes gender roles identification, gender needs assessment, disaggregating control of resources and decision making within the household, planning for balancing the triple role, distinguishing between different aims in interventions and involving women and gender-aware organizations in planning.

=== Gender Analysis Matrix ===
Rani Parker developed the Gender Analysis Matrix (GAM) in collaboration with other development practitioners to support their grassroots work for a Middle Eastern NGO. Participatory planning is a basic theme of the framework, which is flexible enough to handle situations where data collection is severely handicapped.

=== Capacities and Vulnerabilities Analysis Framework ===
The Capacities and Vulnerabilities Analysis (CVA) was developed in a research project at Harvard University, with some of the authors having also worked on the Harvard Analytic Framework. The CVA is based on an analysis of 30 case studies of NGOs responding to disaster situations, and is designed to help in emergency aid planning to meet immediate needs while considering longer-term development needs.

=== Longwe's Women's Empowerment Framework ===
The Women's Empowerment Framework, or Longwe Framework, was developed by Sara Hlupekile Longwe, a consultant based in Lusaka, Zambia specializing in gender and development issues. The framework helps planners understand the practical meaning of women's empowerment and equality, and then evaluate whether a development initiative supports this empowerment. The basic premise is that women's development can be viewed in terms of five levels of equality: welfare, access, "conscientization", participation and control. Empowerment is essential at each of these levels. Welfare addresses basic needs, and access addresses the ability to use resources such as credit, land and education. "Conscientization" is a key element of the framework: recognition that discrimination creates gender-related problems and that women may themselves contribute to this discrimination. With participation, women are equal to men in making decisions, and with control the balance of powers between the genders is equal.

=== Social Relations Approach ===
The Social Relations Approach applies a socialist feminist philosophy to gender analysis, and has been used by various government department and NGOs as a planning framework. It was developed by Naila Kabeer at Sussex University in the United Kingdom. The approach centers on the interchange between patriarchy and social relations. Unlike the Harvard Framework and the Gender Analysis Matrix, it does not focus on roles, resources and activities, but instead looks at the relations between the State, market, community and family. Relationships between women may be relevant, such as the relationship between a female servant and her mistress. Discussing the players in the process, Naila Kabeer proposes that "planning for women's empowerment is most likely to succeed when the process is seen as the responsibility of those who are planned for; when social action groups and grassroots movements help to counter the top-down logic of the planning process..."

== Sources ==
- Brouwer, Elizabeth C.; Harris, Bruce M.; Tanaka, Sonomi (1998). Gender analysis in Papua New Guinea. World Bank Publications. ISBN 0-8213-4394-7.
- Kabeer, Naila (1994). Reversed realities: gender hierarchies in development thought. Verso. ISBN 0-86091-584-0.
- Leach, Fiona E. (2003). Practising gender analysis in education. Oxfam. ISBN 0-85598-493-7.
- March, Candida; Smyth, Inés A.; Mukhopadhyay, Maitrayee (1999). A guide to gender-analysis frameworks. Oxfam. ISBN 0-85598-403-1.
- Ochola, Washington O.; Sanginga, Pascal C.; Bekalo, Isaac (2010). Managing Natural Resources for Development in Africa. IDRC. ISBN 978-9966-792-09-9.
- Sahay, Sushama (1998). Women and Empowerment: Approaches and Strategies. Discovery Publishing House. ISBN 81-7141-412-5.
- USAID (2008). "Gender Analysis Frameworks" (PDF). Archived from the original (PDF) on 2010-05-13.
- Van Marle, Karin (2006). Sex, gender, becoming: post-apartheid reflections. PULP. ISBN 0-9585097-5-1.
- Vernooy, Ronnie (2006). Social and gender analysis in natural resource management: learning studies and lessons from Asia. SAGE. ISBN 0-7619-3463-4.
