= Feminist constructivism =

International relations theory

Feminist constructivism is an international relations theory which builds upon the theory of constructivism. Feminist constructivism focuses upon the study of how ideas about gender influence global politics. It is the communication between two postcolonial theories; feminism and constructivism, and how they both share similar key ideas in creating gender equality globally.

== Communication between the theories ==
Constructivism is a theory of knowledge which argues that humans generate knowledge and meaning through world interactions and ideas. Constructivists argue that international life is social, resulting from the ways people interact with each other (i.e. talk, follow norms, create rules, etc.). While there are similarities, feminist constructivists view relationships of power differently than traditional constructivists. Power and gender are considered "integral elements in processes of construction," where as traditionalists believe power to be external. Feminist constructivists argue that the lack of problematization research as a social process of construction is logically inconsistent "with an ontology of becoming." They also believe that differences between men and women, other than anatomical differences, were constructed due to socialization and cultural training. However, there are criticisms that take place between interactions of feminism with constructivism. Many feminists do not agree with constructivism as an alternative middle ground due to most constructivists ignoring feminist literature and gender analysis. It's also pointed out that constructivism lacks the tools to explain how gender and power in politics influence each other, due to the social construction of power being under theorized.

Feminist constructivism critiques traditional constructivist approaches for acknowledging the social construction of political realities while often neglecting to integrate gender as a central analytical category. Additionally, constructivist scholarship is frequently criticized for its lack of an explicit political agenda, in contrast to feminist literature, which actively seeks to address and challenge gender-based inequalities.

However, feminist constructivists argue that ideas about gender profoundly shape political outcomes by influencing norms surrounding conflict, humanitarian practices, and institutional policies. By integrating these insights, feminist constructivism broadens both constructivist and feminist frameworks, emphasizing the importance of analyzing how gendered power hierarchies are constructed, sustained, and contested within political systems. This approach provides a critical lens to uncover the deep interconnections between gendered norms, power dynamics, and international relations.

== Influence in politics ==
Major critiques in the feminist presence of global politics have not received as much attention in the media, due to more attention being given to the arguments of environmentalists and labor issues at anti-trade rallies, as opposed to those of feminist ideologies. However, some places were found to be very ambivalent towards anti-globalization, an example being women in India who weren't concerned with the demands that linked trade liberalization with the enforcement of work standards.

== Influence in research ==
Many dilemmas feminists observe is that there is some difficulty in measuring out the impact feminists had on international relations. Feminist theory tends to reveal politics in every aspect of the research process, whether it's absence of action, silence of major concerns, oppression of feminist beliefs, and the power epistemology has on others preconceptions. In order to change this, many researchers utilize feminist research ethic, the commitment to inquire how one inquires. It involves being attentive to the power of knowledge, boundaries, marginalization, and silences, relationships and the power differentials between them, and the researcher's own situatedness. Epistemology plays a significant role, in that the researcher must destabilize themselves from our system of thought that goes into distinguishing fact from belief, which then allows the researcher to be objective in their studies. Another key component in feminist research ethic is boundaries, as in being attentive to them and their power to marginalize. It may include inclusion and exclusion of boundaries, as well as breaking them down. Having a feminist research ethic also requires the researcher to consider are relationships and how social, political, and economical actions are interrelated with other actions and lives.

== Influence in leadership ==
When women or other members of minority groups obtain a position of substantial power in society, they most likely will encounter trouble garnering compliance for the use of their powers. This is primarily caused by the existing belief that gender is an institutionalized system of social practices for constituting males and females as different in socially significant ways and organizing inequalities in terms of those differences. Expectation states theory states that gender is deep-seated within social hierarchy because the rules for gender systems that contain stereotypes are considered status beliefs, cultural schemas about the leadership position that are based on gender, race, ethnicity, education, or occupation.

== See also ==
- Constructivism in international relations
- Feminism in international relations
