= Josef Moser (entomologist) =

Austrian entomologist and priest

Josef Moser (26 March 1861, in Ried im Innkreis – 3 March 1944) was an Austrian priest who gained fame as an enthusiastic entomologist. He studied for the priesthood in Linz, and became a priest in Zell.

Even as a seminarian, Moser joined the Association for Natural History, and in 1901 he joined the Upper Austrian Museum Association. In his spare time, he built up a collection of 35,310 beetles and 13,269 butterflies, "which was the largest of its kind in the country and contained rare specimens from all five parts of the world." After his death, Moser's collection of 250 stores and his extensive specialist library were acquired by the Upper Austrian Provincial Museum.
