= Noteflight =

Online music community

- Release: 2008

Noteflight is an online community for sharing and notating music. As of March 2022, Noteflight consisted of 8.07 million registered users. Registered users may compose and notate music in Noteflight for free, while premium membership is required in order to use other advanced features such as sound recording.

== Instruments ==
Name	Key	Section	Default Clef
Acoustic Guitar*	C	Plucked Strings	Treble
Acoustic Guitar (Tab)*	C	Plucked Strings	Tab
Alto Saxophone	Eb	Woodwind	Treble
Alto Voice*	C	Voice	Treble
Banjo*	C	Plucked Strings	Treble
Baritone/Euphonium*	C	Brass	Bass
Baritone Saxophone*	Eb	Woodwind	Treble
Baritone Voice*	C	Voice	Treble
Bass Clarinet*	Bb	Woodwind	Treble
Bass Guitar*	C	Plucked Strings	Bass
Bass Guitar (Tab)*	C	Plucked Strings	Tab
Bass Voice*	C	Voice	Treble
Bassoon	C	Woodwind	Bass
Bells/Glockenspiel*	C	Keyboards	Treble
Cello	C	Bowed Strings	Bass
Clarinet	Bb	Woodwind	Treble
Classical Guitar	C	Plucked Strings	Treble
Classical Guitar (Tab)	C	Plucked Strings	Tab
Double Bass	C	Bowed Strings	Bass
Drumset	C	Unpitched Percussion	Percussion
Electric Bass	C	Plucked Strings	Treble
Electric Bass	C	Plucked Strings	Tab
English Horn*	F	Woodwind	Treble
Flute	C	Woodwind	Treble
French Horn*	F	Brass	Treble
Grand Piano	C	Keyboard	Treble/Bass
Guitar	C	Plucked Strings	Treble
Guitar (Tab)	C	Plucked Strings	Tab
Harp*	C	Plucked Strings	Treble/Bass
Harpsichord*	C	Keyboard	Treble/Bass
Marimba*	C	Keyboard	Treble
Oboe	C	Woodwind	Treble
Organ*	C	Keyboard	Treble/Bass
Percussion	C	Unpitched Percussion	Percussion
Piano/Keyboard	C	Keyboard	Treble/Bass
Piccolo*	C	Woodwind	Treble
Soprano Saxophone	Bb	Woodwind	Treble
Soprano Voice*	C	Voice	Treble
Tenor (Marching Band)*	C	Keyboard	Percussion
Tenor Saxophone	Bb	Woodwind	Treble
Tenor Voice*	C	Voice	Treble
Timpani*	C	Keyboard	Bass
Trombone	C	Brass	Bass
Trumpet/Cornet	Bb	Brass	Treble
Tuba*	C	Brass	Bass
Ukulele*	C	Plucked Strings	Treble
Ukulele (Tab)*	C	Plucked Strings	Tab
Vibraphone*	C	Keyboard	Treble
Viola	C	Bowed Strings	Alto
Violin	C	Bowed Strings	Treble
Voice*	C	Voice	Treble
Xylophone*	C	Keyboard	Treble

* indicates only available with Noteflight Premium

== See also ==
- MuseScore
- Lilypond
- Music Production
