= Caroline Moser =

British sociologist and anthropologist

Caroline Olivia Nonesi Moser is a British anthropologist and academic. She specialises in urban social anthropology and social policy. She is primarily known for her field-based approach to research on the informal sector generally - but particularly aspects such as poverty, violence, asset vulnerability and strategies for accumulation in the urban setting. Gender analysis is central to her approach. She has looked at many countries, but the Americas have been her main interest. Countries studied closely include Colombia, Ecuador, Guatemala and Jamaica.

She has also researched community participation, looking at the social dimensions of economic reform, the role of human rights, social protection and responses of the urban environment to climate change.

== Education ==
Prof Moser has a Ph.D. from Sussex University, (1975) a postgraduate diploma from Manchester University (1968) and a BA from Durham University (1967).

== Career ==
Her career has included time at University College London (1978–1986); London School of Economics (1986–1990); the World Bank (1990–2000); the Overseas Development Institute (2001–2002); The New School (New York) (2002–2003) Brookings Institution (2004–2007) and the University of Manchester (2007–present). She currently works as a lecturer and research practitioner in the Global Urban Research Centre within the University of Manchester.

Moser developed the Moser Gender Planning Framework, a tool for gender analysis in development planning. The goal is to free women from subordination and allow them to achieve equality, equity and empowerment. The framework defines six tools for systematically analyzing requirements and developing plans.

== Gender and Planning Framework ==
One of Caroline Moser's more notable works is “Gender Planning in the Third World: Meeting Practical and Strategic Gender Needs.” Moser's studies led her to develop a framework in third world countries in terms of gender and planning. The basis of her theory is that men and women simply have different needs from one another, and therefore require different strategies to satisfy those needs. She primarily focused on women in her study, and how to improve frameworks based on the group's specific gender needs. In her paper, she states that when incorporating women into these third world countries’ plans, policy makers need to strategize based on gender – not the fact that they are women. Moser supports the feminist view that singling out women as a group as opposed to looking at genders is not useful in planning. She feels that utilizing a generalized gender concept ignores the social relationships that the genders bear to each other. This feminist concept serves as a basic foundation for her argument that since men and women have their own roles in society, they need to be planned for differently.

In her paper, Moser introduces her idea of “the triple role of women.” The three roles of women in low-income households can be summarized as reproductive and community managing work. She says that reproductive work pertains to being the mother in the household; generally, this refers to taking care of the children. Community managing is that women, as the mother figures of their household, are responsible for gathering and keeping the community in check. However, Moser claims that in this role they accept the structure of society and can do very little to actually maintain their community. In contrast, Moser describes men as productive workers with community leadership roles.

Moser feels that the two genders have quite contrasting roles in society, and in response, policy makers should take each role into consideration. Her main argument is that the roles mentioned for women (productive and community management) are viewed as natural, and therefore neglected in policy making. She believes that men's roles as the “breadwinners” and leaders of society is glorified, while the just-as-important roles of women are forgotten about because they are seen as domestic, natural attributes.

Another issue Moser finds with the Third World society model is that it discredits other types of household structures, and only takes the Nuclear family into consideration. Moser explains the model forgets about households with single women and ones with temporarily absent men figures. Her so-called “women-headed” households are increasing statistically, but Moser says that these women have difficulty accessing the same level of employment and success that their male counterparts achieve. The constraint is thought to be caused by the triple role of women. Moser states that these women must fulfill their roles and do not have the time or access to benefit from program policies and accommodations.

The basis for which Moser proposes a solution is that the system must look at the gender's needs. The categories for needs can be broken down into strategic and practical needs. Strategically, Moser believes that men and women need to have gender equality, while practical needs refer to what is relevant to women. Moser more specifically discusses needs regarding employment, human settlements and housing, and basic services. She feels that employment can be altered by teaching women jobs that are traditionally held by men. In her opinion, by introducing women into labor fields that typically men are a part of, it will open up opportunities to make a living and potentially erode at the existing divide of the sexes in the work force. Her framework continues to suggest the need to legalize household enterprises so that women that are tied to their homes can also earn money. Lastly, Moser argues that it is necessary for public transportation that can only be accessed by women. Moser's point of a female transport system is that it will allow women to feel safe when taking care of their needs and errands outside of the house.

== Violence Framework ==
Moser also spent time studying in Latin America, where she wrote her paper “Latin American Urban Violence as a Development Concern: Towards a Framework for Violence Reduction.” As the title sounds, the paper pushes for a framework to improve the impoverished areas while taking violence into great consideration. She believes that it is crucial to understand and identify the driving forces of all the violence in these urban areas, and come up with a solution to diminish it. Moser promotes a cross-sectoral violence-reduction framework. This framework is important to anthropology because it takes all perspectives into consideration, including first-hand experience and statistics. She mentions that the reason she chose Latin America to develop this framework and study is because the nation has the highest rates of violence recorded. The framework highlights that there is a link between mainly inequality and impoverished communities, mixed in with a number of other factors including violence. Overall, the acts of violence in Latin American communities are contributing to a heightened number of homicides and deaths that the country has never seen before. As opposed to her framework on gender and planning, which primarily focuses on the needs of women, Moser's violence framework is intended to reinforce safety for both genders in impoverished regions.

In the paper, violence in distinguished into four main categories: political, institutional, economic, and social. She argues that in separating each form of violence into its own category, then it will become easier for policy makes to identify causes and form solutions. Different countries may have overlapping causes of violence, in which those developing policies can potentially be reused in numerous regions. Her paper introduces what she calls “roadmaps,” which essentially list the categories of violence, the kind of violence, and traces back to what may be the underlying cause.

== Contributions ==
Moser's influence is widespread in articles discussing societal developments that will promote equality. Anthropologists have utilized her framework from “Gender Planning in the Third World: Meeting Practical and Strategic Gender Needs” as the driving force for their papers. For example, anthropologists Fenella Porter and Caroline Sweetman were motivated by Moser and explained how to use gender mainstreaming to raise awareness. They added onto her framework by suggesting education about the domestic/forgotten roles of women, in contrast to their expected roles. Similar to Moser, the article highlights the importance of identifying the various roles of both genders, and how it relates to their economic status.

Since Moser is a known feminist, there is a common misconception that she only addresses women in her work. However, some of her frameworks include benefiting both genders. Her gender and planning framework specifically examines the roles of women and how to develop policies that can cater to their needs. On the other hand, her violence framework does not only concern women, but includes men. The violence framework is aimed to protect both genders from the effects of inequality that result in brutality. The only part of her violence framework that separates the two genders is her call for changes in social violence. The other forms of violence are experienced by both genders, but social violence in particular most often portrays men as the violator and woman as the victim. Moser shows great interest in equality for society as a whole.

== Works ==
- Moser, C. (1993) Gender Planning and Development: Theory, Practice and Training, New York and London, Routledge.
