= Steve Lawrence (disambiguation) =

Steve Lawrence (1935–2024) was an American actor and singer whose career started in the 1950s.

Steve Lawrence may also refer to:

- Steve Lawrence (computer scientist), Australian computer scientist who works mainly on internet search engines
- Steve Lawrence, bassist with bands including the Phantom Chords
- Steve Lawrence (cyclist) (born 1955), British racing cyclist
- Steve Lawrence (rugby union), Welsh international rugby union player

== See also ==
- Steven Lawrence (born 1976), Australian footballer
- Stephen Laurence, scientist and philosopher
- Stephen Lawrence (disambiguation)
