= NEC Laboratories America =

North American center for research by NEC, based in Princeton, New Jersey

NEC Laboratories America, Inc. (NEC Labs America), formerly known as NEC Research Institute (1988 – 2002), is the US-based center for NEC Corporation’s global network of corporate research laboratories. It was established in 1988 with the primary location in Princeton, New Jersey and subsequently, a second location in the San Francisco Bay Area, specifically San Jose, California. The lab is a subsidiary of the NEC Corporation of America, headquartered in Irving, Texas.

== History ==
NEC Labs America was created through the merger of the NEC Research Institute (NECI) and the NEC C&C Research Laboratories (CCRL). NECI was founded in 1988 to conduct long-term basic research in sciences underlying the computer and communications (C&C) technologies of the future. Its founding board was composed of thought leaders in computing and physical sciences, including Joseph Giordmaine, C. William Gear, Stuart Solin, Peter Wolff, Robert Tarjan and Leslie Valiant, with the goal of making important contributions to the basic research community and applying their results to improve the quality of human life. CCRL was established in Oct 1991 under the leadership of Kojiro Watanabe and its Silicon Valley Office, headed by Yoshinori Hara, was established in Aug 1995. NECI and CCRL merged in 2002.

Initial research areas in the physical sciences included device physics, materials science, optical and quantum electronics, circuits and implementations of neural, optical, and other novel computer architectures. Research areas in computer science included parallel computing, software, artificial intelligence and cognitive science. During the past two decades, its focus has adapted in favor of computer science disciplines.

== Research Areas ==
Research emphasis at NEC Labs America has evolved over time and in the current era, reflects a focus on artificial intelligence and its potential applications. Current research areas at NEC Labs America include the following:

- Data Science and System Security
- Integrated Systems
- Machine Learning
- Media Analytics
- Optical Networking and Sensing

== Key People ==
=== Presidents ===
The current president of NEC Labs America is Christopher White, who assumed the position in March 2020. The founding president of NEC Research Institute was Dawon Kahng, who served from the inception of the organization until his death in May 1992 and was succeeded by C. William Gear (1992 – 2000) and David Waltz (2000 – 2002). Previous presidents of NEC Labs America in its current form include Robert Millstein (2002 – 2005), Roger Tran (2005 – 2017) and Akihiro Uchida (2017 – 2020).

=== Fellows ===
- Robert Tarjan: A computer scientist and expert on graph algorithms, winner of the 1986 ACM Turing Award, currently distinguished professor at Princeton University and chief scientist at Intertrust Technologies.
- Leslie Valiant: A theoretical computer scientist, winner of the 1986 Nevanlinna Prize, the 1997 Knuth Prize and the 2010 ACM Turing Award, currently professor of computer science and applied mathematics at Harvard University.
- Peter Wolff: A pioneer in semiconductor research, who subsequently led the industry forum at the physics department of MIT.
- C. William Gear: An expert in numerical analysis, who was previously the head of the computer science department at the University of Illinois, Urbana-Champaign and led NECI during 1992- 2000.
- David Waltz: The first VP of Computer Sciences, who was an expert in computer vision and AI, subsequently joining Columbia University where he was the director of Center for Computational Learning Systems.
- Boris Altshuler: A leading researcher in condensed matter physics, who is currently a professor of theoretical physics at Columbia University, a member of the National Academy of Sciences and a Dirac Medal winner.
- Ingemar Cox: Founder of the computer vision group who pioneered techniques in digital watermarking and commercialized them as CTO of the NEC spin-off Signify, currently a professor of computer science at University College London.

== Major Achievements ==
- CiteSeer: A digital library and search engine that indexes citations for scientific articles, allows ranking them by citation impact and supports queries by document attributes and citation details. It was created in 1997 by NEC Labs America researchers Lee Giles, Kurt Bollacker and Steve Lawrence.
- Fiber optic communication and sensing world records: NEC Labs America has established various world records in fiber optic communication and sensing. In 2011, a research team led by Dayou Qian and Ting Wang at NEC Labs America demonstrated the transmission of data at 101 Tbit/s through a single fiber optic core, which at the time was the world record for single fiber optic core data bandwidth. In 2013, NEC Labs America and Corning Inc. demonstrated the transmission of data at 1.05 Pbit/s over a multi-core fiber optic, which at the time was a record for single fiber optic bandwidth. In 2019, NEC Labs America teamed with Verizon to demonstrated the ability to use fiber optic communication and sensing over existing fiber optic telecommunication infrastructure.
- Torch: A machine learning library based on the Lua programming language that found widespread usage in deep learning. Created by NEC Labs America researcher Ronan Collobert and colleagues, it saw active development until 2018 and formed the basis for the popular PyTorch library.
- ePathologist: Machine learning system developed at NEC Labs America to detect tissue and cell features within these images in order to identify regions of interest and make quantitative measurements of structures, to assist pathologists in making decisions relating to the clinical treatment of cancer in individual patients. In 2011, NEC and Royal Philips Electronics signed an agreement to jointly develop and market the technology.
