= Lee Giles =

American computer scientist

Clyde Lee Giles
- Born: Memphis, Tennessee
- Education: Rhodes College; University of Tennessee; University of Michigan; University of Arizona
- Known for: CiteSeer, neural networks, information retrieval, digital libraries, web search
- Awards: ACM Fellow; IEEE Fellow; INNS Fellow; IBM Distinguished Faculty Award; INNS Gabor Award; IEEE Computational Intelligence Society (CIS) Neural Networks Pioneer Award; National Federation of Advanced Information Services (NFAIS) Miles Conrad Award; Eagle Scout
- Scientific career
- Fields: Computer science, search engines, artificial intelligence, deep learning
- Workplaces: Ford Motor Company, Naval Research Laboratory, Air Force Office of Scientific Research, NEC Research Institute, Pennsylvania State University
- Doctoral advisor: Harrison Hooker Barrett

Clyde Lee Giles is an American computer scientist and is the Emeritus David Reese Professor at the Penn State College of Information Sciences and Technology (IST) at the Pennsylvania State University where he taught for 24 years. He was also Graduate Faculty Professor of Computer Science and Engineering, Courtesy Professor of Supply Chain and Information Systems, and Director of the Intelligent Systems Research Laboratory. He was Interim Associate Dean of Research in the College of IST. He is now emeritus faculty. He graduated from Oakhaven High School in Memphis, Tennessee. His graduate degrees are from the University of Michigan and the University of Arizona and his undergraduate degrees are from Rhodes College and the University of Tennessee. His PhD is in optical sciences with advisor Harrison H. Barrett. His academic genealogy includes two Nobel laureates (Felix Bloch and Werner Heisenberg), Arnold Sommerfeld and prominent mathematicians.

== Research/Career ==
Giles has been associated with the computer science or electrical engineering departments at Princeton University, the University of Pennsylvania, Columbia University, the University of Pisa, the University of Trento and the University of Maryland, College Park. Previous positions were at NEC Research Institute (now NEC Labs), Princeton, NJ; Air Force Research Laboratory; and the United States Naval Research Laboratory. He is best known for his work on the creation of novel scientific and academic search engines and digital libraries and is considered by some one of the founders of academic document search. Earlier research was concerned with recurrent neural networks and optical computing.

His research interests are in intelligent web and cyberinfrastructure tools, search engines and information retrieval, digital libraries, web services, knowledge and information management and extraction, machine learning, and information and data mining. He has created several vertical search engines in these areas. He has over 500 publications with some in Nature, Science and the Proceedings of the National Academy of Sciences. His research is well cited with an h-index of 121 according to Google Scholar and over 60,000 total citations as evidenced in Google Scholar. He has one of the top 200 h-indexes in Computer Science and the top 10 in Information Retrieval. At Penn State he has graduated 40 PHD students. Most of his papers author his name as C. Lee Giles or C.L. Giles.

Most of his classes were graduate courses on deep learning and graduate/upperclassman courses on search engines and information retrieval.

== Awards ==
He is a Fellow of the Association for Computing Machinery (ACM), Institute of Electrical and Electronics Engineers (IEEE), and International Neural Network Society (INNS). He also received the Gabor Award from the International Neural Network Society (INNS) recognizing achievements in engineering/applications in neural networks. Most recently he received the 2018 Institute of Electrical and Electronics Engineers (IEEE) Computational Intelligence Society (CIS) Neural Networks Pioneer Award and the 2018 National Federation of Advanced Information Services (NFAIS) Miles Conrad Award.

He has twice received the IBM Distinguished Faculty Award.

Recently, he was recognized as one of the 100 worldwide academic leaders in data by CDO, the Chief Data Officer Magazine.

== Electromagnetics ==
Before his work on neural networks, Giles published papers on reflection and scattering of electromagnetic waves from magnetic materials for the particular cases of equal refractive indexes. His work is mentioned in the following articles: Goos-Hanchen Effect, Fresnel equations, Mie scattering, and Brewster's angle. For Mie scattering, he is a coauthor on the Kerker effect, which was an extension of his work on a planar boundary effect and his idea.

== Neural networks ==
Giles' work on neural networks showed that fundamental computational structures such as regular grammars and finite state machines could be theoretically represented in recurrent neural networks. Another contribution was the Neural Network Pushdown Automata and the first analog differentiable stack. Some of these publications are cited as early work in "deep" learning.

While at AFOSR in Washington DC, Giles in 1986 established the first neural network funding in 20 years and helped DARPA establish theirs.

== CiteSeer and search engines ==
In 1998 and 1999 his work published in Science and Nature with Steve Lawrence estimated the size of the web and showed that search engines did not index that much of it. This work also showed that the web had significantly matured and had a diversity of material and resources.

With Steve Lawrence and Kurt Bollacker, Giles was responsible for the creation in 1997 of automatic citation indexing and CiteSeer, a public academic search engine and digital library for Computer and Information Science. Under his direction CiteSeer was moved to and is being maintained at the Pennsylvania State University. CiteSeer has been replaced by the Next Generation CiteSeer, CiteSeerX.

He is the director of the Next Generation CiteSeer project, CiteSeerX, also at the Pennsylvania State University. In addition, he was responsible for the creation of an academic business search engine and digital library, BizSeer (previously known as SmealSearch). With Isaac Councill, he created automatic acknowledgement indexing, permitting for the first time the automatic search and indexing of acknowledged entities in scholarly and research documents. The search engine for this was AckSeer. He also was the cocreator of the first search engine for robots.txt, BotSeer.

Research in collaboration with Professors Prasenjit Mitra, Karl Mueller, Barbara Garrison and James Kubicki resulted in the development of a search engine and data portal for chemistry, Chem_{x}Seer, ChemXSeer. With Yang Sun, a novel search engine, BotSeer, was designed that searches and indexes robots.txt files on web sites. The Next Generation CiteSeer, CiteSeer^{x}, came online in February 2008, with over one million articles indexed and now with active crawling exceeds 10 million articles. RefSeerX was a context-aware citation recommendation service which recommended papers from CiteSeerX that are most relevant to a given text. These services were based on SeerSuite, a package of open sources tools for searching and indexing academic documents and data.

== Expert witness ==
Giles has been an expert witness for Quinn Emanuel Urquhart & Sullivan, LLP and Davis Polk & Wardwell, LLP representing Google and Yahoo. He was recently interviewed by Anthropic for an expert witness position.
