= Freebase (dataset) =

Online knowledge base (2007–2016)

- Website type: Online database
- Available in: English
- Successor: Wikidata
- Owner: Metaweb Technologies (Google)
- Website: www.freebase.com
- Commercial: No
- Registration: Optional
- Launched: 3 March 2007; 19 years ago
- Current status: Offline (since 2 May 2016)
- Content license: Creative Commons Attribution License

Freebase was a large collaborative knowledge base consisting of data composed mainly by its community members. It was an online collection of structured data harvested from many sources, including individual, user-submitted wiki contributions. Freebase aimed to create a global resource that allowed people (and machines) to access common information more effectively. It was developed by the American software company Metaweb and run publicly beginning in March 2007. Metaweb was acquired by Google in a private sale announced on 16 July 2010. Google's Knowledge Graph is powered in part by Freebase.

During its existence, Freebase data was available for commercial and non-commercial use under a Creative Commons Attribution License, and an open API, RDF endpoint, and a database dump were provided for programmers.

On 16 December 2014, Google announced that it would shut down Freebase over the succeeding six months and help with the move of the data from Freebase to Wikidata.

On 16 December 2015, Google officially announced the Knowledge Graph API, which is meant to be a replacement to the Freebase API. Freebase.com was officially shut down on 2 May 2016.

Both Graphd and MQL, the graph database and JSON-based query language developed by Metaweb for Freebase, are open-sourced by Google under the Apache 2.0 license, and are available on GitHub. Graphd was open-sourced on 8 September 2018. MQL was open-sourced on 4 August 2020.

== Overview ==
On 3 March 2007 Metaweb announced Freebase, describing it as "an open shared database of the world's knowledge", and "a massive, collaboratively edited database of cross-linked data". Often understood as a database model using Wikipedia-turned-database or entity-relationship model, Freebase provided an interface that allowed non-programmers to fill in structured data, or metadata, of general information and to categorize or connect data items in meaningful, semantic ways.

Described by Tim O'Reilly upon the launch, "Freebase is the bridge between the bottom up vision of Web 2.0 collective intelligence and the more structured world of the semantic web".

Freebase contained data harvested from sources such as Wikipedia, NNDB, Fashion Model Directory and MusicBrainz, as well as data contributed by its users. The structured data was licensed under the Creative Commons Attribution License, and a JSON-based HTTP API is provided to programmers for developing applications on any platform to utilize the Freebase data. The source code for the Metaweb application itself is proprietary.

Freebase ran on a database infrastructure created in-house by Metaweb that use a graph model: Instead of using tables and keys to define data structures, Freebase defined its data structure as a set of nodes and a set of links that established relationships between the nodes. Because its data structure was non-hierarchical, Freebase could model much more complex relationships between individual elements than a conventional database, and was open for users to enter new objects and relationships into the underlying graph. Queries to the database are made in Metaweb Query Language (MQL) and served by a triplestore called graphd.

== Development ==
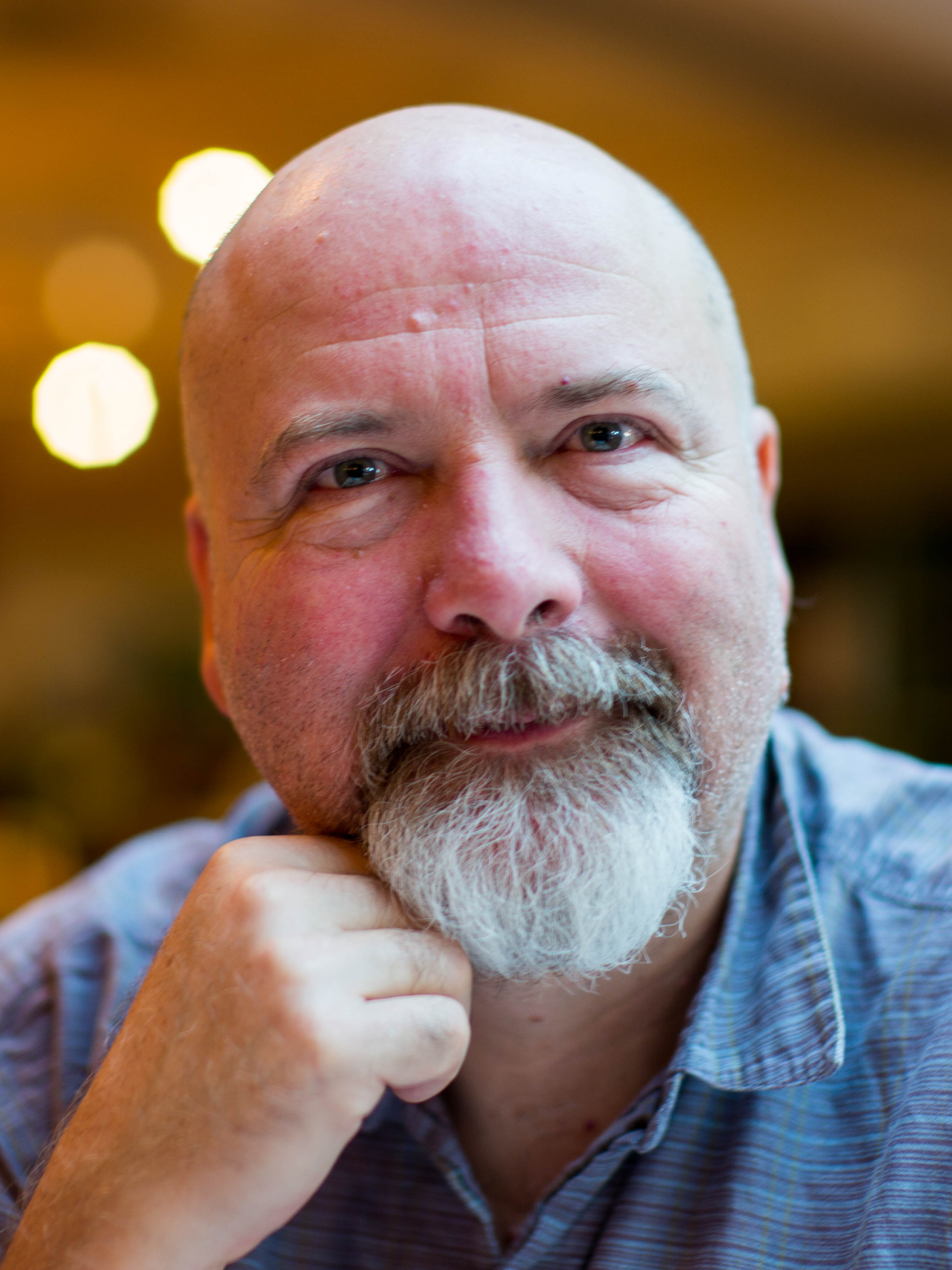
Danny Hillis

Danny Hillis first described his idea for creating a knowledge web he called Aristotle in a paper in 2000, but he said he did not try to build the system until he had recruited technical experts. Veda Hlubinka-Cook, an expert in parallel computing, became Metaweb's Executive Vice President for Product. Kurt Bollacker brought deep expertise in distributed systems, database design, and information retrieval to his role as Chief Scientist at Metaweb. John Giannandrea, formerly Chief Technologist at Tellme Networks and Chief Technologist of the Web browser group at Netscape/AOL, was Chief Technology Officer.

Originally accessible by invitation only, Freebase opened full anonymous read access to the public in its alpha stage of development and later required registration only for data contributions.

On 29 October 2008, at the International Semantic Web Conference, Freebase released its RDF service for generating RDF representations of Freebase topics, allowing Freebase to be used as linked data.

== Organization and policy ==
Freebase's subjects are called "topics", and the data stored about them depended on their "type", as to how they were classified. For example, an entry for Arnold Schwarzenegger, the former governor of California, would be entered as a topic that would include a variety of types describing him as an actor, bodybuilder, and politician. As of January 2014, Freebase had approximately 44 million topics and 2.4 billion facts.

Freebase's types are themselves user-editable. Each type had a number of defined predicates, called "properties".

[U]nlike the W3C approach to the semantic web, which starts with controlled ontologies, Metaweb adopts a folksonomy approach, in which people can add new categories (much like tags), in a messy sprawl of potentially overlapping assertions.

However, Freebase differed from the wiki model in many ways. User-created types were not adopted in the "public commons" until promoted by a Metaweb employee. Also, users could not modify each other's types. The reason Freebase could not open up permissions of schemas is that external applications relied on them; thus, changing a type's schema – for instance by deleting a property or changing a simple property – might have broken queries for API users and even within Freebase itself, for example in saved views.

== Discontinuation ==
On 16 December 2014, the Freebase team officially announced that the website and the API would be shut down by 30 June 2015. Google provided an update on 16 December 2015 that they would discontinue the Freebase API and widget three months after a Suggest widget replacement was launched in early 2016.

== See also ==
- BabelNet
- Cyc
- DBpedia
- Entity–relationship model
- True Knowledge
- YAGO
- Knowledge Vault
- Wikidata
