= Stephen Lawrence (disambiguation) =

Stephen Lawrence (1974–1993) was a black British victim of a racially motivated attack in London.

Stephen or Steven Lawrence may also refer to:

- Stephen Lawrence (footballer) (born 1969), Hawthorn footballer
- Stephen J. Lawrence, (1939–2021) American composer
- Steven Anthony Lawrence (born 1990), American child actor
- Steven Lawrence (born 1976), Australian footballer
- Stephen Lawrence (politician) (born c. 1975), Australian barrister and politician

== See also ==
- Steve Lawrence (disambiguation)
- Stephen Laurence, scientist and philosopher
