= Perceptrons (book) =

Book by Marvin Minsky and Seymour Papert

Perceptrons: An Introduction to Computational Geometry
- Author: Marvin Minsky, Seymour Papert
- Publication date: 1969
- ISBN: 0 262 13043 2

Perceptrons: An Introduction to Computational Geometry is a book written by Marvin Minsky and Seymour Papert and published in 1969. An edition with handwritten corrections and additions was released in the early 1970s. An expanded edition was further published in 1988 (ISBN 9780262631112) after the revival of neural networks, containing a chapter dedicated to countering the criticisms made of it in the 1980s.

The main subject of the book is the perceptron, a type of artificial neural network developed in the late 1950s and early 1960s. The book was dedicated to psychologist Frank Rosenblatt, who in 1957 had published the first model of a "Perceptron". Rosenblatt and Minsky knew each other since adolescence, having studied with a one-year difference at the Bronx High School of Science. They became at one point central figures of a debate inside the AI research community, and are known to have promoted loud discussions in conferences, yet remained friendly.

This book is the center of a long-standing controversy in the study of artificial intelligence. It is claimed that pessimistic predictions made by the authors were responsible for a change in the direction of research in AI, concentrating efforts on so-called "symbolic" systems, a line of research that petered out and contributed to the so-called AI winter of the 1980s, when AI's promise was not realized.

The crux of Perceptrons is a number of mathematical proofs which acknowledge some of the perceptrons' strengths while also showing major limitations. The most important one is related to the computation of some predicates, such as the XOR function, and also the important connectedness predicate. The problem of connectedness is illustrated at the awkwardly colored cover of the book, intended to show how humans themselves have difficulties in computing this predicate. One reviewer, Earl Hunt, noted that the XOR function is difficult for humans to acquire as well during concept learning experiments.

== Publication history ==
When Papert arrived at MIT in 1963, Minsky and Papert decided to write a theoretical account of the limitations of perceptrons. It took until 1969 for them to finish solving the mathematical problems that unexpectedly turned up as they wrote. The first edition was printed in 1969. Handwritten alterations were made by the authors for the second printing in 1972. The handwritten notes include some references to the reviews of the first edition.

An "expanded edition" was published in 1988, which adds a prologue and an epilogue to discuss the revival of neural networks in the 1980s, but no new scientific results. In 2017, the expanded edition was reprinted, with a foreword by Léon Bottou that discusses the book from the perspective of someone working in deep learning.

== Background ==
The perceptron is a neural net developed by psychologist Frank Rosenblatt in 1958 and is one of the most famous machines of its period. In 1960, Rosenblatt and colleagues were able to show that the perceptron could in finitely many training cycles learn any task that its parameters could embody. The perceptron convergence theorem was proved for single-layer neural nets.

During this period, neural net research was a major approach to the brain-machine issue that had been taken by a significant number of persons. Reports by the New York Times and statements by Rosenblatt claimed that neural nets would soon be able to see images, beat humans at chess, and reproduce. At the same time, other new approaches including symbolic AI emerged. Different groups found themselves competing for funding and people, and their demand for computing power far outpaced the available supply.

== Contents ==
Perceptrons: An Introduction to Computational Geometry is a book of thirteen chapters grouped into three sections. Chapters 1–10 present the authors' perceptron theory through proofs, Chapter 11 involves learning, Chapter 12 treats linear separation problems, and Chapter 13 discusses some of the authors' thoughts on simple and multilayer perceptrons and pattern recognition.

=== Definition of perceptron ===
Minsky and Papert took as their subject the abstract versions of a class of learning devices which they called perceptrons, "in recognition of the pioneer work of Frank Rosenblatt". These perceptrons were modified forms of the perceptrons introduced by Rosenblatt in 1958. They consisted of a retina, a single layer of input functions and a single output.

Besides this, the authors restricted the "order", or maximum number of incoming connections, of their perceptrons. Sociologist Mikel Olazaran explains that Minsky and Papert "maintained that the interest of neural computing came from the fact that it was a parallel combination of local information", which, in order to be effective, had to be a simple computation. To the authors, this implied that "each association unit could receive connections only from a small part of the input area". Minsky and Papert called this concept "conjunctive localness".

=== Parity and connectedness ===
Two main examples analyzed by the authors were parity and connectedness. Parity involves determining whether the number of activated inputs in the input retina is odd or even, and connectedness refers to the figure-ground problem. Minsky and Papert proved that the single-layer perceptron could not compute parity under the condition of conjunctive localness (Theorem 3.1.1), and showed that the order required for a perceptron to compute connectivity grew with the input size (Theorem 5.5).

=== The XOR affair ===
Some critics of the book state that the authors imply that, since a single artificial neuron is incapable of implementing some functions such as the XOR logical function, larger networks also have similar limitations, and therefore should be dropped. Research on three-layered perceptrons showed how to implement such functions. Rosenblatt in his book proved that the "elementary perceptron" with an a priori unlimited number of hidden layer A-elements (neurons) and one output neuron can solve any classification problem. (Existence theorem.) Minsky and Papert used perceptrons with restricted numbers of inputs of the hidden layer A-elements and a locality condition: each element of the hidden layer receives the input signals from a small circle. These restricted perceptrons cannot define whether the image is a connected figure or is the number of pixels in the image even (the parity predicate).

There are many mistakes in this story. Although a single neuron can in fact compute only a small number of logical predicates, it was widely known that networks of such elements can compute any possible Boolean function. This was known by Warren McCulloch and Walter Pitts, who even proposed how to create a Turing machine with their formal neurons (Section III of), is mentioned in Rosenblatt's book, mentioned in a typical paper in 1961 (Figure 15), and is even mentioned in the book Perceptrons. Minsky also extensively uses formal neurons to create simple theoretical computers in Chapter 3 of his book Computation: Finite and Infinite Machines.

In the 1960s, a special case of the perceptron network is studied as "linear threshold logic", for applications in digital logic circuits. The classical theory is summarized in according to Donald Knuth. In this special case, perceptron learning was called "Single-Threshold-Element Synthesis by Iteration", and constructing a perceptron network was "Network Synthesis". Other names included linearly separable logic, linear-input logic, threshold logic, majority logic, and voting logic. Hardware for realizing linear threshold logic included magnetic core, resistor-transistor, parametron, resistor-tunnel diode, and multiple coil relay. There were also theoretical studies on the upper and lower bounds on the minimum number of perceptron units necessary to realize any Boolean function.

What the book does prove is that in three-layered feed-forward perceptrons (with a so-called "hidden" or "intermediary" layer), it is not possible to compute some predicates unless at least one of the neurons in the first layer of neurons (the "intermediary" layer) is connected with a non-null weight to each and every input (Theorem 3.1.1, reproduced below). This was contrary to a hope held by some researchers in relying mostly on networks with a few layers of "local" neurons, each one connected only to a small number of inputs. A feed-forward machine with "local" neurons is much easier to build and use than a larger, fully connected neural network, so researchers at the time concentrated on these instead of on more complicated models.

Some other critics, notably Jordan Pollack, note that what was a small proof concerning a global issue (parity) not being detectable by local detectors was interpreted by the community as a rather successful attempt to bury the whole idea.

=== Critique of perceptrons and their extensions ===
In the prologue and the epilogue, added to the 1988 edition, the authors react to the 1980s revival of neural networks by discussing multilayer neural nets and Gamba perceptrons. By "Gamba perceptrons", they meant two-layered perceptron machines where the first layer is also made of perceptron units ("Gamba-masks"). In contrast, most of the book discusses two-layered perceptrons where the first layer is made of boolean units. They conjecture that Gamba machines would require "an enormous number" of Gamba-masks and that multilayer neural nets are a "sterile" extension. Additionally, they note that many of the "impossible" problems for perceptrons had already been solved using other methods.

The Gamba perceptron machine was similar to the perceptron machine of Rosenblatt. Its input was an image. The image is passed through binary masks (randomly generated) in parallel. Behind each mask is a photoreceiver that fires if the input, after masking, is bright enough. The second layer is made of standard perceptron units.

They claimed that perceptron research waned in the 1970s not because of their book, but because of inherent problems: no perceptron learning machines could perform credit assignment any better than Rosenblatt's perceptron learning rule, and perceptrons cannot represent the knowledge required for solving certain problems.

In the final chapter, they claimed that for the 1980s neural networks, "little of significance [has] changed since 1969". They predicted that any single, homogeneous machine must fail to scale up. Neural networks trained by gradient descent would fail to scale up, due to local minima, extremely large weights, and slow convergence. General learning algorithms for neural networks must all be impractical, because a general, domain-independent theory of "how neural networks work" does not exist. Only a society of mind can work. Specifically, they thought there are many different kinds of little problems in the world, each is on the scale of a "toy problem". Large problems are always decomposable into little problems. Each requires a different algorithm to solve, some being perceptrons, others being logical programs, and so on. Any homogeneous machine must fail to solve all but a small number of the little problems. Human intelligence consists of nothing but a collection of many little different algorithms organized like a society.

== Mathematical content ==
=== Preliminary definitions ===
Let $R$ be a finite set. A predicate on $R$ is a boolean function that takes in a subset of $R$ and outputs either $0$ or $1$. In particular, a perceptron unit is a predicate.

A predicate $\psi$ has support $S \subset R$, iff any $X \subset R$, we have $\psi(X) = \psi(X \cap S)$. In words, it means that if we know how $\psi$ works on subsets of $S$, then we know how it works on subsets of all of $R$.

A predicate can have many different supports. The support size of a predicate $\psi$ is the minimal number of elements necessary in its support. For example, the constant-0 and constant-1 functions both are supported on the empty set, thus they both have support size 0.

A perceptron (the kind studied by Minsky and Papert) over $R$ is a function of form
$$\theta\left(\sum_i a_i \psi_i\right)$$
where $\psi_i$ are predicates, and $a_i$ are real numbers.

If $\Phi$ is a set of predicates, then $L(\Phi)$ is the set of all perceptrons using just predicates in $\Phi$.

The order of a perceptron $\theta\left(\sum_i a_i \psi_i\right)$ is the maximal support size of its component predicates $\{\psi_i\}_i$.

The order of a boolean function on $R$ is the minimal order possible for a perceptron implementing the boolean function.

A boolean function is conjunctively local iff its order does not increase to infinity as $|R|$ increases to infinity.

The mask of $A \subset R$ is the predicate $1_A$ defined by
$$1_A(X) = \begin{cases}
1 & \text{ if }A \subset X,\\
0 & \text{ else.}
\end{cases}$$

=== Main theorems ===
Theorem 1.5.1, Positive Normal Form—If a perceptron is of order $k$, then it is of order $k$ using only masks.

Proof

Let the perceptron be $\theta\left(\sum_i a_i \psi_i\right)$, where each $\psi_i$ is of support size at most $k$. We convert it into a linear sum of masks, each having size at most $k$.

Let $\psi_i$ be supported on set $A$. Write it in disjunctive normal form, with one clause for each subset of $A$ on which $\psi_i$ returns $1$, and for each subset, write one positive literal for each element in the subset, and one negative literal otherwise.

For example, suppose $\psi_i$ is supported on $\{1,2\}$, and is $1$ on all odd-sized subsets, then we can write it as
$$(x_1 \land \neg x_2) \lor (\neg x_1 \land  x_2)$$

Now, convert this formula to a Boolean algebra formula, then expand, yielding a linear sum of masks. For example, the above formula is converted to
$$x_1(1-x_2) + (1-x_1)x_2 = x_1 + x_2 - 2x_1x_2$$

Repeat this for each predicate used in the perceptron, and sum them up, we obtain an equivalent perceptron using just masks.

Let $S_R$ be the permutation group on the elements of $R$, and $G$ be a subgroup of $S_R$.

We say that a predicate $\psi$ is $G$ -invariant iff $\psi \circ g = \psi$ for any $g \in G$. That is, any $X\subset R$, we have $\psi(X) = \psi(g(X))$.

For example, the parity function is $S_R$ -invariant, since any permutation of the set preserves the size, and thus parity, of any of its subsets.

Theorem 2.3, group invariance theorem—If $\Phi$ is closed under action by $G$, and $\psi\in L(\Phi)$ is $G$ -invariant, there exists a perceptron
$$\theta\left(\sum_i a_i \psi_i\right) = \psi$$
such that if $\psi_i = \psi_j \circ g$ for some $g\in G$, then $a_i = a_j$.

Proof

The proof idea is to take the average over all elements of $G$.

Enumerate the predicates in $\Phi$ as $\psi_1, \psi_2, ...$, and write $g(j)$ for the index of the predicate such that $\psi_{g(j)} = \psi_j \circ g$, for any $g\in G$. That is, we have defined a group action on the set $\Phi$.

Define $a_j := \sum_{g\in G}b_{g^{-1}(j)}$. We claim this is the desired perceptron.

Since $\psi \in L(\Phi)$, there exists some real numbers $b_j$ such that
$$\theta\left(\sum_j b_j \psi_j\right) = \psi$$

By definition of $G$ -invariance, if $\psi(A) = 1$, then $\psi(g(A)) = 1$ for all $g\in G$. That is,
$$\sum_j b_j (\psi_j\circ g)(A) > 0; \quad g \in G$$
and so, taking the average over all elements in $G$, we have
$$0 < \sum_{g\in G}\sum_j b_j (\psi_j\circ g)(A) = \sum_{g\in G}\sum_j b_{g^{-1}(j)} \psi_j (A) =\sum_j \left(\sum_{g\in G}b_{g^{-1}(j)}\right) \psi_j (A)= \sum_j a_j \psi_j(A)$$

Similarly for the case where $\psi(A) = 0$.

Theorem 3.1.1—The parity function has order $|R|$.

Proof

Let $\psi_{parity}$ be the parity function, and $\Phi$ be the set of all masks of size $\leq |R| -1$. Clearly both $\psi_{parity}$ and $\Phi$ are invariant under all permutations.

Suppose $\psi_{parity}$ has order $\leq |R|-1$, then by the positive normal form theorem, $\psi_{parity} \in L(\Phi)$.

By the group invariance theorem, there exists a perceptron
$$\theta\left(\sum_i a_i \psi_i\right) = \psi_{parity}$$
such that $a_i$ depends only on the $S_R$ equivalence class of the mask $\psi_i$, and thus, only depends on the size of the mask $\psi_i$. That is, there exists real numbers $b_0, b_1, ..., b_{|R|-1}$ such that if $\psi_i$ is the mask on $A$, then $a_i = b_{|A|}$.

Now we can explicitly calculate the perceptron on any subset $X \subset R$.

Since $X$ contains $\binom{|X|}{k}$ subsets of size $k$, we plug in the perceptron’s formula and calculate:
$$\psi_{parity}(X) = \theta\left(\sum_{k=0}^{|R|-1} b_k \binom{|X|}{k} \right)$$

Now, define the polynomial function
$$p(x) := \sum_{k=0}^{|R|-1} b_k \binom{x}{k}$$
where $\binom{x}{k} = \frac{x(x-1) \cdots(x-k+1)}{k!}$. It has at most degree $|R|-1$. then since $\theta(p(|X|)) = \psi_{parity}(X)$, for each $|X| = 0, 1, 2, ..., |R|$, we have
$$p(0) - \epsilon > 0, \quad p(1) - \epsilon < 0, \quad p(2) - \epsilon > 0, \quad \cdots$$
for a small positive $\epsilon$.

Thus, the degree $\leq |R|-1$ polynomial $p-\epsilon$ has at least $|R|$ different roots, one on each $(0, 1), (1, 2), ..., (|R|-1, |R|)$, contradiction.

Theorem 5.9—The only topologically invariant predicates of finite order are functions of the Euler number $E$.

That is, if $\psi$ is a boolean function that depends on topology can be implemented by a perceptron of order $k$, such that $k$ is fixed, and does not grow as $R$ grows into a larger and larger rectangle, then $\psi$ is of form $f \circ E$, for some function $f: \N \to 2$.

Proof: omitted.

Section 5.5, due to David A. Huffman—Let $R_n$ be the rectangle of shape $5n \times (2n+12)$, then as $n\to\infty$, the connectedness function on $R_n$ has order growing at least as fast as $\Omega(|R_n|^{1/2})$.

Proof sketch: By reducing the parity function to the connectness function, using circuit gadgets. It is in a similar style as the one showing that Sokoban is NP-hard.

== Reception and legacy ==
Perceptrons received a number of positive reviews in the years after publication. In 1969, Stanford professor Michael A. Arbib stated, "[t]his book has been widely hailed as an exciting new chapter in the theory of pattern recognition." Earlier that year, CMU professor Allen Newell composed a review of the book for Science, opening the piece by declaring "[t]his is a great book."

On the other hand, H.D. Block expressed concern at the authors' narrow definition of perceptrons. He argued that they "study a severely limited class of machines from a viewpoint quite alien to Rosenblatt's", and thus the title of the book was "seriously misleading". Contemporary neural net researchers shared some of these objections: Bernard Widrow complained that the authors had defined perceptrons too narrowly, but also said that Minsky and Papert's proofs were "pretty much irrelevant", coming a full decade after Rosenblatt's perceptron.

Perceptrons is often thought to have caused a decline in neural net research in the 1970s and early 1980s. During this period, neural net researchers continued smaller projects outside the mainstream, while symbolic AI research saw explosive growth.

With the revival of connectionism in the late 80s, PDP researcher David Rumelhart and his colleagues returned to Perceptrons. In a 1986 report, they claimed to have overcome the problems presented by Minsky and Papert, and that "their pessimism about learning in multilayer machines was misplaced".

== Analysis of the controversy ==
It is most instructive to learn what Minsky and Papert themselves said in the 1970s as to what were the broader implications of their book. On his website Harvey Cohen, a researcher at the MIT AI Labs 1974+, quotes Minsky and Papert in the 1971 Report of Project MAC, directed at funding agencies, on "Gamba networks": "Virtually nothing is known about the computational capabilities of this latter kind of machine. We believe that it can do little more than can a low order perceptron." In the preceding page Minsky and Papert make clear that "Gamba networks" are networks with hidden layers.

Minsky has compared the book to the fictional book Necronomicon in H. P. Lovecraft's tales, a book known to many, but read only by a few. The authors talk in the expanded edition about the criticism of the book that started in the 1980s, with a new wave of research symbolized by the PDP book.

How Perceptrons was explored first by one group of scientists to drive research in AI in one direction, and then later by a new group in another direction, has been the subject of a sociological study of scientific development.
