= David Waltz =

American computer scientist (1943–2012)

David Leigh Waltz
- Born: May 28, 1943; Boston, Massachusetts, U.S.
- Died: 22 March 2012 (aged 68); Princeton, New Jersey, U.S.
- Education: Massachusetts Institute of Technology
- Awards: ACM Fellow; AAAI Fellow
- Scientific career
- Fields: Artificial intelligence; Computer vision; Natural language processing
- Workplaces: Columbia University; NEC Research; Brandeis University; Thinking Machines Corporation; University of Illinois at Urbana-Champaign
- Thesis: Generating Semantic Description from Drawings of Scenes with Shadows (1972)
- Doctoral advisor: Patrick Winston
- Doctoral students: Tim Finin; Jordan Pollack; Stephen E. Cross; Ron Sun
- Website: www.cs.columbia.edu/~waltz

David Leigh Waltz (28 May 1943 – 22 March 2012) was a computer scientist who made significant contributions in several areas of artificial intelligence, including constraint satisfaction, case-based reasoning and the application of massively parallel computation to AI problems. He held positions in academia and industry and at the time of his death, was a professor of Computer Science at Columbia University where he directed the Center for Computational Learning Systems.

== Education ==
Waltz was born in Boston, Massachusetts in 1943. He attended the Massachusetts Institute of Technology (MIT) where, as a student of artificial intelligence pioneer Marvin Minsky, he was part of the MIT Artificial Intelligence Laboratory and received S.B. (1965), M.S. (1968) and Ph.D. (1972) degrees, all in Electrical Engineering.

His Ph.D. dissertation on computer vision initiated the field of constraint propagation, which allowed a computer program to generate a detailed three-dimensional view of an object given a two dimensional drawing with shadows.

== Career ==
Following his graduate work at MIT in 1972, Waltz became a professor of computer science at the University of Illinois at Urbana-Champaign. In 1984 he joined Thinking Machines Corporation where he led the Knowledge Representation and Natural Language (KRNL) group. There, his access to massively parallel supercomputers enabled him to work on new methods for information retrieval involving comparisons to large amounts of data. With Craig Stanfill, he originated the field of memory-based reasoning branch of case-based reasoning. His research interests also included massively parallel information retrieval, data mining, learning and automatic classification with applications protein structure prediction, and natural language processing and machine learning applications applied to the electric power grid. While at Thinking Machines, Waltz was also a Professor of Computer Science at Brandeis University. In 1993 Waltz left Thinking Machines to join NEC Research Institute in Princeton, where he eventually rose to become President of NEC Research. Waltz joined Columbia University in 2003 as the Director of the Center for Computational Learning Systems.

Waltz served as president of the Association for the Advancement of Artificial Intelligence (AAAI) from 1997 to 1999 and is the former Chairman of the Association for Computing Machinery (ACM) Special Interest Group on Artificial Intelligence (SIGART). He was on the Advisory Board for IEEE Intelligent Systems, and the board of the Computing Community Consortium of the Computing Research Association, and National Science Foundation (NSF) Computer Science Advisory Board.

He was on the Army Research Lab Technical Advisory Board and the Advisory Board of the Florida Institute for Human and Machine Cognition, the Technical Advisory Board of Cork Constraint Computation Center (4C), Ireland, and served on recent external advisory boards for Rutgers University, Carnegie Mellon University, Brown University, and École Polytechnique Fédérale de Lausanne (EPFL).

== Awards ==
Waltz was elected a Fellow of Association for the Advancement of Artificial Intelligence (AAAI) in 1990 and a Fellow of the Association for Computing Machinery in 1998. In 2011 he was selected as the recipient of the AAAI Distinguished Service Award for extraordinary and sustained service to the artificial intelligence community.

== Personal life ==
David Waltz was married to Bonnie (Freedson) Waltz in 1970. They had two children, Vanessa Waltz (born 1972) and Jeremy Waltz (born 1975). In addition to his dedication to the scientific community, he was an extremely devoted husband and father, and his wife and children traveled regularly with him to many conferences and professional engagements throughout his career. Jeremy and wife Kathy had granddaughter Hannah in 2003, at which point "The Dude" became Waltz's nickname among family and friends.

=== Death ===
David Waltz died in the University Medical Center at Princeton, New Jersey on March 22, 2012 from brain cancer; he was 68 years old. Besides his wife, Bonnie Waltz, he is survived by a brother, Peter; a son, Jeremy; a daughter, Vanessa Waltz, and a granddaughter.
