= G.V. Shivashankar =

- Born: 1968 (age 57–58); India
- Education: Rockefeller University
- Occupation: Biophysicist

G.V. Shivashankar (born 1968) is an Indian biophysicist working in the field of Mechanobiology. His research focuses on understanding the coupling between cell mechanics and genome organization for the regulation of cell homeostasis and cell state transitions. In addition his group also developed imaging-AI based chromatin biomarkers as fingerprints for cells in health and disease. Towards this, his group employs multi-scale correlative bio-imaging methods combined with bioengineered interfaces, functional genomics, theoretical modeling, and machine learning. He currently holds a full professorship for Mechano-Genomics at the Department of Health Sciences and Technology at ETH Zurich and he also heads the Laboratory of Nanoscale Biology at the Paul Scherrer Institute.

== Education and career ==
Shivashankar was born in 1968 in India, where he began his academic career studying physics at Bangalore University. After graduating with a Bachelor of Science in 1988, he was a research fellow at the Indian Institute of Science, Bangalore. He then joined the NEC Laboratories America, Princeton formally known as the NEC Research Institute and Rutgers University, where he obtained a master's degree in engineering in 1994. Subsequently, Shivashankar joined the Rockefeller University, where he obtained his Ph.D. in Biophysics under the supervision of Albert J. Libchaber in 1999. In his doctoral thesis, Shivashankar developed new ways to combine single-molecule micromanipulation methods, thereby enabling novel insights into DNA-protein interactions.

After obtaining his Ph.D., Shivashankar spent one year as a scientist at NEC Laboratories America, Princeton, before joining the National Center for Biological Sciences (NCBS) Tata Institute of Fundamental Research (TIFR) as an Assistant Professor and the Raman Research Institute in Bangalore as a visiting scientist. Shivashankar obtained tenure at NCBS-TIFR in 2004. In 2010, he relocated to the Department of Biological Sciences at the National University of Singapore (NUS), where he served as the deputy director of the Mechanobiology Institute (2011–2019) and held a chair professorship between NUS and the FIRC Institute of Molecular Oncology (IFOM) (2014–2019). Since 2020 Shivashankar holds a full professorship for Mechano-Genomics jointly between ETH Zurich and the Paul Scherrer Institute.

== Recognition and awards ==
Shivashankar received various awards for his scientific achievements including the BM Birla Prize in 2006 and the Swarnajayanthi Fellowship in 2007. In 2010 he was elected as a Fellow of the Indian Academy of Sciences and in 2019 as a member of the European Molecular Biology Organization (EMBO).
