= ChemXSeer =

Public digital library and database

ChemXSeer project (stylized as Chem_{X}Seer, funded by the National Science Foundation, is a public integrated digital library, database, and search engine for scientific papers in chemistry. It is being developed by a multidisciplinary team of researchers at the Pennsylvania State University. ChemXSeer was conceived by Dr. Prasenjit Mitra, Dr. Lee Giles and Dr. Karl Mueller as a way to integrate the chemical scientific literature with experimental, analytical, and simulation data from different types of experimental systems. The goal of the project is to create an intelligent search and database which will provide access to relevant data to a diverse community of users who have a need for chemical information. It is hosted on the World Wide Web at the College of Information Sciences and Technology, The Pennsylvania State University.

== Features ==
In order to provide access to relevant data to users ChemXSeer provides new features that are not available in traditional search engines or digital libraries.

1. Chemical Entity Search: A tool capable of identifying Chemical formulae and chemical names, and extracting and disambiguating them from general terms within documents. Those disambiguated terms are used for performing searches.
2. TableSeer: In scholarly articles Tables are used to present, list, summarize, and structure important data. TableSeer automatically identifies tables in digital documents, extracts the table Metadata as well as the cells content, and stores them in such a way that allows users to either query the table content or search for tables in a large set of documents.
3. Dataset search: ChemXSeer provides tools to incorporate datasets from different experiments sources. The system is able to manipulate results from multiple formats such as XML, Microsoft Excel, Gaussian, and CHARMM, create databases, to allow direct queries over the data, create Metadata, using an annotation tool, which will allow users to search over the datasets, as well as a way to create links among datasets and/or between datasets and documents.

In addition to these tools, ChemXSeer will integrate the advances made by its sister project CiteSeerX to provide:

- Full text search
- Author, affiliation, title and venue search
- Citation and acknowledgement search
- Citation linking and statistics

== See also ==
- CiteSeerX
