= Convia =

US electronic component manufacturer

Convia, Inc., based in Buffalo Grove, Illinois, is an American manufacturer of components which provide an integrated energy management platform that allows for the control and metering of lighting, plug-loads and HVAC. It is one of the first companies to deliver and control power while at the same time monitoring energy and adapting its use in real-time.

== History ==
In the late 1990s, Herman Miller, Inc., Convia's parent company, realized that they could not create truly flexible environments until the infrastructure of the building became more flexible. They decided that if a building infrastructure embraced technology, the applications, including systems furniture, could also take advantage of that infrastructure and become more intelligent. The need for intelligent infrastructure led Herman Miller to partner with a leading technology think tank called Applied Minds in Glendale, California and their founder Danny Hillis. Danny Hillis is considered a pioneer of the parallel computing industry and is the lead designer of Convia. Convia was launched in 2004.

== Partners ==
In 2009, Herman Miller, Inc., and Legrand North America, an innovative manufacturer of electrical and network infrastructure solutions, announced a strategic alliance designed to broaden the reach of energy management strategies to fuel the adoption of flexible, sustainable spaces, ultimately reducing real estate and building operating costs while improving worker productivity. Under the terms of the agreement, technology from Herman Miller's Convia, Inc. subsidiary is embedded into Wiremold wire and cable management systems from Legrand. These include modular power and lighting distribution systems, floor boxes, poke-thru devices and architectural columns, which provide flexible, accessible electric power distribution to building owners and managers. Convia technology integrates a facility's power delivery and other infrastructure and technology applications, including lighting, HVAC, and occupancy and daylight harvesting sensors into an energy efficient, easy-to manage platform. Under the new alliance, “Convia-enabled” Wiremold systems enhanced this capability by adding control and monitoring of office plug loads (the amount of energy drawn by devices from an electrical outlet) and lighting loads.

Also in 2009, recognizing that workers spend approximately 50 percent of their time away from their desks, Convia developed the Energy Manager for Herman Miller to bring energy management strategies to the workstation. The system connects building power with the modular power in a cluster of Herman Miller workstations—including Vivo interiors, My Studio Environments, Ethospace system, Prospects, and Action Office system.

== Major Clients ==
- United States Green Building Council (USGBC)
- Empire State Building
- Notre Dame
- Arizona State University
- Pasadena Art Center College of Design
- Warwick School District, Pennsylvania
- SHW Group Architecture
- Sempre Energy
- Southern California Edison
- Victoria's Secret
- Urban Outfitters
- PFG Best

== Awards ==
- Environmental Building News and GreenSpec: BuildingGreen Top-10 Product for 2009
- Buildings Magazine — 2009 Top 100 Products/Services
- 2009 Frost & Sullivan — Best Practices Award: North American Building Automation Systems Industry Innovation & Advancement of the Year Award
- Consulting Specifying Engineer — 2009 Product of the Year Finalist
- 2007 Editor's Choice: Buildings Magazine — Top Product Pick
- 35th Annual Product Report: Architectural Record Magazine — Winner
- Best of NeoCon 2007 for Workplace Technologies — Gold Winner
- Buildings Magazine — 2007 Buildings Innovation Award in Workplace Flexibility: Grand Prize Winner
- The Chicago Athenaeum: Museum of Architecture and Design — Good Design Award
