= Metaweb =

Former American data management company

Metaweb Technologies, Inc.
- Company type: Private
- Industry: Data management
- Founded: July 2005; 20 years ago
- Founder: Veda Hlubinka-Cook, Danny Hillis, John Giannandrea
- Fate: acquired by Google in July 2010
- Headquarters: San Francisco, California, United States
- Key people: Kurt Bollacker (Chief scientist); Danny Hillis (Chairman); Thomas Layton (CEO); Veda Hlubinka-Cook; EVP, product development John Giannandrea (CTO)
- Products: Freebase — an online database
- Website: www.metaweb.com

Metaweb Technologies, Inc. was a San Francisco–based company that developed Freebase, described as an "open, shared database of the world's knowledge". The company was co-founded by Danny Hillis, Veda Hlubinka-Cook and John Giannandrea in 2005.

Metaweb was acquired by Google in 2010. Google shut down Freebase in 2016, transferring some of the data that met the required notability criteria to Wikidata.

== Funding ==
On March 14, 2006, Metaweb received $15 million in funding. Investors included Benchmark Capital, Millennium Technology Ventures, and Omidyar Network. On January 15, 2008, Metaweb announced a $42.5 million Series B round led by Goldman Sachs and Benchmark Capital.

Kevin Harvey of Benchmark Capital was a member of Metaweb's board of directors.

== Acquisition ==
On July 16, 2010, Google acquired Metaweb for an undisclosed sum.
