= Triadex Muse =

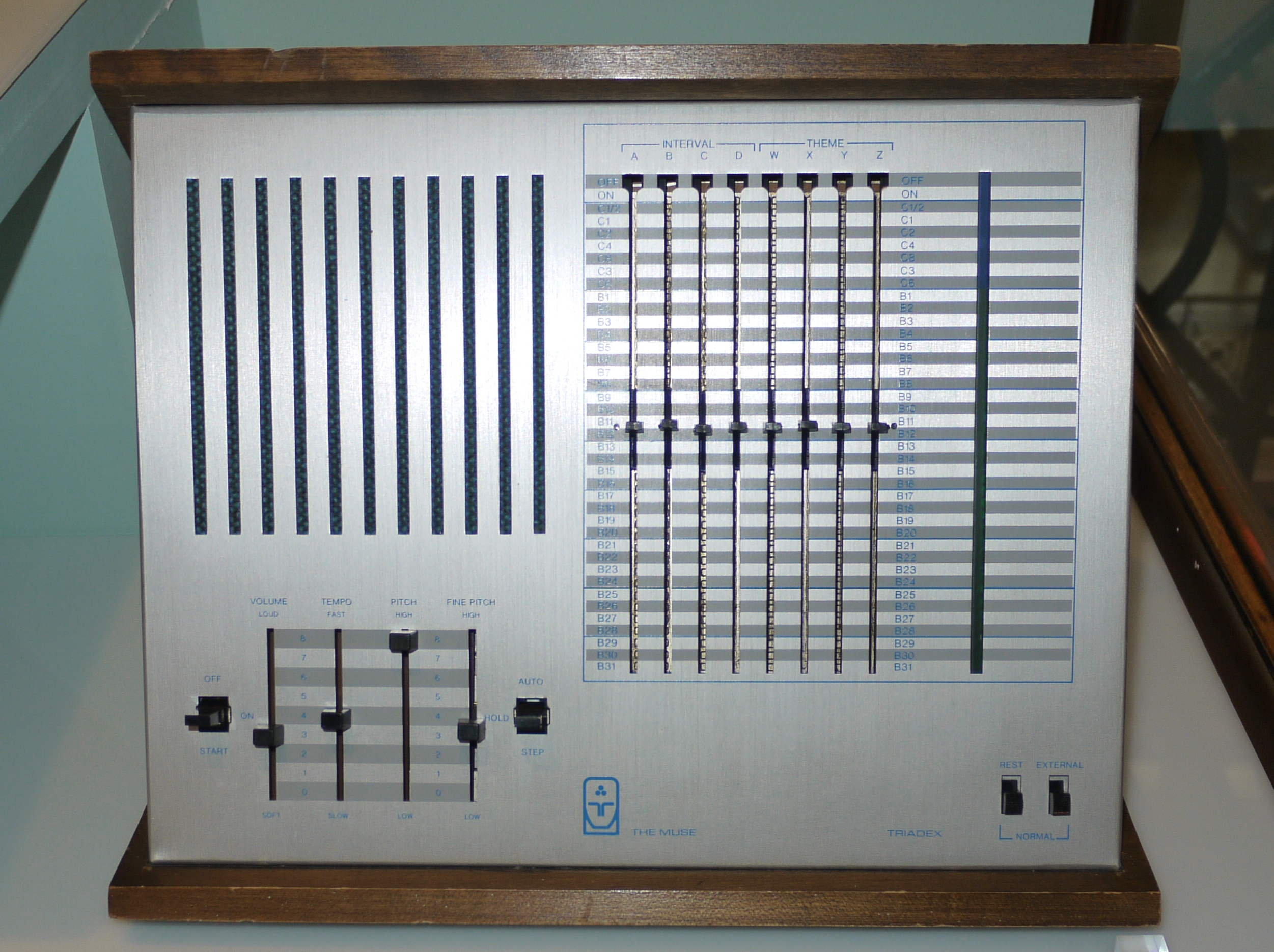
Triadex Muse

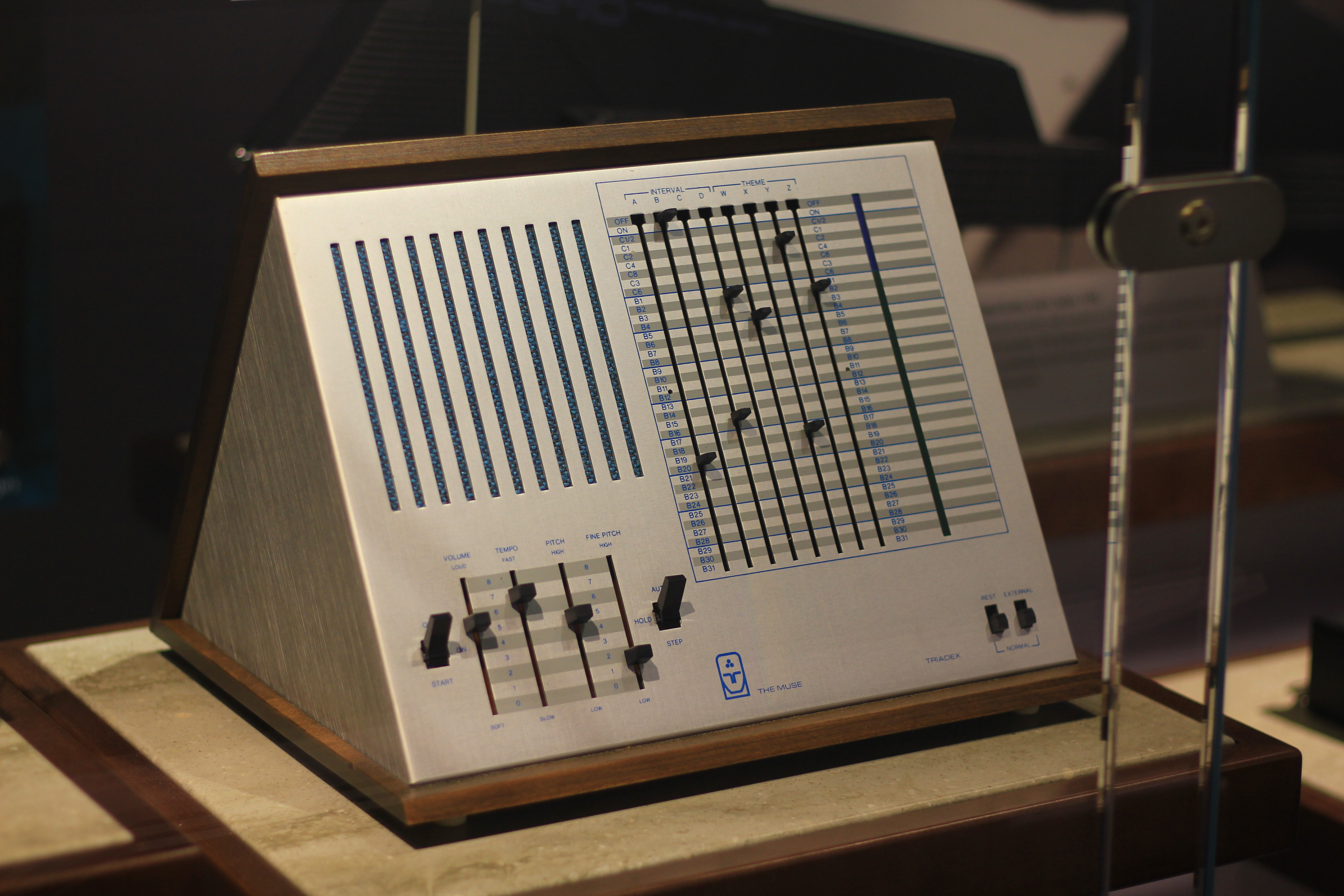
View from the side, showing the triangular shape of the case

The Triadex Muse is an early sequencer-based digital synthesizer designed by Edward Fredkin and Marvin Minsky at the Massachusetts Institute of Technology in 1969.

== Description ==
The Triadex Muse is a digital synthesizer controlled by an algorithmic sequencer utilizing early digital integrated circuits. It produces a sequence of notes derived from a master clock signal feeding a series of frequency dividers and a 31-bit shift register, including the ability to feed outputs from the shift register back into its data inputs through an XNOR gate. Up to four of the clock divisions or shift register bits are then used to raise the pitch of the synthesizer by one of four pre-determined diatonic intervals via a resistor ladder-based digital-to-analog converter. The unit has sliders to control the tempo of the master clock, the pitch of the instrument, and the output volume; no control over the timbre of its single square wave oscillator is provided, as the instrument's creators intended it as a proof of concept and compositional tool more than an instrument in its own right. Multiple Muses could be linked together to share a common tempo.

The Muse retailed for $300.00 (equivalent to $2,633.85 in 2025) on release. Triadex also manufactured a matching amplifier for the instrument and a "light show" box that flashed lamps in time with the four bits controlling the Muse's pitch. No more than three hundred Muses were made, and far fewer remain in operational condition today.

A Muse was a featured exhibit for years at the Museum of Science in Boston, playing a single continuous melody that the staff dubbed "Museum Musings".

The Muse is the subject of U. S. Patent 3610801.

== Notable users ==
The device was known to be used by the first wave of electronic musicians in the Philadelphia area in the late 70s. Users included Charles Cohen, Lenny Seidman, Jeff Caine, George Kuetemeyer, Eddie Jobson, Rex X Ray and Stephan Spera, Paul Wozniki, and the groups Heavenside Layer, Ghostwriters, Watersports, and The Orchestra of Philadelphia Electronic Musicians.

The Muse was also used during the WXPN radio show Star's End by host Gino Wong in the fall of 1977.

During her time as a fellow at the MIT Center for Advanced Visual Studies, Maryanne Amacher famously composed much of her "eartone" music using a Muse given to her by Marvin Minsky.

Morgan Fisher, a British avant-garde musician/composer based in Tokyo, currently owns two Muses and has programmed them to "perform" together in harmony using Molex cables.

Eddie Jobson used a Muse to create the sequenced effects on “Alaska” by UK.
