= Danny Hillis =

American computer scientist (born 1956)

Daniel Hillis
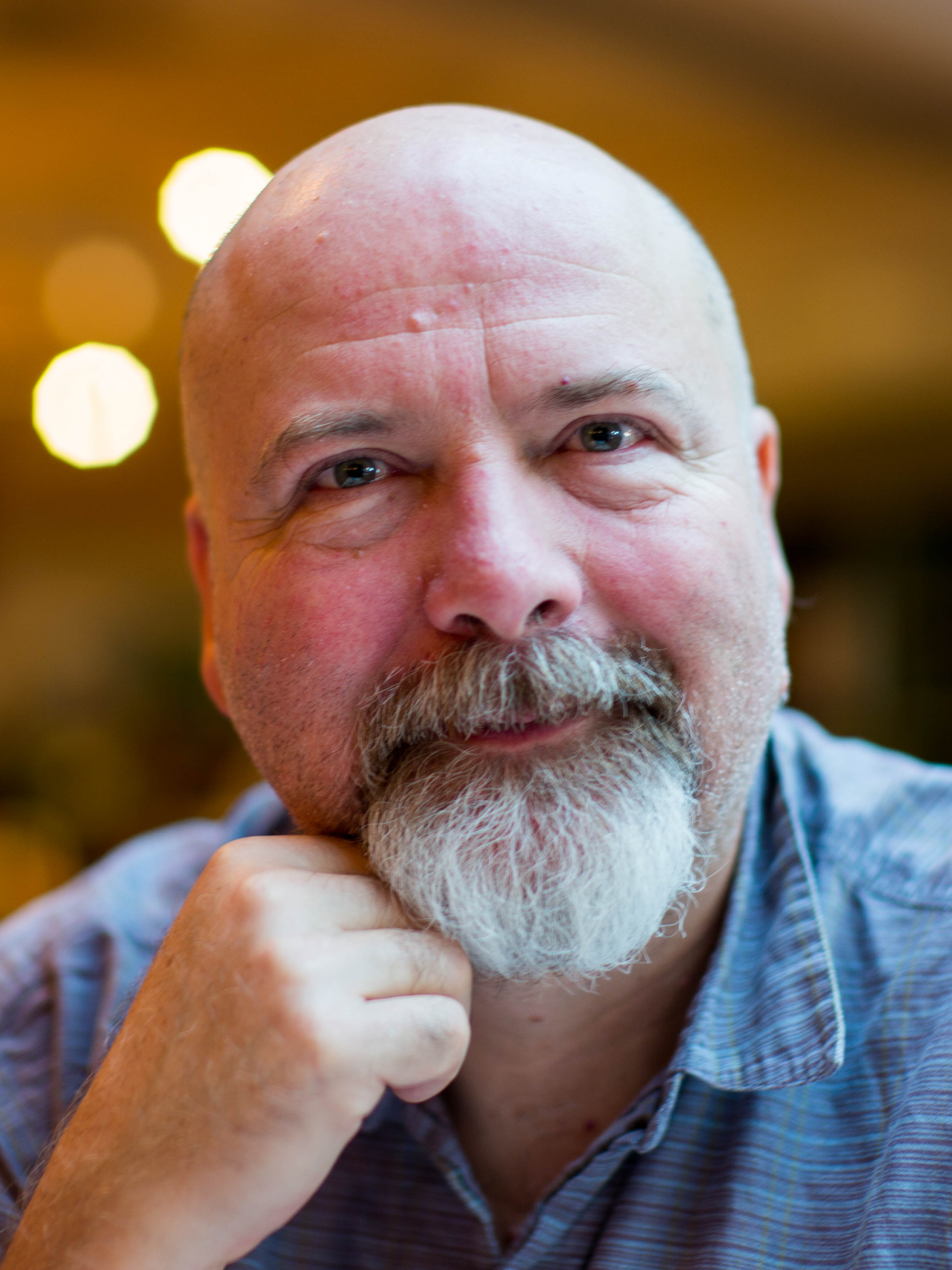
- Hillis in 2014
- Born: William Daniel Hillis; September 25, 1956 (age 70); Baltimore, Maryland, U.S.
- Education: Massachusetts Institute of Technology (BS, PhD)
- Spouse: Taylor Milsal (m. 2019)
- Awards: Dan David Prize (2002); Grace Murray Hopper Award (1989)
- Scientific career
- Fields: Computer Science; Computer Engineering
- Workplaces: Thinking Machines; Walt Disney Imagineering; Applied Invention
- Thesis: The Connection Machine (1985)
- Doctoral advisor: Marvin Minsky; Gerald Jay Sussman; Claude Shannon

William Daniel Hillis (born September 25, 1956) is an American inventor, entrepreneur, and computer scientist, who pioneered parallel computers and their use in artificial intelligence. He founded Thinking Machines Corporation, a parallel supercomputer manufacturer, and subsequently was Vice President of Research and Disney Fellow at Walt Disney Imagineering.

Hillis was elected a member of the National Academy of Engineering in 2001 for advances in parallel computers, parallel software, and parallel storage.

More recently, Hillis co-founded Applied Minds, and Applied Invention, an interdisciplinary group of engineers, scientists, and artists.

== Biography ==
=== Early life and academic work ===
Born September 25, 1956, in Baltimore, Maryland, Danny Hillis spent much of his childhood living overseas, in Europe, Africa, and Asia.

He attended the Massachusetts Institute of Technology (MIT) and received his bachelor of science in mathematics in 1978. As an undergraduate, he worked at the MIT Logo Laboratory under the tutelage of Seymour Papert, developing computer hardware and software for children. During this time, he also designed computer-oriented toys and games for the Milton Bradley Company. While still in college, he co-founded Terrapin Inc., a producer of computer software, including Logo, for elementary schools.

As a graduate student at the MIT Computer Science and Artificial Intelligence Laboratory, Hillis designed tendon-controlled robot arms and a touch-sensitive robot "skin".

During his college years, Hillis was part of the team that built a computer composed entirely of Tinkertoys, currently at the Computer History Museum in Mountain View, California.

At MIT, Hillis began to study Artificial Intelligence under Marvin Minsky. In 1981, he proposed building a massively parallel computer for Artificial Intelligence, consisting of a million processors, each similar to a modern Graphics Processing Unit. This work culminated in the design of a massively parallel computer with 64,000 processor cores. He named it the Connection Machine, and it became the topic of his PhD, for which he received the 1985 Association for Computing Machinery Doctoral Dissertation award. Hillis earned his doctorate as a Hertz Foundation Fellow at the Massachusetts Institute of Technology, under the supervision of Marvin Minsky, Claude Shannon and Gerald Sussman, receiving his PhD in 1988. He later served as an adjunct professor at the MIT Media Lab, where he wrote The Pattern on the Stone. Hillis was later appointed Judge Widney Professor of Engineering and Medicine at USC, and a Visiting Professor at MIT. Hillis served on various thesis committees, including PhD committees of Jennifer Groff, Travis Rich, Ariel Ekblaw, and Sunanda Sharma.

== Technology career ==
Hillis has founded a number of technology companies, including Thinking Machines Corporation, Applied Minds, Metaweb Technologies, Applied Proteomics, and Applied Invention. Hillis has over 300 issued patents in fields including parallel computers, touch interfaces, disk arrays, forgery prevention methods, electronic and mechanical devices, and bio-medical techniques, RAID disk arrays, multicore multiprocessors and for wormhole routing in parallel processing.

=== Thinking Machines ===
As a graduate student at MIT, Hillis co-founded Thinking Machines Corporation to produce and market parallel computers, developing a series of influential products called the Connection Machine. At the time the company produced many of the fastest computers in the world. The Connection Machine was used in demanding computation and data-intensive applications. It was used by the Stanford Exploration Project for oil exploration and for pioneering data mining applications by American Express, as well as many scientific applications at organizations including Schlumberger, Harvard University, University of Tokyo, the Los Alamos National Laboratory, NASA, Sandia National Laboratories, National Center for Supercomputer Applications, Army High Performance Computing Research Center, University of California Berkeley, University of Wisconsin at Madison, and Syracuse University.

At Thinking Machines, he built a team of scientists, designers, and engineers, including people in the field as well as those who later became leaders and innovators in multiple industries. The team included Sydney Brenner, Richard Feynman, Brewster Kahle, and Eric Lander.

=== Disney Imagineering ===
In 1996, Hillis joined The Walt Disney Company in the newly created role of Disney Fellow and as vice president, Research and Development at Disney Imagineering. He developed new technologies and business strategies for Disney's theme parks, television, motion pictures, and consumer products businesses. He also designed new theme park rides, a full-sized walking dinosaur, and various micro mechanical devices.

=== Applied Minds ===
In 2000, Hillis co-founded the R&D think-tank Applied Minds with his Disney colleague Bran Ferren. Minds is a team of engineers, scientists, and designers that provide design and technology services for clients. The creative environment and the diverse projects it undertook gained Applied Minds abundant media attention. "It's as if Willy Wonka's chocolate factory just yawned wide to welcome us. Only here, all the candy plugs in," said an article in Wired magazine. Work done at the firm covered the range of industries and application domains, including satellites, helicopters, and educational facilities.

While at Applied Minds, Hillis designed and built a computer data center for Sun Microsystems (the Sun Modular Datacenter) that would fit into a standard 20-foot shipping container, solving, among others, the problems of accommodating processor capacity, cooling, power requirements, and storage within a portable solution. This type of "datacenter in a box," has now become a common method for building large data centers.

For Herman Miller, Hillis designed an audio privacy solution based on phonetic jumbling—Babble—which was received in the media as a version of the Cone of Silence, and was marketed through a new company, Sonare. Also for Herman Miller, Hillis developed a flexible reconfigurable power and lighting system, which was marketed through another new company, Convia.

As part of an early touchscreen map table interface, Hillis invented and patented the use of multiple touch points to control a zoom interface, which is now called "pinch to zoom.". One of these patents was the basis for the USPTO decision to reject Apple Inc.'s claim on a "pinch-to-zoom" patent in its legal dispute with Samsung, on the grounds that it was described in the Hillis patent.

=== Metaweb Technologies ===
In 2005, Hillis and others from Applied Minds founded Metaweb Technologies to develop a semantic data storage infrastructure for the Internet, and Freebase, an open, structured database of the world's knowledge. That company was acquired by Google, and its technology became the basis of the Google Knowledge Graph.

=== Cancer research and Applied Proteomics ===
In 2012, Hillis helped to create a research program on cancer and proteomics as Professor of Research Medicine at the Keck School of Medicine of USC, and the principal investigator of the National Cancer Institute's Physical Sciences in Oncology Laboratory at USC. He co-founded Applied Proteomics (API) with David Agus to make proteomics-based biomarker discovery practical. Hillis and his colleagues at API developed one of the first protein biomarker discovery platforms and a blood test for early stage colon cancer, but they were unable to convince investors to finance taking their proteomic technology to the market.

Hillis has also served as Research Professor of Engineering at the USC Viterbi School of Engineering. He was the first principal investigator of the National Cancer Institute's Physical Sciences in Oncology Laboratory at USC.

=== Applied Invention ===
In 2015, Hillis co-founded Applied Invention, an interdisciplinary group of engineers, scientists, and artists. Applied Invention develops technology solutions in partnership with other companies and entrepreneurs.

Applied Invention co-founded Dark Sky, a weather forecasting technology company with consumer web and mobile applications that was eventually sold to Apple.

== The Pattern on the Stone ==
Hillis' 1998 popular science book The Pattern on the Stone attempts to explain concepts from computer science for laymen using simple language, metaphor and analogy. It moves from Boolean algebra through topics such as information theory, parallel computing, cryptography, algorithms, heuristics, Turing machines, and evolving technologies such as quantum computing and emergent systems.

== The Long Now Foundation ==
In 1986, Hillis expressed alarm that society had what he called a "mental barrier" of looking at the year 2000 as the limit of the future. He proposed a project to build a mechanical clock that would last 10,000 years. This project became the initial project of The Long Now Foundation, which he co-founded with Stewart Brand. A prototype of the Clock of the Long Now is on display at the London Science Museum. A full-scale mechanical clock is being installed at a site inside a mountain in western Texas.

== Awards ==
Hillis is the recipient of the inaugural Dan David Prize for shaping and enriching society and public life in 2002, the 1991 Spirit of American Creativity Award for his inventions, the 1989 Grace Murray Hopper Award for his contributions to computer science, and the 1988 Ramanujan Award for his work in applied mathematics.

Hillis is a member of the National Academy of Engineering, a fellow of the Association for Computing Machinery, a fellow of the International Leadership Forum, and a Fellow of the American Academy of Arts and Sciences.
