= Jordan Pollack =

Jordan B. Pollack is a professor of computer science at Brandeis University, and director of the Dynamical and Evolutionary Machine Organization lab. Pollack's work with David Waltz was highly acclaimed by Marvin Minsky. His contributions to theoretical computer science include the demonstration of a neural network implementation of a Turing machine, the Neuring machine, in 1987. Pollack and Hod Lipson pioneered the automated design and manufacturing of robots. In January 2001 he was named one of MIT Technology Review's "TR 10".

== Biography ==
Pollack earned a Bachelor's from SUNY Binghamton, and a PhD in computer science from the University of Illinois in 1987. He taught computer science at Ohio State University (1988-1994) before moving to Brandeis, where he was chair of the computer science department from 2010 through 2019.
