= Gumball (video game) =

1983 game by Veda Hlubinka-Cook

- Apple II box art
- Publisher: Broderbund
- Designer: Veda Hlubinka-Cook
- Platforms: Apple II, Atari 8-bit, Commodore 64
- Release: 1983
- Genre: Action
- Mode: Single-player

Gumball is a video game written for the Apple II by Veda Hlubinka-Cook (credited as Robert Cook) and published by Broderbund in 1983. It was ported to the Atari 8-bit computers, and Commodore 64. The player controls the valves of a maze-like machine to sort gumballs by color.

Broderbund co-founder Doug Carlston conceived of the machine-sorting concept and Cook added the gumball concept and built the core gameplay within a week. Reviewers separately noted the difficulty of the game's later stages, praised its comical elements, and commented on the social role of simulating mundane work. An Easter egg was found three decades after the game's release.

== Gameplay ==
Players sort gumballs by color.

Gumball is an action video game in which the player works in a factory as a gumball sorter and sorts gumballs by color as they flow through a maze-like processing machine. The player controls valves in the machine to divert the flow of individual gumballs towards bins of corresponding colors. If the player sorts incorrectly, the foreman walks onscreen and dumps the gumballs out of the bin. The player has a daily quota to meet by the end of the level's time limit. If successful, the player character receives a promotion; the player watches an animation of a worker walking home from the factory, and progresses to a more complex level, with more color options to sort and defective, explosive gumballs to deactivate. If unsuccessful in meeting the daily quota, the game ends and the player is left to restart from the beginning.

The game requires a color television or monitor, and optionally works with a joystick or paddle controller.

== Development ==
Veda Hlubinka-Cook wrote Gumball for publication by Broderbund in 1983. Co-founder Doug Carlston conceived the core concept of a machine that sorts based on color, and Veda Hlubinka-Cook expanded the concept with the gumball conceit. She spent a week designing the main processing machine, with its pipes and valves. Though she later returned to add more background detail, the original pipe design did not change. Most of Cook's time was spent programming the game's functions, such as the how individual gumballs move through the pipes.

To make the game more interesting, Cook added the gumball bombs and tweaked the mechanism that caught them. She iterated through prototypes including a player-controlled claw and an item that traversed the pipes before finally deciding on crosshairs for the player to fire. Cook also added the game's time limit and the differences between levels. Closer to the end, Cook coded Gumball's title page and the animated transitions between levels.

The game debuted at the June 1983 Consumer Electronics Show.

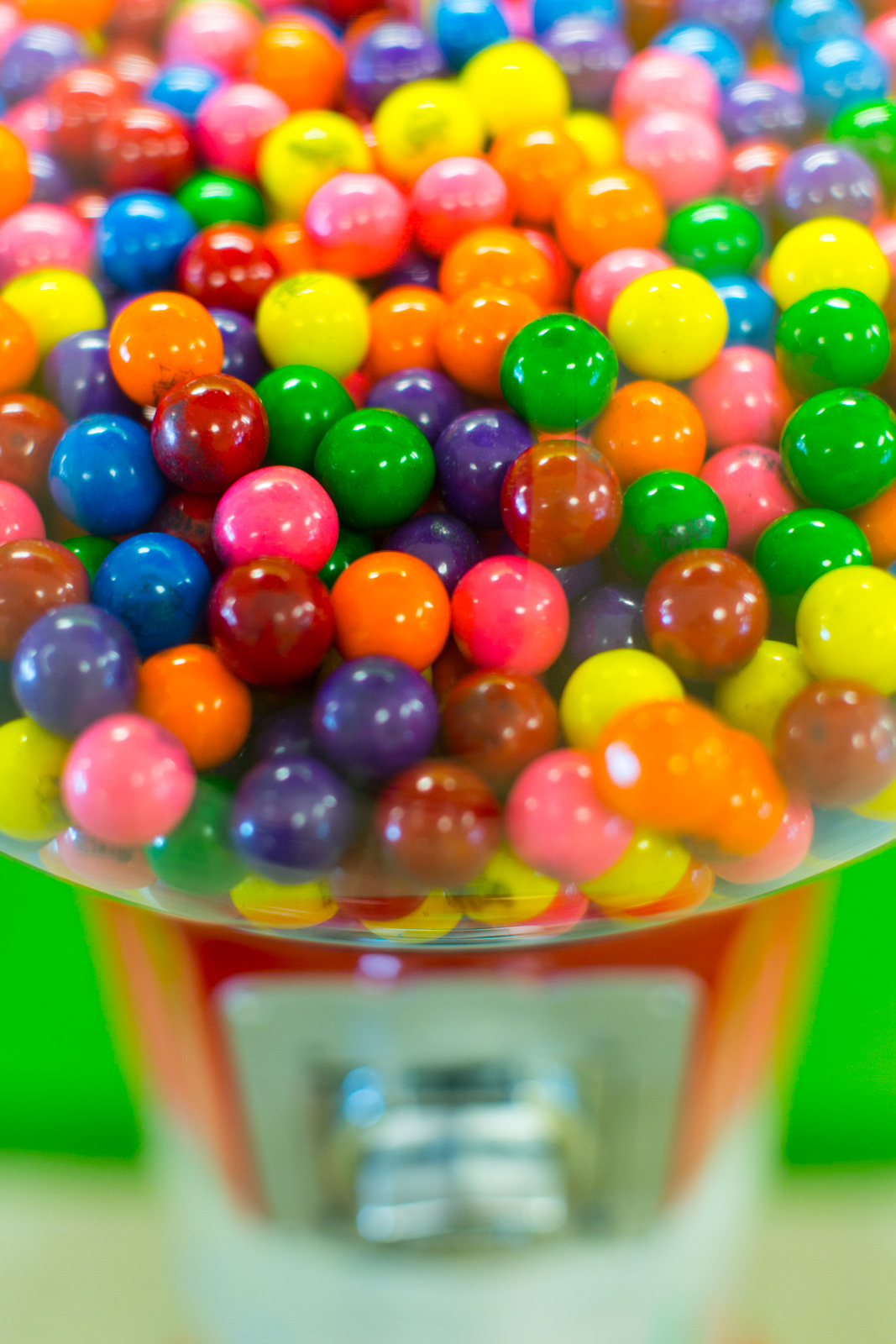
Chewing gum gumballs in a gumball machine

== Reception ==
John Besnard reviewed the game for Computer Gaming World, and stated that "The graphics of Gumball are delightful. Objects move smoothly in front of and behind each other, as if you just plugged a special graphics board into your Apple. In fact, it's worth catching a few gumballs in the wrong bins just to watch them tip over." Reviewing the Atari 8-bit version for the magazine, David Stone stated that "Gumball is fun for many of the same reasons as Spare Change Arcade: it has levels of increasing difficulty, it rewards you for mastering each level, and it requires some amount of strategy as well as timing to open and close the gates to fill the bins and meet your quota".

Chris Browning of the Eugene, Oregon-based Atari Computer Enthusiasts wrote that Gumball was a good interlude between shoot-em-up games, but found that he lost interest when tasked with sorting four or more colors of gumballs. Compute!'s Gazette thought that Gumball for Commodore 64 was fun, and highlighted its "comical" elements, such as the factory manager emptying the player's bin when the player incorrectly sorts the wrong color into it. The magazine described Gumball as a "strategy-action" game and considered it a useful aid in developing faculties of logic and hand-eye coordination. Ahoy! called the game "whimsical". David Hunter of Softalk asked whether the game was satirical commentary "on the Great American Dream of climbing the corporate ladder" depending on whether the factory work inculcated "good work habits" or "Disney-esque automatons". He wrote that the game had what corporate trainers would want: an introduction to repetitive tasks and a sense of nervous energy. Three decades later, Jason Koebler of Motherboard summarized that the game never became popular and that copies of it became rare.

== Legacy ==
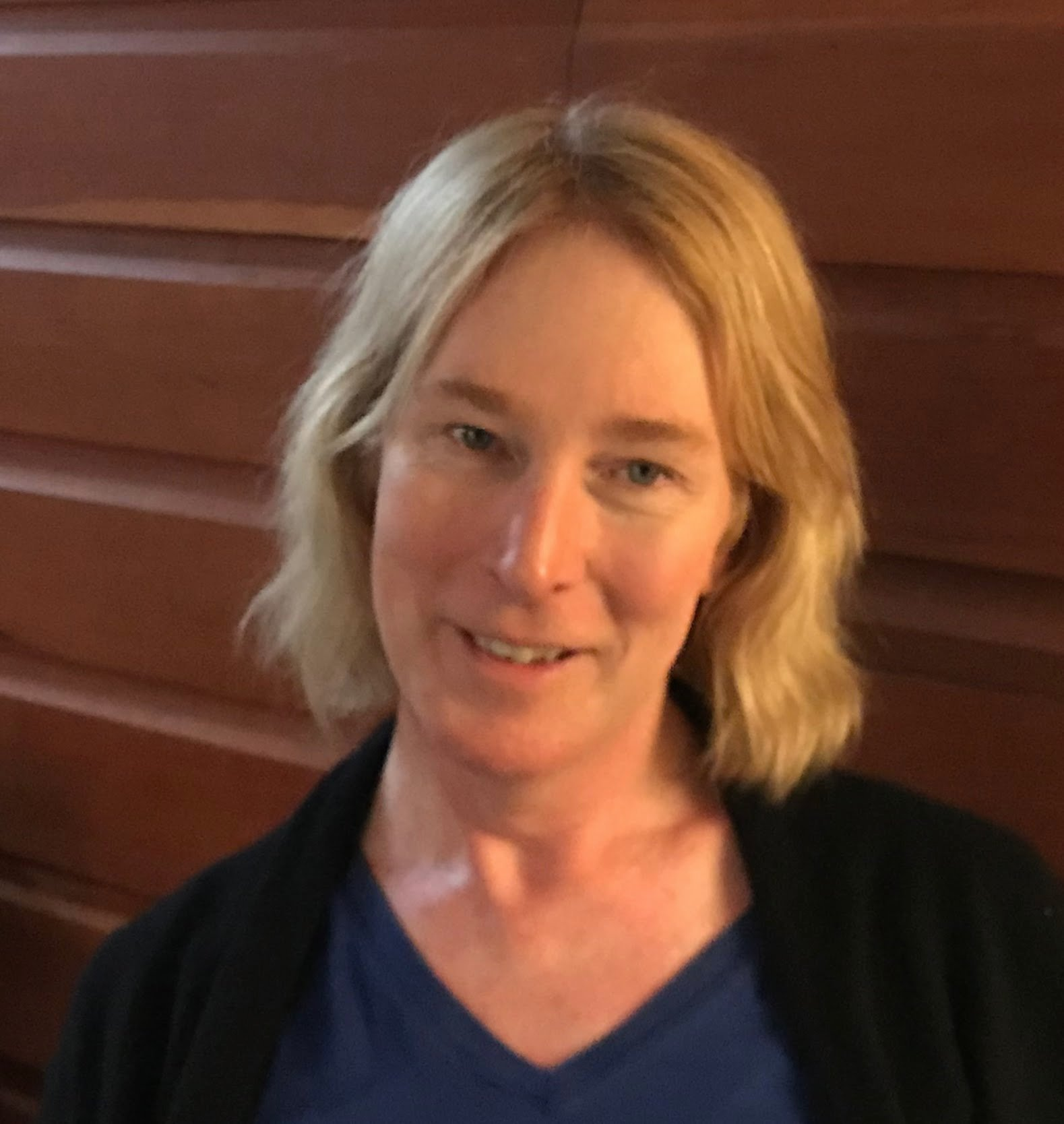
Veda Hlubinka-Cook in 2018

In 2016, an Apple II software cracker team found an Easter egg hidden by the game's creator 33 years prior. Cook had hidden a secret congratulations screen in the game for players who entered a specific keyboard key combination at a particular time and solved the resulting series of substitution ciphered clues. Cook congratulated the cracker team on Twitter. The crackers found the secret while working to preserve the game for the Internet Archive by removing its digital copyright protections. One of the crackers said that while most 1980s games could be cracked by automation, Gumball's protections, coded by Roland Gustafsson, were exceptional.
