= Benjamin Kuipers =

American computer scientist

- Born: 7 April 1949 (age 77); Grand Rapids, Michigan, United States
- Education: Massachusetts Institute of Technology, Swarthmore College
- Occupations: Computer Scientist, Professor
- Employer: University of Michigan
- Title: Fellow of the AAAI and the AAAS
- Website: www.eecs.umich.edu/~kuipers/

Benjamin Kuipers (born 7 April 1949) is an American computer scientist at the University of Michigan, known for his research in qualitative simulation.

== Biography ==
Kuipers graduated from Swarthmore College in 1970 with a B.A. in Mathematics. He then did two years of alternate service as a conscientious objector to military service, working in the Psychology Department at Harvard University. He began his doctoral studies in pure mathematics at the Massachusetts Institute of Technology. He soon discovered the field of Artificial Intelligence, and spent most of his time at the MIT Artificial Intelligence Lab, where his advisor was Marvin Minsky. He received his PhD in Mathematics from MIT in 1977. He spent a post-doctoral year as a research associate at the MIT Division for Study and Research in Education, funded by a DARPA grant to support collaborative research with BBN psychologist Albert Stevens.

Kuipers joined the Computer Science Department at the University of Texas at Austin in 1985 and became department chair in 1997. In January 2009, he moved to the University of Michigan, where he is now a professor of Computer Science and Engineering.

Kuipers is an elected fellow of the AAAI and the AAAS.

== Personal stance on military funding ==
Kuipers is also well known for his personal stance against accepting military funding for his research. As he explains in his essay, "Why don't I take military funding?", during a DARPA-funded post-doctoral year he discovered that the primary interest in his early work on cognitive maps came from military agencies with the goal of building intelligent cruise missiles. As explained in his essay, he felt that he did not want his life's work to contribute to war.

== Selected publications ==
- Kuipers, Benjamin. Qualitative reasoning: modeling and simulation with incomplete knowledge. MIT press, 1994.

=== Articles, a selection ===
- Kuipers, Benjamin. "Modeling Spatial Knowledge ." Cognitive science 2.2 (1978): 129–153.
- Kuipers, Benjamin. "Qualitative simulation." Artificial intelligence 29.3 (1986): 289–338.
- Kuipers, Benjamin, and Yung-Tai Byun. "A robot exploration and mapping strategy based on a semantic hierarchy of spatial representations." Robotics and autonomous systems 8.1 (1991): 47–63.
