= The Pattern on the Stone =

1998 book by W. Daniel Hillis

- First edition cover
- Author: W. Daniel Hillis
- Language: English
- Subject: Computer Science
- Genre: Non-fiction
- Publisher: Basic Books
- Publication date: 1998
- ISBN: 0-465-02595-1

The Pattern on the Stone: The Simple Ideas that Make Computers Work is a book by W. Daniel Hillis, published in 1998 by Basic Books (ISBN 0-465-02595-1). The book explains concepts from computer science in layman's terms by metaphor and analogy. It aims to demystify computer science by demonstrating that complex processes can be broken down into simple, repeated patterns.

== Summary ==
The book has eight chapters and two extra topics:

1. Boolean algebra
2. Information theory
3. Turing Machines
4. Universal computing
5. Algorithms
6. Cryptography
7. Heuristics
8. Parallel computing
9. Quantum computing
10. Emergence

== Reception ==
The book has been translated into many languages and has sold over a million copies.

Reviews after its release were positive. A reviewer for Science News wrote: "He begins by imparting Boolean logic through a demonstration of a machine that plays tic-tac-toe...Hillis gift is his ability to convey the logical processes of computers that begin with switches and circuitry and escalate to self-organizing learning ability relevant to parallel computing systems." William Baer said in Library Journal: "Step by step from computer logic to programming to memory and compression. The final two chapters show how computers are truly close to being thinking machines." A Booklist review said: "A delightful all-in-one introduction to computer science." Another reviewer in Technology Review wrote: "There's nothing special about silicon, Hillis wants the reader to know. The universal building blocks of computation -- simple, logical functions such as and, or, and not – can be implemented using rods and springs, water pipes and hydraulic valves, and many other physical systems."

=== Awards ===
- 1999 American Association for the Advancement of Science Prize for Books
- 1999 Los Angeles Times Book Prize for Science and Technology.
- 1999 National Book Award Finalist in Science
- 1999 Rhône-Poulenc Science Book Prize Shortlist
- 1998 Boston Globe Book Award Finalist in Nonfiction
- 1998 Guardian Award Finalist in Science
- 1998 Royal Society Winton Medal shortlist
