= Veda Hlubinka-Cook =

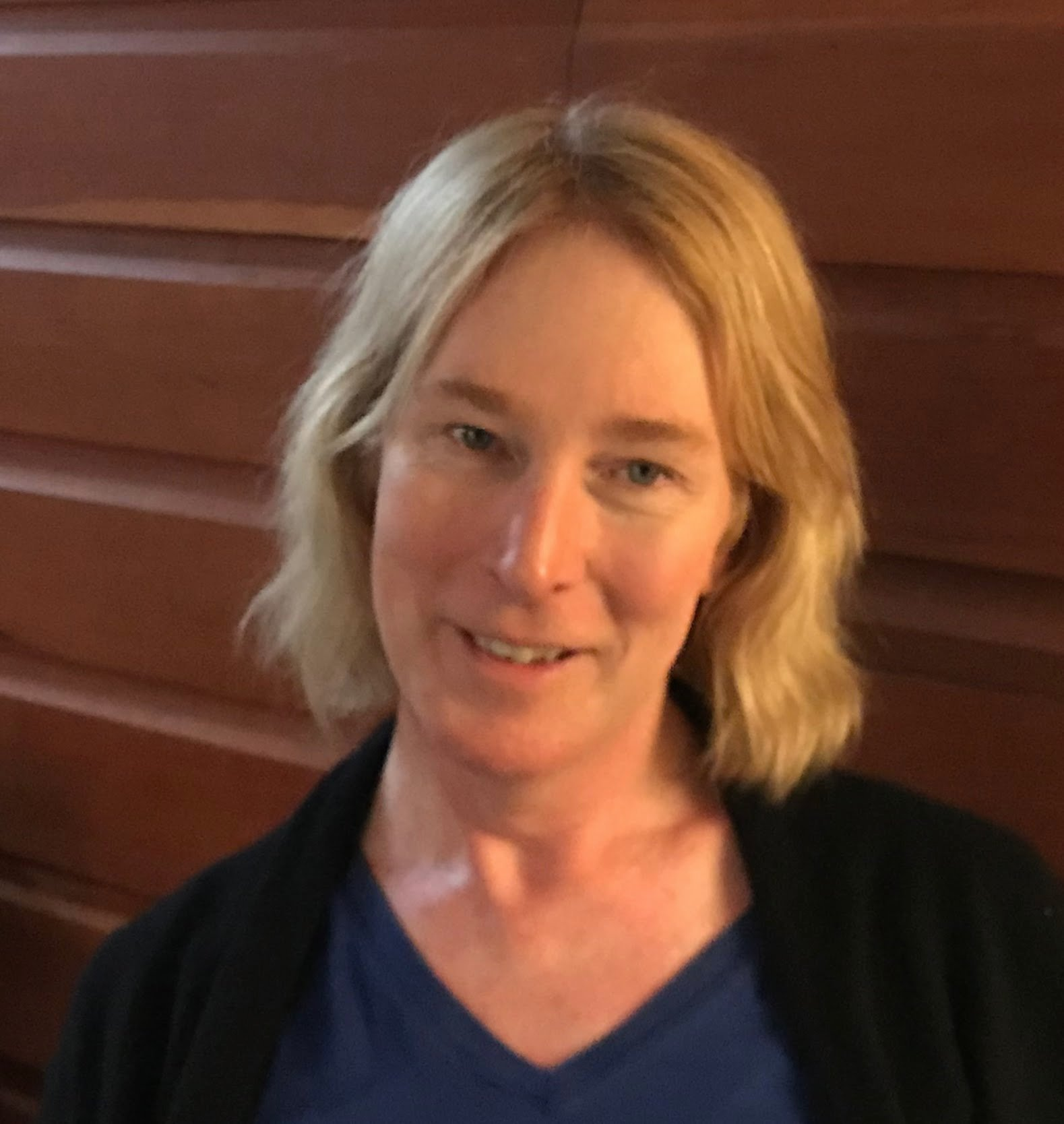
- Cook in 2018
- Born: Robert Cook; December 26, 1964 (age 61); Long Beach, California, United States
- Occupation: Computer programmer
- Years active: 2004-present
- Organization(s): Metaweb Technologies (acquired by Google in July 2010)

Veda Hlubinka-Cook (born Robert Cook, on December 26, 1964) is an American video game designer, software developer, and co-founder of Metaweb. The company was acquired by Google in 2010.

== Career ==
Cook was a video game programmer at Broderbund in the 1980s. She designed and wrote the games Gumball and D/Generation; was the model for one of the characters in Jordan Mechner's game Prince of Persia; and was technical director for The Last Express.

== Personal life ==
She came out as transgender in 2017.
