= Steve Lawrence (rugby union) =

- Full name: Stephen David Lawrence
- Born: 5 August 1899 Treorchy, Wales
- Died: 13 February 1978 (aged 78) Hirwaun, Wales

Rugby union career
- Position: Prop
International career
Years	Team	Apps	(Points)
1925–27	Wales	6	(0)

Stephen David Lawrence (5 August 1899 – 13 February 1978) was a Welsh international rugby union player.

Lawrence played his early rugby with Pontycymmer in the Garw Valley, captaining their XV in 1921. The club's home ground, Lawrence Park, was named after his brother Joe, who a long–time club secretary.

A forward, Lawrence was capped six times for Wales from 1925 to 1927, featuring in three Five Nations campaigns. He gained his selection via Bridgend and later played for Maesteg.

Lawrence was a police officer by profession.

== See also ==
- List of Wales national rugby union players
