= Marvin Minsky =

American cognitive scientist (1927–2016)

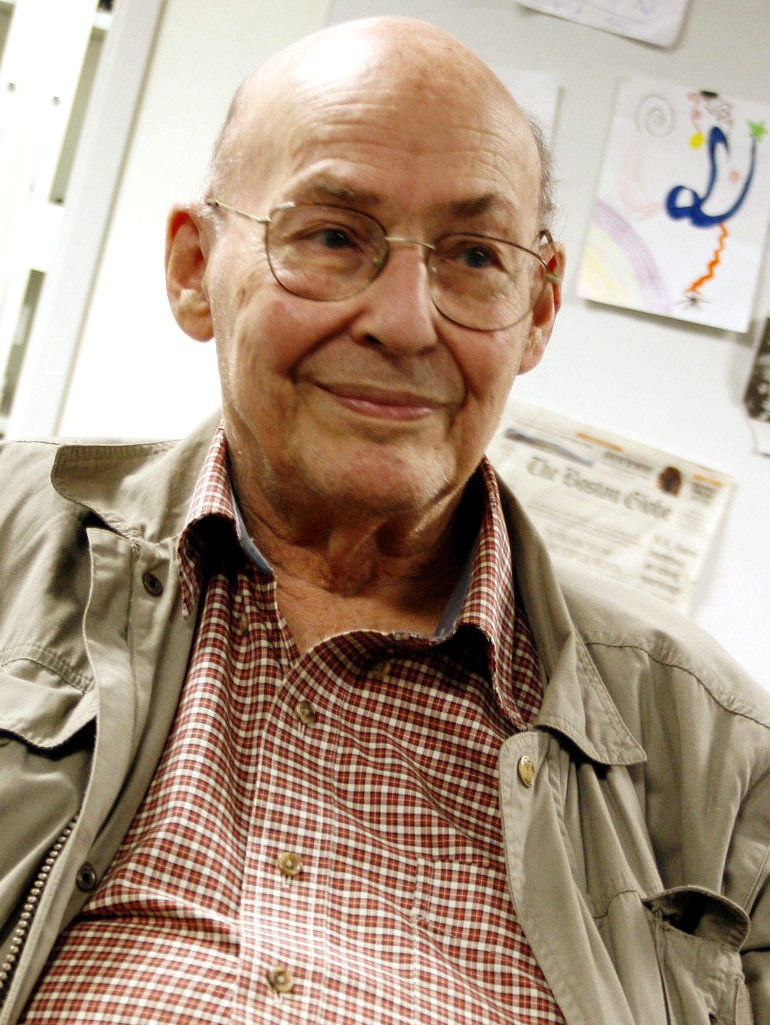
- Minsky in 2008
- Born: Marvin Lee Minsky; August 9, 1927; New York City, U.S.
- Died: January 24, 2016 (aged 88); Boston, Massachusetts, U.S.
- Education: Harvard University (BA); Princeton University (MA, PhD)
- Known for: Artificial intelligence Confocal microscope; Useless machine; Triadex Muse; Perceptrons The Society of Mind; The Emotion Machine; Frames; SNARC; Dartmouth workshop
- Spouse: Gloria Rudisch (m. 1952)
- Children: 3
- Awards: Turing Award (1969); Japan Prize (1990); AAAI Fellow (1990); IJCAI Award for Research Excellence (1991); Benjamin Franklin Medal (2001); BBVA Foundation Frontiers of Knowledge Award (2013)
- Scientific career
- Fields: Cognitive science; Computer science; Artificial intelligence; Philosophy of mind
- Workplaces: Massachusetts Institute of Technology
- Thesis: Theory of Neural-Analog Reinforcement Systems and Its Application to the Brain Model Problem (1954)
- Doctoral advisor: Albert W. Tucker
- Doctoral students: James Robert Slagle; Manuel Blum; Daniel Bobrow; Ivan Sutherland; Bertram Raphael; William A. Martin; Joel Moses; Warren Teitelman; Adolfo Guzmán Arenas; Patrick Winston; Eugene Charniak; Gerald Jay Sussman; Scott Fahlman; Benjamin Kuipers; Danny Hillis; K. Eric Drexler; Berthold K.P. Horn; Carl Hewitt
- Other notable students: Luc Steels
- Website: web.media.mit.edu/~minsky

Marvin Lee Minsky (August 9, 1927 – January 24, 2016) was an American mathematician who conducted research in the cognitive and computer science aspects of artificial intelligence (AI). After three years as a Junior Fellow of the Harvard Society of Fellows, Minsky joined the faculty at the Massachusetts Institute of Technology (MIT) in 1958 and spent the rest of his career at that institution. There, he co-founded MIT's AI laboratory, among other initiatives, and wrote extensively about AI and philosophy. Minsky, Claude Shannon, Nathaniel Rochester, and John McCarthy have been called the "fathers of AI" due to their participation in the Dartmouth workshop. At the time he was made emeritus, Minsky was the Toshiba Professor of Media Art & Sciences at MIT.

Minsky received many accolades and honors for his work, including the ACM Turing Award in 1969, the Golden Plate Award of the American Academy of Achievement in 1982, the Japan Prize in 1990, the Benjamin Franklin Medal in 2001, and of the past-present-future trio of Dan David Prizes in 2014, the "Future"-oriented prize for "Artificial Intelligence, the Digital Mind". He was elected to the U.S. National Academy of Sciences in 1973 and the U.S. National Academy of Engineering in 1989, and was inducted into IEEE Intelligent Systems' AI Hall of Fame for contributions to AI and intelligent systems in 2011.

== Early life and education ==
Marvin Lee Minsky was born on August 9, 1927, into a Jewish family in New York City. His mother was Fannie (Reiser), a Zionist activist, and his father was Henry, an eye surgeon. Minsky attended the Ethical Culture Fieldston School and the Bronx High School of Science. He later attended Phillips Academy in Andover, Massachusetts. He served in the U.S. Navy from 1944 to 1945 before returning to his education and earning a A.B. in mathematics from Harvard University (1950) and a Ph.D. in mathematics from Princeton University (1954). His doctoral dissertation was titled "Theory of neural-analog reinforcement systems and its application to the brain-model problem".

== Career ==
Minsky began his academic career as a Junior Fellow of the Harvard Society of Fellows from 1954 to 1957. He joined the MIT faculty in 1958 and remained there until his death. He joined the staff at MIT Lincoln Laboratory in 1958; a year later, he and John McCarthy initiated what was, as of 2003, named the MIT Computer Science and Artificial Intelligence Laboratory.

At the time of his death, Minsky was the Toshiba Professor of Media Arts and Sciences as well as professor of electrical engineering and computer science at MIT.

== Contributions in computer science ==
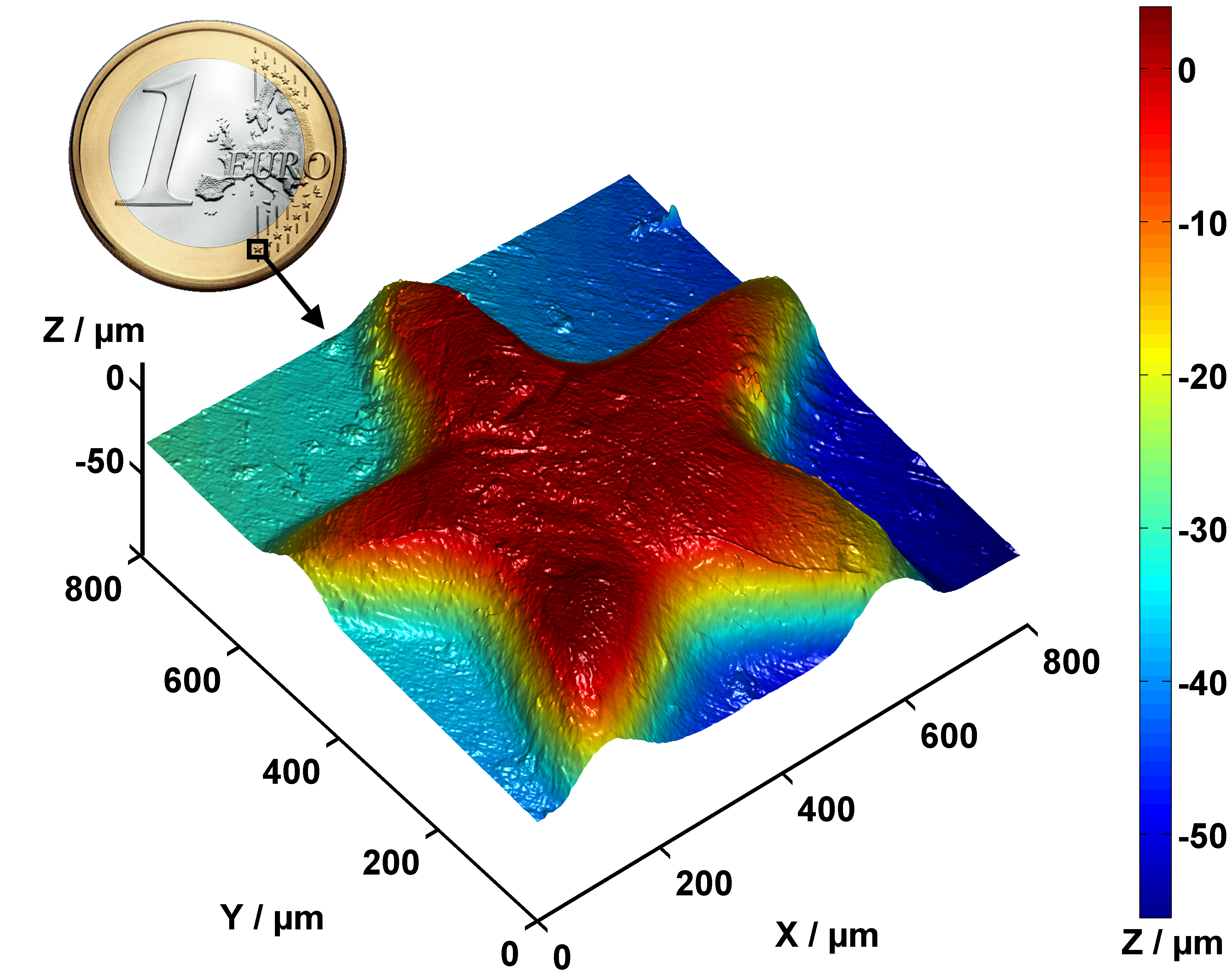
3D profile of a coin (partial) measured with a modern confocal white light microscope

Minsky's inventions include the first head-mounted graphical display (1963) and the confocal microscope (1957, a predecessor to today's widely used confocal laser scanning microscope). With Seymour Papert, he developed the first Logo programming language-driven "turtle robot". In 1951, Minsky built SNARC, which is often considered the first artificial neural network. In 1962, he worked on small universal Turing machines and published his well-known 7-state, 4-symbol machine.

Minsky and Papert's book Perceptrons attacked the work of Frank Rosenblatt on Perceptrons and became the foundational work in the analysis of artificial neural networks. The book is controversial, as some claim it greatly discouraged research on neural networks in the 1970s and contributed to the so-called "AI winter". Minsky also developed several other AI models. His paper "A Framework for Representing Knowledge" created a new paradigm in knowledge representation. Perceptrons is now viewed as of more historical than practical interest, but his theory of frames was in wide use as of 1975.

The MA-3 Robotic Manipulator Arm, on display at MIT Museum
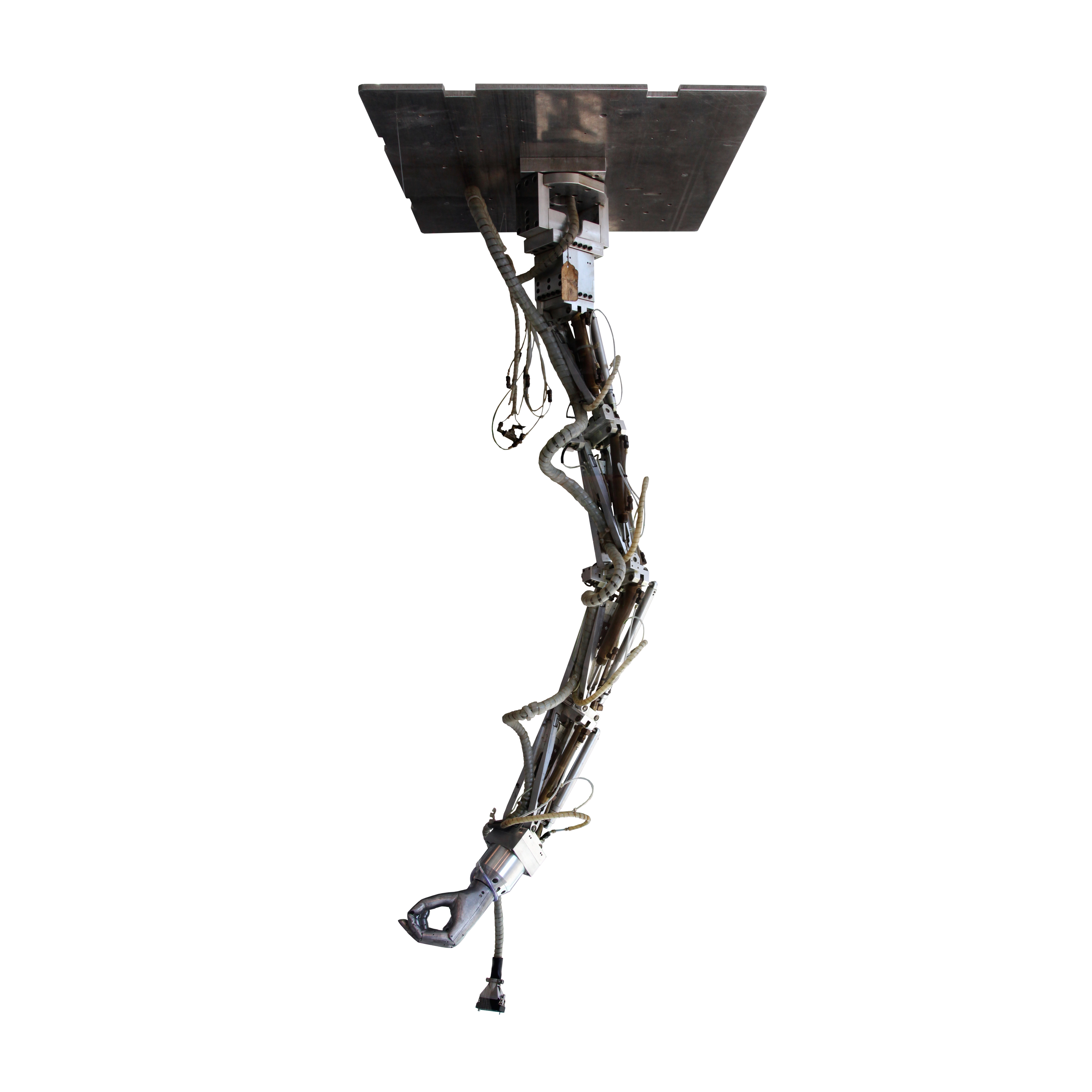
General view

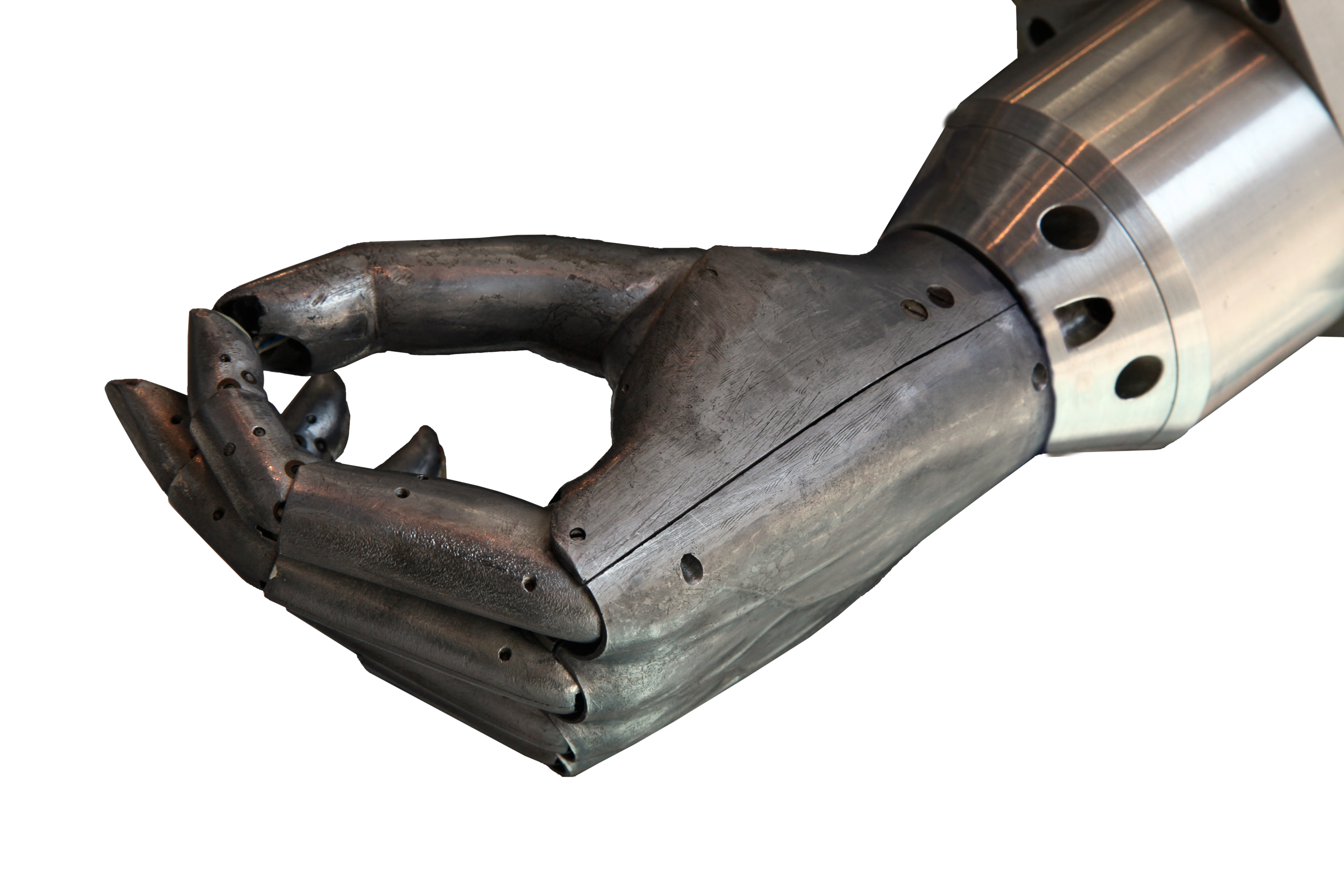
The Belgrade Hand

Minsky's book Society of Mind describes how intelligence can emerge from the cooperation of many non-intelligent "agents".

In 2006, Minsky published The Emotion Machine, a book that critiques many popular theories of how the human mind works, and suggests alternative theories, often replacing simple ideas with more complex ones.

== Role in popular culture ==
Minsky examined the possibility that extraterrestrial life may think like humans, thus permitting communication.

Minsky was an adviser to Stanley Kubrick on his movie 2001: A Space Odyssey; one of the movie's characters, Victor Kaminski, was named in Minsky's honor. Arthur C. Clarke's novel of the same name explicitly mentions Minsky. In it, he achieves a crucial breakthrough in artificial intelligence in the then-future 1980s, paving the way for HAL 9000 in the early 21st century:

In the 1980s, Minsky and Good had shown how artificial neural networks could be generated automatically—self replicated—in accordance with any arbitrary learning program. Artificial brains could be grown by a process strikingly analogous to the development of a human brain. In any given case, the precise details would never be known, and even if they were, they would be millions of times too complex for human understanding.

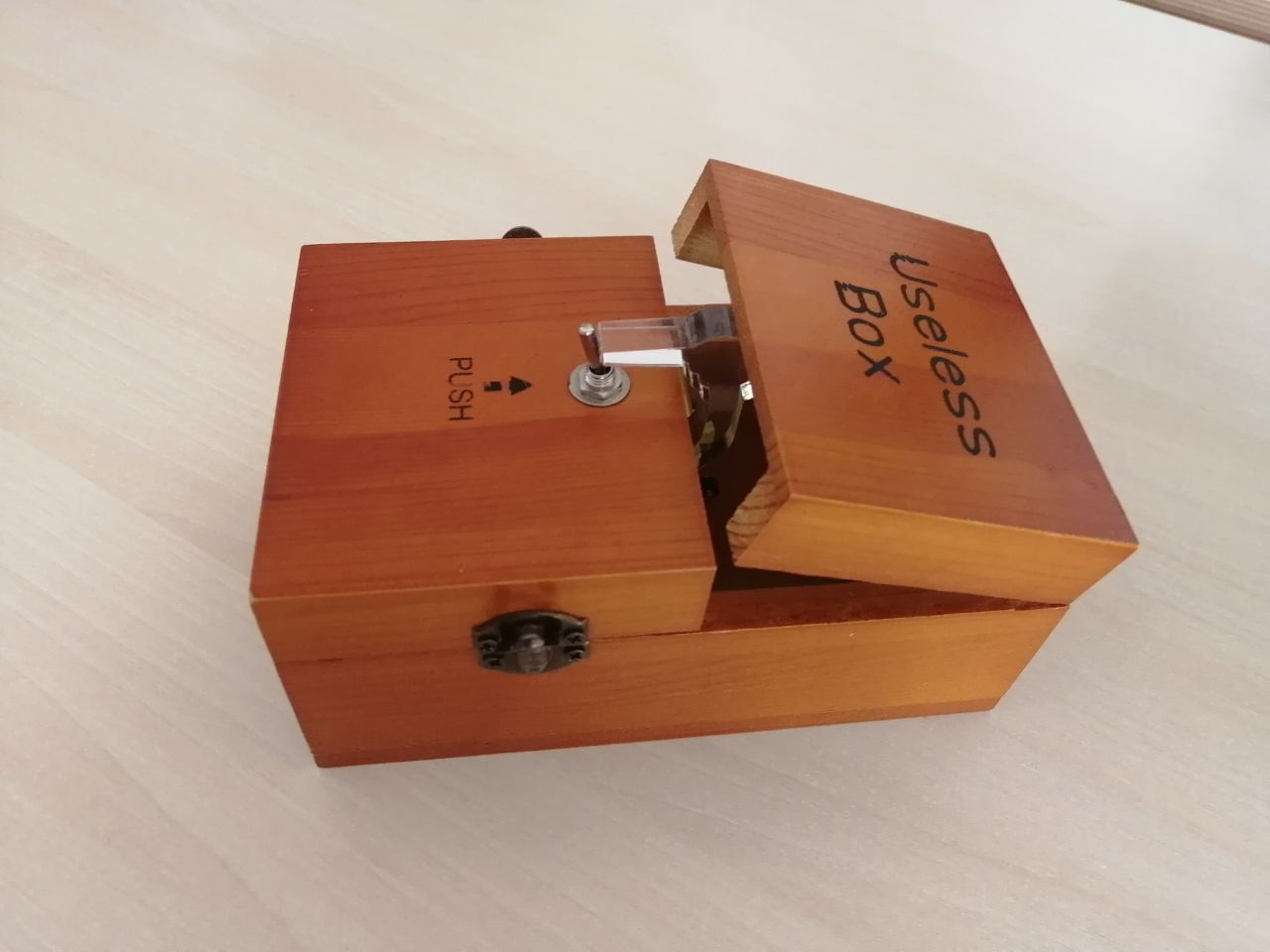
A useless box based on Minsky's design, at the moment when a device emerges from the box to switch it off.

=== Useless machines ===
While working at Bell Labs in 1952, Minsky proposed a design for a useless machine he called the "ultimate machine". When switched on, a device emerges from it to switch it back off. Claude Shannon, Minsky's mentor at the time, built the first working prototype. After seeing it, Arthur C. Clarke said, "There is something unspeakably sinister about a machine that does nothing—absolutely nothing—except switch itself off". The design regained popularity online in the 2010s. The Fargo episode "The Law of Non-Contradiction" includes a useless box and an android named Minsky.

Minsky also created a useless machine that would ring a bell if the gravitational constant were to change.

=== Media appearances ===
- Machine Dreams (1988)
- Future Fantastic (1996)

== Books ==
- 1967 – Computation: Finite and Infinite Machines, Prentice-Hall
- 1969 – Perceptrons: An Introduction to Computational Geometry, MIT Press
- 1986 – The Society of Mind
- 2006 – The Emotion Machine: Commonsense Thinking, Artificial Intelligence, and the Future of the Human Mind

== Awards and recognition ==
Minsky won the Turing Award, "computer science's highest prize", in 1969, the Golden Plate Award of the Academy of Achievement in 1982, the Japan Prize in 1990, the IJCAI Award for Research Excellence for 1991, and the Benjamin Franklin Medal from the Franklin Institute in 2001. In 2006, he was inducted as a Fellow of the Computer History Museum "for co-founding the field of artificial intelligence, creating early neural networks and robots, and developing theories of human and machine cognition." In 2011, Minsky was inducted into the IEEE Intelligent Systems' AI Hall of Fame for "significant contributions to the field of AI and intelligent systems". In 2014, from the past-present-future trio of Dan David Prizes, Minsky was awarded the "Future"-oriented prize, for "Artificial Intelligence, the Digital Mind". He also received the 2013 BBVA Foundation Frontiers of Knowledge Award in the Information and Communication Technologies category.

Minsky was elected to the U.S. National Academy of Sciences in 1973 and to the U.S. National Academy of Engineering in 1989.

Other organizations with which he was affiliated include:

- Extropy Institute's Council of Advisors;
- Alcor Life Extension Foundation's Scientific Advisory Board; and
- kynamatrix Research Network's Board of Directors.

== Personal life ==
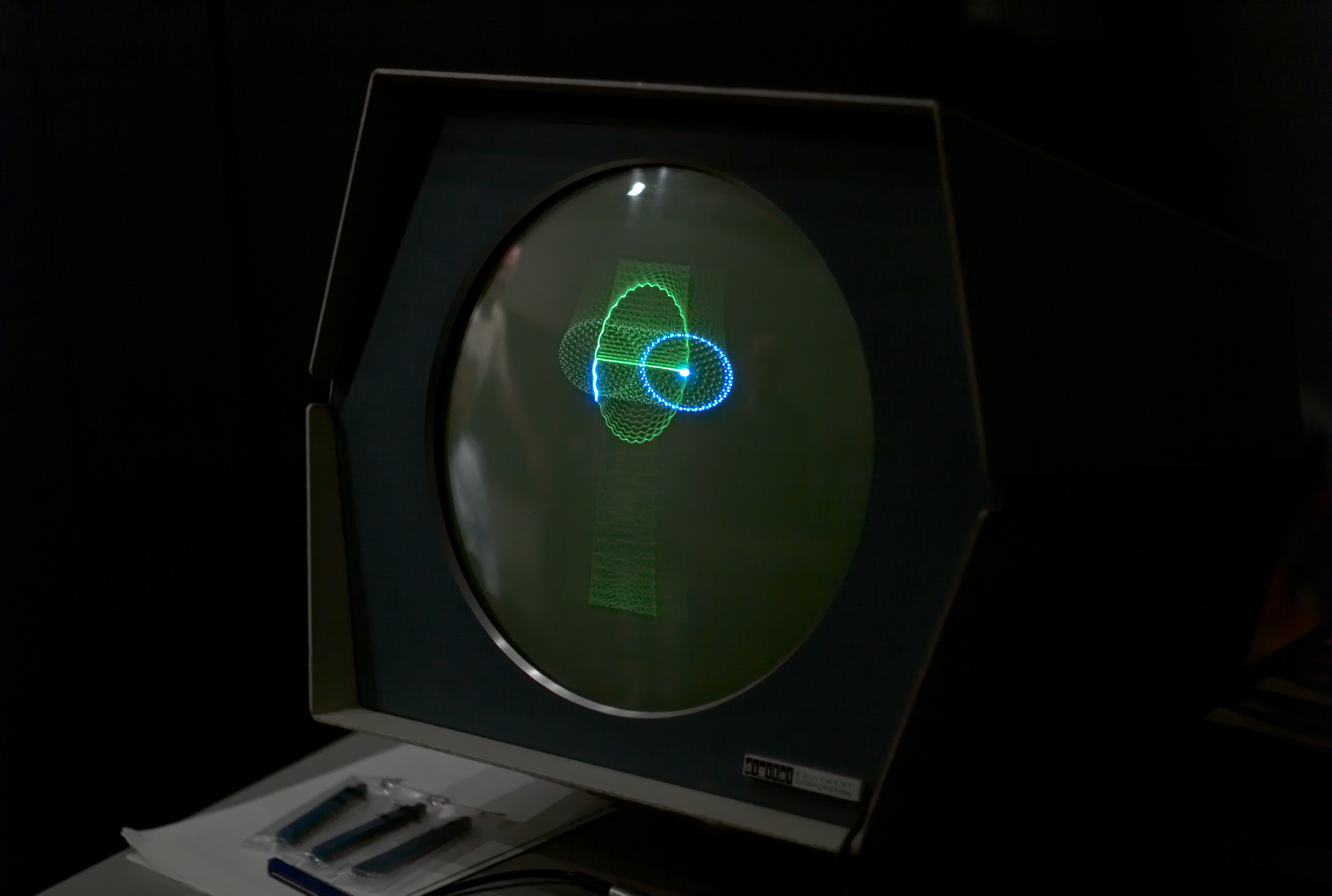
The Minskytron or "Three Position Display" running on the Computer History Museum's PDP-1, 2007

In 1952, Minsky married pediatrician Gloria Rudisch; together they had three children. Minsky was a talented improvisational pianist, and published musings on the relations between music and the mind.

=== Opinions ===
Minsky was an atheist. He was a signatory to the Scientists' Open Letter on Cryonics.

He was a critic of the Loebner Prize for conversational robots, and argued that a fundamental difference between humans and machines is that while humans are machines, they are machines in which intelligence emerges from the interplay of the many unintelligent but semi-autonomous agents the brain comprises. He argued that "somewhere down the line, some computers will become more intelligent than most people", but that it was very hard to predict how fast progress would be. He cautioned that an artificial superintelligence designed to solve an innocuous mathematical problem might decide to assume control of Earth's resources to build supercomputers to help achieve its goal, but believed that such scenarios are "hard to take seriously" because he felt confident that AI would be well tested before being deployed.

=== Association with Jeffrey Epstein ===
Minsky received a $100,000 research grant from Jeffrey Epstein in 2002, four years before Epstein's first arrest for sex offenses; it was the first from Epstein to MIT. Minsky received no further research grants from him.

Minsky organized two academic symposia on Epstein's private island Little Saint James, one in 2002 and another in 2011, after Epstein was a registered sex offender. Virginia Roberts Giuffre said Epstein sent her to have sex with Minsky; Minsky's widow, Gloria Rudisch, has denied this.

=== Death ===
Minsky died in Boston, Massachusetts on January 24, 2016, aged 88. His family reported that he died of a cerebral hemorrhage. Minsky was a member of Alcor Life Extension Foundation's Scientific Advisory Board. Alcor will neither confirm nor deny that Minsky was cryonically preserved.

== See also ==
- List of pioneers in computer science
