= John Giannandrea =

Scottish software engineer and businessman (Born 1964/1965)

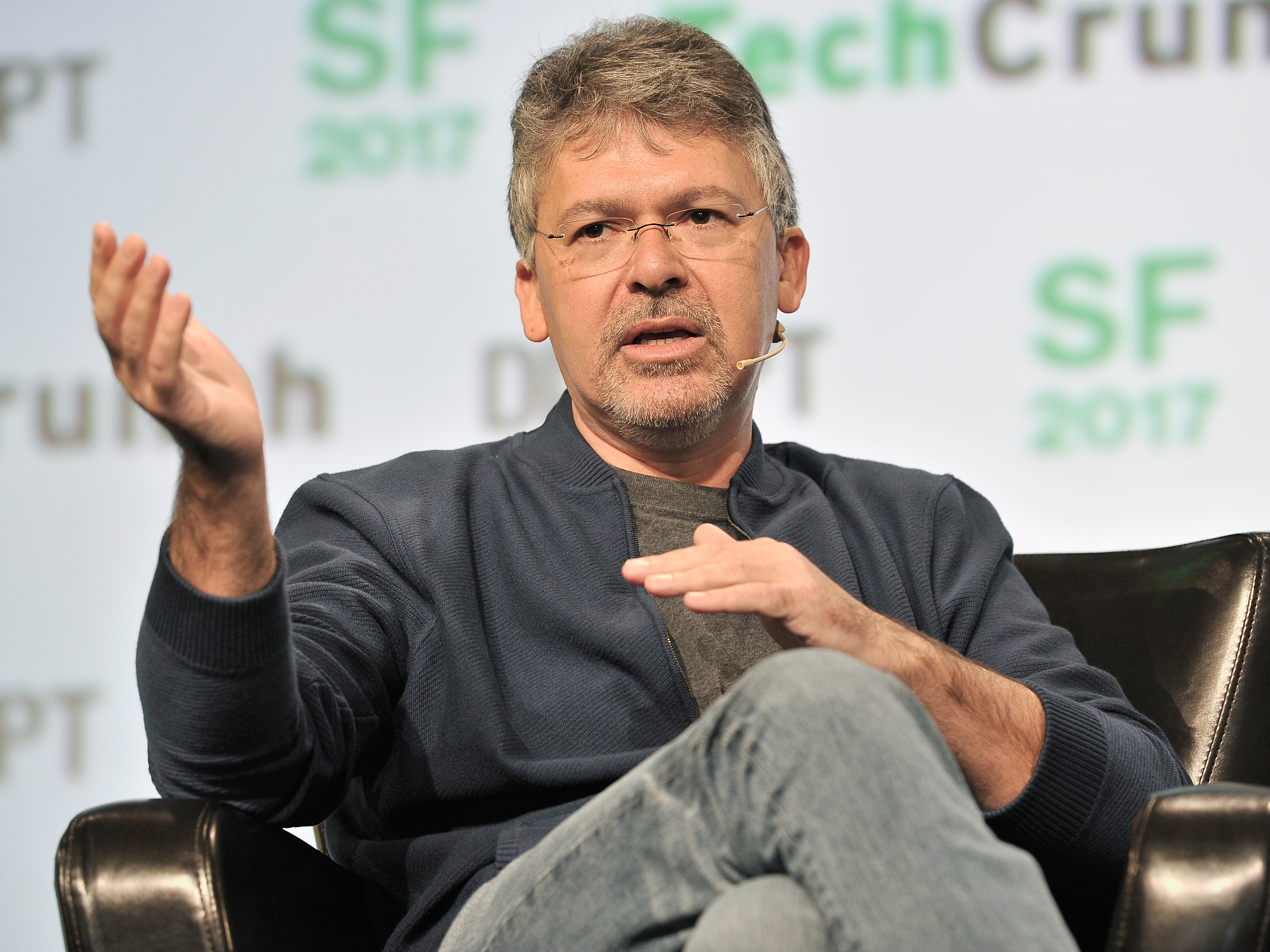
- Giannandrea in 2017
- Born: 1964 or 1965 (age 60–61); Bridge of Allan, Scotland, United Kingdom

John Giannandrea is a British software engineer and technology executive. He co-founded Metaweb and previously served in senior engineering roles at Tellme Networks, Netscape, and General Magic. Giannandrea joined Google in 2010 and later became the company’s chief of search and artificial intelligence.

In 2018, Giannandrea moved to Apple Inc, where he was appointed senior vice president of machine learning and AI strategy. He remained in that role until his departure was announced in late 2025, with retirement effective in early 2026.

== Career ==
Giannandrea co-founded Metaweb, led Google Search and artificial intelligence, was co-founder and CTO of the speech recognition company Tellme Networks, chief technologist of the web browser group at Netscape, and senior engineer at General Magic. He subsequently worked at Google, rising to become their chief of search and artificial intelligence.

In 2018, Giannandrea left Google to join Apple Inc. He was appointed as senior vice president of machine learning and artificial intelligence strategy at Apple, one of 16 executives reporting directly to CEO Tim Cook. The department was rumored to have the most involvement with the later cancelled Apple electric car project. In March 2025, Giannandrea was reportedly ousted as the head of Siri development. In December 2025, Apple announced that Giannandrea would retire from the company effective early 2026.
