= Kynamatrix Research Network =

American nonprofit research network

Kynamatrix Research Network is a nonprofit network of researchers dedicated to the scientific understanding and advancement of interactive communication. One of the programs includes a project called "ResearchHDiscovery," launched in April 2007—"Through two-way high-definition communication, research meets discovery." As a proof-of-concept for collaborative one-on-one research using two-way high definition, this project connects multiple universities in the United States enabling researchers to work and innovate in new ways. Participating universities include Carnegie Mellon University, Georgia Institute of Technology, Harvard University, MIT Media Lab, Stanford University, and University of Washington. The experience opens virtual windows between university labs connecting professors, researchers, and colleagues so they can regularly brainstorm, develop and review inter-university graduate programs, and manage relationships with students and advisors. The goal of the project is to increase innovation through collaboration.
