= Steve Lawrence (computer scientist) =

Australian computer scientist

Steve Lawrence is an Australian computer scientist. He was among the group at NEC Research which was responsible for the creation of the Search Engine/Digital Library CiteSeer. He was an employee at Google. He is currently a co-founder & CTO at Xoo.

Lawrence received Bachelor of Science and Bachelor of Engineering degrees from Queensland University of Technology in Australia, and his PhD from the University of Queensland in Australia.

He became a senior research scientist at NEC Research Institute.

He was a senior research scientist at Google where he developed Google Desktop.

Lawrence's professional service includes being program committee co-chair for WWW 2003, program committee vice chair for WWW 2002, co-chair for workshops at AAAI and WWW, a program committee member for conferences including WWW, CIKM, and NIPS, and a reviewer for many journals including Science and Nature.

Lawrence's research interests include information retrieval, digital libraries, and machine learning. He has published over 50 papers in these areas, including articles in Science, Nature, CACM, and IEEE Computer. He has been interviewed by over 100 news organizations including the New York Times, the Wall Street Journal, Washington Post, Reuters, Associated Press, CNN, MSNBC, the BBC, and NPR. Hundreds of articles about his research have appeared worldwide in over 10 different languages.

== Awards and honors ==
- NEC Research Institute Excellence awards
- NEC Research Impact awards
- Queensland University of Technology university medal and award for excellence
- ATERB scholarship
- APRA priority scholarship,
- Technology NJ Internet Innovator award
- QEC and Telecom Australia Engineering prizes,
- Three prizes in the Australian Mathematics Competition.
