= Stephen Laurence =

British philosopher

Philosophical work
- Era: Contemporary philosophy
- Region: Western Philosophy
- School: Analytic philosophy
- Main interests: Philosophy of language, philosophy of mind, cognitive science

Stephen Laurence is a scientist and philosopher, currently Professor at the University of Sheffield, whose primary areas of research interest are the philosophy of mind, the philosophy of language, and cognitive science.

He was Director of the Innateness and the Structure of the Mind Project, an interdisciplinary inquiry into nativist theorizing funded by the Arts & Humanities Research Council.

He is also director of the Hang Seng Centre for Cognitive Studies.

== See also ==
- Interdisciplinarity
- Nativist theorizing
