= NEC Corporation of America =

American computer company

- Company type: Subsidiary
- Industry: Electronics, information technology, telecommunications
- Founded: July 1, 2006; 19 years ago
- Headquarters: Irving, Texas, United States
- Area served: United States
- Parent: NEC
- Subsidiaries: NEC Information Analytical Group (IAG); NEC Laboratories America; NEC Financial Services
- Website: www.necam.com

NEC Corporation of America (NECAM) is the principal subsidiary of the multinational IT company NEC in the United States.

NEC Corporation of America was formed on July 1, 2006, from the combined operations of NEC America, NEC Solutions (America) and NEC USA.

== History ==
=== NEC America Inc. ===
NEC America Inc, originally known as Nippon Electric New York, was incorporated in 1963.

=== NEC Home Electronics (USA), Inc. ===
NEC Home Electronics (USA), Inc. was established in October 1981.

=== HNSX Supercomputers ===
In October 1986, NEC formed a joint venture with Honeywell, HNSX Supercomputers, to sell NEC's supercomputers in the United States and Canada. In October 1989, Honeywell agreed to sell its share in HNSX Supercomputers to NEC.

In April 1997 HNSX Supercomputers and Fujitsu were jointly found guilty of dumping by bidding below cost in order to sell a supercomputer to the National Center for Atmospheric Research. In September 1997 the United States International Trade Commission found that Cray had been financially injured by the pricing practices of HNSX Supercomputers and Fujitsu. Cray later took over the operations of HNSX, and acquired rights to sell NEC supercomputers in the US, in February 2001.

=== NEC Research Institute ===
NEC established its US research lab, NEC Research Institute in South Brunswick, Princeton, New Jersey in 1988.

=== NEC Technologies, Inc. ===
In November 1989, NEC announced that it would merge NEC Home Electronics (USA) with NEC Information Systems, Inc. to form NEC Technologies, Inc.

=== NEC Laboratories America ===
NEC Laboratories America was created in November 2002 through the merger of NEC Research Institute and NEC USA's Computer and Communications Research Laboratory. NEC Laboratories succeeded in sending over 100 terabits of information per second through a single optical fibre in April 2011, establishing a new world record.

=== NEC Solutions (America), Inc. ===
On April 1, 2002, NEC announced that NEC Technologies, Inc. would be merged with NEC Computers Inc. and NEC Systems, Inc. to form NEC Solutions (America), Inc.

=== NEC Corporation of America ===
NEC Corporation of America was formed on July 1, 2006, from the combined operations of NEC America, NEC Solutions (America) and NEC USA.

== Operations ==
Subsidiaries of NEC Corporation of America include:

- NEC Laboratories America – a research facility based in Princeton, NJ focused on technology research and early market validation.
- NEC Financial Services, LLC. – a company which offers financing services supporting the sale of products to businesses in the United States.

== Products and services ==
NEC Corporation of America's products and services include:

- automated fingerprint identification systems
- carrier professional services
- document solutions equipment
- enterprise communications equipment
- enterprise content management
- openflow networking equipment
- identity management
- leasing and financial services
- microwave radio equipment
- optical networking equipment
- Business Intelligence, Corporate Performance Management
- Data warehousing, Master Data Management
- Predictive Analytic services, Big Data
- retail applications
- servers
- software
- storage equipment

== See also ==
- Mitsubishi Electric United States
