= Fred Kavli =

Norwegian-American businessman and philanthropist (1927–2013)

- Born: August 20, 1927; Eresfjord, Norway
- Died: November 21, 2013 (aged 86); Santa Barbara, California, U.S.
- Education: Norwegian Institute of Technology
- Known for: Business leader, innovator, and philanthropist.
- Title: Founder and Chairman, The Kavli Foundation

Fred Kavli (August 20, 1927 – November 21, 2013) was a Norwegian-American businessman and philanthropist born on a small farm in Eresfjord, Norway. He founded the Kavlico Corporation in Moorpark, California. Under his leadership, Kavlico became one of the world's largest suppliers of sensors for aeronautic, automotive, and industrial applications supplying General Electric and the Ford Motor Company.

In 2000 he established The Kavli Foundation to "advance science for the benefit of humanity and to promote public understanding and support for scientists and their work". The foundation's mission is implemented through an international program of research institutes, professorships, and symposia in the scientific fields of astrophysics, nanoscience, neuroscience, and theoretical physics. The foundation awards the Kavli Prize in astrophysics, nanoscience, and neuroscience.

Kavli was featured in the media primarily for his philanthropic efforts.

== Kavli's life and career ==
Born in 1927, Kavli grew up on the family farm in the Norwegian village of Eresfjord (pop. 450).

At 14, together with his brother Aslak, he began his first enterprise creating wood pellet fuel for cars. This was during the Second World War and the Nazi occupation of Norway.

Inspired by his father's 13 years in San Francisco the young Kavli wanted to move to the US. Three days after he received his engineering degree from the Norwegian Institute of Technology (NTH) in Trondheim he left for America on the SS Stavangerfjord.

Having no sponsor or job waiting for him, his visa application was initially rejected, so in 1955 he immigrated to Montreal, Quebec, Canada instead. The following year his visa was approved and he moved to the United States. He found work as an engineer for a Los Angeles business that developed feedback flight controls for Atlas missiles. He would rise to the position of Chief Engineer there.

Looking to start his own business he advertised in the Los Angeles Times, soliciting investors with the simple but effective text "Engineer seeking financial backing to start own business".

Two years later he founded the Kavlico Corporation, located in Moorpark, California. Under his leadership, the company became one of the world's largest suppliers of pressure sensors for aeronautic, automotive, and industrial applications supplying amongst others General Electric and the Ford Motor Company.

In 2000, he sold Kavlico for $345 million to C-Mac Industries Inc, later acquired by the French company Schneider Electric. Much of Kavli's wealth was a result of his real estate investments in Southern California. As a philanthropist, Kavli subsequently established The Kavli Foundation and dedicated much of his wealth to funding research institutions and programs worldwide.

On June 19, 2006, he was appointed Grand Officer, Commander with Star, of the Royal Norwegian Order of Merit by King Harald V of Norway in recognition of his work on behalf of Norway and humanity. In 2008, he was also awarded an honorary doctorate, Doctor Honoris Causa, by the Norwegian University of Science and Technology, in recognition of his work to the benefit and advancement of science and research.

Kavli was a Fellow of the American Academy of Arts and Sciences. He was also a former member of the U.S. President's Council of Advisors on Science and Technology, and former member of the University of California President's Board on Science and Innovation.

In 2009, Mr. Kavli received an honorary Doctor of Science degree from Northwestern University. In 2011, he received the Bower Award for Business Leadership from the Franklin Institute, one of the oldest science education centers in the United States, and the Carnegie Medal of Philanthropy, which is given biennially to one or more individuals who, like Andrew Carnegie, have dedicated their private wealth to the public good, and who have sustained impressive careers as philanthropists. Also, in 2011, Mr. Kavli was conferred the degree of doctor philosopliae honoris causa by the University of Oslo.

A Trustee of the University of California, Santa Barbara (UCSB) Foundation, in addition to supporting scientific research and education, his philanthropic activities included the Fred Kavli Theatre for Performing Arts at the Thousand Oaks Civic Arts Plaza, California, as well as other projects.

Kavli was divorced and had two grown children.

On November 21, 2013, Kavli died at his Santa Barbara, California home after surgery for cholangiocarcinoma, a rare form of cancer.

== Kavli Prizes ==
Through The Kavli Foundation, Kavli established scientific prizes in the fields of Astrophysics, Nanoscience, and Neuroscience. The Kavli Prizes are presented in cooperation with the Norwegian Academy of Science and Letters and the Norwegian Ministry of Education and Research, and have been awarded biennially at a ceremony in Oslo since 2008. Each prize consists of a scroll, gold medal, and $1,000,000 cash.

Kavli chose to focus on these three areas of interest – "from the biggest, to the smallest, to the most complex" – because he thinks these fields are the most exciting scientific fields for the 21st century with potentially great benefits. Kavli has also noted his intent that the Prizes distinguish themselves from the Nobel prizes in science. Consequently, one key distinction between the prizes: Kavli Prize laureates are selected by committees composed of distinguished international scientists. These committee members are recommended by the Chinese Academy of Sciences, the French Academy of Sciences, the Max Planck Society, the U.S. National Academy of Sciences and The Royal Society, with committee chairs chosen by the Norwegian Academy of Science and Letters.

The first Kavli Prize winners were announced on May 28, 2008, simultaneously in Oslo and at the opening of the World Science Festival in New York City. The first Kavli Prize for astrophysics was awarded to Maarten Schmidt and Donald Lynden-Bell. Louis E. Brus and Sumio Iijima shared the nanoscience prize, while Pasko Rakic, Thomas Jessell and Sten Grillner were awarded the neuroscience prize. The four US winners of the Kavli Prize were honored by President George W. Bush and Science Advisor, Dr. John Marburger, at an Oval Office reception in the White House on November 12, 2008. (See Kavli Prize for laureates in subsequent years.)

== The Kavli Foundation ==
The Kavli Foundation, based in Oxnard, California, is dedicated to the goals of advancing science for the benefit of humanity and to promote public understanding and support for scientists and their work. It was established in 2000 by Mr. Kavli and is actively involved in establishing major research institutes at leading universities and institutions in the United States, Europe and Asia.

The Kavli Foundation has made grants to establish Kavli Institutes on the campuses of the University of California, Santa Barbara, University of California Berkeley, Stanford University, California Institute of Technology, the University of Chicago, Columbia University, Yale University, New York University, Cornell University, the University of California, San Diego, Delft University of Technology in The Netherlands, the Massachusetts Institute of Technology, Peking University, Chinese Academy of Sciences, Harvard University, University of Cambridge and the Norwegian University of Science and Technology. These institutions are the beneficiaries of the Kavli Foundation to date, and the list is bound to grow in the future.

In addition to the Kavli Institutes, six Kavli professorships have been established: two at the University of California Santa Barbara, one at the University of California Los Angeles, one at the University of California Irvine, one at Columbia University, and one at the California Institute of Technology.

== Kavli Institutes ==
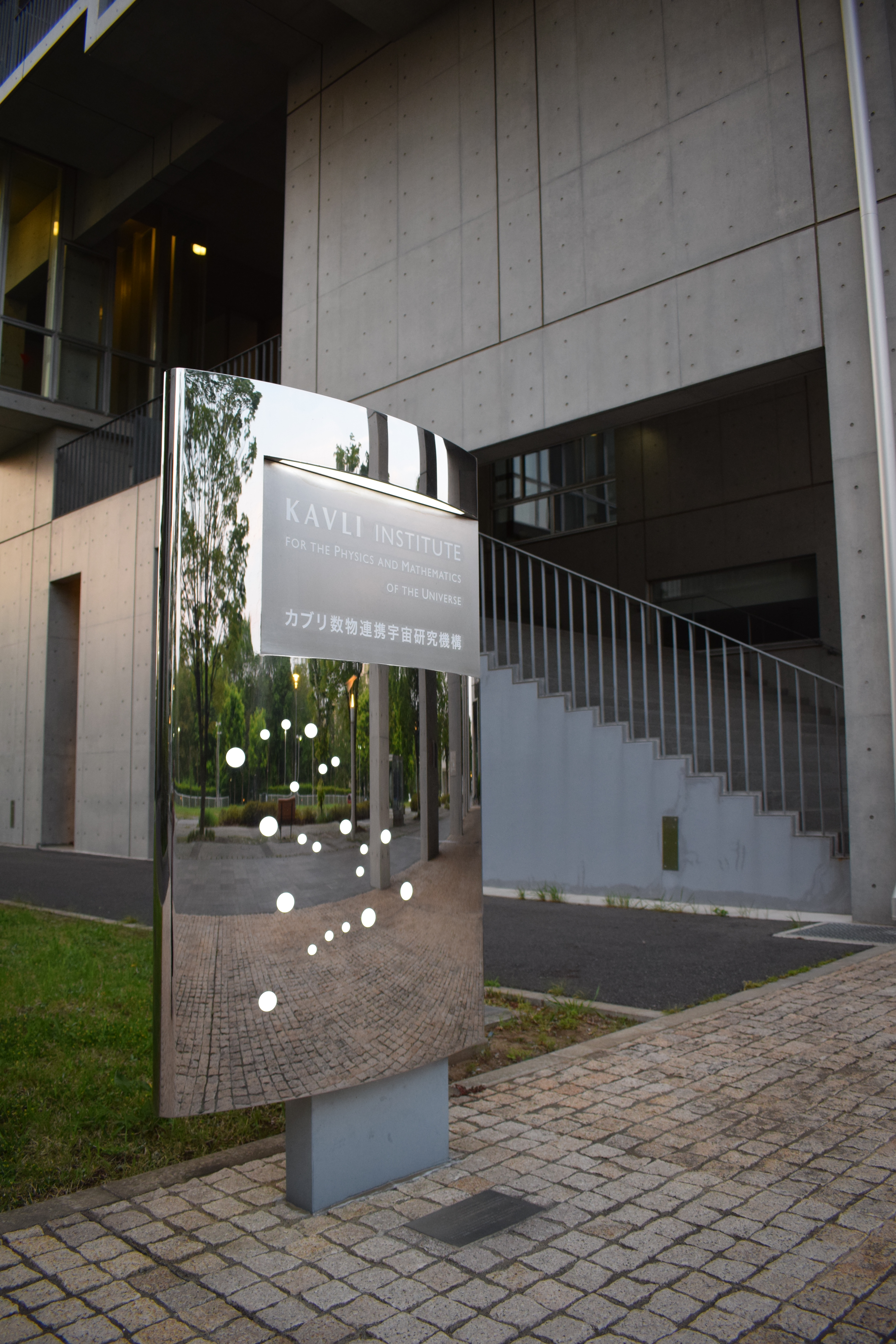
KAVLI Institute for the Physics and Mathematics of the Universe, in Japan

The Kavli Foundation has established 20 research institutes at leading universities worldwide. These institutes focus on astrophysics, nanoscience, neuroscience and theoretical physics. Consistent with its business-like approach, Kavli requires each partner University to match the average $7.5 million donation. The institutes are not required to focus on any specific subject but are free to do any basic research they see fit.

Seven researchers associated with the Kavli institutes have been awarded Nobel Prizes: David Gross, Frank Wilczek, Richard Axel, Eric Kandel, Edvard Moser, May-Britt Moser and Rainer Weiss.

As of October 2023, there are 13 institutes in the United States, 2 in China, 1 in the Netherlands, 1 in Norway, 2 in the United Kingdom, and 1 in Japan.

The 20 Kavli Institutes are:

=== Astrophysics ===
- The Kavli Institute for Particle Astrophysics and Cosmology at Stanford University
- The Kavli Institute for Cosmological Physics, University of Chicago
- The Kavli Institute for Astrophysics and Space Research at the Massachusetts Institute of Technology
- The Kavli Institute for Astronomy and Astrophysics at Peking University
- The Kavli Institute for Cosmology at the University of Cambridge
- The Kavli Institute for the Physics and Mathematics of the Universe at the University of Tokyo

=== Nanoscience ===
- The Kavli Institute for Nanoscale Science at Cornell University
- The Kavli Institute of Nanoscience at Delft University of Technology in the Netherlands
- The Kavli Nanoscience Institute at the California Institute of Technology
- The Kavli Energy NanoSciences Institute at University of California, Berkeley and the Lawrence Berkeley National Laboratory
- The Kavli Institute for NanoScience Discovery at the University of Oxford

=== Neuroscience ===
- The Kavli Institute for Brain Science at Columbia University
- The Kavli Institute for Brain & Mind at the University of California, San Diego
- The Kavli Institute for Neuroscience at Yale University
- The Kavli Institute for Systems Neuroscience at the Norwegian University of Science and Technology
- The Kavli Neuroscience Discovery Institute at Johns Hopkins University
- The Kavli Neural Systems Institute at The Rockefeller University
- The Kavli Institute for Fundamental Neuroscience at the University of California, San Francisco

=== Theoretical physics ===
- Kavli Institute for Theoretical Physics at the University of California, Santa Barbara
- The Kavli Institute for Theoretical Sciences (KITS) at the University of Chinese Academy of Sciences

== Honours ==
- Royal Norwegian Order of Merit - Grand Officer.
- Norwegian Academy of Technological Sciences – fellow.
- Norwegian University of Science and Technology – honorary doctor.

== Quotes ==
The curiosity of the human being is what has brought us where we are today, and I have complete confidence that it will take us where we need to be in the future.
