= Audrey van der Meer =

Neuroscientist

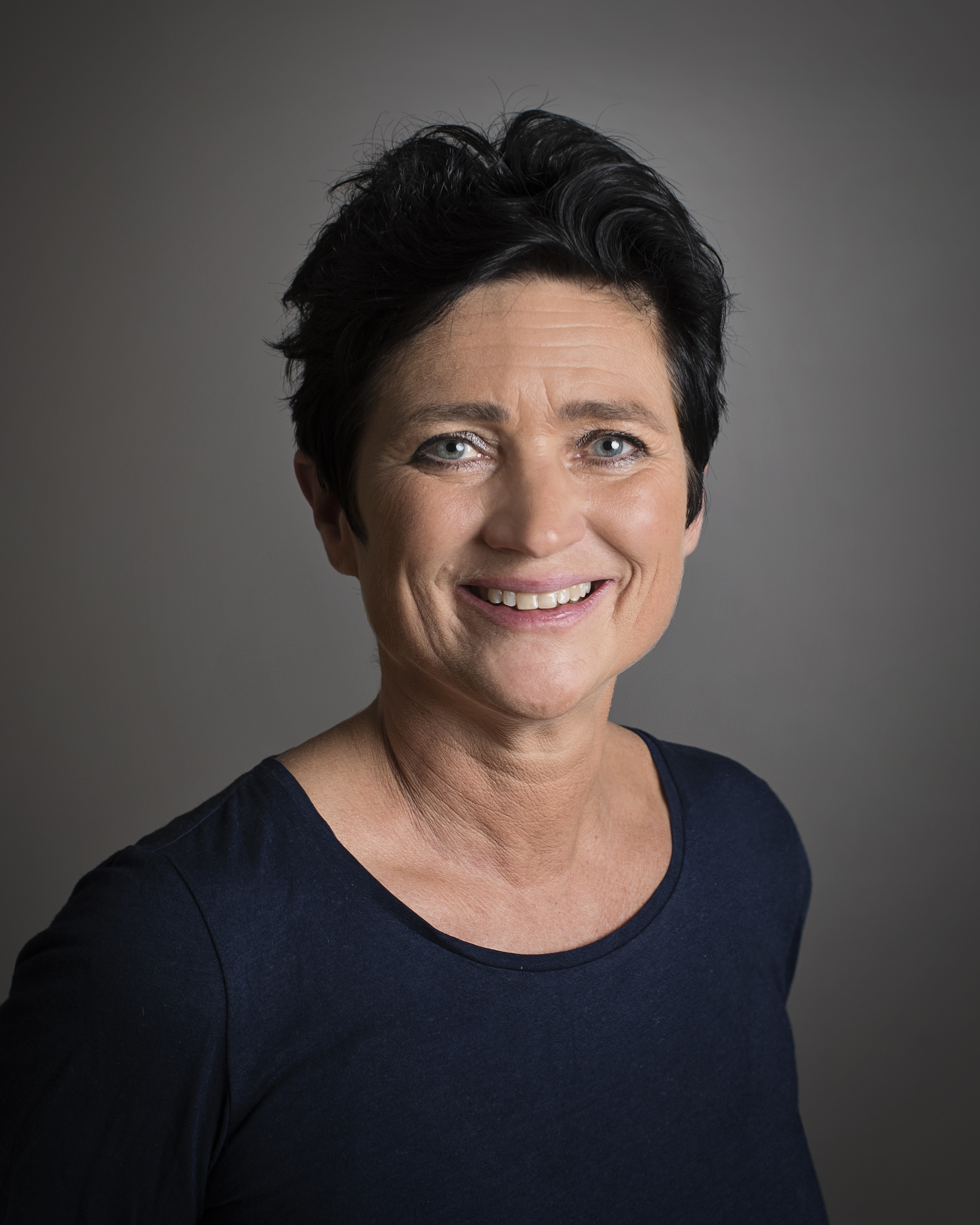
Audrey van der Meer, brain researcher at NTNU, Norway

Audrey van der Meer (born 1 October 1966) is a Dutch-born Norwegian neuroscientist and Professor of Neuropsychology at the Department of Psychology at the Norwegian University of Science and Technology (NTNU). With her husband, Professor of Cognitive Psychology Ruud van der Weel, she directs the Developmental Neuroscience Laboratory at NTNU. Her research seeks to understand the underlying principles that guide development, learning, and cognitive ageing. She joined the psychology department at NTNU in 1996, in the same year fellow neuroscientists Edvard Moser and May-Britt Moser joined the department; in 1997 she was promoted to full professor of neuroscience. She was part of the Section for Biological Psychology headed by Edvard Moser, but had her own research group. She is a member of the Royal Norwegian Society of Sciences and Letters. She also believes that "national guidelines should be put into place to ensure that children receive at least a minimum of handwriting training."
