= Hsiao-Mei Cho =

Observational cosmologist

Hsiao-Mei (Sherry) Cho is a solid state physicist who works as a lead scientist at the SLAC National Accelerator Laboratory in California. Her research involves the development of superconducting quantum sensors and instruments to measure cosmological phenomena including dark matter and the polarization of the cosmic microwave background.

== Education and career ==
Cho has a Ph.D. from the University of Houston, with Paul Ching Wu Chu as her advisor, but her doctoral research was primarily performed at the University of California, Berkeley under the supervision of John Clarke. After postdoctoral research at Berkeley, in the group of William Holzapfel, she became a researcher for the National Institute of Standards and Technology in 2007. Her research there included both astrophysical and terrestrial application of microwave sensors; while at NIST, she also held an affiliation at the University of Colorado Boulder. She subsequently moved to SLAC; she is also affiliated with the Kavli Institute for Particle Astrophysics and Cosmology, a joint laboratory of SLAC and Stanford University.

== Recognition ==
Cho was elected as a Fellow of the American Physical Society (APS) in 2015, after a nomination from the APS Group on Instrument and Measurement Science, "for outstanding contributions to the development of sensitive bolometers and superconducting amplifiers, and leadership in their application to the measurement of the polarization of the cosmic microwave background".
