= Joslynn Lee =

Native American biochemist

Joslynn Lee is a Native American biochemist and an assistant professor at Fort Lewis College in Durango, Colorado whose research focuses on computational biology and molecular modeling. She advocates for indigenous students and established major institutional changes by inspiring a deconstruction of offensive plaques that white-washed the history of violence and ethnocide toward Native students on the college's land.

== Early life ==
Lee grew up in Farmington, New Mexico. She is Native American, identifying as Navajo, Laguna Pueblo, and Acoma Pueblo. When she was young, her grandmother would pick plants to make natural dyes which later inspired Lee to connect her native heritage with science.

== Career ==
In 2014, Joslynn Lee received a Ph.D. in chemistry from Northeastern University and then worked briefly as a postdoctoral researcher at the University of Minnesota Medical School, during which she worked with faculty to analyze their sequencing data. In 2015, she took up a position as a data science educator at Cold Spring Harbor Laboratory. There, she trained undergraduates to incorporate computational biology and chemistry into their curricula, visiting institutions throughout the United States to train their faculty how to implement her curriculum. Later she joined the Howard Hughes Medical Institute in order to develop an undergraduate research for analyzing microbial communities.

In Fall 2019, Joslynn Lee became a chemistry professor at Fort Lewis College. In the same year, she launched the Monitoring Environmental Microbiome program which focused on the mining impacts on the San Juan Watershed, hoping to encourage Native American and underrepresented students to explore data science and scientific computing. Lee encourages the use of indigenous languages such as her own, Diné, in the classroom in order to create a safe space for other Native students. She identifies with the six percent of indigenous faculty employed at Fort Lewis, despite almost over half of students also having native ancestors. She also runs the Fort Lewis Equity Group that was launched in 2022 with a $25,000 grant.

== Legacy and impact ==
Joslynn Lee is the first Native American to become a chemistry professor at Fort Lewis College. When she began her faculty position, Lee wrote letters to Fort Lewis College's president, Tom Stritikus, advocating for the removal of the historical markers on a clock tower at the center of campus. The markers were inscribed with inaccurate information on the history of the college's past as a previous Native American boarding school. In response to Lee's efforts, the school's administration held over a year of listening sessions before removing them on September 6th, 2021.

== Publications ==
- Bolyen, E.; Rideout, J.R.; Dillon, M.R.; Bokulich, N.A.; Abnet, C.; Al-Ghalith, G.A.; Alexander, H.; Alm, E.J.; Arumugam, M.; Asnicar, F.; et al. (2019) Reproducible, interactive, scalable and extensible microbiome data science using QIIME 2. doi:10.1038/s41587-019-0209-9. PMID 31341288 S2CID 198496880
- Bolyen E, Rideout JR, Dillon MR, Bokulich NA, Abnet CC, Al-Ghalith GA, Alexander H, Alm EJ, Arumugam M, Asnicar F,; et al. (2019) Author Correction: Reproducible, interactive, scalable and extensible microbiome data science using QIIME 2. Nat Biotechnol. Erratum for: Nat Biotechnol. 2019 Aug;37(8):852-857. doi: 10.1038/s41587-019-0252-6. PMID: 31399723. S2CID 199519152
- Lacher, S.E., Lee, J.S., Wang, X., Campbell, M.R., Bell, D.A., & Slattery, M. (2015). Beyond antioxidant genes in the ancient Nrf2 regulatory network. Free radical biology & medicine, 88 Pt B, 452-465 . doi:10.1016/j.freeradbiomed.2015.06.044. PMID 26163000 S2CID 13781789
- Zhang, Y., Lee, J.K., Toso, E.A., Lee, J.S., Choi S.H., Slattery, M.G., Aihara, H., Kyba, M. (2016). DNA-binding sequence specificity of DUX4. Skelet Muscle 6(8). doi:10.1186/s13395-016-0080-z. PMID 26823969 S2CID 3514854
- Parasuram, R., Lee, J. S., Yin, P., Somarowthu, S., Ondrechen, MJ. (2010) Functional Classification of Protein 3D Structures From Predicted Local Interaction Sites. Journal of Bioinformatics and Computational Biology. 8, SI1, 1-15. doi:10.1142/s0219720010005166. PMID 21155016 S2CID 20328014

== Awards and recognition ==
Joslynn Lee was awarded the 2023 National Science Foundation Graduate Research Fellowship. Lee was also selected as a Kavli Frontiers in Science fellow, which provides career development for potential leaders in science.
