= Steven Kahn =

American physicist

Steven M. Kahn
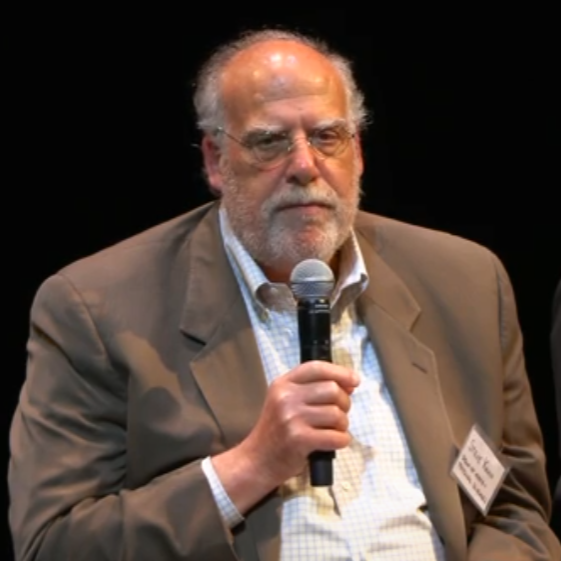
- Born: 1954 (age 71–72)
- Education: University of California, Berkeley
- Scientific career
- Fields: Physics
- Workplaces: Stanford University University of California, Berkeley, Kavli Institute for Particle Astrophysics and Cosmology
- Thesis: Soft X-ray Spectral and Temporal Properties of Galactic Sources (1980)

Steven Michael Kahn (born 1954) is an American physicist and professor of Physics and Astronomy at the University of California, Berkeley, formerly the I. I. Rabi Professor of Physics at Columbia University and an Elected Fellow of the American Academy of Arts and Sciences and American Physical Society.

Kahn graduated summa cum laude from Columbia College in 1975, and received a PhD in physics from Berkeley in 1980. He was a post-doctoral fellow at the Center for Astrophysics | Harvard & Smithsonian from 1980 to 1982.

== Honors ==
Asteroid 179413 Stevekahn, discovered by astronomers with the Sloan Digital Sky Survey in 2001, was named in his honor. The official naming citation was published by IAU's WGSBN on February 7, 2022.
