= Tom Abel (cosmologist) =

German cosmologist (born 1970)

- Born: 1970 (age 55–56); Lower Bavaria, Germany
- Education: University of Regensburg (MS, 1998); LMU Munich (PhD, 2000)
- Scientific career
- Fields: Cosmology
- Workplaces: Stanford University
- Thesis: The First Structures in the Universe, A Theoretical Study of their Formation, Evolution and Impact on Subsequent Structure Formation (1999)
- Doctoral advisor: Simon White

Tom Abel (born 1970) is a German cosmologist who first simulated the collapse of a metal-free massive star that belongs to the first generation of stars in the Universe. This work was done in collaboration with Greg L. Bryan and Michael L. Norman and was published in Science magazine (2002, 295, 93). He received his Doctor of Philosophy from LMU Munich in 2000.

He is a Professor of Physics at Stanford University in Palo Alto, California and of Particle Physics and Astrophysics at SLAC National Accelerator Laboratory and from 2013 to 2018 served as Director of the Kavli Institute for Particle Astrophysics and Cosmology.

His work with visualization expert Ralf Kaehler has been seen in many planetaria shows including "The Dark Universe" (2013)

== Background ==
Abel was born in rural Lower Bavaria, Germany.

== Work ==
His primary interests are:

- Primordial star formation
- Cosmological structure formation and reionization
- Astrophysical fluid dynamics
- Radiative transfer

== Honors and awards ==
- Elected a Fellow of the American Association for the Advancement of Science (AAAS) in 2014
