= Hitoshi Murayama =

Japanese physicist

- Murayama in 2026
- Born: March 21, 1964 (age 62); Tokyo
- Education: University of Tokyo
- Known for: Particle Physics, Cosmology
- Scientific career
- Workplaces: UC Berkeley; Kavli Institute for the Physics and Mathematics of the Universe, University of Tokyo

Hitoshi Murayama (村山 斉, Murayama Hitoshi; 21 March 1964 -) is a Japanese-born physicist with notable contributions in the fields of particle physics and cosmology. He is currently a professor at the Center for Theoretical Physics at the University of California, Berkeley, and was the Director of the Kavli Institute for the Physics and Mathematics of the Universe at the University of Tokyo.

== Biography ==
Born in Japan in 1964, Murayama obtained his B.Sc. in Physics from the University of Tokyo in 1986. He completed his Ph.D. in Tokyo in 1991. In 1993, he moved to the US to join the Lawrence Berkeley National Laboratory as a post-doctoral research fellow. In 1995, he was appointed as an associate professor in University of California, Berkeley, where he became a full professor of physics in 2000. He is the founding director of the Kavli Institute for the Physics and Mathematics of the Universe (Kavli IPMU) at the University of Tokyo since 2007. In addition, he has been a visiting scientist at CERN since 2016.

In 2013, he was elected to the American Academy of Arts and Sciences and was chosen as a fellow of the American Physical Society. In October 2014, he delivered an invited lecture titled "Science for Peace and Development" at the Headquarters of the United Nations in an event honoring the 60th anniversary of CERN.

== Scientific Work ==
Professor Murayama is involved in the KamLAND neutrino experiment at the Kamioka Observatory, an underground neutrino detection facility near Toyama, Japan. The KamLAND collaboration won the Breakthrough Prize in Fundamental Physics in 2016.

In 1998, Murayama, Gian Giudice, Markus Luty and Riccardo Rattazzi discovered "anomaly mediated supersymmetry breaking, a subtle quantum mechanical mechanism which contributes to the gaugino masses in supergravity".

== Awards and honors ==
- Humboldt Prize (2018)
- Breakthrough Prize in Fundamental Physics, as a member of the KamLAND collaboration
- Nishinomiya Yukawa Commemoration Prize in Theoretical Physics
- Fellow of American Physical Society
- Member of Science Council of Japan
- Member of American Academy of Arts and Sciences
- Sloan Research Fellowship
- David Saxon Lecture 2012 (UCLA)
- Julius Edgar Lilienfeld Prize (2026)
