= Kavli Institute for Cosmology =

Research institute at the University of Cambridge

Kavli Institute for Cosmology, Cambridge
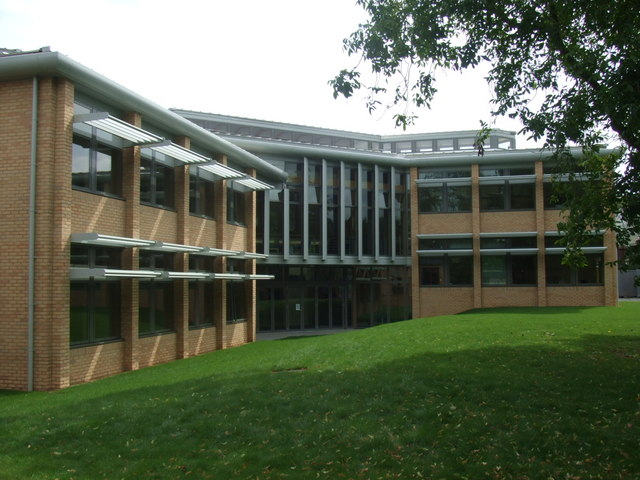
- Established: 2006
- Director: Anthony Challinor
- Faculty: School of Physical Sciences, University of Cambridge
- Staff: 48
- Address: Madingley Road
- Location: Cambridge, Cambridgeshire, United Kingdom
- Website: www.kicc.cam.ac.uk

The Kavli Institute for Cosmology, Cambridge (KICC) is a research establishment set up through collaboration of the University of Cambridge and the Kavli Foundation. It is operated by two of the University's astronomy groups: the Institute of Astronomy (IoA) and the Cavendish Astrophysics Group.

== Background ==
In August 2006, an agreement was reached between the University of Cambridge and the Kavli Foundation for the establishment of an Institute for cosmology. The Kavli Foundation will support several 5-year senior research fellowships in perpetuity, and the University committed to provide a building to house the Institute. Operation began in October 2008 with the appointment of the first Kavli Institute Fellows. The building was completed in July 2009, and was officially opened 18 November 2009 by Prince Philip as Chancellor of the University in a ceremony with Fred Kavli.

The current director of the Institute is Anthony Challinor, and the deputy director is Debora Sijacki. The first director was George Efstathiou of the IoA, succeeded by Roberto Maiolino.

== Projects ==
KICC researchers are involved in the following projects:

- Atacama Large Millimeter Array
- Dark Energy Survey
- Dark Energy Spectroscopic Instrument
- Extremely Large Telescope
- Illustris project
- James Webb Space Telescope
- KLEVER (Kmos LEnsed Velocity and Emission line Review)
- Large Synoptic Survey Telescope
- MaNGA sky survey
- MOONS galaxy survey
- Planck cosmological survey
- Square Kilometre Array
- Simons Observatory

== Kavli Building ==
The Kavli Building is located adjacent to the Hoyle Building, the main building of the IoA. The two are connected by a raised walkway. The building was designed to encourage the occupants to interact with one another as well as with the occupants of the Hoyle building. It is intended to be similar in architectural style to the Hoyle Building, but to be sufficiently distinctive so as to retain an independent identity. The architects were Annand and Mustoe. The design includes use of ground source heat pumps and a heat exchanger serving under-floor heating to meet City Council requirements that at least 10% of the building's energy is generated on-site.

== Kavli Fellowships ==
The Kavli Institute offers every year a number of prestigious Kavli Fellowships intended for outstanding young scientists early in their careers. Most of the previous Kavli Fellows are now research leaders around the world.
