= Toshiyuki Kobayashi =

Japanese mathematician

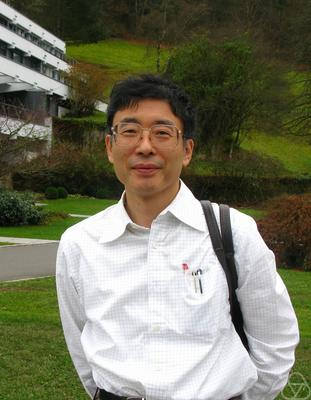
Toshiyuki Kobayashi

Toshiyuki Kobayashi (小林 俊行, Kobayashi Toshiyuki; born September 9, 1962) is a Japanese mathematician known for his original work in the field of Lie theory, and in particular for the theory of discontinuous groups (lattice in Lie groups) and the application of geometric analysis to representation theory. He was a major developer in particular of the theory of discontinuous groups for non-Riemannian homogeneous spaces and the theory of discrete breaking symmetry in unitary representation theory.

He has been a member of the Science Council of Japan since 2006, Board of Trustees of the Mathematical Society of Japan (2003–2007), the Editor in Chief of the Journal of the Mathematical Society of Japan (2002–2006), and currently is the Managing Editor of the Japanese Journal of Mathematics since 2006.

== Academic career ==
- Ph.D./Doctor of Science, 1990, University of Tokyo
- Assistant Professor, 1987–1991, Associate Professor, 1991–2001, University of Tokyo
- Associate Professor, 2001–2003, RIMS, Kyoto University
- Full Professor, 2003–2007, RIMS, Kyoto University
- Full Professor, 2007-, University of Tokyo
- Principal Investigator, 2011-, Kavli Institute for the Physics and Mathematics of the Universe (IPMU)

He has held many invited positions including Institute for Advanced Study in Princeton, USA (1991–1992), Mittag-Leffler Institute, Sweden (1995–1996), Université de Paris, Université de Paris VI, France (1999), Harvard University, USA (2000–2001, 2008), Université de Paris VII, France (2003), Max-Planck-Institut für Mathematik in Bonn, Germany (2007), IHES, France (2010; 2012; 2014; 2015; 2017; 2019; 2023; 2025), Jubilee Professorship, Chalmers University, Sweden (2013) and Yale University (2019)

== Awards and honors ==
- 1997 - Takebe Prize, The Mathematical Society of Japan
- 1999 - Spring Prize, The Mathematical Society of Japan
- 2006 - Osaka Science Prize
- 2006/2007 - Sackler Distinguished Lecturer
- 2007 - JSPS Prize, The Japan Society for the Promotion of Science
- 2008 - The Humboldt Prize
- 2011 - Inoue Prize For Science
- 2014 - Medal with Purple Ribbon, Japan
- 2015 - JMSJ Outstanding Paper Prize
- 2017 class of Fellows of the American Mathematical Society "for contributions to the structure and representation theory of reductive Lie groups".
- 2022 - Doctorat Honoris Causa, University of Reims Champagne-Ardenne, France
- 2026 - Fujihara Award

== Selected publications ==
Journal articles

- Kobayashi, Toshiyuki (1994). "Discrete decomposability of the restriction of Aq(λ) with respect to reductive subgroups and its applications". Invent. Math. 117: 181–205. Bibcode:1994InMat.117..181K. doi:10.1007/BF01232239. S2CID 123460402.
- Kobayashi, Toshiyuki (1998). "Discrete decomposability of the restriction of Aq(λ) with respect to reductive subgroups II - micro-local analysis and asymptotic K-support". Annals of Mathematics. 147 (3): 709–729. doi:10.2307/120963. JSTOR 120963. MR 1637667.
- Kobayashi, Toshiyuki (1998). "Discrete decomposability of the restriction of Aq(λ) with respect to reductive subgroups III - restriction of Harish-Chandra modules and associated varieties". Invent. Math. 131: 229–256. doi:10.1007/s002220050203. S2CID 118127269.

Books

- Kobayashi, T. (1992). Singular unitary representations and discrete series for indefinite Stiefel manifolds U(p,q;F)/U(p-m,q;F). Memoirs of AMS. ISBN 0-8218-2524-0.
- Kobayashi, T. Discontinuous groups for non-Riemannian homogeneous spaces. In: B. Engquist and W. Schmid, editors, Mathematics Unlimited - 2001 and Beyond, pages 723-747. Springer-Verlag, 2001. ISBN 3-540-66913-2.
- Kobayashi, T.; Mano, G. (2011). The Schrödinger model for the minimal representation of the indefinite orthogonal group O(p, q). Memoirs of AMS. ISBN 978-0-8218-4757-2.
- Kobayashi, T.; Speh, B. (2015). Symmetry breaking for representations of rank one orthogonal groups. Memoirs of AMS. ISBN 978-1-4704-1922-6.
- Conformal Symmetry Breaking Operators for Differential Forms on Spheress. Springer. Lecture Notes in Mathematics vol.2170. 2016. ISBN 978-981-10-2656-0.
- Kassel, F.; Kobayashi, T. (2025). Spectral Analysis on Standard Locally Homogeneous Spaces. Springer. Lecture Notes in Mathematics vol.2367. ISBN 978-981-96-1959-7.
