= Risa Wechsler =

American physicist

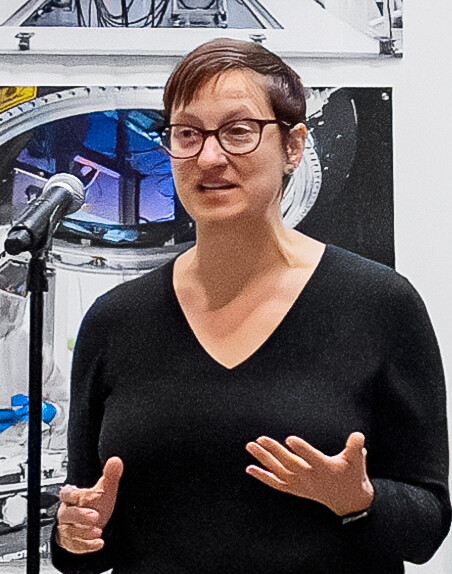
- Born: Seattle, WA, United States
- Education: Massachusetts Institute of Technology; University of California, Santa Cruz
- Scientific career
- Fields: Physics, cosmology, astrophysics
- Workplaces: Stanford University
- Website: risawechsler.com

Risa H. Wechsler is an American cosmological physicist, Professor of Physics at Stanford University, and Professor of Particle Physics and Astrophysics at SLAC National Accelerator Laboratory. She is the director of the Kavli Institute for Particle Astrophysics and Cosmology. She was elected a Member of the National Academy of Sciences in 2025.

== Education & Career ==
Wechsler earned her S.B. in Physics from the Massachusetts Institute of Technology in 1996, and earned her Ph.D from the University of California, Santa Cruz in 2001. She completed postdoctoral research at the University of Michigan Department of Physics from 2001 to 2003, and at the University of Chicago from 2003-2006, where she was a NASA Hubble Fellow in the Department of Astronomy & Astrophysics, and an Enrico Fermi Fellow at the Enrico Fermi Institute. She joined the faculty of the Department of Physics at Stanford University in 2006.

Wechsler has been a Trustee on the Board of the Aspen Center for Physics, and a board member of KICC and NOIRLab since 2020. She has served on the Board on Physics and Astronomy of the National Academy of Sciences since 2021, and has been on the Operations Management Board of the Rubin Observatory since 2022.

== Research ==
Wechsler’s cosmology research investigates dark energy, dark matter, galaxy formation, and the growth of structure in the universe. She has pursued many collaborative research projects in the course of which she has served as Co-Spokesperson for the Dark Energy Spectroscopic Instrument (DESI) Collaboration (2014-2018) and has worked on the Rubin Observatory's Legacy Survey of Space and Time (LSST) Dark Energy Science Collaboration and the Dark Sky Simulations on the Titan Supercomputer. She founded the Satellites Around Galactic Areas (SAGA) Survey with Marla Geha, and helped initiate the Dark Energy Survey in 2004.

== Recognition ==
- Member, National Academy of Sciences, elected 2025
- Outstanding Leader Award, Stanford Faculty Women's Forum, 2023
- Member, American Academy of Arts and Sciences, elected 2023
- Distinguished Alumna, University of California, Santa Cruz, 2022
- Fellow, American Association for the Advancement of Science, elected 2020
- Stanford Fellows, 2019-2023
- Fellow, American Physical Society, elected 2017
- Stanford Faculty Scholar, 2015-2016
- Nina C. Crocker Faculty Scholar in Humanities and Sciences, 2013-2017
- Hellman Faculty Scholar, Stanford, 2008
- Terman Fellow, Stanford, 2006-2012
- Hubble Fellow, 2003-2006

== Outreach ==
Sharing her expertise with the general public, Wechsler has conveyed her passion for physics in a range of media. In 2016, she appeared on the BBC show Horizon: The Mystery of Dark Energy, and the Science Channel program called Space's Deepest Secrets: Secret History of the Big Bang. In 2012, she spoke on the PBS series Science Bytes: Dark Matters

Wechsler also collaborated with the artist Oxossi Ayofemi on an art exhibit entitled Black Matter, exhibited from July 2018 to January 2020 at the Contemporary Jewish Museum in San Francisco. The show combined discussions about the elusive nature of the universe's dark matter with notions of presence and absence in African American culture.
