= VID Specialized University =

Private university in Norway

- VID vitenskapelige høgskole
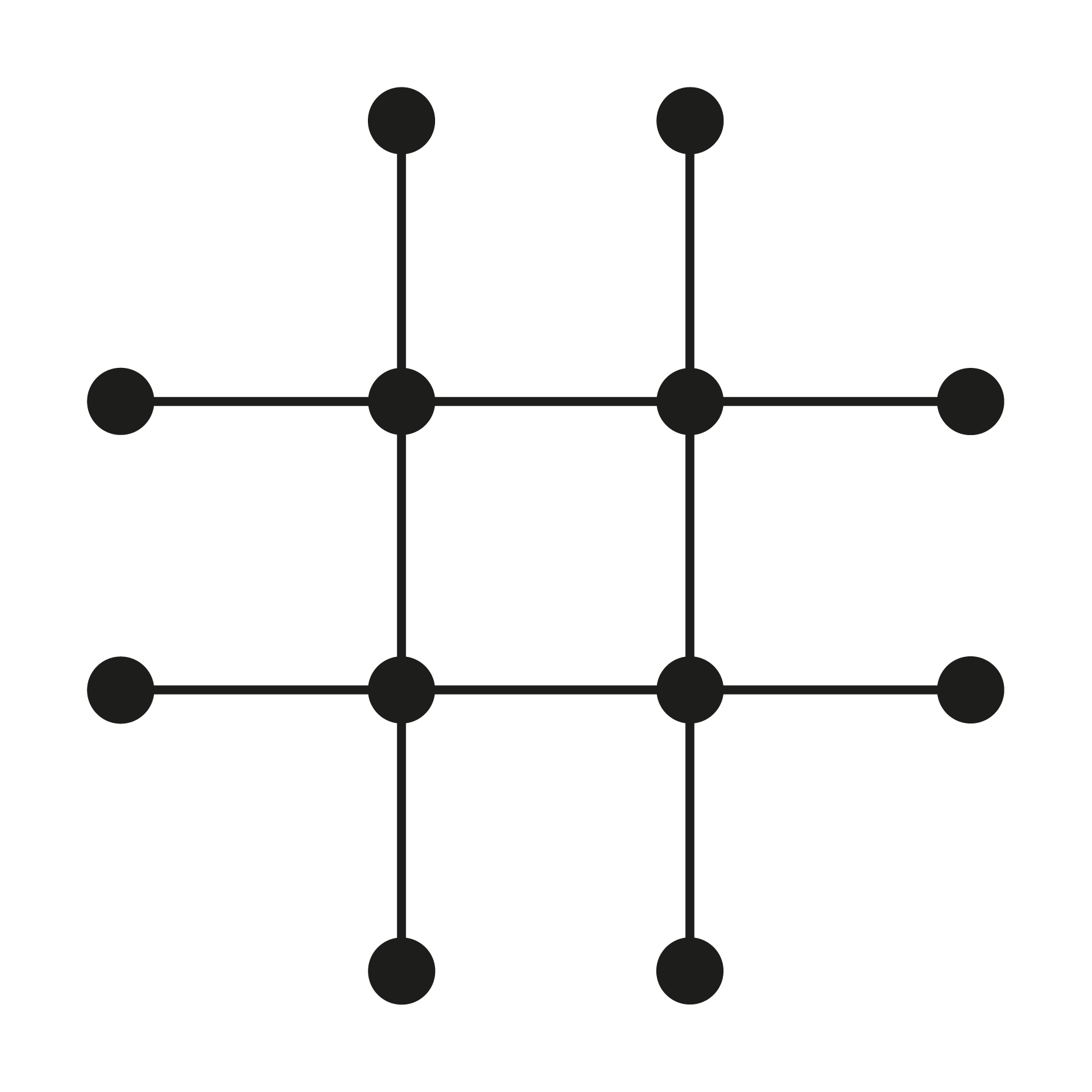
- Motto: Committed to humanity – locally and globally.
- Type: Private, non-profit, confessional
- Established: 1843 (foundation of its first college), 2016 (merger).
- Affiliations: Christian Lutheran
- Academic staff: 677 (2022)
- Administrative staff: (2018)
- Students: 6,000 (2022)
- Location: Oslo, Bergen, Stavanger, Sandnes, Tromsø, Norway; 59°56′12″N 10°42′21″E
- Website: www.vid.no

The VID Specialized University (Norwegian: VID vitenskapelige høgskole) is a Norwegian accredited, private, non-profit specialized university headquartered in Oslo. VID has 6,000 students and nearly 700 employees. It is one of three private specialized universities in Norway, alongside BI and MF.

VID is a subsidiary of the foundation Diakonhjemmet, an independent and non-profit diaconal institution within the Lutheran state Church of Norway. VID was established in 2016 through a merger of Diakonhjemmet University College with several smaller colleges with a history dating back to 1843. VID Diakonhjemmet, its headquarters and largest campus, is located in Frøen in Oslo next to Diakonhjemmet Hospital, also owned by Diakonhjemmet. The first rector of VID was Ingunn Moser.

VID conducts research and offers studies from bachelor's to doctoral level in health sciences, social sciences, and theology. VID has around 50 study programmes, including three doctoral programmes. It is the largest private PhD-awarding institution in Norway. The traditional core activity is nurse education, which is still the largest study programme and carried out in cooperation with Diakonhjemmet Hospital and other hospitals. It also offers degrees at all levels in social work disciplines. The university also offers the professional six-year degree in theology (cand.theol.) that qualifies for the priesthood in the state Church of Norway.

== History ==
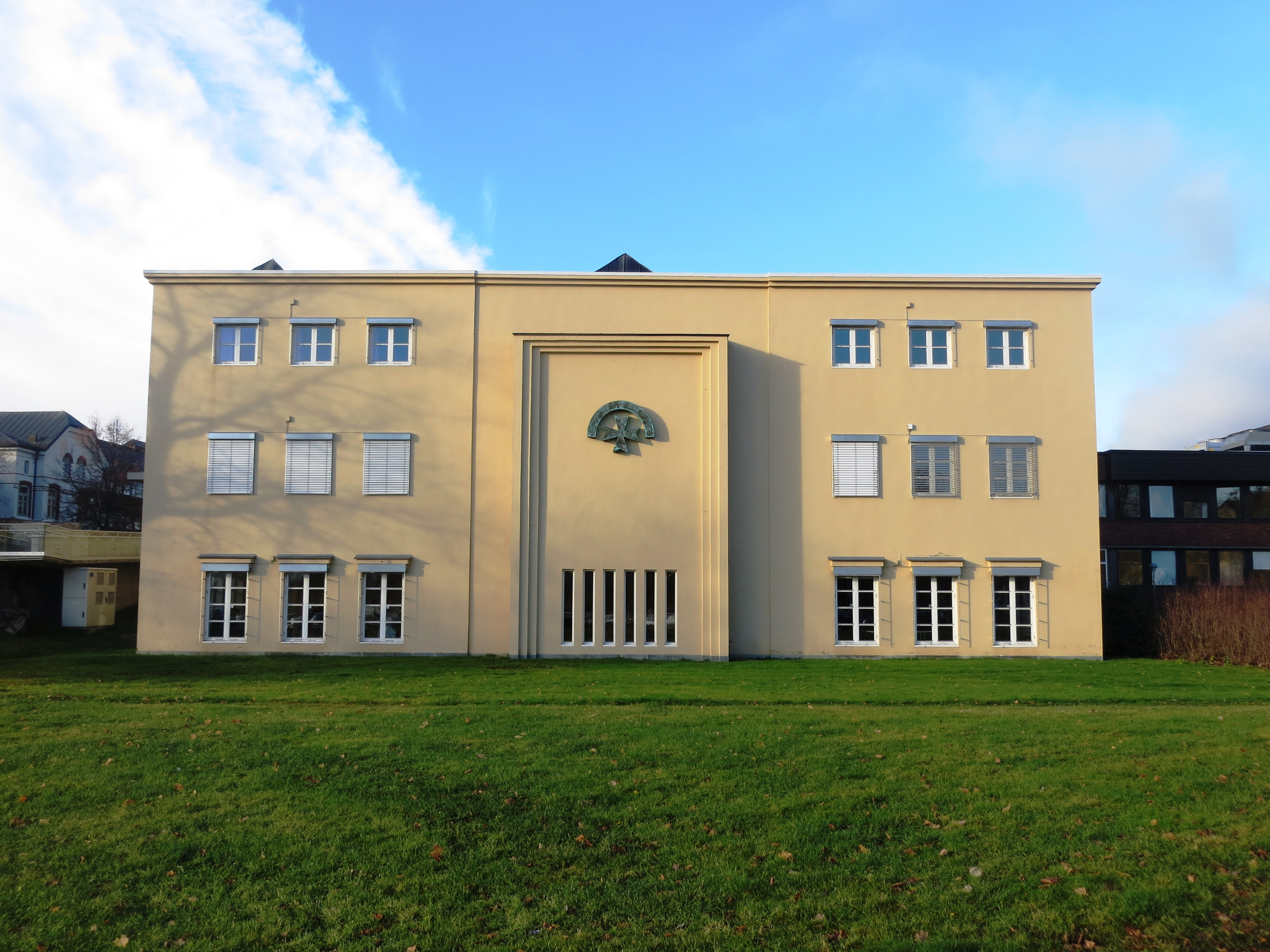
VID Diakonhjemmet main campus in Oslo, next to Diakonhjemmet Hospital

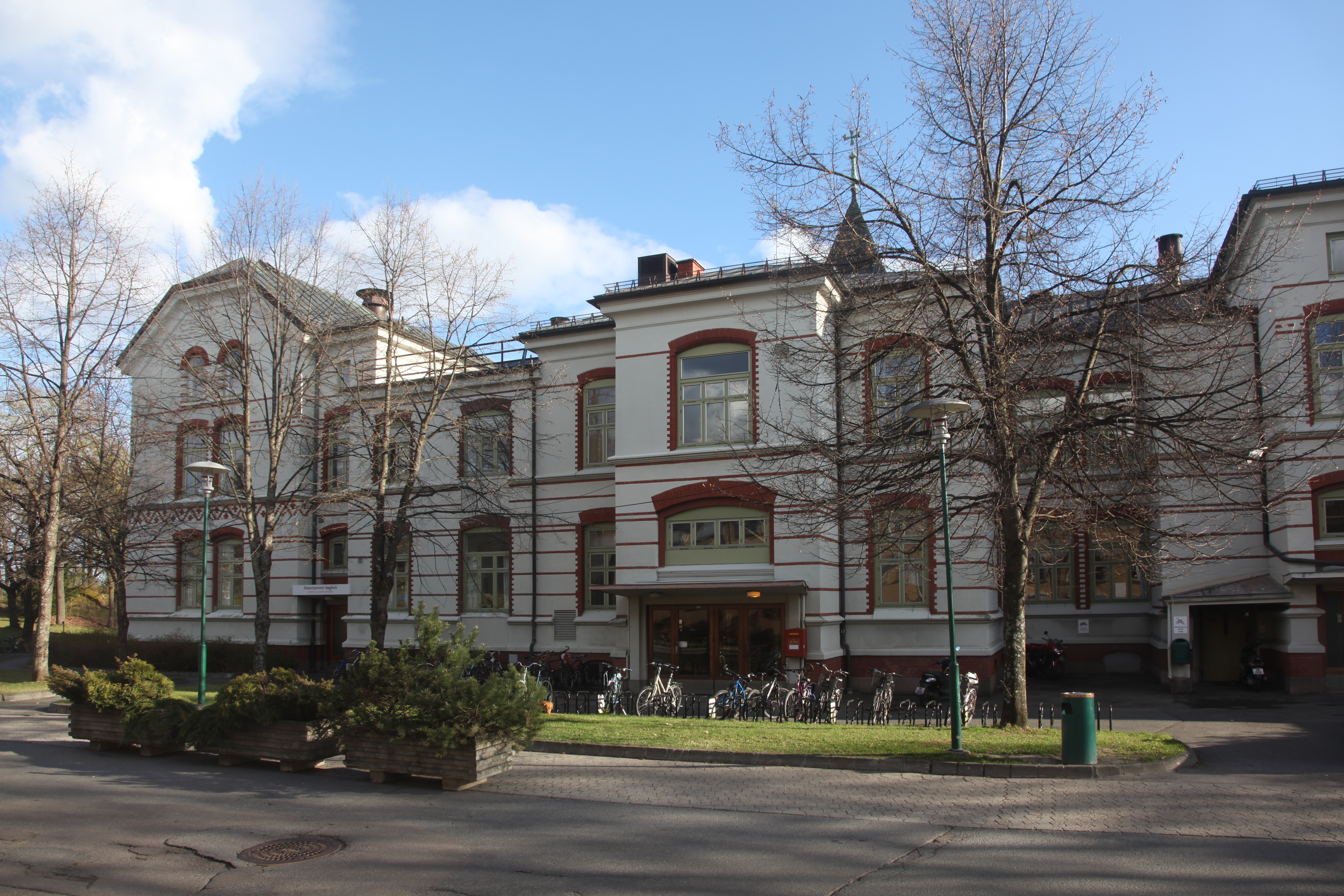
VID Diakonhjemmet main campus in Oslo, next to Diakonhjemmet Hospital

VID Specialized University roots lie in 1843, making VID the oldest private institution of higher education in Norway. The current university was established on 1 January 2016 through a merger of the School of Mission and Theology in Stavanger, Haraldsplass Diaconal College in Bergen, Betanien University College in Bergen, and the Diakonhjemmet University College in Oslo and Sandnes. On 1 January 2018, Diakonova University College became part of VID. The constituting schools have traditionally been involved with missionary and diaconal activities both in Norway and abroad. VID continues with this tradition, offering health, social work, management and religious formation for a national and global public.

=== Colleges ===
The School of Mission and Theology or Misjonshøgskolen (MHS) was founded in 1843 in Stavanger, which makes it the third-oldest institution for higher education in Norway, after the War School (1750) and the University of Oslo (1811). Long associated with the Norwegian Mission Society, MHS was the first college to concentrate on the world outside Europe. It was also the first European college open for African students (since the 1860s), and over the 19th and the first part of the 20th century, gave the opportunity for priesthood education for young people from poor classes. MHS was accredited in 2008 as a research university

The Haraldsplass Diaconal College in Bergen began as a diaconal house in the late 19th century. Later, it became a hospital and college.

The Betanien University College was in 1923 as a nursing school at Kalfaret in Bergen. Since it is a foundation it has been linked to the Methodist Church.

The Diakonhjemmet University College was a diaconal home started in 1890. It had campuses in Oslo and Sandness.

The Diakonova University College was a diaconal institution owned by a foundation part of the Church of Norway, and joined VID in 2018.

The Kirkelig utdanningssenter nord/Girkolaš Oahpahusguovddáš Davvin (KUN) in Tromsø joined VID in 2019. KUN has a cooperation agreement with the University of Tromsø – The Arctic University of Norway (UiT), and collaborates closely with the Department of History and Religious Studies, the Faculty of Arts ("The Conservatory"), the Nord University.

The constituent institutions – especially the diaconal ones – have historical significance for the development of social work and nursing professions as well as being pioneer in female higher education in Norway.

== Academics ==
Studies at VID include professional programmes within nursing, occupational therapy, social education, family therapy, diakonia and theology at Bachelor, Master and continuing education levels.

VID offers two PhD programmes: Diakonia, Values and Professional Practice and Theology and Religion.

== Research and outreach ==
=== Mission Archives ===
VID manages the Mission Archive, which is mainly the Norwegian Missionary Society's historical archive, with extensive text and image material from the 1820s onwards. The mission archive is used by a number of Norwegian and international researchers, and also participates actively in international research and documentation projects. Currently, large parts of the collection are made digitally available.

=== Missionary Museum ===
The Mission Museum is Stavanger's oldest museum. It was established in 1864 at the same time as the School of Mission and Theology received a new building. The museum has about 5,000 items in its collections, 1,300 of these are on display. The collections contain objects of ethnographic and mission-historical interest from the countries where the Norwegian Missionary Mission has had activities: South Africa, Madagascar, Cameroon, Mali, Ethiopia, China, Hong Kong, Taiwan, Japan, Thailand and Brazil

=== Diakonia Archives ===
The Diakonia Archives keeps material from the Diakonhjemmet of Sandnes, which has been transferred to Stavanger. The main part of the Diakonia Archives consists of material from the Diakonhjemmet in Oslo. Part of the material from the archives has been used to create articles on Lokalhistoriewiki, through a collaboration between the Mission and Diaconate Archives, the VID and the Norwegian Local History Institute.

Research projects are integrated with teaching and practice while being structured around thematic research group with a long-term perspective. Research is conducted in the following centers:

- Centre of Diaconia and Professional Practice.
- Centre of Mission and Global Studies.
- Centre of Learning in Professional Education and Practice.
- Centre of Intercultural Communication.(SIK)
- Center for Value-Based Management and Innovation.

And the thematic research groups are:

- Challenges of participation (CHAPAR)
- Diaconal community development (CODE)
- Existential perspectives and existential competence in professional practice (EKSISTENSFORSK)
- Leadership and institutional values-work in practice (LIVAP)
- Learning in professional education and practice (LÆRINGSFORSK)
- Citizenship
- Migration, religion and intercultural relations (MIGREL)
- Migration Related Research (MiFo)
- Mission and Diakonia Historical Research (MiDiHi)
- Patient experiences and intervention development (PIFO)
- Professional practice with children, youth and families (PROCYF)
- Religion, Body and Health in Global Contexts (RELHEALTH)
- Religion, kultur og globalisering (RKG)
- Tjenesteutvikling og kvalitet i eldreomsorgen (TJENESTEFORSK)

== Notables ==
- Karl Ludvig Reichelt, alumnus.
