= Roberto Maiolino =

Italian–British astrophysicist

Roberto Maiolino FRS
- Born: Florence, Italy
- Citizenship: Italy, United Kingdom
- Education: University of Florence
- Known for: Research on galaxy evolution, supermassive black holes, early Universe chemical enrichment; contributions to James Webb Space Telescope, Very Large Telescope, Extremely Large Telescope
- Awards: Feltrinelli Prize in Physics (2026); Fellow of the Royal Society (2022); Knighthood in the Order of the Star of Italy (2018); Blaauw Honorary Professorship and Blaauw Lecture (2024); Honorary Professorship at University College London (2019)
- Scientific career
- Fields: Astrophysics, Galaxy evolution, Supermassive black hole, Cosmology
- Workplaces: University of Cambridge

Roberto Maiolino FRS is a British-Italian astrophysicist and the Professor of Experimental Astrophysics at the Cavendish Laboratory of the University of Cambridge, and at the Kavli Institute for Cosmology, Cambridge. He is also an Honorary Professor at University College London and a Royal Society Research Professor. From 2016 to 2021, he served as the Director of the Kavli Institute for Cosmology, Cambridge.

Maiolino is known for his work on the formation and evolution of galaxies and supermassive black holes, particularly in the early Universe. He plays a leading role in major astronomical instrumentation projects, including the James Webb Space Telescope (JWST) and instruments for the Very Large Telescope (VLT) and Extremely Large Telescope (ELT). He was elected a Fellow of the Royal Society in 2022.

== Early life and education ==
Maiolino earned a master's degree (Laurea) in physics cum laude from the University of Florence in 1992. He undertook research placements at the Instituto de Astrofísica de Canarias in 1993 and the Steward Observatory at the University of Arizona (1994–1995). He received his PhD in astronomy from the University of Florence in 1996.

== Career ==
After completing his PhD, Maiolino held a postdoctoral fellowship at the Max Planck Institute for Extraterrestrial Physics in Garching from 1995 to 1997. He then joined the Arcetri Astrophysical Observatory, first as an astronomer from 1997 to 2003 and later as senior astronomer from 2003 to 2006.

From 2006 to 2012 he was a senior astronomer at the Astronomical Observatory of Rome. In 2012 he joined the University of Cambridge as Professor in Experimental Astrophysics at the Cavendish Laboratory. He served as Director of the Kavli Institute for Cosmology, Cambridge, from 2016 to 2021.

Maiolino was part of the Science Working Group of the James Webb Space Telescope (JWST). He is a member of the core Instrument Science Team of NIRSpec, the primary spectrograph on board JWST. He is also co-PI and Project Scientist of MOONS, the next-generation multi-object spectrograph for the Very Large Telescope, and Project Scientist of ANDES, the high-resolution spectrograph for the Extremely Large Telescope.

Maiolino has also held honorary and visiting positions, including Honorary Professor at University College London (since 2019) and Blaauw Honorary Professor at the Kapteyn Institute in Groningen in 2024. In 2021, he was awarded a Royal Society Research Professorship. He was awarded two consecutive European Research Council Advanced Grants in 2016 and 2022. In 2026 he was awarded the Feltrinelli Prize in Physics.

== Research ==
Roberto Maiolino’s research focuses on galaxy evolution, black holes, and the chemical enrichment of the Universe. He has contributed to the discovery of a large population of massive black holes in the early Universe using the James Webb Space Telescope, providing insights into black hole seeding, early growth, and mergers.

His work has characterized the early chemical enrichment of galaxies and searched for signatures of Population III stars, shedding light on the formation and evolution of the first galaxies. Maiolino obtained some of the first observational evidences of quasar-driven cold outflows, demonstrating their role in galaxy evolution and transformation, and identified star formation occurring within galactic outflows. He has contributed to extensions of the Unified Model of active galactic nuclei.

He has investigated the mechanisms responsible for quenching star formation in galaxies, highlighting the roles of starvation and black hole feedback. Maiolino’s research includes the identification of heavily obscured active galactic nuclei (AGN) in X-rays and the study of X-ray absorption by nuclear clouds.

Maiolino was the first to detect the [CII] 158 μm fine-structure transition at high redshift, establishing it as a key tool for studying distant galaxies. He has explored the origin and properties of cosmic dust in the early Universe, particularly its production by supernovae and its presence in the circumnuclear regions of black holes. Additionally, he made the first spectroscopic confirmations of infrared-discovered supernovae.

== Other works ==
Maiolino is the author of Stars And Waves, a 2021 scientific thriller novel about an astronomy student who investigates a mysterious death linked to a groundbreaking discovery about exoplanets.

== Honors and awards ==
- ERC Advanced Grants (in 2016-2021 and in 2022- present)
- Knighthood in the Order of the Star of Italy (2018)
- Honorary Professorship at University College London (2019)
- Fellow of the Royal Society (2022)
- Elizabeth Spreadbury Lecture, University College London (2023)
- Blaauw Honorary Professorship and Blaauw Lecture, University of Groningen (2024)
- Michael Penston Lecture (2024)
- Feltrinelli Prize in Physics (2026)
