= Tao Fong Shan =

Hill in Hong Kong

To Fung Shan
- 道風山
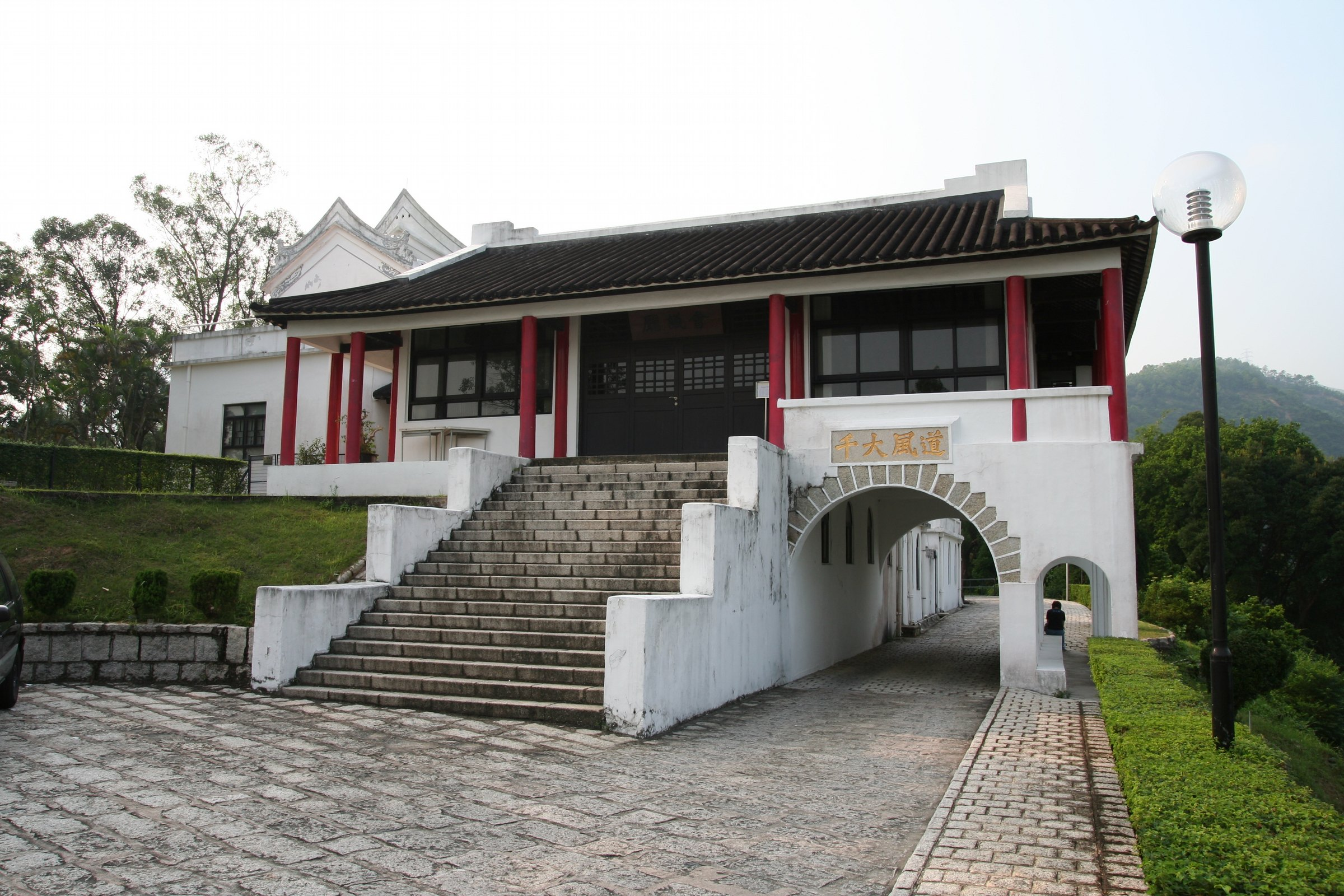
- Christian Centre on To Fung Shan

Highest point
- Elevation: 130 m (430 ft)
- Listing: List of mountains, peaks and hills in Hong Kong
- Coordinates: 22.3842°N 114.1821°E

Geography
- Location within Hong Kong
- Location: New Territories, Hong Kong

Tao Fong Shan (Chinese: 道風山), officially known as To Fung Shan, is a hill with a height of 130 metres (430 ft). It is in Sha Tin, New Territories, Hong Kong. A road called To Fung Shan Road leads to the summit, where a Christian Centre can be found.

== Place of Religious Worship ==
Tao Fong Shan Christian Centre
- Type: Christian
- Founded: 1930
- Founder: Karl Ludvig Reichelt
- Headquarters: 33 To Fung Shan Road, Sha Tin, Hong Kong
- Area served: Hong Kong, Mainland China, Scandinavia
- Owner: Areopagos Foundation
- Divisions: Spirituality, Art, Bridge and Dialogue Divisions
- Website: http://www.tfscc.org/ http://www.tfssu.org/ https://www.tfscc.org/tfsonlineshop/

Tao Fong Shan
- Traditional Chinese: 道風山
- Simplified Chinese: 道风山
- Literal meaning: "The mountain of the Christ Wind"
Transcriptions
Standard Mandarin
- Hanyu Pinyin: dào fēng shān
Yue: Cantonese
- Jyutping: dou3 fong1 saan1

Hong Kong Graded Building – Grade II

Tao Fong Shan Christian Centre (Chinese: 道風山基督教叢林) is situated at Tao Fong Shan, Sha Tin, in Hong Kong. The Centre was founded in 1930 by the Norwegian missionary Karl Ludvig Reichelt (1877–1952). Reichelt was sent to Hunan province in China in 1904. There he gradually developed an idea to share the gospel with Buddhists. In 1929, he established Jing Fong Shan in Nanjing. In 1930, due to the invasion of Japan to China, Reichelt moved his work to Sha Tin, Hong Kong, and asked a Danish architect, Johannes Prip-Moller to design the buildings. Reichelt died on 13 March 1952 and was buried at the Tao Fong Shan cemetery.

In February 2010, Tao Fong Shan became an statutory foundation in Hong Kong under the name "Tao Fong Shan Service Foundation Limited".

The buildings at the Centre are classified as Grade II historical building. Extensive restoration work took place from 2009 to 2011 with the help of the Hong Kong government's Financial Assistance for Maintenance Scheme.

Described as "a remarkable Christian retreat centre... high in the hills behind Sha Tin" by the Hong Kong government, the site is very well-known and popular among Christians in Hong Kong.

The Centre is open from 9:00 am to 5:00 pm daily.

=== Facilities ===
The Centre includes a chapel, a library and an art shop.

- The Chapel (known as The Christ Temple) is an octagonal structure; Sunday Worship is available in the building.
- Pilgrim's Hall is a Christian retreat guest house patterned after the "Cloud and Water Halls" as seen at Buddhist sites in mainland China and offers accommodation for up to 40 people in 18 double rooms. A dining hall and lounge with a capacity of 100 people are incorporated into Pilgrim's Hall.
- The Conference Hall is a traditional Chinese-style hall; it is designed for conferences and seminars, with a seating capacity for 60 people.
- A 12-metre-high cross, facing Sha Tin, is the hallmark of the Centre. The cross is a popular among visitors and is a place for outside gatherings and meetings.
- Ascension House, a former hostel located off of the main Centre grounds, has been renovated and is now used to supplement Pilgrim's Hall to accommodate overnight retreat guests and volunteers. Common kitchen facilities are available here, unlike the accommodation at Pilgrim's Hall. The nearby, 5-room Ching Fong Tai serves a purpose similar to Ascension House but only accommodates up to 7 people.
- A Labyrinth is located next to the Lotus Pond, and is used for prayer and contemplation.

=== Transportation ===

Tao Fong Shan is located in the rural part of Sha Tin, but can be easily reached by walking. From East Rail line's Sha Tin station, it only takes 20 minutes to get to the centre via a hiking trail.

For guests and visitors, the most common type of transportation is the taxi, which is HK$25 if taken from Tai Wai. In addition, Tao Fong Shan Service Unit also operates a shuttle bus just for staff and guests at the Centre a few times daily from Sha Tin.

=== Gallery ===
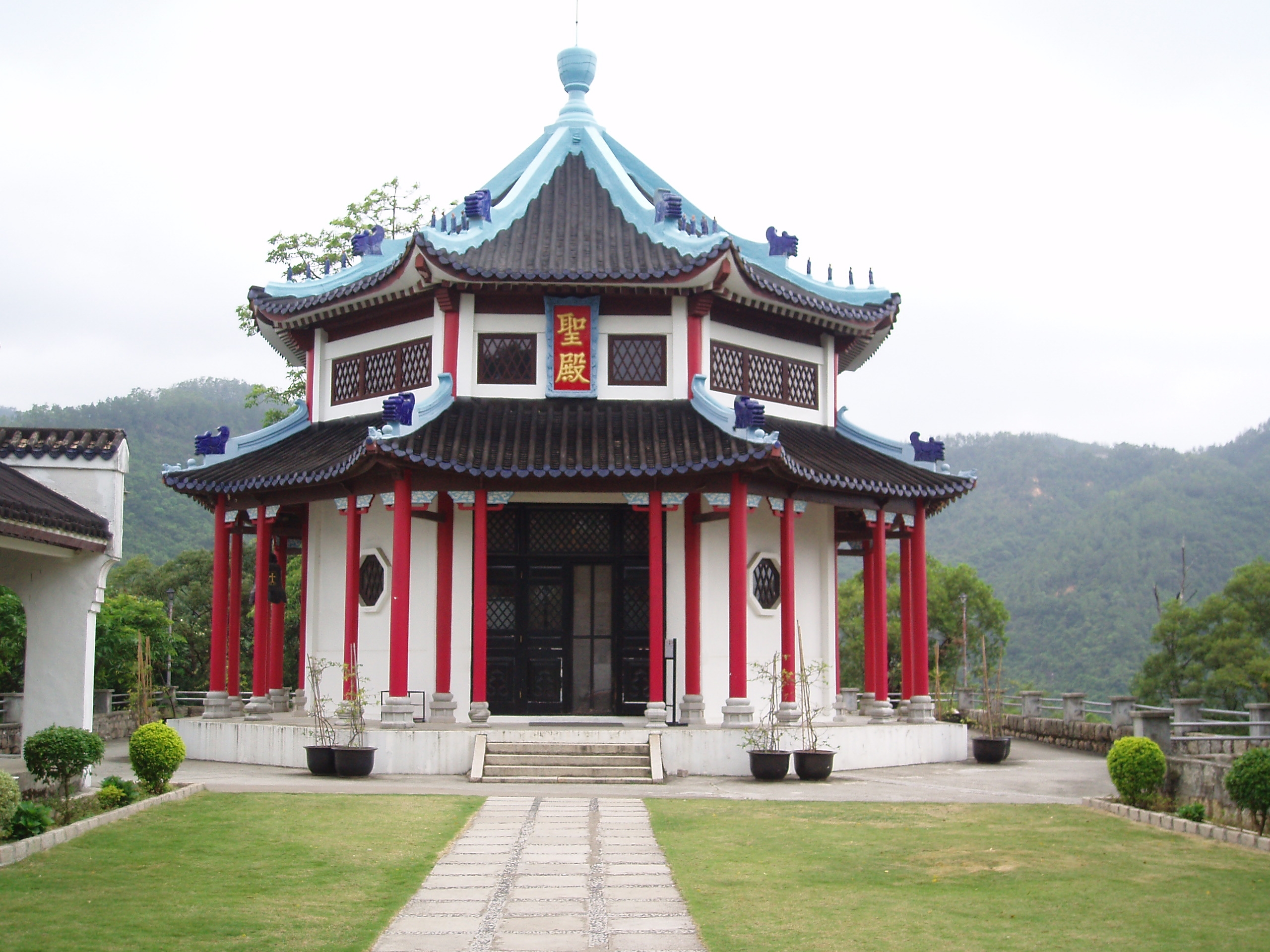
The Chapel

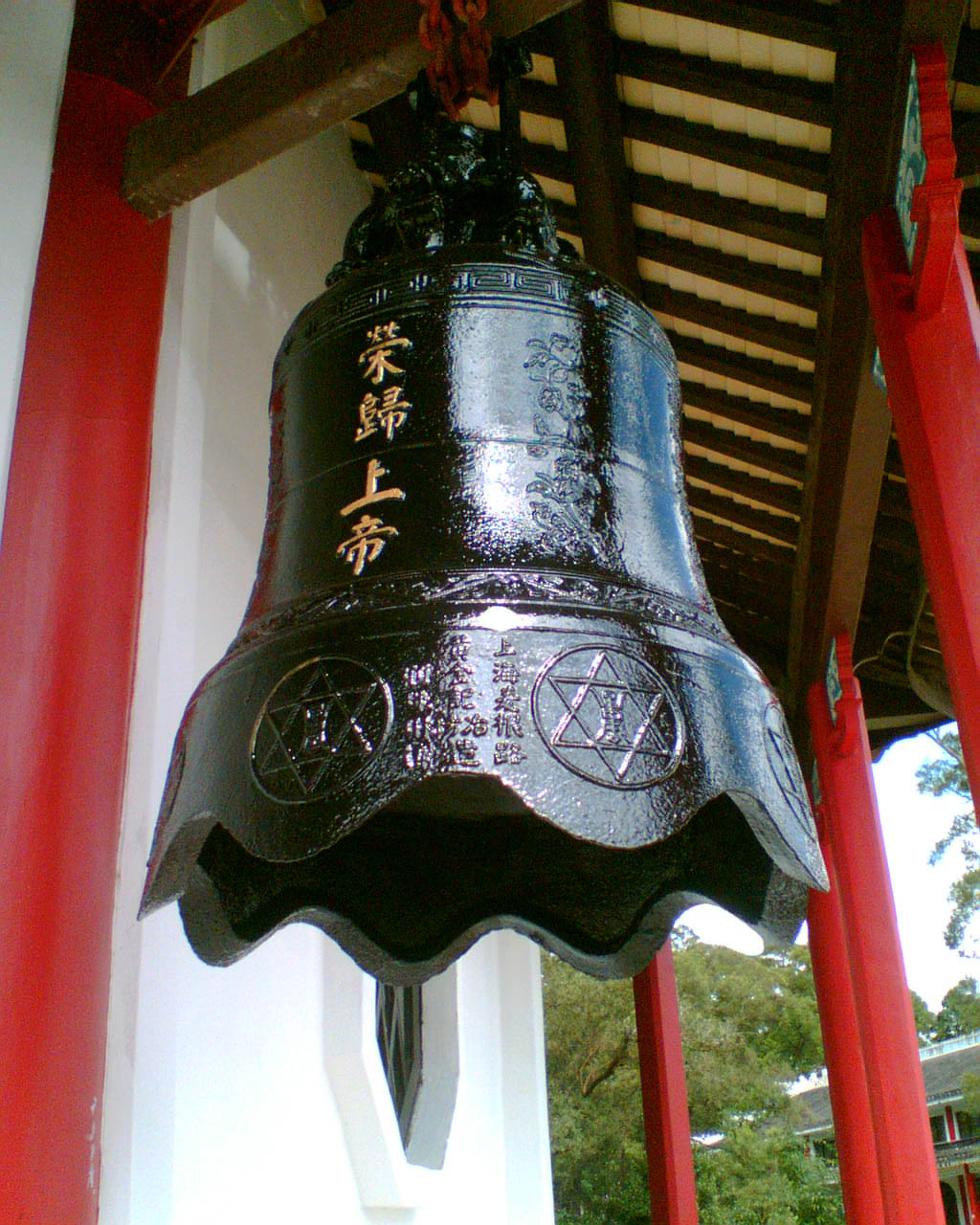
The Bell outside the Chapel

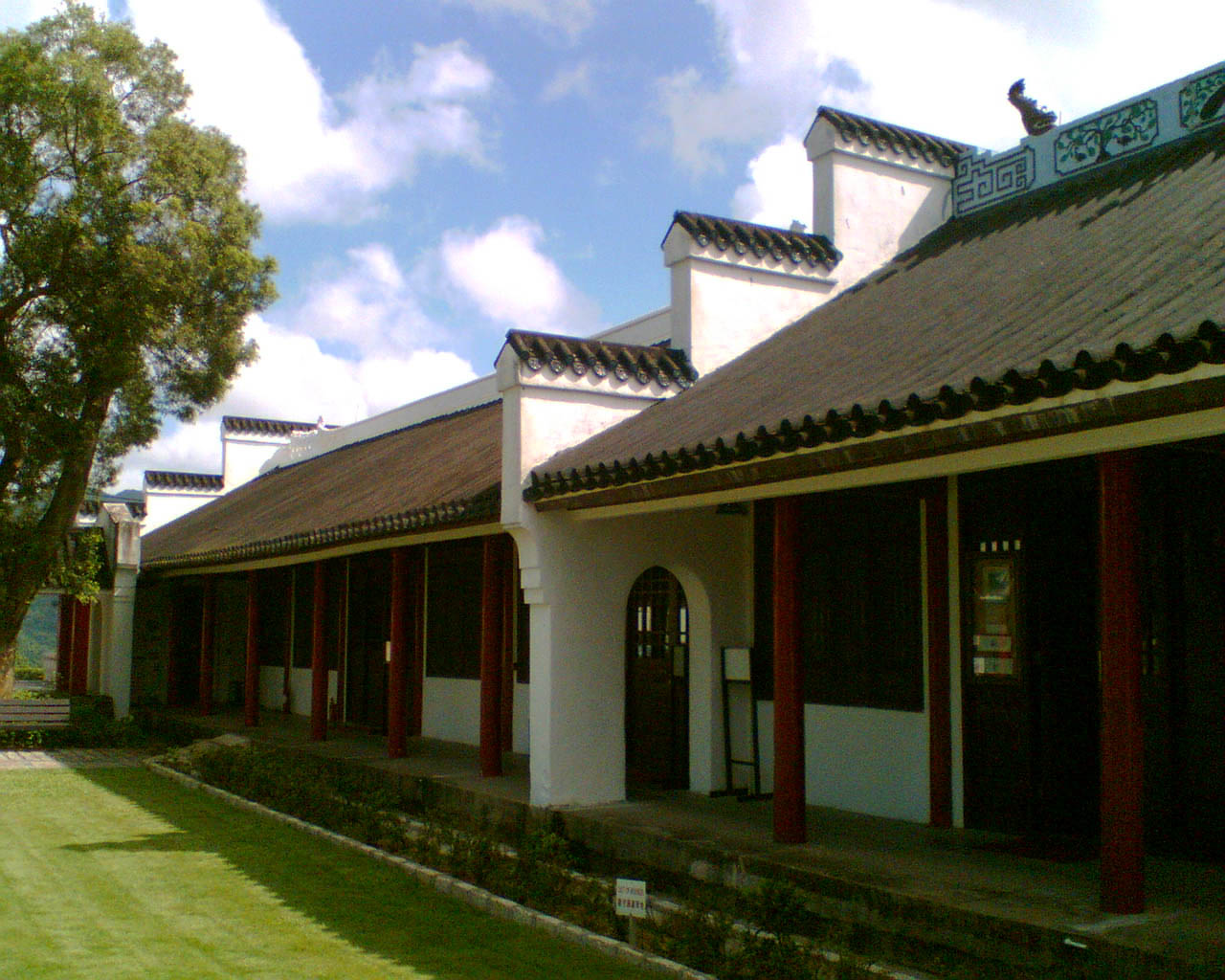
The Offices and Art Shop

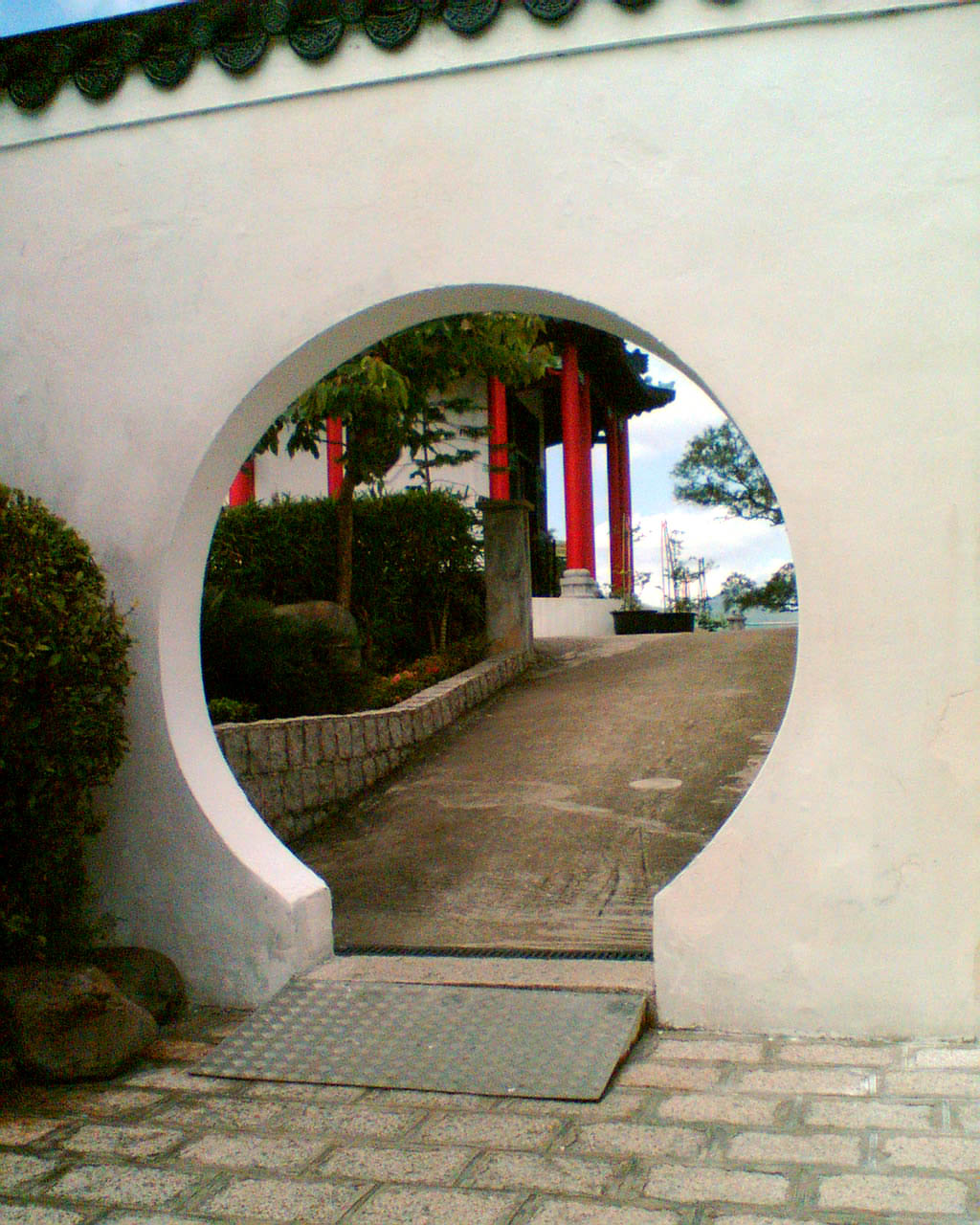
'Keyhole Styled' entrance to main buildings

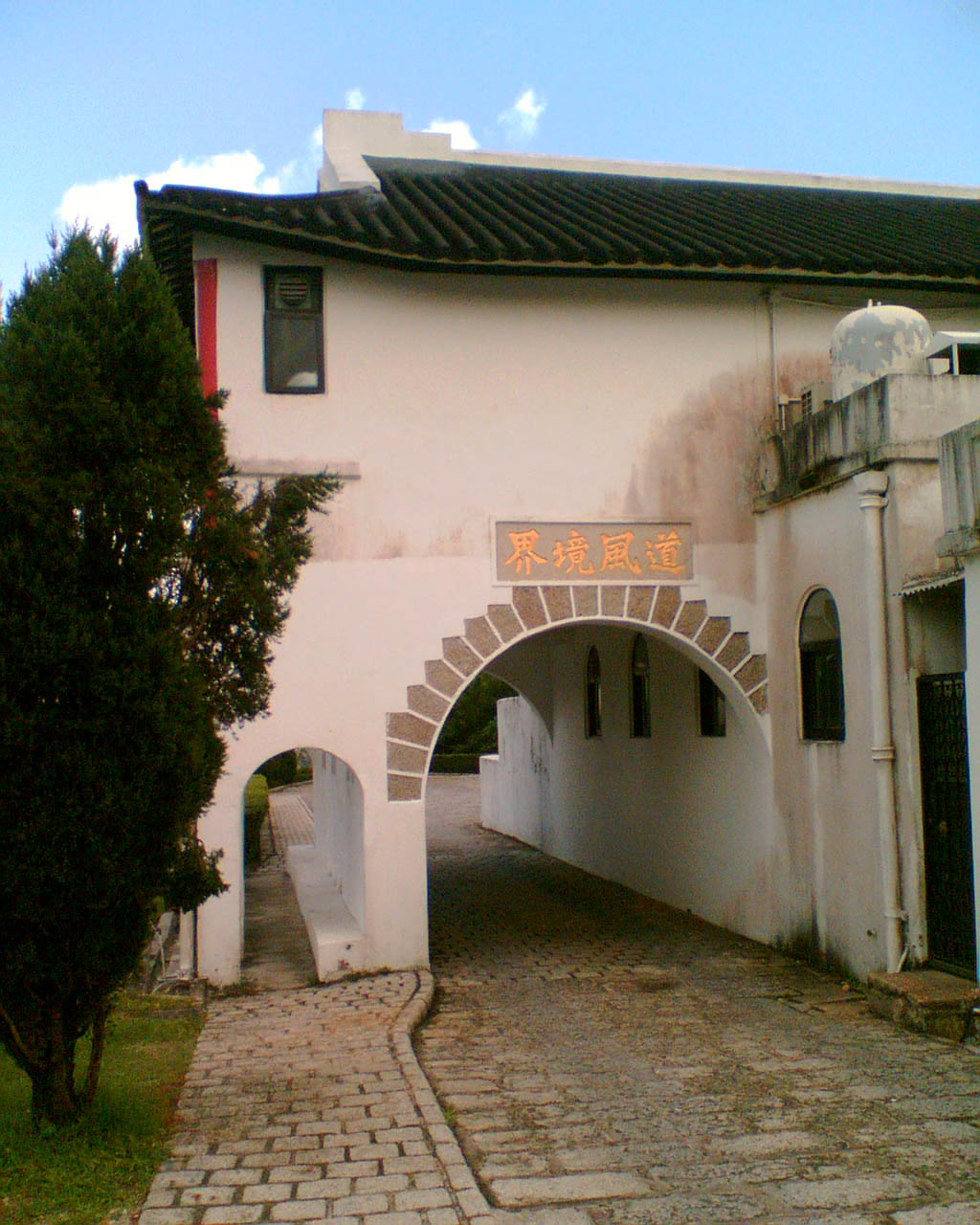
The 'covered driveway'

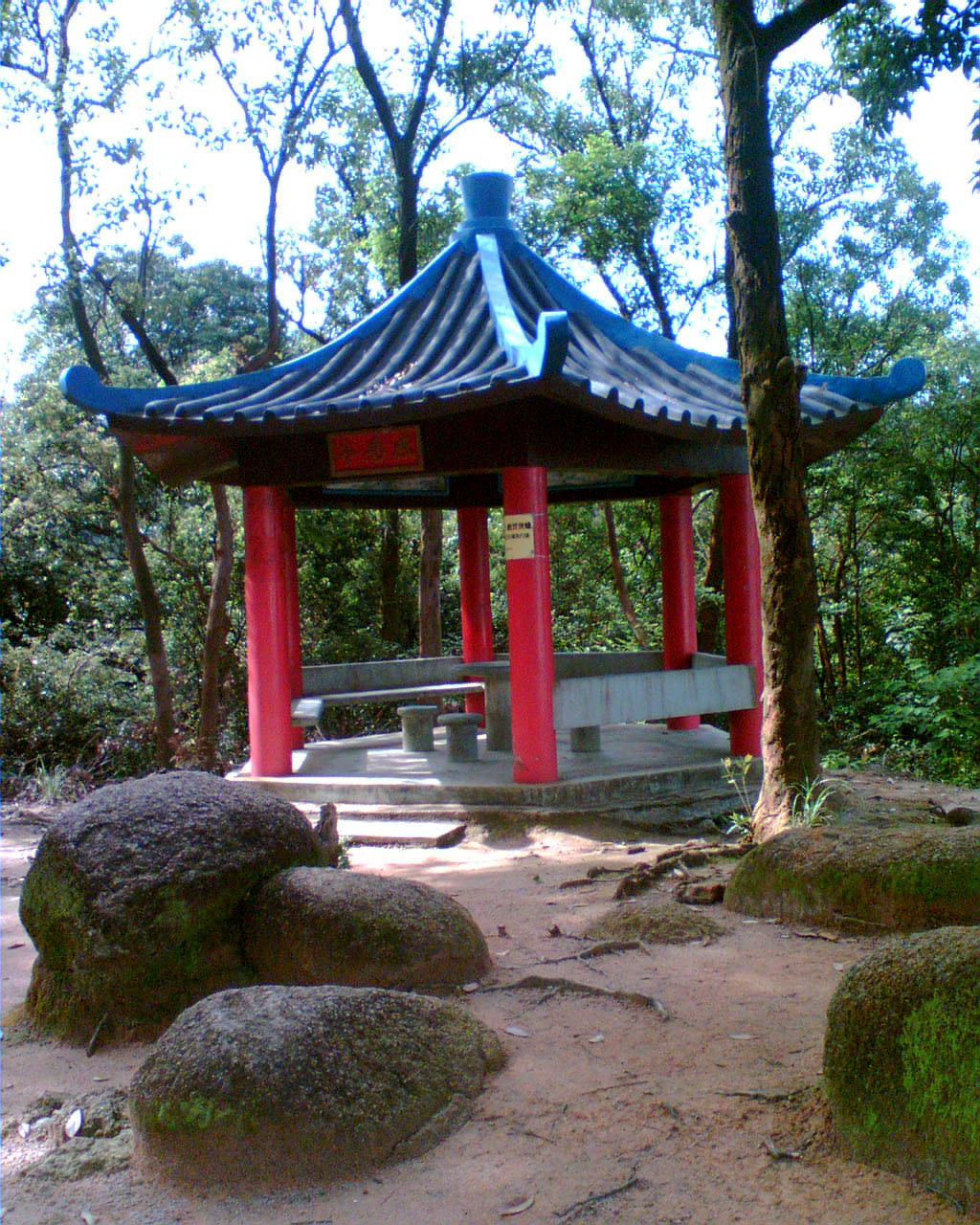
Pavilion of Tao Fong Shan

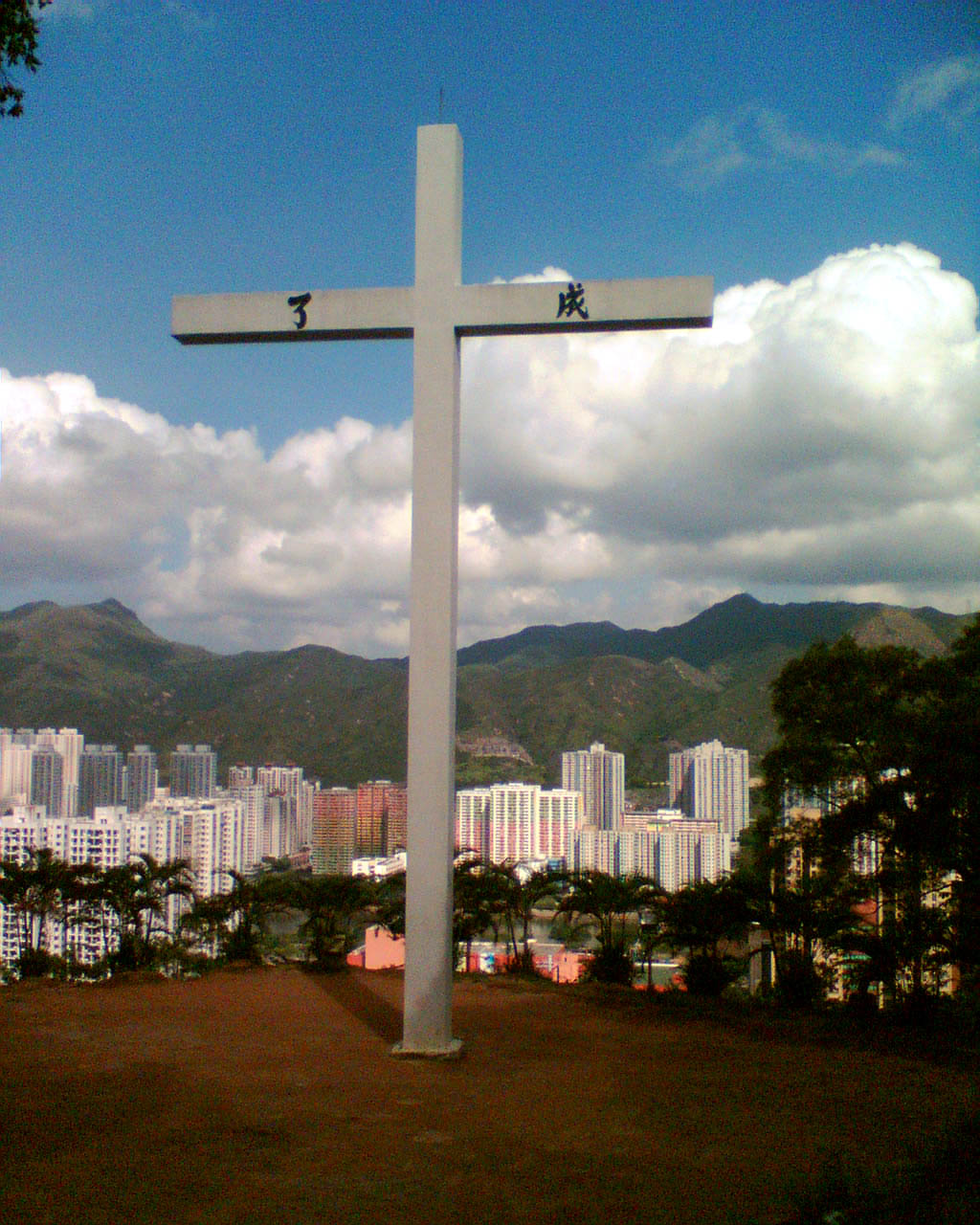
The Cross facing Sha Tin

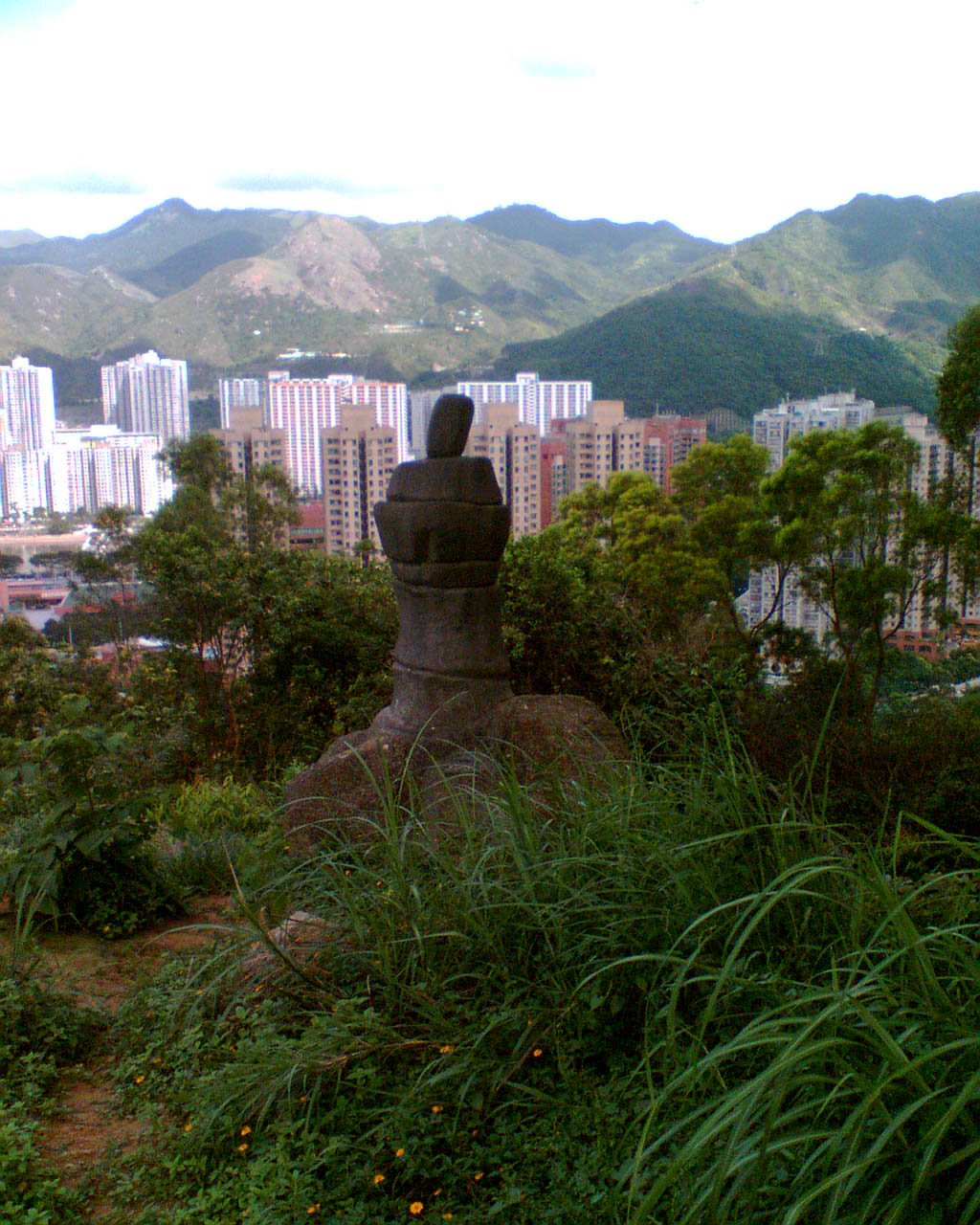
A replica of Amah Rock, located at Tao Fung Shan
