= Ingunn Moser =

Norwegian sociologist and university and health executive

Ingunn Moser (born in 1965) is a Norwegian sociologist and university and health executive. Since 2019 she has served as CEO of the foundation Diakonhjemmet, that includes the hospital Diakonhjemmet Sykehus (with around 2,000 employees) and VID Specialized University. From 2016 to 2019 she served as the first rector (president) of VID Specialized University, and before 2016 she served as rector of VID's predecessor, Diakonhjemmet University College. Moser is a professor of sociology at VID Specialized University. She is the sister of the Nobel Prize laureate Edvard Moser. She was born in Norway to parents who had immigrated from West Germany in the 1950s.
