= Marianne Fyhn =

Norwegian biologist and neuroscientist

- Born: 11 October 1973 (age 53)
- Scientific career
- Doctoral advisor: May-Britt Moser and Edvard Moser

Marianne Hafting Fyhn (born 11 October 1973) is a Norwegian biologist and professor at the University of Oslo. She was an important part of the team that worked on grid cell, which later resulted, in 2014, Norwegian scientists receiving the Nobel Prize in Physiology or Medicine for the first time. Her PhD was also named the best in the world in neurobiology in 2005.

Fyhn was inducted into the Norwegian Academy of Science and Letters in 2020.
