= Kavli Institute for Particle Astrophysics and Cosmology =

Coordinates: 37.42818°N 122.1726°W

The Kavli Institute for Particle Astrophysics and Cosmology (KIPAC) is an independent joint laboratory of Stanford University and the SLAC National Accelerator Laboratory, founded in 2003 by a gift by Fred Kavli and The Kavli Foundation. It is housed on the grounds of the SLAC National Accelerator Laboratory, as well as on the main Stanford campus. It is one of 20 Kavli Institutes.

== History ==
Roger Blandford was the director from 2003 until 2013, and Steven Kahn was the initial deputy director. Tom Abel was appointed acting director in 2013, and director in 2015. In 2018, Risa Wechsler took the position of KIPAC's director.

== See also ==
- Galileo Galilei Institute for Theoretical Physics
- Kavli Institute for the Physics and Mathematics of the Universe
- Kavli Institute for Theoretical Physics
