= Karl Ludvig Reichelt =

Norwegian missionary and sinologist

Karl Ludvig Reichelt (1 September 1877 – 13 March 1952) was a Norwegian Lutheran missionary and religious scholar who worked in China. He was a missionary for the Norwegian Missionary Society from 1903 to 1922. In 1922, he established the Nordic Christian Buddhist Mission. He also founded the institution Tao Fong Shan in Hong Kong. He became most known for his work among Buddhists and writings about Buddhism.

== Early life and education ==
Karl Ludvig Reichelt grew up in a pietistic environment in Barbu Municipality, near Arendal. His father Carl Ludvig Reichelt was a sea captain who died when Karl Ludvig was still a child. His mother Othilie Helene Gundersen, who was the Matron at an orphanage, provided that the boy had teacher education at Teachers' College Notodden in 1895. He then spent some time teaching in Telemark, and was lay preacher in his spare time.

Karl Ludvig Reichelt began in the mission school in Stavanger at the age of 20 years in 1897. He was ordained at Our Savior's Church in Oslo 20 March 1903 by Bishop Anton Christian Bang.

== Missionary work ==
In 1903 was sent by the Norwegian Missionary Society (NMS) to China. In October he came with his fiancée and later ('05) wife, Anna Dorothea Gerhardsen, to Shanghai, but left soon after for to Hunan province. Gerhardsen followed suit. In the provincial capital Changsha they settled down to begin their language studies. Karl Ludvig Reichelt had the first part of his work in Hunan. After the one-year language course, he was sent to the city of Ningxiang City, which was a mission field for the Missiorary Society. In 1906, he had an experience that would be crucial to his later work when he undertook his first visit to the famous Buddhist Weishan monastery close to town. He later wrote that he just gave a glimpse of a unique and exclusive world of deep religious mysticism, of heartbreaking tragedy, but also immensely rich. He felt that God called him to a special way to work among Buddhists, and cultivate a friendly dialogue with the monks and the enlightened Buddhist laity. This he used some force to his years in Hunan and Hubei, first as a pioneer missionary (to 1911, when he returned to Norway for a time), then as a teacher in the NT at the priest school in Shekou (1913–1920).

He was particularly suited to the study of Buddhism and the Buddhist religious writings. In 1919 he had the opportunity to be involved in renaming a Buddhist monk.

During a stay in Norway from 1920 to 1922 he got the green light from the NMS to build a Christian center of the Buddhist monks to come and stay for shorter or longer time, and there have personal contact with Christianity. He travelled in Sweden, Denmark, Finland, Germany and the United States to generate interest for his project, and also received some pledges of support, including from the Church of Sweden and the Danish Mission Association. A coordination committee for the mission companies in the three Scandinavian countries, was established to guarantee a minimum amount of support in case the gift supply would not reach the expected size. NMS also promised to pay him wages, even though he would work on his own.

Reichelt and missionary Notto Normann Thelle then went back and got their planned center, called the Ching Fong Shan ("the shining wind rock"), just outside Nanjing. It was not long before the first itinerant Buddhist monks found their way to the Christian "monastery", and eventually, the number of such visitors in approximately 1,000 per year, and most were there for a longer or shorter period. Some were Christian and were baptized.

In his meeting with China's Buddhist monks, Karl Ludvig Reichelt developed a new view on mission work that made him controversial. Particularly controversial was his view of God's revelation and the religions (especially Buddhism) as a preparation for the gospel (praeparatio evangelica), his dialogical method, and his positive evaluation of other religions. NMS became concerned that Reichelt openness to Buddhism went too far, especially when Reichelt meant to find "points of light and connection points brought forth by God's Holy Spirit ... in their sacred writings (and) in their rituals and thinking systems". It ended with NMS calling Reichelt home for consultations due to this and some financial problems, and it ended with the split from Reichelt in 1925.

In 1926, Reichelt founded The Nordic Christian Buddhist Mission (or the Nordic-East Asia Mission, later the Areopagus). Work continued in Nanjing, and in 1927, 22 Chinese people were baptized. But the same year the mission station was destroyed during a riot, and Reichelt and Thelle had to flee the city.

For two years they worked in Shanghai. In 1929 Reichelt built the institution Tao Fong Shan ("the mountain where the wind blows Logos") in Sha Tin in the Sha Tin District of the New Territories in Hong Kong. This institute has since been the seat of the Buddhist Mission's work in China.

He left China in 1947, and settled down in Hong Kong in 1951. He died at the Tao Fong Shan in Hong Kong on 13 March 1952.

== Writings ==
Karl Ludvig Reichelt wrote both scholarly and popular literature. He wrote several books in Chinese and several works on East Asia religions, including Religions of China (1st ed. 1913) and From Convenience Types and shrines in East Asia (Three volumes, 1947–1949).

== Awards and legacy ==
Reichelt was awarded the St. Olav's Medal in 1939 and was appointed honorary doctor at Uppsala University for his extensive research on Eastern religious life in 1941.

== Works ==
- Kinas religioner. Haandbok i den kinesiske religionshistorie, Stavanger 1913, 2. opplag 1922
- Det rene land. ("Tsing tou"). En oversættelse af det merkelige buddhistiske skrift "De vigtigste momenter ved dyrkelsen av "Det rene lands lære" med vedføjede indledningsbemærkninger, København 1928
- Mot Tibets grænser. With chapters by Arthur Hertzberg. 1933
- Fromhetstyper og helligdommer i Øst-Asia, I - III, 1947–49
  - English translation: Meditation and Piety in the Far East: a Religious-Psychological Study by Karl Ludvig Reichelt, translated by Sverre Holth, New York: Harper & Brothers, 1954
- Laotse. Gyldendal, 1948. Translation of the Tao te ching,
  - reissued in 1982 with the title Tao te ching and an introduction by Henry Henne. Gyldendal, 1982. ISBN 82-05-13333-6,
  - reissued in 2001, as Tao te ching: utvalgte taoistiske skrifter, edited by Rune Svarverud and Notto R. Thelle; translated from Karl Ludvig Reichelt (Tao te ching) and Rune Svarverud (Zhuangzi). De norske bokklubbene, 2001, ISBN 82-525-4104-6
- 16 books by Karl Ludvig Reichelt at Preservation for the Documentation of Chinese Christianity Program, Hong Kong Baptist University Library
- 22 Manuscripts by Karl Ludvig Reichelt at Preservation for the Documentation of Chinese Christianity Program, Hong Kong Baptist University Library
