= Kavli Foundation (United States) =

Foundation that supports the advancement of science

The Kavli Foundation
- Formation: 2000
- Headquarters: Los Angeles, CA, USA
- President: Cynthia M. Friend
- Revenue: $42,439,383 (2015)
- Expenses: $54,389,074 (2015)
- Website: kavlifoundation.org

The Kavli Foundation, based in Los Angeles, California, is a foundation that supports the advancement of science and the increase of public understanding and support for scientists and their work.

The Kavli Foundation was established in December 2000 by its founder and benefactor, Fred Kavli, a Norwegian-American business leader and philanthropist, who made his money by creating Kavlico, a company that made sensors, and by investing in real estate in southern California and Nevada. Kavli died in 2013, leaving the remainder of his wealth to the foundation.

David Auston, a former president of Case Western Reserve University and former Bell Labs scientist, was the first president of the Kavli Foundation, from 2002 to 2009. He was succeeded by Robert W. Conn, who was president from 2009 to 2020. Cynthia M. Friend is the third and current president in 2025.

== The Kavli Prize ==
The Kavli Prize recognizes scientists for breakthroughs in three research areas: astrophysics, nanoscience and neuroscience. Consisting of a scroll, medal and cash award of one million dollars, a prize in each of these areas has been awarded every two years since 2008. The Kavli Prize is a partnership among The Norwegian Academy of Science and Letters, The Norwegian Ministry of Education and Research, and The Kavli Foundation.

The recipients are chosen by three independent prize committees of distinguished scientists recommended by the Chinese Academy of Sciences, the French Academy of Sciences, the Max Planck Society, the U.S. National Academy of Sciences and The Royal Society. After making their selections, the recommendations of these prize committees are then confirmed by The Norwegian Academy of Science and Letters.

== The Kavli Institutes ==
The Kavli Foundation's 20 institutes focus on astrophysics, nanoscience, neuroscience and theoretical physics.

=== Astrophysics ===
- The Kavli Institute for Particle Astrophysics and Cosmology at Stanford University
- The Kavli Institute for Cosmological Physics, University of Chicago
- The Kavli Institute for Astrophysics and Space Research at the Massachusetts Institute of Technology
- The Kavli Institute for Astronomy and Astrophysics at Peking University
- The Kavli Institute for Cosmology at the University of Cambridge
- The Kavli Institute for the Physics and Mathematics of the Universe at the University of Tokyo

=== Nanoscience ===
- The Kavli Institute for Nanoscale Science at Cornell University
- The Kavli Institute of Nanoscience at Delft University of Technology in the Netherlands
- The Kavli Nanoscience Institute at the California Institute of Technology
- The Kavli Energy NanoSciences Institute at University of California, Berkeley and the Lawrence Berkeley National Laboratory
- The Kavli Institute for NanoScience Discovery at the University of Oxford

=== Neuroscience ===
- The Kavli Institute for Brain Science at Columbia University
- The Kavli Institute for Brain & Mind at the University of California, San Diego
- The Kavli Institute for Neuroscience at Yale University
- The Kavli Institute for Systems Neuroscience at the Norwegian University of Science and Technology
- The Kavli Neuroscience Discovery Institute at Johns Hopkins University
- The Kavli Neural Systems Institute at The Rockefeller University
- The Kavli Institute for Fundamental Neuroscience at the University of California, San Francisco

=== Theoretical physics ===
- Kavli Institute for Theoretical Physics at the University of California, Santa Barbara
- The Kavli Institute for Theoretical Sciences (KITS) at the University of Chinese Academy of Sciences
