= Moser research environment =

Norwegian research enviornment

Coordinates: 63°25′15″N 10°23′33″E

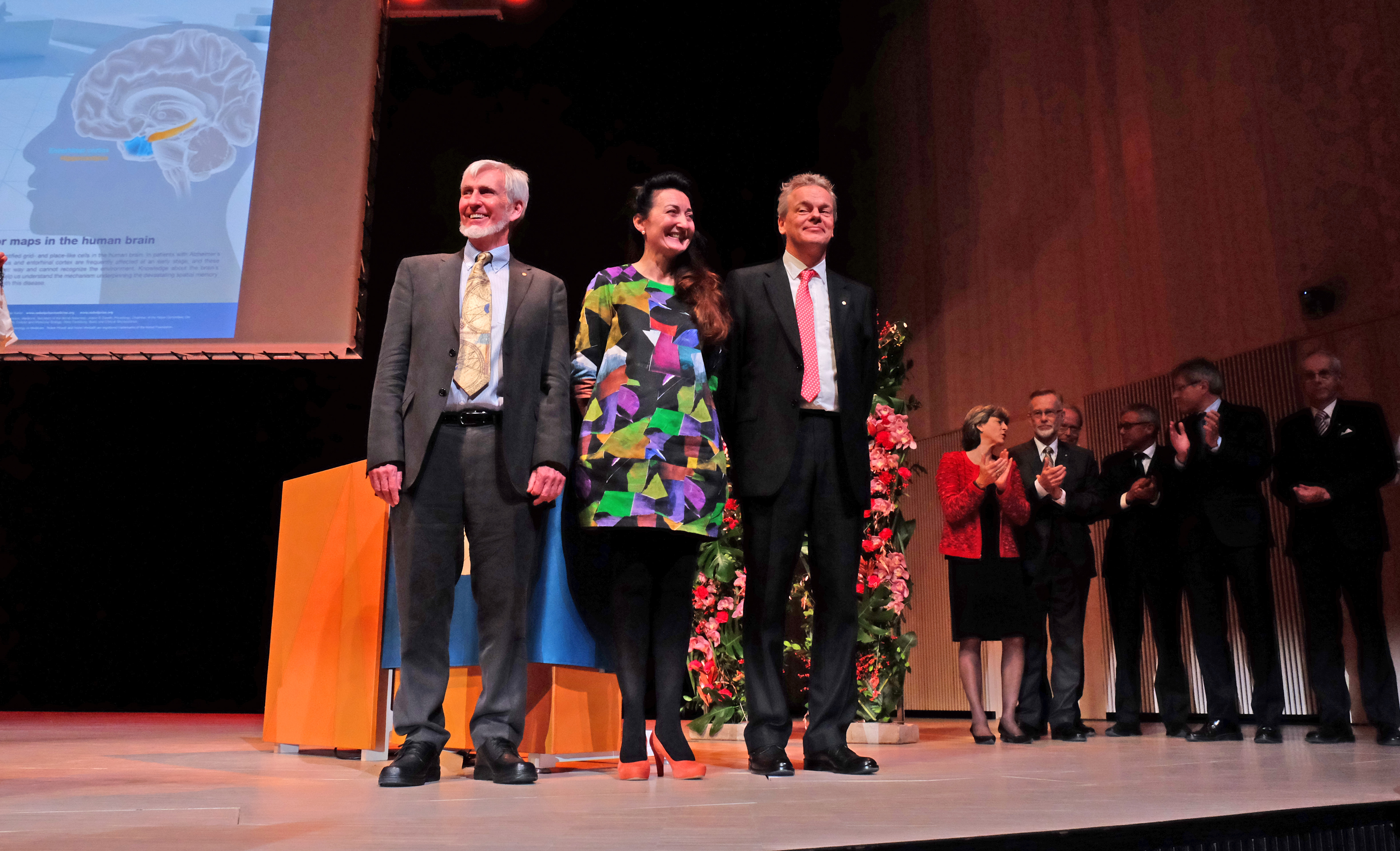
May-Britt Moser and Edvard Moser with their collaborator John O'Keefe; they received the Nobel Prize in Physiology or Medicine in 2014 "for their discoveries of cells that constitute a positioning system in the brain"

The Moser research environment (Norwegian: Moser-miljøet) is the informal name of a research environment established and led by the Nobel laureates Edvard Moser and May-Britt Moser at the Norwegian University of Science and Technology (NTNU) in Trondheim, Norway. The Mosers joined the university as professors of psychology in 1996, and formed their own neuroscience research group. The research group eventually evolved into several projects and research centers. The Mosers were awarded the 2014 Nobel Prize in Physiology or Medicine "for their discoveries of cells that constitute a positioning system in the brain."

== History ==
The Moser research environment was established in 1996 as the neuroscience research group and laboratory of the Mosers at the Department of Psychology, NTNU. In 2002 their research group was given the status of a centre of excellence by the Research Council of Norway, and thus became a separate entity under the name Centre for the Biology of Memory (CBM), with government funding for ten years. The discovery of "grid cells" was made at CBM in 2005; the Mosers received the Nobel Prize in Physiology or Medicine for this discovery in 2014 together with John O'Keefe.

In 2012 the Research Council of Norway granted the Mosers another centre of excellence, known as the Centre for Neural Computation (Norwegian: Senter for nevrale nettverk). CMB was later continued as the Kavli Institute for Systems Neuroscience. The institute is also popularly known as the Moser Institute.

The stated scientific goal is "to advance our understanding of neural circuits and systems and their role in generating psychological functions. By focusing on spatial representation and memory, we expect to uncover general principles of neural network computation in the mammalian cortex."

The Moser research environment receives more than 90% of its funding from the Norwegian government. This includes centres of excellence funded by the Research Council of Norway, support from the university's own budget, and an annual major basic research grant from the government. The research environment has received smaller private donations; in 2007 CMB received an additional donation from the Kavli Foundation in the United States, and it has also received a donation by heiress Pauline Braathen. After the CBM funding expired in 2012, the Research Council of Norway appointed a new Centre of Excellence at the institute with funding until 2022, thus establishing the Centre for Neural Computation (CNC) in January 2013. The CNC co-exists with the institute which complements the shorter-term projects at CBM/CNC, pursuing questions that demand a longer experimental time frame, aimed, ultimately, "to improve life and health by advancing the science of human cognition".

The institute is headed by Edvard Moser while May-Britt Moser heads the CNC centre. Other professors at the Institute are Menno Witter, Clifford Kentros, Yasser Roudi and Emre Yaksi.
