= Kavli Institute of Nanoscience =

Institute of Delft University of Technology

The Kavli Institute of Nanoscience Delft was established in 2004 at the Department of NanoScience, Faculty of Applied Sciences, Delft University of Technology through a grant by the US-based The Kavli Foundation. Two different departments, Quantum Nanoscience and Bionanoscience, as well as the Institute of Quantum Technology, are part of this institute.

The Kavli Institute of Nanoscience has a staff of 35 professors.

An article in de Volkskrant, a Dutch national newspaper in 2012, claimed that four of the ten most cited scientists in the Netherlands belong to the institute.

== Prizes ==
=== Best thesis prize ===
Best thesis prize is awarded to best PhD thesis emerged from Kavli Institute of Nanoscience Delft in the previous two years. This prize, which consists of an award and an amount of €3000, is given out every two years and will be announced on annual Kavli day.

==== Recipients ====
- Marijn van Loenhout (2012-2013)
- Fabai Wu (2016-2017)
- Afshin Vahid (2017-2019)
- Guoji Zheng (2019-2021)

=== Best publication prize ===
The best publication award is given biannually for the best publication resulting from the Kavli Institute of Nanoscience Delft that appeared in print in the previous two years. This prize, which consists of an award and an amount of €3000, is given out every two years and is announced on annual Kavli Day in September.

==== Recipients ====
- 2015-2016: Bas Hansen et al for their publication entitled 'Loophole-free Bell inequality violation using electron spins separated by 1.3 kilometres' appeared in Nature in 2015.
- 2017-2018: Mahipal Ganji et al for their publication entitled 'Real-time imaging of DNA loop extrusion by condensin' appeared in Science in 2018.
