= Edvard Moser =

Norwegian psychologist and neuroscientist

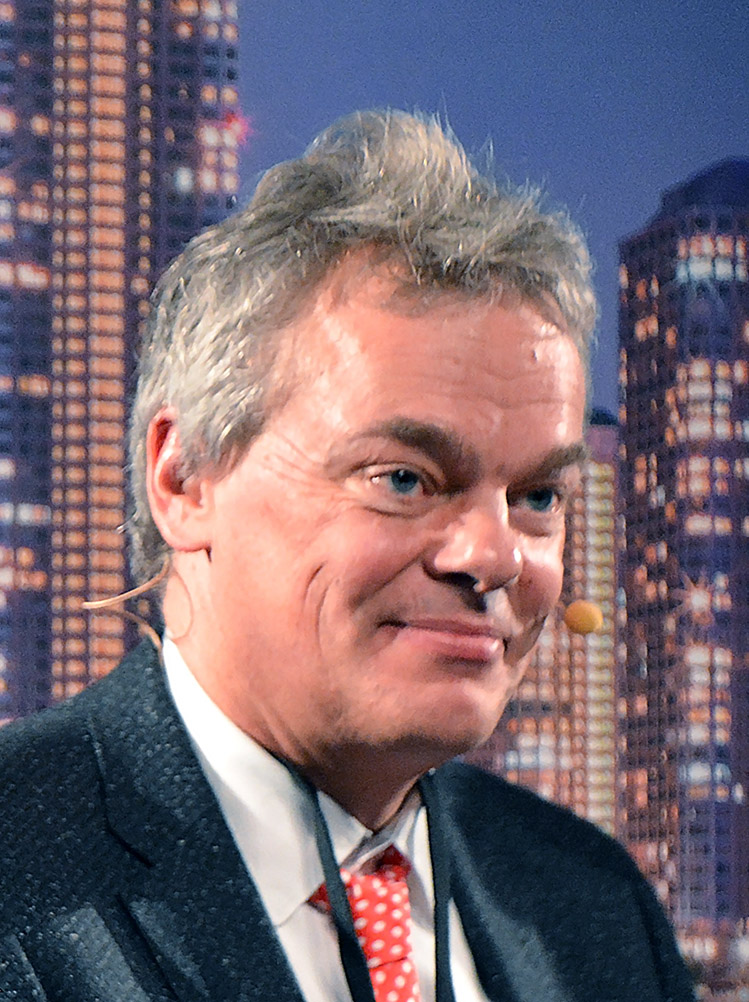
- Edvard Moser in 2015
- Born: Edvard Ingjald Moser; 27 April 1962 (age 64); Ålesund, Norway
- Education: University of Oslo
- Known for: Grid cells, place cells, border cells, neurons
- Spouse: May-Britt Moser (1985–2016)
- Awards: Louis-Jeantet Prize for Medicine (2011); Foreign Associate of the National Academy of Sciences (2014); Nobel Prize in Physiology or Medicine (2014)
- Scientific career
- Fields: Neuroscience
- Workplaces: Norwegian University of Science and Technology; University of Edinburgh
- Doctoral students: Marianne Fyhn

Edvard Ingjald Moser (pronounced [ˈɛ̀dvɑɖ ˈmoːsər]; born 27 April 1962) is a Norwegian psychologist and neuroscientist, who as of May 2024 is a professor at the Norwegian University of Science and Technology (NTNU) in Trondheim.

He shared the Nobel Prize in Physiology or Medicine in 2014 with long-term collaborator and then-wife May-Britt Moser, and previous mentor John O'Keefe for their work identifying the brain's positioning system. The two main components of the brain's GPS are grid cells and place cells, a specialized type of neuron that respond to specific locations in space. Together with May-Britt Moser he established the Moser research environment.

In 1996 he was appointed as associate professor in biological psychology at the Department of Psychology at the Norwegian University of Science and Technology (NTNU); he was promoted to professor of neuroscience in 1998. In 2002, his research group was given the status of a separate "centre of excellence". Edvard Moser has led a succession of research groups and centres, collectively known as the Moser research environment.

== Early life and education ==
Moser was born in Ålesund to German parents Eduard Paul Moser (1928–2013) and Ingeborg Annamarie Herholz (1931–). His parents had grown up in Kronberg im Taunus, a suburb of Frankfurt, where Moser's grandfather Eduard Moser had been Lutheran parish priest. Moser's father trained as a pipe organ builder and emigrated to Norway together with his friend Jakob Pieroth in 1953 when they were offered employment at a pipe organ workshop at Haramsøy. They later established their own workshop and built many church pipe organs in Norway. The Moser family originally was from Nassau; Moser is a South German topographic name for someone who lived near a swamp or mire (South German Moos). Edvard Moser grew up at Hareid Municipality and in Ålesund Municipality. He was raised in a conservative Christian family.

Edvard Moser married May-Britt Moser in 1985 when they were both students. They announced that they are divorcing in 2016.

His sister is the sociologist Ingunn Moser, known as the founding rector of VID University.

Moser was awarded the cand.psychol. degree in psychology at the Department of Psychology at the University of Oslo in 1990. He was then employed as a research fellow at the Faculty of Medicine, where he obtained his dr.philos. doctoral research degree in the field of neurophysiology in 1995. He also has studied mathematics and statistics. Early in his career, he worked under the supervision of Per Andersen.

Moser went on to undertake postdoctoral training with Richard G. Morris at the Centre for Neuroscience, University of Edinburgh, from 1995 to 1997, and was a visiting postdoctoral fellow at the laboratory of John O'Keefe at the University College, London for two months.

== Career ==
Moser returned to Norway in 1996 to be appointed associate professor in biological psychology at the Department of Psychology at the Norwegian University of Science and Technology (NTNU) in Trondheim. He was promoted to full professor of neuroscience in 1998. Moser is also head of department of the NTNU Institute for Systems Neuroscience.

Moser is founding director/co-director of three Research Council-funded centres of excellence:

- Centre for the Biology of Memory (2002-2012)
- Centre for Neural Computation (2012-2022)
- Centre for Algorithms in the Cortex (2023-2033)

In 2007 the centres became a Kavli Institute for Systems Neuroscience, with Moser as director.

as of May 2024 is a professor at the Norwegian University of Science and Technology (NTNU) in Trondheim.

== Research ==
In 2005, he and his then-wife May-Britt Moser discovered grid cells in the brain's medial entorhinal cortex. Grid cells are specialized neurons that provide the brain with a coordinate system and a metric for space. In 2018, he discovered a neural network that expresses a person's sense of time in experiences and memories located in the brain's lateral entorhinal cortex.

He shared the Nobel Prize in Physiology or Medicine in 2014 with long-term collaborator and then-wife May-Britt Moser, and previous mentor John O'Keefe for their work identifying the brain's positioning system. The two main components of the brain's GPS are; grid cells and place cells, a specialized type of neuron that respond to specific locations in space. Together with May-Britt Moser he established the Moser research environment, which they lead.

== Other activities ==
He is a member of the Royal Norwegian Society of Sciences and Letters, Norwegian Academy of Science and Letters, the American Philosophical Society, and the Norwegian Academy of Technological Sciences.

In 2015 he became an external scientific member of the Max Planck Institute of Neurobiology, with which he has collaborated over several years.

He is also an honorary professor at the Centre for Cognitive and Neural Systems at the University of Edinburgh Medical School.

Moser has been a member of the board of reviewing editors in science since 2004 and he has been reviewing editor for Journal of Neuroscience since 2005. He chaired the programme committee of the European Neuroscience meeting (FENS Forum) in 2006.

== Awards and recognition ==
- 1999: Prize for young scientists awarded by the Royal Norwegian Society of Sciences and Letters
- 2005: 28th annual W. Alden Spencer Award (College of Physicians and Surgeons of Columbia University)
- 2006: 14th Betty and David Koetser Award for Brain Research (University of Zürich)
- 2006: 10th Prix "Liliane Bettencourt pour les Sciences du Vivant" 2006 (Fondation Bettencourt, Paris)
- 2008: 30th Eric K. Fernström's Great Nordic Prize (Fernström Foundation, University of Lund)
- 2011: Louis-Jeantet Prize for Medicine
- 2011: Anders Jahre Award for Medical Research (with May-Britt Moser)
- 2012: Perl-UNC Neuroscience Prize (with May-Britt Moser)
- 2013: Louisa Gross Horwitz Prize (with May-Britt Moser and John O'Keefe)
- 2014: Karl Spencer Lashley Award (with May-Britt Moser)
- 2014: Foreign associate of the National Academy of Sciences.
- 2014: Körber European Science Prize
- 2014: Nobel Prize in Physiology or Medicine (with May-Britt Moser and John O'Keefe)
- 2018: Grand Cross of the Order of St. Olav (with May-Britt Moser)

== Selected publications ==
- Moser, E.I., Mathiesen, I. & Andersen, P. (1993). Association between brain temperature and dentate field potentials in exploring and swimming rats. Science, 259, 1324–1326.
- Brun, V.H., Otnæss, M.K., Molden, S., Steffenach, H.-A., Witter, M.P., Moser, M.-B., Moser, E.I. (2002). Place cells and place representation maintained by direct entorhinal-hippocampal circuitry. Science, 296, 2089–2284.
- Fyhn, M., Molden, S., Witter, M.P., Moser, E.I. and Moser, M.-B. (2004). Spatial representation in the entorhinal cortex.Science, 305, 1258–1264.
- Leutgeb, S., Leutgeb, J.K., Treves, A., Moser, M.-B. and Moser, E.I. (2004). Distinct ensemble codes in hippocampal areas CA3 and CA1. Science, 305, 1295–1298.
- Leutgeb, S., Leutgeb, J.K., Barnes, C.A., Moser, E.I., McNaughton, B.L., and Moser, M.-B (2005). Independent codes for spatial and episodic memory in the hippocampus. Science, 309, 619–623.
- Hafting, T., Fyhn, M., Molden, S., Moser, M.-B., and Moser, E.I. (2005). Microstructure of a spatial map in the entorhinal cortex.Nature, 436, 801–806.
- Colgin, L.L, and Moser, E.I. (2006). Rewinding the memory record. Nature, 440, 615–617.
- Sargolini, F., Fyhn, M., Hafting, T., McNaughton, B.L., Witter, M.P., Moser, M.-B., and Moser, E.I. (2006). Conjunctive representation of position, direction and velocity in entorhinal cortex. Science, 312, 754–758.
- Leutgeb, J.K., Leutgeb, S., Moser, M.-B., and Moser, E.I. (2007). Pattern separation in dentate gyrus and CA3 of the hippocampus. Science, 315, 961–966.
- Fyhn, M., Hafting, T., Treves, A., Moser, M.-B. and Moser, E.I. (2007). Hippocampal remapping and grid realignment in entorhinal cortex. Nature, 446, 190–194.
- Hafting, T., Fyhn, M., Bonnevie, T., Moser, M.-B. and Moser, E.I. (2008). Hippocampus-independent phase precession in entorhinal grid cells. Nature 453, 1248–1252.
- Kjelstrup, K.B., Solstad, T., Brun, V.H., Hafting, T., Leutgeb, S., Witter, M.P., Moser, E.I. and Moser, M.-B. (2008). Finite scales of spatial representation in the hippocampus. Science 321, 140–143.
- Solstad, T., Boccara, C.N., Kropff, E., Moser, M.-B. and Moser, E.I. (2008). Representation of geometric borders in the entorhinal cortex. Science, 322, 1865–1868.
- Moser, E.I., Moser, M-B. (2011). Crystals of the brain. EMBO Mol. Med. 3, 1–4.
- Moser, E.I., Moser, M-B. (2011). Seeing into the future. Nature, 469, 303–4
- Jezek, K., Henriksen, EJ., Treves, A., Moser, E.I. and Moser, M-B. (2011). Theta-paced flickering between place-cell maps in the hippocampus. Nature, 478, 246–249.
- Giocomo, LM., Moser, E.I., Moser, M-B. (2011) Grid cells use HCN1 channels for spatial scaling. Cell, 147, 1159–1170.
- Igarashi, KM., Lu L., Colgin LL., Moser M-B., Moser EI. (2014) Coordination of entorhinal-hippocampal ensemble activity during associative learning. Nature 510, 143–7.
