= Kavli Institute for the Physics and Mathematics of the Universe =

Research institute in Kashiwa, Japan

- Named after: Kavli Foundation (United States)
- Predecessor: Institute for the Physics and Mathematics of the Universe
- Formation: October 1, 2007; 17 years ago
- Founder: Hitoshi Murayama and the University of Tokyo
- Type: NGO
- Purpose: Scientific research
- Headquarters: Kashiwa, Japan
- Director: Hitoshi Murayama
- Website: https://www.ipmu.jp/en

The Kavli Institute for the Physics and Mathematics of the Universe (IPMU) is an international research institute for physics and mathematics situated in Kashiwa, Japan, near Tokyo. Its full name is "Kavli Institute for the Physics and Mathematics of the Universe, The University of Tokyo Institutes for Advanced Study, the University of Tokyo, Kashiwa, Japan". It is one of 20 Kavli Institutes.

The main subjects of study at IPMU are particle physics, high energy physics, astrophysics, astronomy and mathematics. The institute addresses five key questions: "How did the universe begin? What is its fate? What is it made of? What are its fundamental laws? Why do we exist?"

== History ==
The Institute for the Physics and Mathematics of the Universe was created on October 1, 2007, by its founding director Hitoshi Murayama and the University of Tokyo. It is funded by the Japanese Ministry of Science, as a part of their World Premier International Research Center Initiative. In 2012, the IPMU received an endowment from the Kavli Foundation and was renamed the Kavli Institute for the Physics and Mathematics of the Universe.

== Members of IPMU ==
Many notable scientists are employed at the IPMU. Among them:

- Takaaki Kajita
- Mikhail Kapranov
- Stavros Katsanevas
- Young-Kee Kim
- Toshiyuki Kobayashi
- Hitoshi Murayama
- Hiraku Nakajima
- Yasunori Nomura
- Hirosi Ooguri
- David Spergel
- Yuji Tachikawa

== See also ==
- Kavli Institute for Particle Astrophysics and Cosmology
- Kavli Institute for Theoretical Physics
