= May-Britt Moser =

Norwegian psychologist and neuroscientist (born 1963)

May-Britt Moser FRS
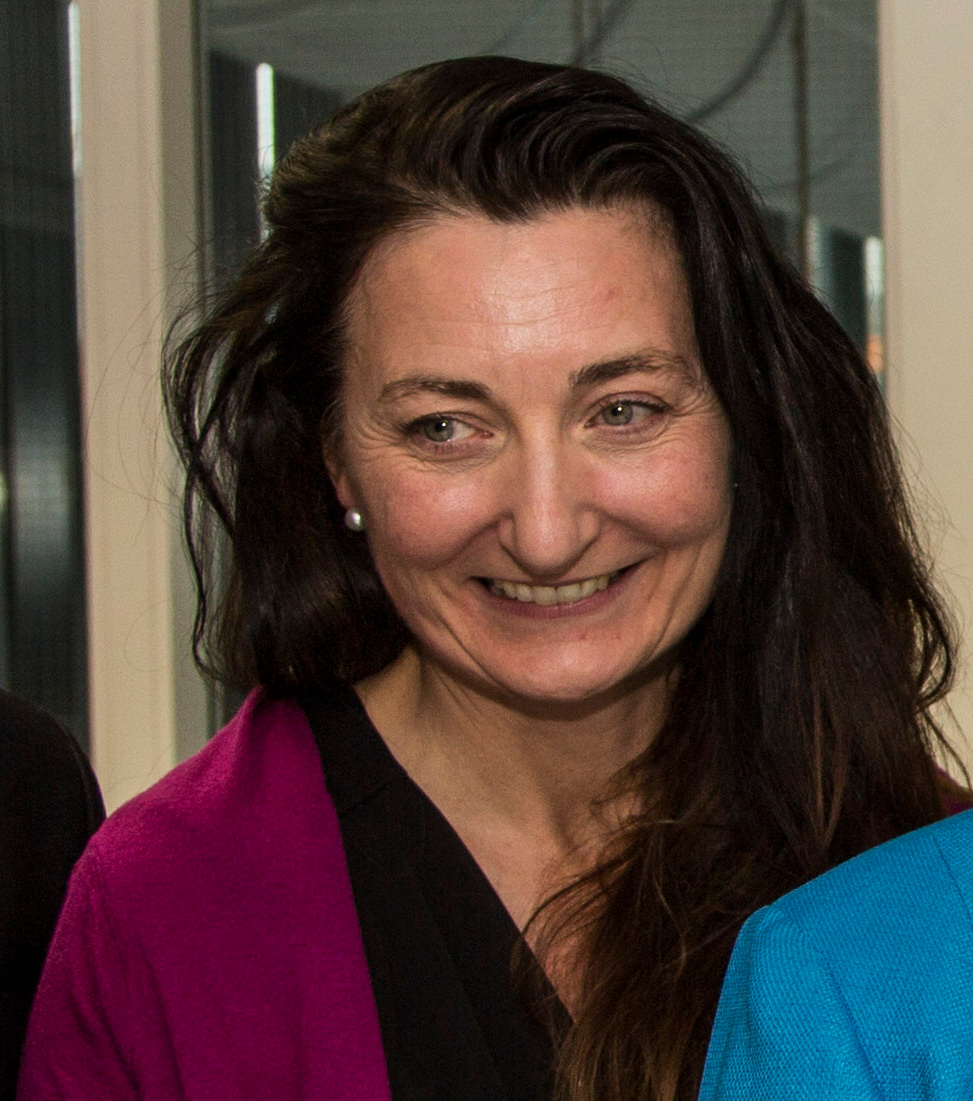
- Moser in 2014. (Photographer: Henrik Fjørtoft / NTNU Communication Division)
- Born: May-Britt Andreassen; 1963 (age 62–63); Fosnavåg, Norway
- Citizenship: Norwegian
- Education: University of Oslo
- Known for: Grid cells, Neurons
- Spouse: Edvard Moser (1985–2016)
- Children: 2
- Awards: Louis-Jeantet Prize for Medicine (2011); Nobel Prize in Physiology or Medicine (2014)
- Scientific career
- Fields: Neuroscience, Psychology
- Workplaces: Norwegian University of Science and Technology; University of Edinburgh
- Doctoral advisor: Per Andersen
- Doctoral students: Marianne Fyhn

May-Britt Moser FRS (born 1963) is a Norwegian psychologist and neuroscientist, who is a Professor of Psychology and Neuroscience at the Norwegian University of Science and Technology (NTNU). She and her former husband, Edvard Moser, shared half of the 2014 Nobel Prize in Physiology or Medicine, awarded for work concerning the grid cells in the entorhinal cortex, as well as several additional space-representing cell types in the same circuit that make up the positioning system in the brain.

Together with Edvard Moser she established the Moser research environment at NTNU, which they lead. Since 2023 she has headed the Centre for Algorithms in the Cortex.

Moser received her education as a psychologist at the Department of Psychology, University of Oslo and obtained a PhD in neurophysiology at the Faculty of Medicine in 1995; in 1996 she was appointed as associate professor in biological psychology at the Department of Psychology at the Norwegian University of Science and Technology (NTNU); she was promoted to professor of neuroscience in 2000. In 2002 her research group was given the status of a separate "centre of excellence".

== Early life and education ==
May-Britt Moser was born in the small town of Fosnavåg, Møre og Romsdal, Norway, in 1963, the youngest of five children. Although her family owned a small farm, her father worked as a carpenter. This meant that her mother was mainly responsible for caring for the farm. A self-proclaimed "tom-boy," May-Britt was born into a family without excess money, meaning that she did not have the means to travel in the summer. With her free time, she chose to study animals where she found a major passion. May-Britt's mother told her fairytales while she was growing up and always encouraged her to work hard to make her dreams come true. As a child, May-Britt wanted to become a doctor who traveled the world saving people, or even a veterinarian due to her love of animals. She was never a particularly gifted student in grade school, but the right level of encouragement from her teachers saw her talents flourish. Also, her mother - who incidentally herself had nursed a dream of becoming a physician - imposed upon May-Britt that she had to get good grades, lest she have no alternative besides getting a home economics education and end up as a housewife.

Moser attended the University of Oslo where she studied psychology, mathematics, and neurobiology. May-Britt chose this school because two of her sisters lived in the Oslo area and provided her with a temporary place to live. She enjoyed the freedom of university, but was not completely sure what she wanted to do with her degree. She was accepted into dentistry school, but declined the offer. May-Britt soon met Edvard I. Moser, whom she recognized from her high school. The couple married on July 27, 1985, and decided to study the relationship between the brain and behavior. In June 1991, the couple had their first child, Isabel. They found it difficult to balance a PhD program with having a child, but their passion for their studies fueled them to bring their daughter along for long days in the lab. Ailin was born in 1995. Later that year, May-Britt Moser obtained a doctorate in neurophysiology for her work recognizing correlations between the structure of the hippocampus and spatial recognition within rats. May-Britt Moser and her husband traveled briefly to the University of Edinburgh to work with Richard Morris, a neuroscientist. They later visited University College London, where they worked in O' Keefe's laboratory. The couple eventually decided to work at Norwegian University of Science and Technology in Trondheim, where May-Britt became a professor of neuroscience and director of the University's Center for Neural Computation. The couple announced their divorce in 2016, but still continue their scientific work together.

== Career ==
Moser was awarded a degree in psychology at the Department of Psychology at the University of Oslo in 1990. She was then employed as a research fellow at the Faculty of Medicine, where she was awarded her Ph.D. in Neurophysiology in 1995 at the age of 32, under the supervision of professor Per Andersen. She and Edvard Moser went on to undertake postdoctoral training with Richard Morris at the Centre for Neuroscience, University of Edinburgh from 1994 to 1996, and were visiting postdoctoral fellows at the laboratory of John O'Keefe at the University College, London for two months.

The Mosers returned to Norway in 1996 where May-Britt was appointed associate professor in biological psychology at the Department of Psychology at the Norwegian University of Science and Technology (NTNU) in Trondheim. She was promoted to a position as full professor of neuroscience at NTNU in 2000. The couple were instrumental in the establishment of the Centre for the Biology of Memory (CBM) in 2002 and the Institute for Systems Neuroscience at NTNU in 2007. Moser is also head of department of the NTNU Centre for Neural Computation. She also is a member of the Royal Norwegian Society of Sciences and Letters, Norwegian Academy of Science and Letters, the American Philosophical Society, and the Norwegian Academy of Technological Sciences. Moser was appointed by the European Research Council as a member of one of the evaluation panels for ERC startup grants for the period 2007–2009.

The Mosers pioneered research on the brain's mechanism for representing space together with their mentor John O'Keefe. The Mosers discovered types of cells that are important for determining position (spatial representation) close to the hippocampus, an area deep in the brain that is important for encoding of space, and also for episodic memory. Moser investigated correlations between the anatomical structure of the hippocampus and social learning in rats. Moser's work gave the ability for scientists to gain new knowledge into the cognitive processes and spatial deficits associated with human neurological conditions such as Alzheimer's disease.

In 2013, the Trondheim Chamber of Commerce awarded Moser the Madame Beyer award, which recognizes brilliant female business leaders. It was awarded in recognition of Moser's robust leadership, scientific achievements, and her high ethical standards, as well as her consistent focus on teamwork and community spirit.

In 2014, the Mosers shared half of the 2014 Nobel Prize in Physiology or Medicine. The other half of the prize was awarded to John O'Keefe. The Mosers are one of six couples to be awarded a Nobel Prize.

May-Britt Moser was a co-Founder of the Centre for the Biology of Memory, a Research Council of Norway-funded Centre of Excellence from 2003 to 2012. From 2013 to 2022 Moser was a Founding Director of the Centre for Neural Computation, a second Centre of Excellence, and from 2023 the Founding Director of a third Centre of Excellence, Centre for Algoritms in the Cortex.

== Honours ==
- 1999: Prize for young scientists awarded by the Royal Norwegian Society of Sciences and Letters
- 2005: 28th annual W. Alden Spencer Award (College of Physicians and Surgeons of Columbia University)
- 2006: 14th Betty and David Koetser Award for Brain Research (University of Zürich)
- 2006: 10th Prix "Liliane Bettencourt pour les Sciences du Vivant" 2006 (Fondation Bettencourt, Paris)
- 2008: 30th Eric K. Fernström’s Great Nordic Prize (Fernström Foundation, University of Lund)
- 2011: Louis-Jeantet Prize for Medicine
- 2011: Anders Jahre Award for Medical Research (with Edvard Moser)
- 2012: Perl-UNC Neuroscience Prize (with Edvard Moser)
- 2013: Louisa Gross Horwitz Prize (with Edvard Moser and John O'Keefe)
- 2014: Karl Spencer Lashley Award (with Edvard Moser)
- 2014: Körber European Science Prize
- 2014: Nobel Prize in Physiology or Medicine (with Edvard Moser and John O'Keefe)
- 2016: Erna Hamburger Prize, EPFL, WISH Foundation, Lausanne, Switzerland
- 2018: Grand Cross of the Order of St. Olav

== Selected publications ==
- List of publications by May-Britt Moser in BIBSYS (Norway)
- List of publications by May-Britt Moser in CRIStin
- Brun, V.H., Otnæss, M.K., Molden, S., Steffenach, H.-A., Witter, M.P., Moser, M.-B., Moser, E.I. (2002). "Place cells and place representation maintained by direct entorhinal-hippocampal circuitry". Science, 296, 2089–2284.
- Fyhn, M., Molden, S., Witter, M.P., Moser, E.I. and Moser, M.-B. (2004). "Spatial representation in the entorhinal cortex". Science, 305, 1258–1264.
- Leutgeb, S., Leutgeb, J.K., Treves, A., Moser, M.-B. and Moser, E.I. (2004). "Distinct ensemble codes in hippocampal areas CA3 and CA1". Science, 305, 1295–1298.
- Leutgeb, S., Leutgeb, J.K., Barnes, C.A., Moser, E.I., McNaughton, B.L., and Moser, M.-B (2005). "Independent codes for spatial and episodic memory in the hippocampus". Science, 309, 619–623.
- Hafting, T., Fyhn, M., Molden, S., Moser, M.-B., and Moser, E.I. (2005). "Microstructure of a spatial map in the entorhinal cortex". Nature, 436, 801–806.
- Sargolini, F., Fyhn, M., Hafting, T., McNaughton, B.L., Witter, M.P., Moser, M.-B., and Moser, E.I. (2006). "Conjunctive representation of position, direction and velocity in entorhinal cortex". Science, 312, 754–758.
- Leutgeb, J.K., Leutgeb, S., Moser, M.-B., and Moser, E.I. (2007). "Pattern separation in dentate gyrus and CA3 of the hippocampus". Science, 315, 961–966.
- Fyhn, M., Hafting, T., Treves, A., Moser, M.-B. and Moser, E.I. (2007). "Hippocampal remapping and grid realignment in entorhinal cortex". Nature, 446, 190–194.
- Hafting, T., Fyhn, M., Bonnevie, T., Moser, M.-B. and Moser, E.I. (2008). "Hippocampus-independent phase precession in entorhinal grid cells". Nature 453, 1248–1252.
- Kjelstrup, K.B., Solstad, T., Brun, V.H., Hafting, T., Leutgeb, S., Witter, M.P., Moser, E.I. and Moser, M.-B. (2008). "Finite scales of spatial representation in the hippocampus". Science 321, 140–143.
- Solstad, T., Boccara, C.N., Kropff, E., Moser, M.-B. and Moser, E.I. (2008). "Representation of geometric borders in the entorhinal cortex". Science, 322, 1865–1868.
- Moser, E.I., Moser, M.-B. (2011). "Crystals of the brain". EMBO Mol. Med. 3, 1-4.
- Moser, E.I., Moser, M.-B. (2011). "Seeing into the future". Nature, 469, 303–304
- Jezek, K., Henriksen, EJ., Treves, A., Moser, E.I. and Moser, M.-B. (2011). "Theta-paced flickering between place-cell maps in the hippocampus". Nature, 478, 246–249.
- Giocomo, LM., Moser, E.I., Moser, M.-B. (2011) "Grid cells use HCN1 channels for spatial scaling". Cell, 147, 1159–1170.
- Stensola, Hanne; Stensola, Tor; Solstad, Trygve; Frøland, Kristian; Moser, May-Britt; Moser, Edvard Ingjald. (2012) The entorhinal grid map is discretized. Nature. volum 492 (7427).
- Bonnevie, Tora; Dunn, Benjamin Adric; Fyhn, Marianne; Hafting, Torkel; Derdikman, Dori Moshe; Kubie, J. L.; Roudi, Yasser; Moser, Edvard Ingjald; Moser, May-Britt. (2013) Grid cells require excitatory drive from the hippocampus. Nature Neuroscience. volum 16 (3).
- Couey, Jonathan Jay; Witoelar, Aree Widya; Zhang, Sheng Jia; Zheng, Kang; Ye, Jing; Dunn, Benjamin Adric; Czajkowski, Rafal; Moser, May-Britt; Moser, Edvard Ingjald; Roudi, Yasser; Witter, Menno. (2013) Recurrent inhibitory circuitry as a mechanism for grid formation. Nature Neuroscience. volum 16 (3).
- Lu, Li; Leutgeb, Jill Kristin; Tsao, Albert; Henriksen, Espen Joakim; Leutgeb, Stefan; Barnes, Carol; Witter, Menno; Moser, May-Britt; Moser, Edvard Ingjald. (2013) Impaired hippocampal rate coding after lesions of the lateral entorhinal cortex. Nature Neuroscience. volum 16 (8).
- Moser, Edvard Ingjald; Moser, May-Britt. (2013) Grid Cells and Neural Coding in High-End Cortices. Neuron. volum 80 (3).
- Rowland, David Clayton; Moser, May-Britt. (2013) Time Finds Its Place in the Hippocampus. Neuron. volum 78 (6).
- Tsao, Albert; Moser, May-Britt; Moser, Edvard Ingjald. (2013) Traces of Experience in the Lateral Entorhinal Cortex. Current Biology. volum 23 (5).
- Zhang, Sheng Jia; Ye, Jing; Miao, Chenglin; Tsao, Albert; Cerniauskas, Ignas; Ledergerber, Debora; Moser, May-Britt; Moser, Edvard Ingjald. (2013) Optogenetic Dissection of Entorhinal-Hippocampal Functional Connectivity. Science. volum 340 (6128).

== See also ==
- Timeline of women in science
