= Harvard Institute for International Development =

Center within Harvard University, US

Coordinates: 42.370956°N 71.121997°W

- Formation: 1974
- Dissolved: 2000
- Type: Think tank, consultancy
- Location: Cambridge, Massachusetts, US
- Official language: English
- Parent organization: Harvard University

The Harvard Institute for International Development (HIID) was a think tank dedicated to helping nations join the global economy, operating between 1974 and 2000. It was a center within Harvard University, United States.

== Foundation and leadership ==
The Harvard Institute for International Development originated when Harvard University's Center for International Affairs (CFIA) tried to move away from a controversial role in giving advice on topics such as arms control, foreign aid and development. The CFIA preferred a more academic role of teaching and research. The Ford Foundation and other organizations involved in aid-giving still wanted Harvard to provide hands-on training for their staff. In 1962 the Development Advisory Service was established for this purpose, associated with the CFIA but independent. It was renamed the HIID in 1974.

In 1980 the economist Arnold Harberger of the Harvard University was selected as head of the institute. The announcement met with protests from students and staff since Harberger had previously advised the Augusto Pinochet military regime in Chile. He withdrew and Dwight Perkins, an economist and specialist in China, took the job. After the collapse of the Soviet Union, the economist Jeffrey Sachs became head of the institute.

== Development programs ==
The HIID became the umbrella organization for overseas aid and development programs led by the university but funded by the government or foundations. The HIID coordinated development assistance, training, and research on Africa, Asia, Central and Eastern Europe, and Latin America. The Institute helped developing nations to achieve economic growth and improve their people's welfare. The institute provided staff for various development projects. For example, in the late 1970s David Korten headed a project funded by the Ford Foundation to assist in organization and management of national family-planning programs. In 1991 the HIID launched a program called WorldTeach that sent college student and graduates to schools in developing countries for a one-year assignment. Countries that had requested volunteers were Costa Rica, Ecuador, Namibia, South Africa, Poland, Thailand and China.

== Research ==
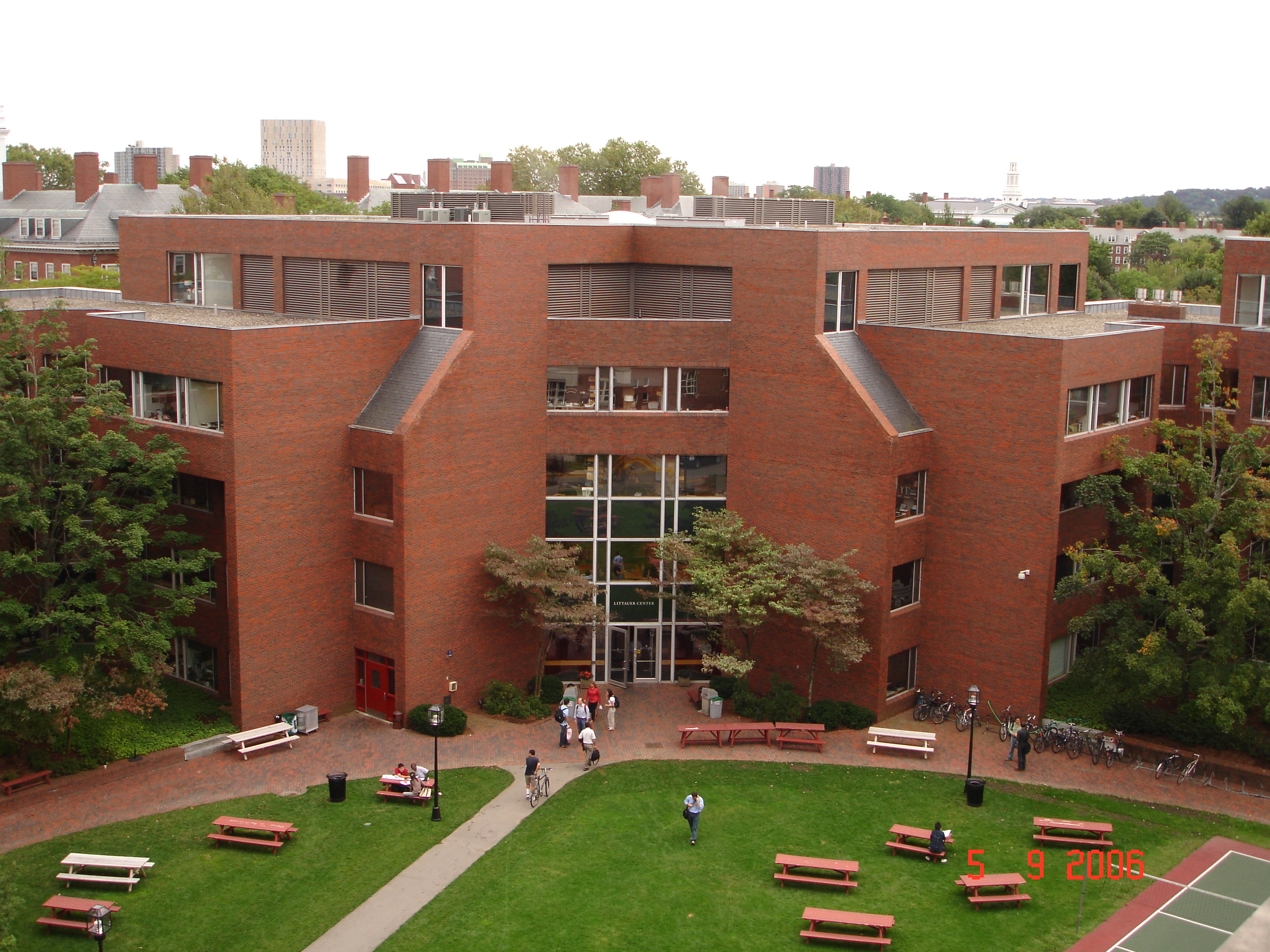
Littauer Building, John F. Kennedy School of Government, home of the HIID

The HIID undertook many research projects related to international development. For example, in the early 1980s, the HIID undertook a study of several of Indonesia's national development programs, including grants for village development, schools, family planning and rice yield improvement programs. The programs had been running for some time, but the study uncovered a number of anomalies that were affecting their efficiency. The HIID collaborated with the Women In Development office of USAID in developing the Harvard Analytical Framework, also called the Gender Roles Framework, one of the earliest frameworks for understanding differences between men and women in their participation in the economy. This has great importance in helping policy makers understand the economic case for allocating resources to women as well as men. The framework was described in 1984.

In 1987, the International Tropical Timber Organization commissioned HIID to prepare a review of current knowledge of multiple-use management of tropical hardwood forests. Of interest was the potential for non-timber products and services that could assist in sustaining the forests. HIID completed the study in 1988 and issued updated versions in 1990 and 1992. Research published in 1989 described the effects of price controls in emerging economies in creating parallel or black markets. As Ukraine started the transition towards a market economy in the early 1990s, the HIID supported a survey on barter in transition economies.

In 1993, the HIID managed an education sector assessment in El Salvador under contract from USAID, the purpose being to obtain reliable information for use in setting a national educational policy. The HIID and the Geneva-based World Economic Forum jointly produced the 1997 Global Competitiveness Report based on a late-1996 survey of 2,827 firms in 53 countries. Among other questions, respondents were asked to say how often they saw evidence of corruption, and the answers were used to rank each country.

In mid-1998 the World Economic Forum and HIID assembled a team of experts to determine the causes of the Asian financial crisis and the mechanisms of the crisis, to determine methods of reducing the probability of similar crises in the future and to identify policy changes that would help the affected countries resume growth. In the late 1990s, USAID sponsored the Equity and Growth through Economic Research (EAGER) project, with the HIID commissioning work in eleven African countries. Both public strategies for growth and trade regimes for growth had both been intensively studied in the past, but resulting reforms had met little success. The focus of the EAGER research was to understand why programs had not been sustained, and what could be done to change that. The above are just examples of the many research projects undertaken by the Institute.

== Russian aid controversy ==
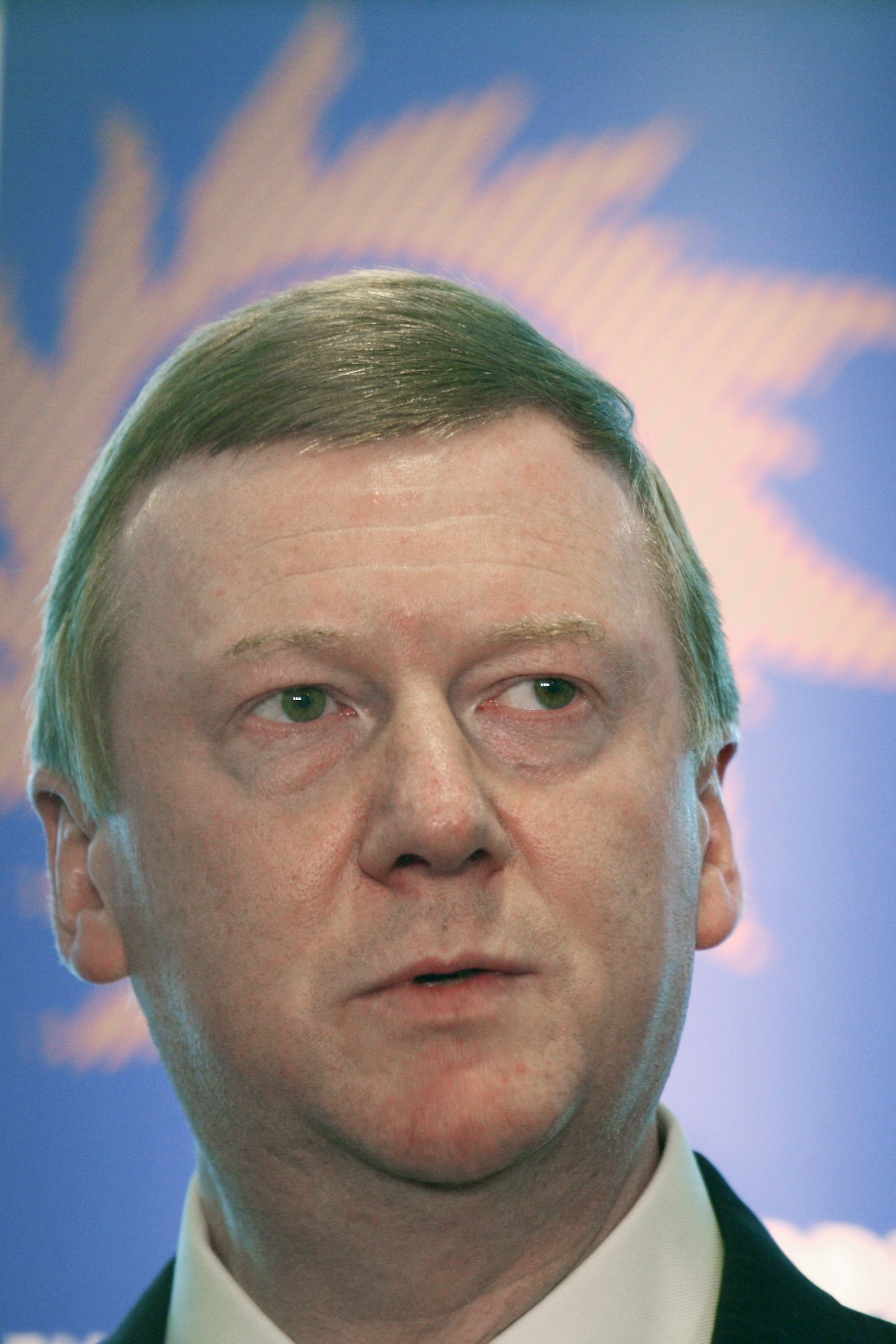
Anatoly Borisovich Chubais, who worked closely with HIID advisers in Russia

With the collapse of the Soviet Union, the United States Agency for International Development (USAID) funded a project by the HIID to help rebuild the Russian economy on the basis of western concepts of ethics, democracy and free markets. Jeffrey Sachs was said to have "packaged HIID as an AID consultant". USAID were glad to accept help from Harvard, since they lacked expertise for such a project. The HIID oversaw and guided disbursement of $300 million of US aid to Russia with little oversight by USAID. HIID advisers worked closely with representatives from Russia, notably Anatoly Chubais and his associates. Once USAID accepted help from the HIID, HIID was in a position to recommend U.S. aid policies while being a recipient of that aid. It also put the HIID in a position of power overseeing some of their competitors. The project, which ran from 1992 to 1997, was headed by economist Andrei Shleifer and lawyer Jonathan Hay. HIID received $40.4 million in return for its activities in Russia, awarded without the normal competitive bidding approach.

In 1996 the US Congress asked the General Accounting Office to investigate the HIID activities in the Russian aid program after multiple complaints to the congressional office had been made. The initial published GAO report considered the USAID's oversight over Harvard's Russia project "lax." The US government attempted to hold the Harvard players responsible for their clear conflicts of interest and undeniable misuse of government money but action was slow to ensue. The original GAO report was critical, and further funding was withdrawn from HIID on the basis that as a contractor HIID has "abused the trust of the U.S. government by using personal relationships for private gain".

in 1997, the USAID ended a $14 million grant to the Harvard Institute for International Development after Andrei Shleifer was accused of using the institute to help his wife Nancy Zimmerman's investments in Russia. As part of a settlement, Zimmerman subsequently paid $1.5 million to the USG through one of her companies, Farallon Fixed Income Associates.

In September 2000, Shleifer and Hay were accused by the Justice Department of making personal investments in Russia, and therefore failing to act as impartial advisers. The episode became a factor in the dismissal of Larry Summers, who had set up the project as deputy secretary of the treasury under President Bill Clinton.

== Dissolution ==
The President of the institute from 1995, Jeffrey Sachs, resigned in 1999 to form the Center for International Development (CID), which would focus more on academic research than on consulting. The CID was founded as a joint project of the John F. Kennedy School of Government and the HIID. A task force was appointed in July 1999 to review the future of the HIID, which in January 2000 concluded that it should be dissolved, with its functions distributed to faculties within the University. Reasons included the Russian conflict of interest scandal, structural problems and financial deficits in 1998 and 1999. In 2005, the university was required to pay the US government a settlement of $26.5 million for their involvement in the Russian development scandal. The CID, housed at the Harvard Kennedy School, is now Harvard's primary center for research on international development.

== Selected publications ==
The institute began issuing a series of Development Discussion Papers soon after it began operation, and eventually published more than 700 papers by HIID staff members documenting their project experience and research results. Sub-series covered agriculture and food policy, education, taxation, economic reform and the environment. The HIID also published some full-length books that covered broader topics. Examples:

- Dwight Heald Perkins; Michael Roemer (1991). Reforming economic systems in developing countries. Harvard Institute for International Development. ISBN 0-674-75319-4.
- Dwight Heald Perkins, ed. (1997). Assisting development in a changing world: the Harvard Institute for International Development, 1980–1995. Harvard Institute for International Development. ISBN 0-674-04997-7.
- David L. Lindauer; Hanʼguk Kaebal Yŏnʼguwŏn (1997). The strains of economic growth: labor unrest and social dissatisfaction in Korea. Harvard Institute for International Development. ISBN 0-674-83981-1.
- Richard D. Mallon (2000). The new missionaries: memoirs of a foreign adviser in less-developed countries. Harvard Institute for International Development. ISBN 0-674-00348-9.

== Notable alumni ==
- Ronald MacLean Abaroa, mayor of La Paz, Bolivia
- Betty Oyella Bigombe, Uganda government minister and consultant to the World Bank
- Leonor Briones, treasurer of the Philippines 1998–2001
- Richard A. Cash, American global health researcher
- Zéphirin Diabré, opposition political leader in Burkina Faso
- John C. Edmunds, professor of Finance
- John Luke Gallup, American economist
- Rachel Glennerster, executive director of the Abdul Latif Jameel Poverty Action Lab
- Mauricio Bailón González, general director of the General Directorate of International Affairs of the Secretariat of Health of México
- Grace Goodell, professor of International Development
- Christopher A. Hartwell, president, Center for Social and Economic Research (CASE) in Warsaw
- Jonathan Hay, on site general director of the HIID program in Russia
- Catharine Bond Hill, president of Vassar College
- David Korten, economist, author and political activist
- David Laro, senior judge of the United States Tax Court
- Nabiel Makarim, HIID policy analyst 1986–1989, Indonesia's State Minister of the Environment 2001–2004
- Alex Matthiessen, environmentalist
- Geoffrey Maynard, economist, British Treasury
- Basile Adjou Moumouni, Beninese physician, winner of the 1968 Presidential election, later annulled
- Arunma Oteh, director general of the Nigerian Security and Exchange Commission
- Catherine Overholt, co-developer of the Harvard Analytical Framework
- Fernando Reimers, professor of International Education
- Sócrates Rizzo, mayor of Monterrey (1989–1991) and governor of Nuevo León (1991–1996)
- Jeffrey Sachs, economist, director of the institute 1995–1999
- Soumodip Sarkar, economist and management researcher
- Andrei Shleifer, Russian American economist
- Alejandro Toledo, affiliated researcher 1991–1994, later president of Peru
- Clay G Wescott, American consultant and anti-corruption specialist
