= Congestion pricing in New York City =

Fee for vehicles entering part of Manhattan

Map of the congestion pricing zone

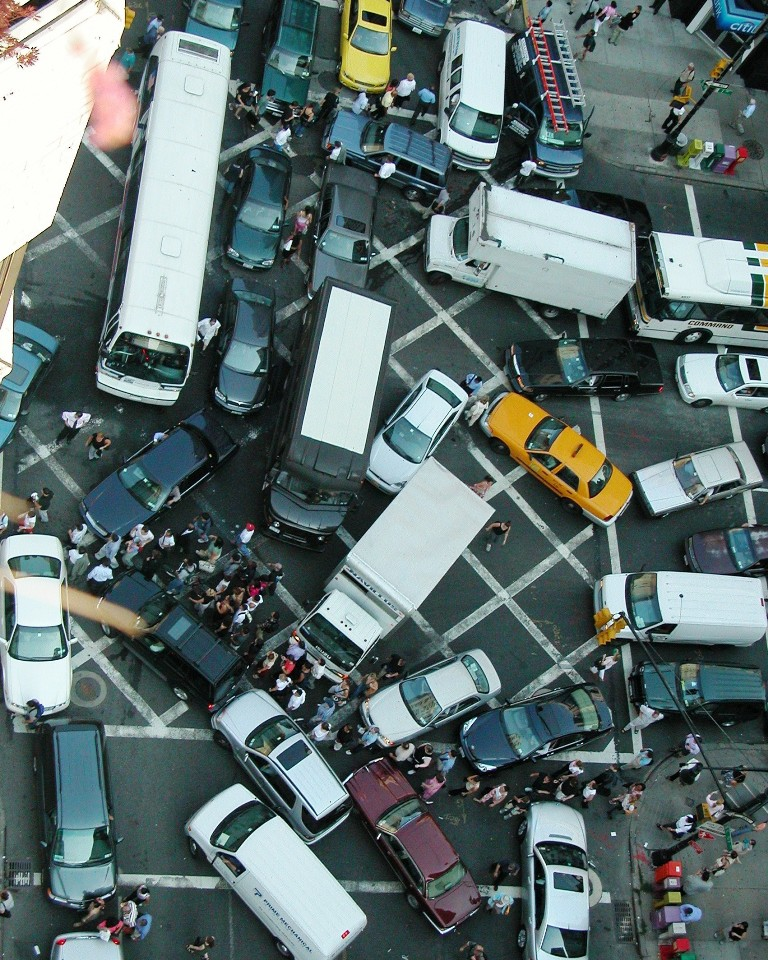
Bird's eye view of Manhattan grid-lock

Congestion pricing in New York City, also known as the Central Business District Tolling Program or CBDTP, began on January 5, 2025. It applies to most motor vehicular traffic using the central business district area of Manhattan south of 61st Street, known as the Congestion Relief Zone, in an effort to encourage commuters to use public transportation instead. Intended to cut down on traffic congestion and pollution, it was first proposed in 2007 and was included in the 2019 New York State government budget by the New York State Legislature. Tolls are collected electronically and vary depending on the time of day, type of vehicle, and whether a vehicle has an E-ZPass toll transponder. The Metropolitan Transportation Authority (MTA) estimates $15 billion in available capital will be generated by bonding revenues from the tolls, which will be available to fund repairs and improvements to the subway, bus, and commuter rail systems.

As of 2024, New York City led the world in urban automobile traffic congestion, despite having a 24/7 rapid transit system. Since the early 20th century, several proposals have been floated for traffic congestion fees or limits for vehicles traveling into or within the Manhattan central business district. A recurring proposal was adding tolls to all crossings of the East River, which separates the borough of Manhattan from the boroughs of Brooklyn and Queens.

In response to the 2017 New York City transit crisis of the MTA, Governor Andrew Cuomo proposed taking advantage of open road tolling technology and providing a revenue stream for the agency. In 2019, following negotiations, Cuomo and New York City Mayor Bill de Blasio agreed to implement congestion pricing to stem the ongoing transit crisis. Federal officials gave final approval to the plan in June 2023, but due to various delays, the rollout was postponed several times. Governor Kathy Hochul indefinitely postponed the plan in June 2024, just before it was planned to go into effect. In November 2024, Hochul revived the toll at a lower price point. Shortly after the toll was implemented, the administration of President Donald Trump revoked federal approval, though a federal judge ruled in 2026 that the revocation was unlawful.

The implementation of congestion pricing led to immediate decreases in private vehicle traffic, and a decrease in transit times for both public and private vehicles. Pedestrian traffic and business in the congestion zone increased, traffic collisions and pedestrian fatalities decreased, and air quality improved.

== Tolling program ==
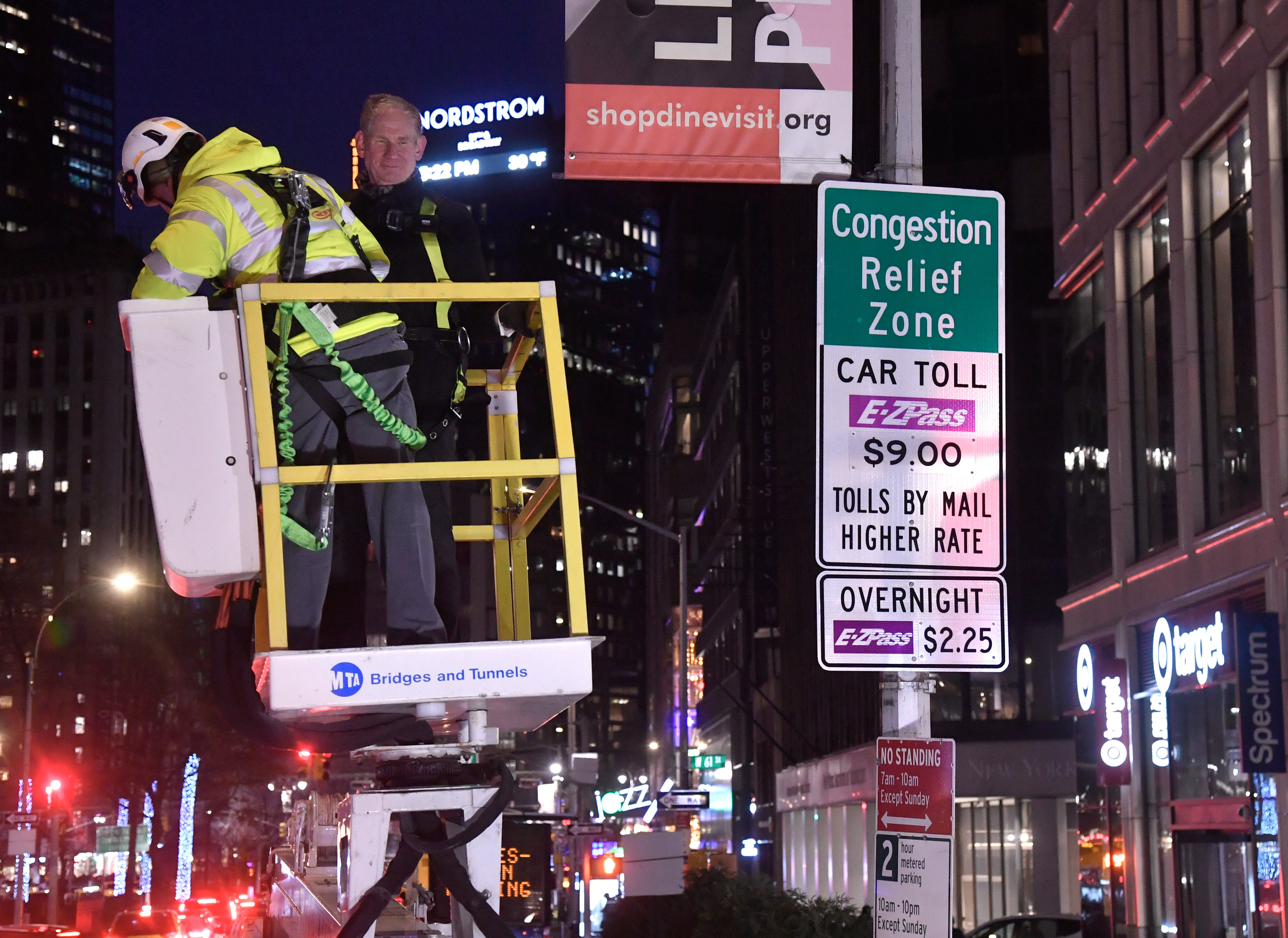
MTA chair and CEO Janno Lieber with the final Congestion Relief Zone sign to be unveiled

The congestion pricing zone includes almost all of Manhattan south of 61st Street. Drivers do not pay a toll if they stay on FDR Drive or the West Side Highway. Drivers on the Brooklyn Bridge and Queensboro Bridge are exempted if they use certain ramps that connected with these highways or outside of the congestion zones. (Note: Drivers traveling westbound on the Queensboro Bridge's northern upper-level roadway, drivers traveling westbound from the Brooklyn Bridge to the northbound FDR Drive, or drivers traveling from FDR Drive to the Brooklyn Bridge eastbound, are exempt from the toll. All other drivers are tolled. Since the Manhattan entrances to the Queensboro Bridge are south of 60th Street, all vehicles using the bridge to leave Manhattan are tolled.) Tolls are not charged for vehicles that use or travel across the excluded roadways for trips beginning and ending in the CBD.

=== Toll rates and exemptions ===
The Traffic Mobility Review Board, which was in charge of suggesting tolls for the congestion zone, recommended in November 2023 that the base toll for passenger vehicles be set at $15, which would be capped at once per day. Under the plan, other classes of vehicles would pay up to $36 once per day, while taxis and for-hire vehicles would pay a fee for each trip into the congestion zone, regardless of how many trips they made. Vehicles using the Holland, Lincoln, Hugh L. Carey, and Queens–Midtown Tunnels (which already charge a separate toll) could receive credits, or discounts, on the congestion toll. No credits would be provided for vehicles using bridges; for example, drivers using the George Washington Bridge pay both the full bridge toll and the full congestion toll. In November 2024, the proposed base toll for passenger vehicles was reduced to $9, capped at once per day.

These toll rates apply during the daytime from 5 a.m. to 9 p.m. on weekdays and from 9 a.m. to 9 p.m. on weekends; tolls are reduced by 75% during nighttime hours, and no credits are provided during that time. On "gridlock alert" days, the MTA had the right to increase base tolls by up to 25%, but as of December 2024, Hochul directed the MTA not to raise tolls on gridlock alert days. The MTA also reserved the right to change the base tolls by as much as 10% for up to a year. All drivers with the E-ZPass transponders linked to their license plate will pay the E-ZPass rate regardless of which state issued their E-ZPass. The rates for drivers without E-ZPasses are 50% more than the E-ZPass rates.

Low-income residents receive a 50% discount on daytime tolls after their first 10 trips into the congestion zone in a calendar month; the discounts reset at the beginning of each month. Toll exemptions are limited to a small number of vehicles, including commuter buses, emergency vehicles, specialized government vehicles, and vehicles transporting disabled riders. Another toll exemption, for people with disabilities and for vehicles transporting disabled passengers, was announced in February 2024. Following discussions in early 2024, the MTA also proposed exemptions for a larger group of government vehicles, as well as school buses and intercity buses. If a vehicle makes multiple trips into the congestion pricing zone in one day, only the first trip into the zone is charged.

E-ZPass base tolls (from 2025 to 2027) (Note: The base rates apply to vehicles with any valid E-ZPass, including E-ZPasses issued outside of New York. Rates for vehicles without E-ZPass are 50 percent higher.)
Vehicle class	Daytime toll (Note: 5:00 am to 9:00 pm weekdays; 9:00 am to 9:00 pm weekends. The toll is only charged once per day, except for taxis and for-hire vehicles, which are charged for every trip that enters the congestion zone.)	Crossing credit at Holland and Lincoln tunnels (Note: The toll charged at the end of each tunnel is equivalent to the daytime congestion toll minus the crossing credit. Vehicles that enter the congestion zone from a bridge or a road north of 60th Street, then use the Queens-Midtown or Hugh L. Carey Tunnels to exit the congestion zone the same day, also receive a crossing credit. A separate toll is charged for using the tunnels themselves.)	Crossing credit at Hugh L. Carey and Queens–Midtown tunnels	Nighttime toll
Passenger cars (including those with commercial plates)	$9.00	($3.00)	($1.50)	$2.25
Motorcycles	$4.50	($1.50)	($0.75)	$1.05
Commuter buses	None	—N/a	—N/a	None
Small buses and small trucks	$14.40	($7.20)	($3.60)	$3.60
Large buses and large trucks	$21.60	($12.00)	($6.00)	$5.40
Yellow taxis, boro taxis, and for-hire black cars	$0.75 per trip			
High-volume for-hire vehicles	$1.50 per trip			

=== Equipment ===
License plate scanners are placed along each street leading to the congestion zone. The scanners, installed by TransCore, are placed on traffic-light poles and on horizontal arms that hang above the streets. There are also scanners above northbound avenues leading away from the congestion zone, but they are to be used only for tracking vehicles, not for charging tolls. Scanners are mounted above FDR Drive and the West Side Highway to determine whether a vehicle has stayed on these highways without entering the congestion zone. Vehicles are charged a toll if successive scanners on these highways no longer detect these vehicles after a certain time period, and if they have not been detected as having exited the zone. Vehicles already in the congestion zone are not tolled, not even if they cross the West Side Highway, unless they exit and re-enter the zone. At the 110 detection points, there are over 1,400 scanners. One third of the scanners are on existing pedestrian walkways, overpasses, and street poles, with the remainder on newly installed gantries.

For each vehicle, the scanners look for an E-ZPass transponder and capture infrared photographs of license plates; the scanners can automatically determine the vehicle type. Infrared scanners were used in place of flash cameras (which are used at MTA Bridges and Tunnels' open road tolling gantries) to prevent light pollution in the surrounding neighborhood. Plates not easily readable by the scanners are subjected to manual image review. The system also uses machine learning to classify vehicles into tolling categories.

== Early plans ==
The Brooklyn, Manhattan, Williamsburg, and Queensboro Bridge across the East River, which separates Long Island from the island of Manhattan, originally had tolls that were removed before the Great Depression. Proposals to toll the bridges again were brought up in 1933, 1952, 1966, 1968, and 1971. In the 1970s, Mayor John Lindsay proposed limiting cars in Lower Manhattan and tolling all crossings of the East River, but Lindsay's successor Abraham Beame subsequently opposed the tolling scheme. Beame's successor Ed Koch attempted to restore limits on vehicles entering Manhattan.

During the late 20th and early 21st centuries, congestion pricing in New York City was proposed several times, without success. A congestion pricing plan was proposed in 2007 by Mayor Michael Bloomberg as a component of PlaNYC, his strategic plan for the city. However, the proposal stalled in the New York State Assembly. Another proposal to implement congestion pricing was suggested by traffic commissioner Sam Schwartz in 2015, but legislation to allow this never passed.

== Approval and implementation efforts ==
=== 2017 proposal ===
As complaints about the city subway's delays and disrepair reached a peak in mid-2017, Governor Andrew Cuomo drafted a congestion pricing proposal with lessons from Bloomberg's handling of the State Legislature. Despite having earlier doubted such a plan's viability, Cuomo described congestion pricing as "an idea whose time has come". London and Stockholm had implemented the concept successfully. Cuomo's plan is expected to differ significantly from Bloomberg's proposal. Its primary intent is to raise funds for city transit and reduce street gridlock, while balancing suburban commuter considerations. The New York Times reflected that Bloomberg's 2008 proposal, which would have raised $500 million annually, could have rectified infrastructure issues and emergency repair schedule affecting the subway in 2017. Cuomo's announcement came after Mayor de Blasio had proposed a millionaire's tax to raise funding for the subway. The plan could be implemented through open road tolling, which records E-ZPass transponders and license plates without forcing the vehicles to slow down significantly. This was in contrast to the circumstances during Bloomberg's tenure, when open road tolling was not widely used yet. At the time, New York City had the third worst traffic congestion of any major city worldwide, behind Moscow and Los Angeles. Shortly after the Governor's announcement, Mayor Bill de Blasio said he did not believe in congestion pricing, and that his plan would be more successful in Albany than the Governor's plan.

In October 2017, the New York State Government created a task force, Fix NYC, to find solutions for fixing mass transit and lowering congestion. The task force was assigned to study traffic on New York City's roadways and report its findings to Cuomo by December. Fix NYC included congestion pricing advocates such as Sam Schwartz, Charles Komanoff, and Alex Matthiessen, who had supported the congestion pricing proposal even after Bloomberg's plan had been defeated. On October 22, 2017, Mayor de Blasio announced a five-point plan to address congestion, including banning rush hour deliveries on specific corridors, implementing new traffic management plans, and deploying emergency vehicles along certain highways to quickly respond to crashes.

==== Initial recommendations ====
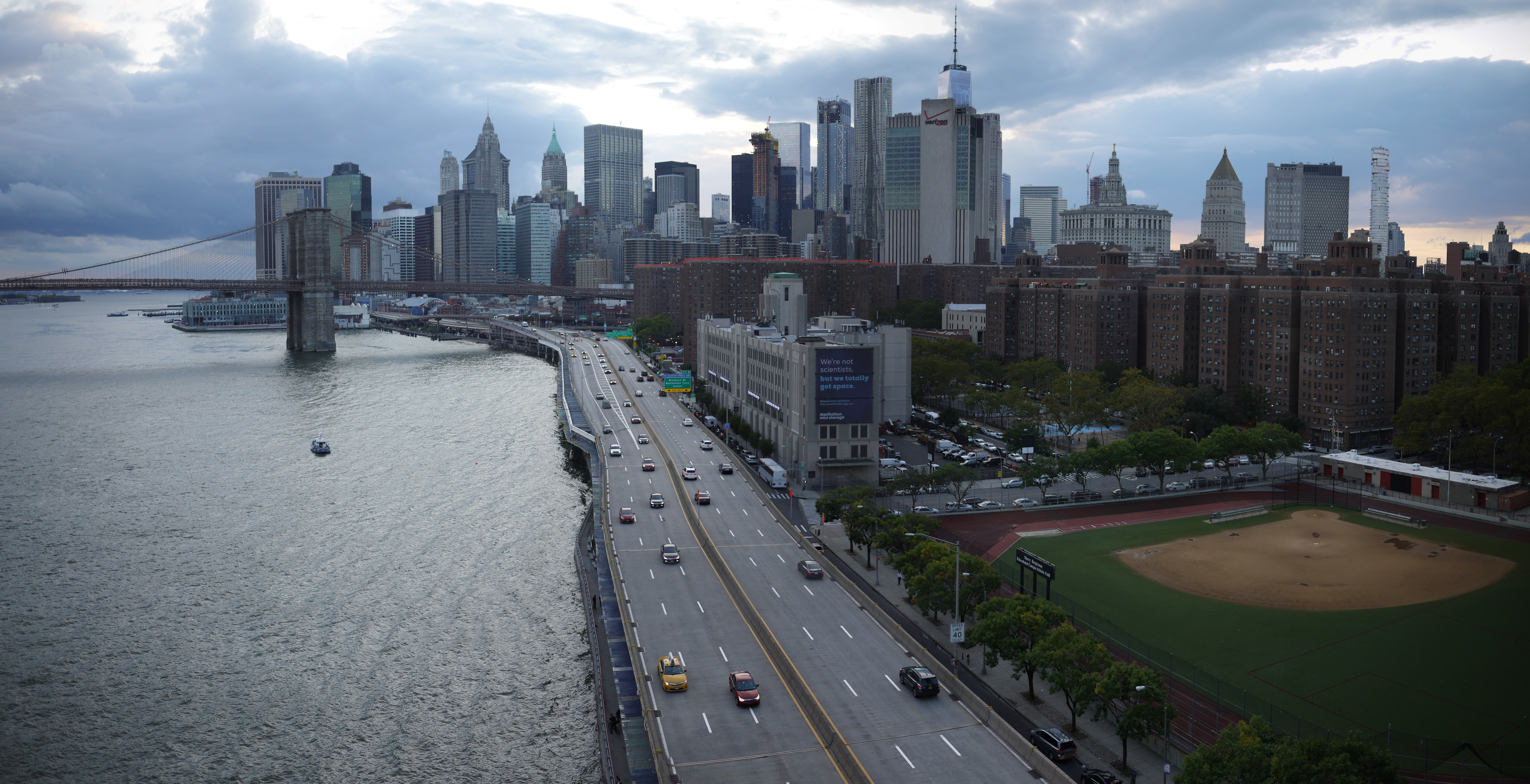
The FDR Drive, one of the few roadways exempted from Fix NYC's 2018 proposal for a congestion toll

On January 16, 2018, in a State of the State address, Cuomo announced more details on his congestion pricing plan. Tolls would be charged in a geographic zone of Manhattan based on the time of day and type of vehicle instead of being placed on bridges. On January 19, the Fix NYC state task force issued its report on how to address congestion, including a proposal for congestion pricing. The report recommended implementing tolls based on time of day and geographical zone. Cars would pay up to $11.52, trucks would pay up to $25.34, and taxis would pay a $2 to $5 surcharge per trip if these vehicles drove into Manhattan's central business district during rush hours. Under the task force's plan, the only drivers who would be able to avoid a toll would be those who cross the Brooklyn Bridge or Queensboro Bridge and then immediately exit onto the FDR Drive once they reach Manhattan. Tolls on taxis and for-hire vehicles would be implemented within a year, and on cars and trucks in 2020. The tolls were estimated to raise up to $1.5 billion a year. The report also found that of the 118,000 people who commuted from the outer boroughs to Manhattan by car, fewer than 5,000 would be considered working poor.

The congestion toll was not included in the state budget that was passed in March 2018. However, a surcharge was levied on taxi, for-hire, and ride-share trips in Manhattan below 96th Street. This consisted of a $2.50 fee for each taxi trip in that area, a $2.75 fee for each privately operated for-hire trip in that area, and a $0.75 fee per rider for each ride-share trip in that area.

In his 2019 State of the State Address in January 2019, Cuomo announced another state budget, which would provisionally include congestion pricing. The following month, on February 26, de Blasio announced his support for congestion pricing during a joint announcement with Cuomo of a plan that outlined ten steps to fix MTA operations. One of these steps called for enacting a form of congestion pricing by December 2020, a plan that both men agreed on for the first time. The revenue would go into a so-called lock box that could only be used by the MTA. In March 2019, Cuomo's congestion pricing plan was again included in the 2019 New York state budget, though specific details still had to be outlined.

==== Final components ====
A congestion pricing proposal in March 2019 was ultimately passed on April 1 as part of the New York State Budget, making New York City the first city in the United States to enact congestion pricing. While there were few details about the proposal, it would include the entire island of Manhattan south of 61st Street, except for the FDR Drive and West Side Highway, as well as the Battery Park Underpass connecting the two highways. Vehicles would be tolled only once per day. The plan would not go into effect until 2021 at the earliest.

As part of the law, the Central Business District Tolling Program would be planned by, implemented by and operated by the Triborough Bridge and Tunnel Authority. The TBTA board was to institute a "traffic mobility review" board, which will consist of a chair and five members, who were to be appointed by the TBTA board. This board was to recommend the toll amounts in late 2020, or no later than 30 days before the implementation of the tolling program. A public hearing was to be held before the board's vote.

The board was to recommend an amount that provides a minimum of $15 billion in funding for the MTA's 2020–2024 Capital Program, not including the costs of the tolling program. This funding will be put into the central business district tolling capital lockbox fund. The majority of the funds, 80%, would be used for the Staten Island Railway, New York City Subway, and MTA Regional Bus Operations, while 10% each would be given to the Long Island Rail Road and Metro-North Railroad. The traffic mobility review board was also granted the power to review the MTA's Capital Program. The board was empowered to recommend tolling exemptions, which would be determined by a traffic study of their impact. Authorized emergency vehicles and qualifying vehicles transporting people with disabilities were not planned to be charged. A plan to address charges on for-hire vehicles was to be implemented by the TBTA. The TBTA, in conjunction with the NYCDOT, was to report on the effects of the tolling program, such as traffic congestion, air quality and emissions, mass transit ridership, and expenditures a year after the implementation of the plan, and every two years afterwards.

The exemption of the West Side Highway and the credit given to drivers using the Henry Hudson Bridge and heading into the congestion zone were added to the plan on March 31, 2019. Electrical toll-taking equipment will have to be installed at the more than 30 exits into the cordon from the West Side Highway, at the 11 exits from the FDR Drive, and at the eight avenues that delineate the northern boundary of the congestion zone at 59th Street/Central Park South. (Note: There are 11 exits on the FDR Drive south of 60th Street. In addition, York, Second, Lexington, Park, Fifth, Ninth, and Eleventh Avenues, and Broadway carry southbound traffic into the congestion zone.) Sam Schwartz suggested enforcing the West Side Highway exemption by process of elimination to reduce the cost of the toll readers. The law also exempted people living in the congestion zone who make less than $60,000 a year by deducting the cost of the tolls from their tax bills. On March 28, 2019, the TBTA issued a request for technology (RFT) for alternate ways to implement the congestion pricing tolling. Options the TBTA included in the RFT are roadside bluetooth readers, connected vehicle technology, smartphone applications, and Global Navigation Satellite System based tolling.

==== Reaction ====
As with the Bloomberg proposal, Queens politicians still opposed Cuomo's proposal because it would potentially add tolls to the remaining free crossings over the East River. David Weprin, a New York State Assemblyman representing parts of Queens, called it "an additional tax on people who drive into Manhattan, often not wealthy people, but middle-class people". He said that much of Queens and many parts of Brooklyn had little access to mass transit, and that disabled residents from all boroughs would also be negatively affected because the subway was generally not accessible to people with disabilities. Bloomberg's successor, Bill de Blasio, also initially opposed congestion pricing. Instead, de Blasio proposed a tax on wealthy residents to fund the subway, even though a similar tax for universal prekindergarten had previously failed in the state legislature. He also clarified that he opposed Cuomo's plan because his tax on millionaires would be more effective in raising money. De Blasio's opposition came as some of his supporters in the 2017 mayoral election announced support for the plan, including the Working Families Party and Union Local 32BJ. Later in August 2017, it was clarified that de Blasio did not oppose congestion pricing specifically, and that his office was to look at any congestion pricing proposal by Cuomo's administration.

In May 2018, New York gubernatorial election candidate Cynthia Nixon proposed implementing both Cuomo's congestion pricing proposal and de Blasio's "millionaire tax", as well as a third proposal to levy fines on companies that pollute in the state. Nixon, a Democratic primary challenger to Cuomo, stated that all three proposals could be used to raise money for maintaining the city's subway system.

Many residents of Brooklyn and Queens opposed Cuomo's congestion pricing proposal because they would be forced to pay a toll to drive to Manhattan. These residents, in turn, had to drive because they lived too far from subway stations. Supporters included Uber, which was planning to begin a "six-figure" advertising campaign in support of congestion pricing in January 2018. The same month, the Tri-State Transportation Campaign released a report in support of congestion pricing. It found that in most New York State Assembly districts within the city, drivers tended to have higher incomes than mass-transit commuters, and that less than 10% of drivers from every district drove into the proposed congestion pricing area. However, Assemblyman Weprin said that this data was misleading since it did not take into account irregularly scheduled trips to Manhattan, such as for doctor's visits. New Jersey residents also criticized the plan, since there was a possibility that they could be charged twice. This was in response to speculation that the Holland Tunnel and Lincoln Tunnel tolls might be incorporated into the congestion pricing fee, because they entered Manhattan within the congestion pricing zone, while the toll of the George Washington Bridge would likely not be included since it was outside of the zone.

A writer for Slate Magazine lauded the proposed charge, saying that it was "miraculously and inexplicably free" to drive a private car around Manhattan, and comparing it to the several-thousand-dollar average monthly rents for real estate in the borough. Two Pew Research studies conducted in 2018 and 2019 showed that a majority of many demographic groups, in all geographic areas, endorsed congestion pricing. Additionally, in January 2019, a study by Siena College Research Institute found that up to 52% of New York state registered voters supported congestion pricing. Opposition to congestion pricing declined from 44% in January 2018 to 39% in January 2019.

=== Further planning and delays ===
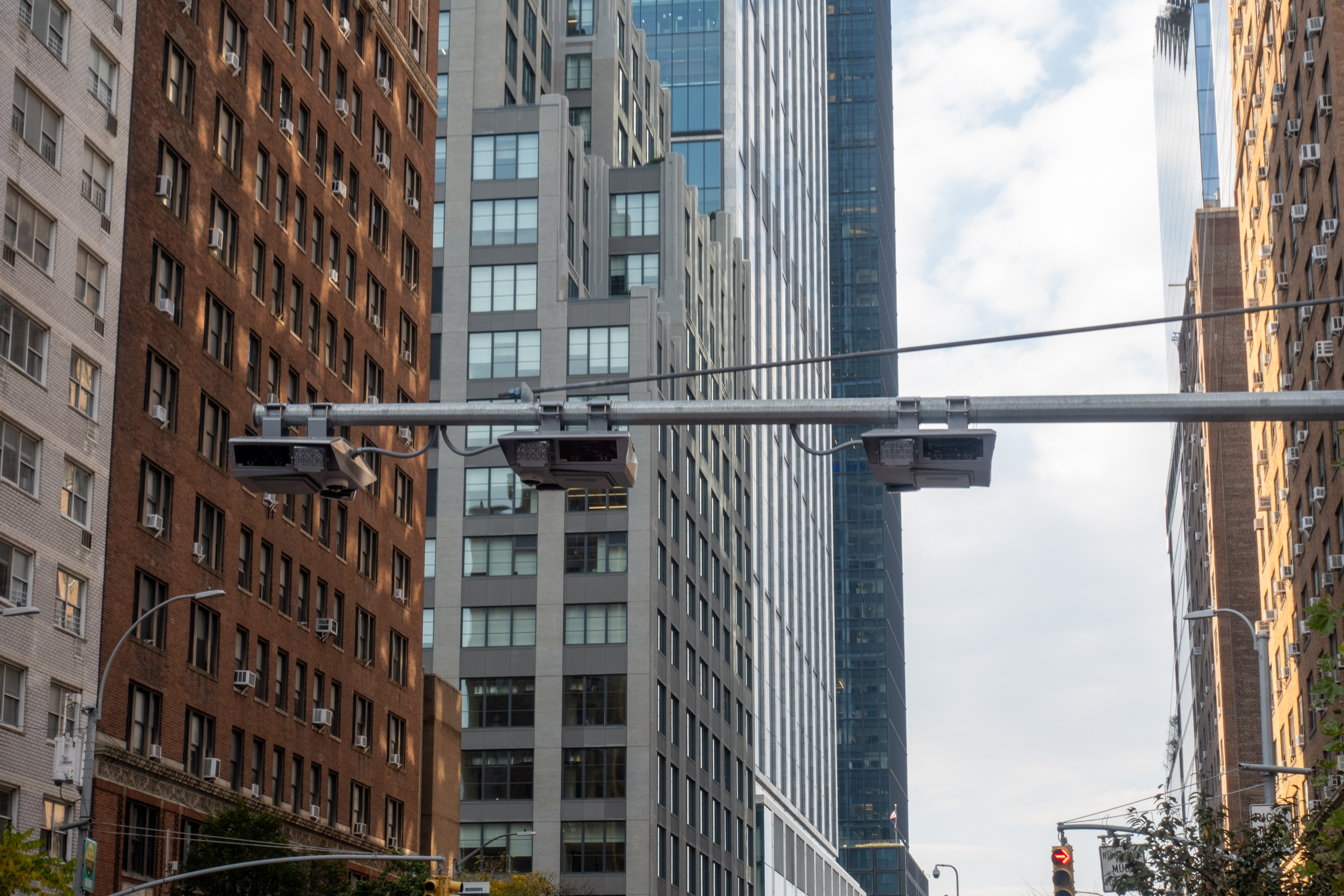
Congestion pricing cameras at 34th Street and Dyer Avenue

On October 18, 2019, the MTA announced that it would award the seven-year contract to design, build, operate, and maintain the tolling infrastructure for congestion pricing to TransCore for $507 million. In November 2019, a group of transit advocacy and good government organizations sent a letter to the MTA Board requesting that the Traffic Mobility Review Board (TMRB) be set up.

News outlets reported in February 2020 that the congestion fee could potentially be blocked by the federal government of the United States, due to disagreements between Cuomo and U.S. president Donald Trump. The congestion fee had to be approved by the Federal Highway Administration (FHWA) because some federal roads would be covered by the charge, and since federal law only allowed tolls to be installed on roads constructed with federal money if they are part of a value pricing program. That month, Politico reported that the MTA had not gotten an answer from the federal government on the type of environmental review process the tolling program would need to undergo. A full environmental impact statement (EIS) could take several years, while a shorter environmental assessment (EA) could be completed in less time. It reported that MTA Chairman and CEO Pat Foye and NYCDOT Commissioner Polly Trottenberg had met with Elaine Chao, the USDOT Secretary, to get an answer to this question in April 2019. While it was understood that the program would start in January 2021, the delay in determining the type of environmental review meant that it was unlikely to start then. The MTA was not allowed to do any work on the environmental review until a Notice of Intent was published in the Federal Register, and could not do any preparation for it since it would not know what it would be mandated to study.

In June 2019, the MTA had sent documents to the USDOT stating it believed it could complete an EA in three months, by March 2020, or an EIS in five months, by May 2020, if the federal government had made a decision by August 2019. These estimates were seen to be extremely optimistic. Politico found that while the shortest EAA ever done by a federal agency took 637 days, the average EIS done by the FHWA took 2,691 days, over seven years. The FHWA said it got all requested documentation from the MTA in January 2020 needed to make the determination for the type of environmental review.

The COVID-19 pandemic in New York City resulted in a decline in use of the New York City Subway between March and June 2020. Following the city's partial reopening in June, a mayoral panel projected that many people would choose to drive, for fear that taking mass transit would expose them to COVID-19, and studied congestion pricing as a solution to lessen road traffic. However, the federal government had still not acted. Janno Lieber, then the MTA's Chief Development Officer, said on July 13, 2020 that congestion pricing could be delayed until 2022 because it would take one year to install the required infrastructure even after federal approval. On July 14, 2020, Mayor de Blasio said that if Joe Biden were elected president in November, federal delays in determining the type of environmental review needed could go away.

By November 2020, the MTA reported that the continued delays could postpone the start of congestion pricing to 2023. Upon implementation, the revenue could be used to pay off pandemic-related deficits in the MTA's budget. The MTA had not yet set up the Traffic Mobility Review Board (TMRB), which was responsible for setting up toll rates and making decisions on potential exemptions and sending them to the MTA Board for approval. While the law that created congestion pricing required the TMRB to issue a report between November 15, 2020 and December 31, 2020, the law allowed the MTA to delay setting up the board until 30 days before the tolling program would be initiated.

=== Federal review ===
With the inauguration of Joe Biden as U.S. president in 2021, transit officials expressed optimism that the Biden administration would allocate funding to congestion pricing. Pete Buttigieg, the U.S. secretary of transportation, prioritized the congestion pricing plan that February. In March 2021, the federal government gave the MTA permission to conduct an environmental assessment (EA), ending months of stalling under the Trump administration. Eric Adams, who won the June 2021 New York City Democratic mayoral primary, also expressed his support for congestion pricing. As part of the federal government's approval of an environmental assessment, the MTA was obligated to discuss the plans with officials from Connecticut and New Jersey, as residents of these states would be affected by the plans. By mid-July, the MTA had only conducted one meeting with Connecticut officials and none with New Jersey officials.

MTA officials had publicly stated in mid-2021 that the agency was earning enough from state taxes to pay for its capital upgrades and that it did not immediately need congestion pricing funds for its 2020–2024 Capital Program. In response, de Blasio pressured the MTA to speed the implementation of congestion pricing, expressing his intention to have the surcharge in place by July 2022. In August 2021, New Jersey congressmen Josh Gottheimer and Jeff Van Drew proposed legislation in the U.S. House of Representatives which would prohibit the MTA from obtaining some federal grants unless an exemption to the congestion pricing plan was given to New Jersey drivers. The same month, the FHWA approved environmental assessment and public outreach for the congestion pricing plan, which was expected to take 16 months. Cuomo's resignation as governor that month also raised some uncertainty about the future of the congestion-pricing plan, as his successor Kathy Hochul had not committed to upholding congestion pricing. If the plan did receive federal approval, contractor TransCore was required to install toll equipment within 310 days.

The MTA held its first hearings on the congestion pricing plan on September 23, 2021, in which it announced draft toll rates. At the time, the peak toll was planned to range from $9 to $23, while for drivers with E-ZPass, off-peak and nighttime tolls would be lower. The MTA had promised exemptions to emergency vehicles and disabled-rider transport, and it was also proposing a tax credit for low-income residents in the congestion pricing zone. In March 2022, the federal government requested that the MTA answer 430 questions about the technical aspects of the congestion charge before the MTA submitted the plan for a final public review. Hochul said in June 2022 that the congestion pricing plan would not be implemented for at least another year. The delay in the implementation of congestion pricing also posed issues for other projects, including the second phase of the Second Avenue Subway, which would be partially funded by income from the congestion charge. Neither the MTA nor the federal government were willing to publicly disclose many aspects of the review process.

=== Final approval and opposition ===
==== 2022–2023: Public hearings and disputes ====
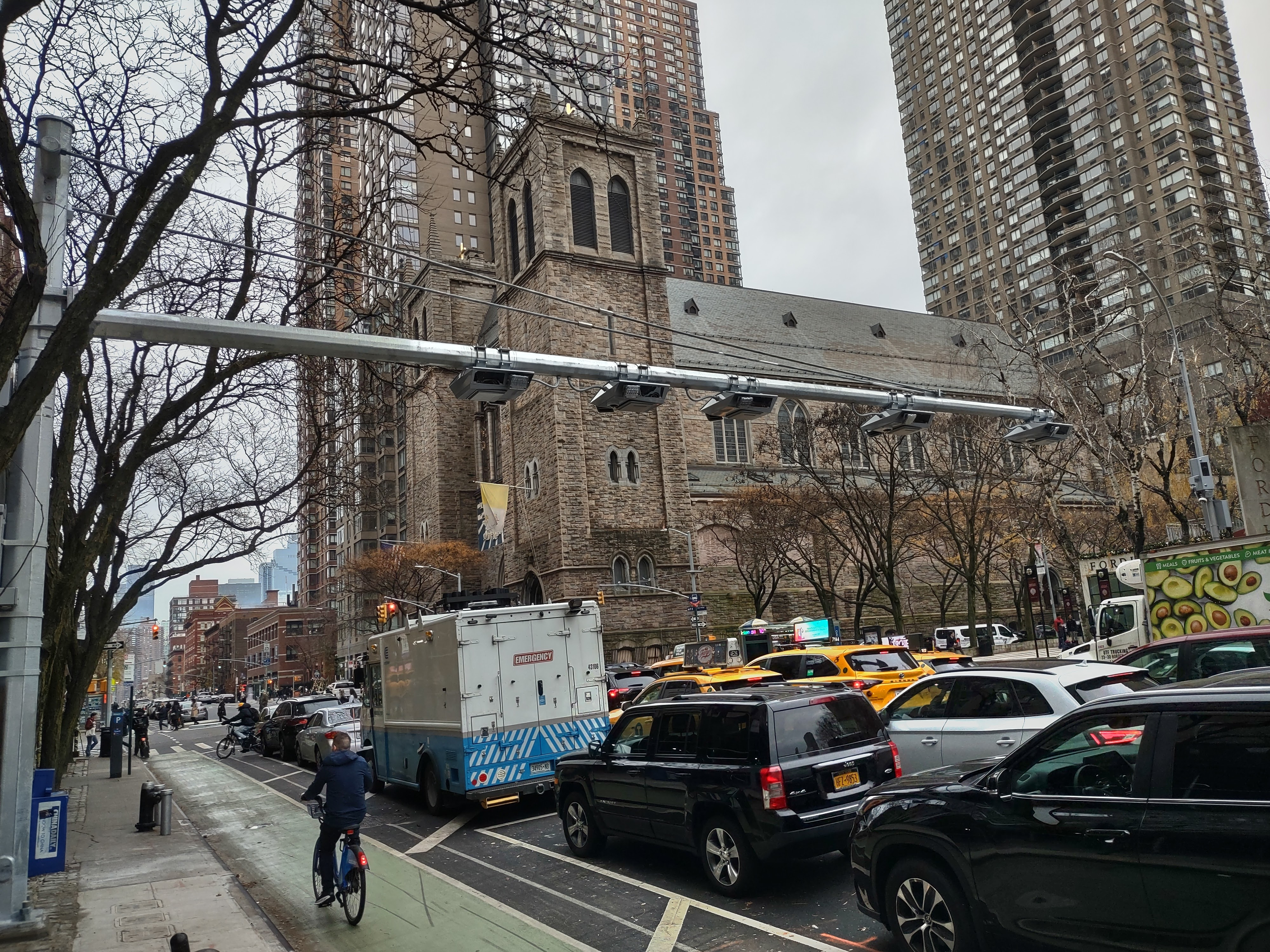
Congestion pricing gantry on Ninth Avenue at 60th Street, late 2023

Lee Zeldin, the Republican nominee in the 2022 New York gubernatorial election, expressed his opposition to the proposal. Public hearings on the proposal were held during the final week of August 2022; Gottheimer said that three-fourths of commenters were opposed to the plan. Later that year, New Jersey governor Phil Murphy requested that the federal government complete a full environmental impact study of the plan, and several New York City politicians petitioned Hochul to hold a statewide referendum on the congestion-pricing plan. Gottheimer and Mike Lawler introduced legislation in the U.S. House of Representatives in early 2023, which would ban the MTA from using federal funding for its capital projects unless drivers were exempted from all taxes related to the congestion charge. The MTA indicated in February 2023 that it had further postponed the implementation of congestion pricing to the second quarter of 2024.

On May 5, 2023, the Federal Highway Administration approved the release of the final EA and the draft Finding of No Significant Impact for the project, which occurred on May 11, 2023, triggering a 30-day public notice period. The draft EA noted that the plan would include a 50% reduction in tolls between 12 a.m. and 4 a.m. to encourage trucks to make deliveries at night, a once-a-day charge cap for for-hire vehicle and taxi drivers, and $207.5 million in environmental mitigation measures in neighborhoods that could see worse air quality with the tolls. These would include local park renovations, the planting of roadside vegetation along highways, upgraded infrastructure for electric truck charging, the replacement of diesel trucks in areas where truck traffic was expected to increase, an expansion in the city's school asthma case management program, the installation of air filtration units in schools near highways, expanding the NYC DOT's off-hours delivery program, and the retrofitting transport refrigeration trailers at the Hunts Point Produce Market to use cleaner vehicles instead of diesel. In addition, a 25% discount would be available to individuals making under $50,000 a year after their first ten trips each month during the first five years of the tolls. These new measures were in addition to the elimination of the $10 tag deposit fee for E-ZPass for drivers without a credit card backup and plans to electrify bus depots in Upper Manhattan and the Bronx.

The Federal Highway Administration gave its final approval on June 26, 2023, allowing the MTA to begin setting toll rates for the proposed congestion zone. The MTA issued a notice to TransCore to begin its installation of the tolling infrastructure; it had 310 days to do so under a contract. The plan was expected to be implemented around the start of May 2024. According to The New York Times, the congestion fees could be used to pay for new subway signals, additional elevators, new platform screen doors, updated turnstiles, and surveillance cameras. The MTA also planned to use revenue from the congestion charge to reduce pollution in the Bronx. Toll-gantry installation began in mid-July.

After the public notice period for congestion pricing began, New Jersey officials launched an advertising campaign to fight the plan. Opponents protested the plans that August, as the Traffic Mobility Board began considering whether to grant exemptions to certain groups of drivers. The New Jersey government sued the federal government in July 2023 to block the implementation of congestion pricing, with Staten Island officials as co-plaintiffs. The MTA joined the federal government as a co-defendant, while taxi drivers asked Hochul to exempt them from the congestion charge. Gottheimer said the charge would hurt small business owners in New York City. The MTA said the lawsuit placed numerous projects and 20,000 jobs at risk; a large portion of the MTA's 2020–2024 capital plan was to be financed by the toll. On October 6, 2023, a group of elected officials, in letter, said that the Port Authority had refused to allow gantries used to charge vehicles entering the congestion zone to be installed on its property at the Lincoln Tunnel, requiring the installation of 40 sensors on nearby local streets. The proposed toll rates were released in late November 2023, and the MTA board approved the toll rates early that December. Following the MTA board's vote, there was to be a 60-day public comment period for the plan.

==== Early 2024: MTA approval and further lawsuits ====
On February 14, 2024, the MTA halted the awarding of nearly all additional contracts due to ongoing litigation over congestion pricing. Later in the month, the MTA released a list of projects that would not be completed without the funds to be generated from the program. The MTA had planned to award $12 billion in contracts in 2024, but was only expecting to award $2.9 billion in contracts.

At the end of February 2024, the MTA announced that almost all of the 110 toll gantries had been installed, in advance of the planned implementation of congestion pricing in June 2024. In addition, the agency began hosting four public hearings prior to the MTA board's final vote on the plan. Amid public opposition to the plan, the MTA placed all of its new construction contracts on hold the same month. On February 13, 2024, Streetsblog reported that the Environmental Protection Agency had sent a letter in March 2023 indicating that its concerns about the program were addressed. The EPA had initially expressed concerns about the program's impacts on environmental justice communities and inadequate data on air quality impacts in New Jersey.

The MTA reported in March 2024 that, of more than 25,000 people who submitted comments on the plan over the preceding three months, there were nearly twice as many comments in favor of the plan as against it. Conversely, a poll of New York City residents found that close to two-thirds of respondents were against the congestion toll. The MTA board gave its final approval to the plan on March 27, 2024, making New York City the first locality in the United States to approve the creation of a congestion-pricing zone. At the end of the month, the MTA announced that the congestion charge would begin on June 30, 2024, and allowed people to begin requesting toll exemptions. On April 20, 2024, in anticipation of congestion pricing, legislation was passed as part of the state budget that added new fines for drivers who obscure their license plates to avoid paying tolls.

Meanwhile, further lawsuits were filed by Mark Sokolich, the mayor of Fort Lee, New Jersey; the United Federation of Teachers labor union and Staten Island borough president Vito Fossella; residents of Manhattan's Lower East Side neighborhood; the town of Hempstead, New York; and small business owners. The civil-rights organization NAACP joined one of the lawsuits as a plaintiff. Another lawsuit against the plan was filed by the government of Rockland County, New York, at the end of March. Although the congestion toll was intended to reduce vehicular emissions, three of the lawsuits claimed that the plan would violate an environmental rights amendment in the New York State Constitution. There were concerns that air pollution in the Bronx and Staten Island would increase, even as air pollution in the other three boroughs would decline. By May 2024, there were seven active lawsuits against the congestion pricing plan; an eighth lawsuit from truck drivers was filed that month. On June 20, federal judge Lewis J. Liman ruled against the plaintiffs in three of the lawsuits, saying that the environmental impact statement for the congestion toll had been thorough enough.

Several New York state lawmakers also proposed a bill in April 2024 to repeal the congestion toll, and congressmembers Nicole Malliotakis and Josh Gottheimer introduced a similar bill in the U.S. House of Representatives. By then, all toll gantries had been installed. To reduce opposition to the plan, the MTA announced that New Jersey would receive some of the congestion toll revenue. The NYCDOT also provided funding to encourage commercial vehicles in the congestion zone to make deliveries during off-peak hours, while the MTA announced that it would reduce fares for some commuter rail trips and increase service on some express bus routes. Officials in other cities such as Boston, Chicago, Washington D.C., and San Francisco also contemplated congestion tolls in conjunction with New York City's planned congestion charge.

== Postponement ==
=== Announcement ===
On June 5, 2024, Governor Hochul, in a major reversal, announced that the implementation of congestion pricing on June 30 would be indefinitely paused. She cited concerns that implementing the program would hurt the city's economic recovery. Hochul said that the State had set aside funds to address the gap in revenue from the program in preparation for the possibility that the program would be delayed due to lawsuits. Hochul also proposed increasing a payroll tax on New York City businesses to fund the MTA. The MTA had already spent $555.8 million on congestion pricing equipment and earmarked $15 billion of congestion-toll revenue for transit improvements across the five boroughs of New York City. With the Governor's announcement, attorneys for the MTA submitted court notifications in lawsuits against congestion pricing that, with the pause, they no longer expected congestion pricing to start by June 30.

The previous evening, Politico and The New York Times had reported that Hochul was considering delaying congestion pricing. Their reporting indicated that Hochul's decision was driven not by economic concerns, but out of concern that congestion pricing could hurt Democrats in competitive races for the House of Representatives in the New York suburbs and thus their efforts to take control of the House in November elections. Though the Democrats' efforts to regain House control ultimately proved unsuccessful, they did gain three Republican-controlled House seats in New York after congestion pricing was paused. Both Republican and Democratic political operatives saw the decision as a political panic move to take the controversial issue off the table. Curbed later reported that Hochul was very concerned about polling that indicated the program was very unpopular.

Reporting in Crain's New York indicated that Hochul had been worried about the political implications of the implementation of the program for several months and had been looking for cover to pause the program. She also reportedly voiced frustration for months that the plan was implemented by the administration of former Governor Andrew Cuomo, and that she never believed it was correctly structured. Curbed reported that Hochul was never fully on board with the program. Assembly Speaker Carl Heastie said that the Governor had let him know in the previous two weeks that she was getting concerned with the response of voters to congestion pricing. Internal discussions about pausing congestion pricing significantly picked up right after an unrelated visit to the White House earlier in the week. While at the White House, Hochul spoke with President Joe Biden and other officials about postponing the plan. In the days prior to her announcement, Hochul notified the White House, House minority leader Hakeem Jeffries, Mayor Eric Adams and other politicians of her decision, though state lawmakers and MTA Board members were not briefed beforehand about the decision.

=== Reactions ===
Hochul's decision was strongly condemned by environmentalists, transit advocates, and business groups that generally supported her, including the Partnership for New York City, and the New York Building Congress. Congestion pricing advocates said the lack of congestion-toll revenue would negatively affect the transit system, Those business groups were strongly opposed to the Governor's proposal to further increase the payroll tax in New York City. Even though Mayor Eric Adams said he would stay aligned with the Governor's position, multiple top-level appointees of his spoke out against Hochul's decision, including two appointees to the MTA Board, one of whom was a deputy mayor, and the head of the Department of City Planning. The Governor's appointees to the Board were irritated by the decision.

MTA Chairman and CEO Janno Lieber was informed of the Governor's decision shortly before the news publicly broke. The decision caught MTA leadership by surprise. Streetsblog reported that Lieber initially tried to convince lawmakers to support a stopgap solution to fund the MTA with the hope that congestion pricing could be saved in the 2025 legislative session, but, pulled back after realizing the extent of the backlash to the Governor's decision. He also reportedly threatened to resign over the delay at one point, though Lieber later denied this.

News outlets such as Politico and the New York Times initially reported that Hochul's decision would have to go to a vote of the MTA Board. Crain's and other news outlets like Politico suggested that the MTA Board could overrule the Governor's order since, according to the Public Authorities Reform Act of 2009, board members had an explicit fiduciary duty to the authority. News outlets questioned whether it was legal for Hochul to defer congestion pricing unilaterally. A lawyer from Columbia University said that the Governor's decision could be subject through a legal challenge under Article 78 of the state Civil Practice Law, which requires government officials to comply with their legal obligations under state law. That expert also noted that the decision could violate a provision in the 2020 Climate Leadership and Protection Act requiring state agencies to consider if their decisions are inconsistent with the state's requirement to reduce greenhouse gas emissions by 85% by 2050, and the Green Amendment made to the state's constitution in 2021.

After the postponement was announced, a poll of 1,400 Democratic Party voters (who were deemed most likely to support the congestion charge) found that 50% of voters approved of the delay and that 32% opposed it. Pluralities of poll respondents also thought the toll would negatively affect their commute, but they were more likely to support the toll after they learned that it would be used for specific projects. Congestion-pricing advocates also held rallies in support of the congestion charge.

=== Impact on capital program and federal approval ===
On the evening of June 7, the MTA made its first public statement since the Governor's initial announcement. The statement said that Hochul's decision put large sections of the 2020–2024 Capital Program at risk, and that the agency would deprioritize modernization and improvement projects, such as making stations ADA accessible, in favor of those necessary to maintain the basic operation of the system. The MTA Board would review the Capital Program to make necessary changes, and a revised capital program was expected to be presented at its June meeting. The MTA statement also said that, per federal law, congestion pricing required approval from the federal government, New York City, and New York State, and that the MTA could not unilaterally implement the program due to the lack of approval.

The final approval of the program required the state and city departments of transportation, along with the MTA, to sign the final approval of an agreement as part of the federal government's Value Pricing Pilot Program. On June 8, ABC reported that the federal government had not yet issued its final approval for the plan for the MTA, NYCDOT, and NYSDOT to sign. Streetsblog reported that officials at the MTA had expected that the approval of the final VPPP agreement would just be a formality after the FHWA reviewed the program's final environmental review. On June 10, MTA CEO Lieber, at a news conference, said the agency was working to scale back its capital program, and that the agency would not give up on congestion pricing. Lieber confirmed that the Governor directed the State DOT commissioner not to sign the final VPPP agreement. The USDOT withheld its approval of the MTA's final environmental review of congestion pricing and the final VPPP agreement. The FHWA approved the MTA's re-evaluation of the environmental assessment of congestion pricing on June 14.

Near the end of June, New York state controller Thomas DiNapoli warned that the MTA would need to defer $17 billion worth of capital projects or cut back service, and the MTA's board voted to postpone $16.5 billion worth of projects. Concurrently, the MTA board passed a resolution, highlighting the fact that the congestion charge was required to be implemented by law. The advocacy group Reinvent Albany reported that the congestion-pricing delay could result in the loss of at least 101,500 mostly high-paying jobs. There were also concerns that, due to the delayed repairs, the transit system could again experience critical failures. A September 2024 report by state controller DiNapoli found that the MTA's 2025–2029 capital program would have a severe shortfall, which called for over $65 billion in capital spending. DiNapoli also said the congestion-pricing pause had created a $640 million operating deficit through 2027. The New York Times also reported in late 2024 that the delays could cause emergency-response times to increase due to additional traffic congestion.

In response to the pause in congestion pricing, Moody's gave the MTA a credit negative watch on June 7, and analysts at S&P said that their rating on MTA revenue bonds could decrease. One report estimated that a complete cancellation of congestion pricing could cost the state up to $1 billion, while The Wall Street Journal reported that the delays had cost $700 million through the end of June 2024, including $33 million spent on hiring customer service staff.

=== Pro-congestion charge lawsuits ===
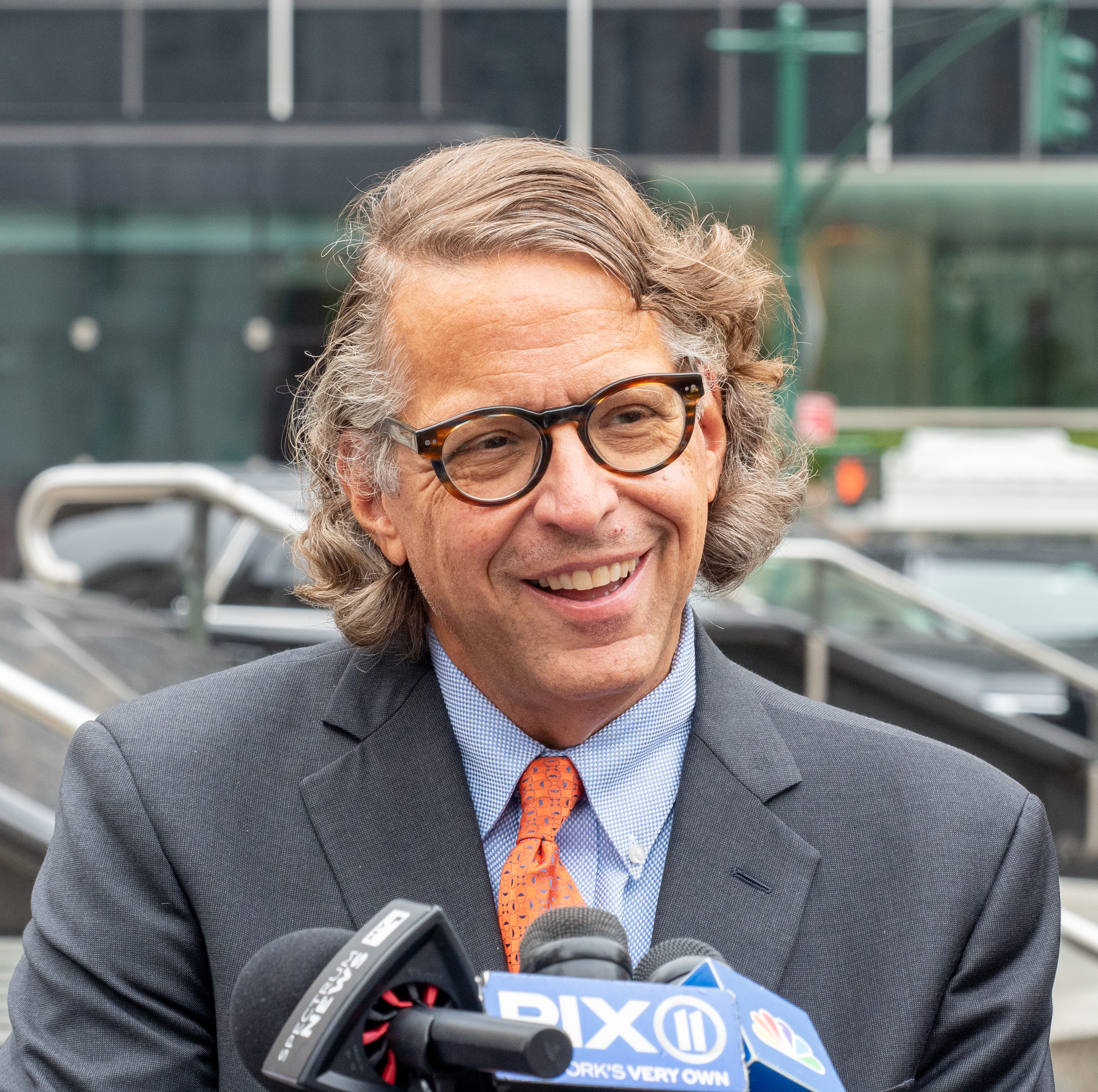
Andrew Celli, lawyer for the City Club of New York, speaking to the press outside the courthouse following a judge declining Hochul's request to dismiss

A coalition of legal experts, advocates, potential plaintiffs, and New York City Comptroller Brad Lander indicated plans to overturn Hochul's pause of congestion pricing. Lander said he would file a lawsuit in July if congestion pricing did not start. Transit advocates also threatened to sue the state government over the delays. Two lawsuits were filed: one by the City Club of New York, and another by the Riders Alliance, Sierra Club, and New York City Environmental Justice Alliance. Hochul said that the 2024 United States elections should determine whether the congestion charge should be implemented. In September 2024, New York Supreme Court judge Arthur Engoron dismissed the Hochul administration's request to dismiss these lawsuits.

=== Proposed replacement of revenue ===
To fill the gap of $1 billion a year that would have been raised by congestion pricing, the Governor proposed increasing the MTA payroll mobility tax on certain New York City businesses. Her proposal would have increased the tax on businesses with payroll expenses of more than $1.75 million a year from 0.6% of expenses to 0.825% of expenses. There also would have been a tax cut for smaller businesses. The State Legislature extended their session past Thursday as they considered the Governor's announcement and the proposed tax increase. This would have been the second increase in that tax in New York City in two years. While Assembly Democrats were considered to be willing to consider the Governor's proposed PMT increase if it was part of a larger deal, State Senate Democrats were more openly opposed to the proposed PMT increase. The Governor's team had offered to sign other bills she had initially been opposed to in exchange for the approval of Hochul's proposed tax. The proposal was deemed unviable by the late afternoon of June 6.

After the legislature rejected Hochul's tax plan, her team pivoted on the evening of June 6 to pushing the legislature to approve a resolution that would provide the MTA with an initial appropriation of $1 billion from the state's general fund, and put the full faith and credit of the state behind the bonds, which allow the MTA to sell $15 billion in bonds for its capital program. A recurring funding stream would be identified in the following legislative session in 2025. A vote had been planned for the plan that evening, but was pushed off after it became clear there was inadequate support for it in the legislature. By the following day, six Senate Democrats had already announced their opposition to the proposal, and 13 were reportedly opposed to it.

Hochul doubled down on her decision in a June 7 press conference and insisted that the pause would be temporary. She also stated that she did not believe a vote by the MTA Board on the pause was necessary since it would be temporary, and that MTA leadership agreed to implement it. Hochul said she made the decision when she did to catch legislators before the end of the session. She also stated that the funding was not essential since it would have taken months for the revenue to accumulate. The State Legislature adjourned their session on the morning of June 8 without passing legislation to provide alternative funding for the MTA. The Governor's last-minute announcement regarding congestion pricing had a major impact on the other priorities of the State Legislature, which had less time to discuss other legislation. Several of these bills, which were previously easily expected to pass both houses, were no longer expected to be passed.

=== Revival of congestion toll ===
State legislators began informally negotiating with Hochul to implement a reduced congestion toll in late June 2024. Legislators wanted the tolls to be implemented before the end of the year, since Donald Trump had promised to cancel congestion pricing if he won the 2024 United States presidential election. If he was elected, Trump could cancel the congestion toll by revoking final approval, requesting another environmental study, or siding with the plaintiffs in the lawsuits against the program. The Permanent Citizens Advisory Committee to the MTA reported in August 2024 that, of eight alternatives to the congestion pricing plan, none provided as much funding as the congestion toll would have. The same month, Politico reported that state lawmakers were considering lowering the tolls and giving exemptions to emergency workers. According to Stanford University researcher Michael Bannon, a reduction in the toll could trigger another environmental analysis that could take years to complete.

By October, Hochul was considering unpausing the congestion charge. After Trump won the 2024 election the next month, congestion-pricing advocates requested that Hochul unpause the congestion toll; the Gothamist reported that it would be harder for Trump to cancel the congestion toll if it was already in place when he took office. A week after the election, on November 14, Hochul proposed implementing reduced tolls of $9 during the daytime and $2.50 at night (60% of the initially approved rate), charged once a day. Under Hochul's proposal, the base toll could be raised to $12 by 2028 (80% of the previously approved rate), then to the full $15 by 2031. The $9 toll would raise $500 million a year, increasing to $700 million a year if it were raised to $12. The full $15 billion for the capital program would likely be raised by borrowing those funds over a longer period. Hochul decided to lower tolls to $9 since it would forgo the need for further environmental review. A second briefer reevaluation was done to ensure that the environmental impacts of the new rates are similar to what was found in the EA. It was also announced that the reduced toll would be implemented on January 5, 2025.

Cars cross 60th St and into the congestion relief zone shortly after midnight on January 5, 2025, when the toll went into effect.

The MTA voted in favor of implementing the toll on November 18, 2024, and the Biden administration approved it three days later after releasing the reevaluation. Republican politicians such as Mike Lawler, Nicole Malliotakis, and Bruce Blakeman quickly promised to prevent the tolls from taking effect, while progressive Democrats expressed their doubts about the effectiveness of the reduced tolls. Opponents of the toll also indicated that they would try to defeat Hochul in the 2026 New York gubernatorial election. There were also concerns that the congestion toll would exacerbate parking shortages in Upper Manhattan and that the toll would increase the cost of goods in New York City.

=== Remaining lawsuits ===
In November 2024, there were still at least eight ongoing anti-congestion pricing lawsuits at the time; by mid-December, there were ten such lawsuits.

The Town of Hempstead sued New York State on November 21 in Nassau County Supreme Court, arguing that the MTA violated the state's Administrative Procedure Act by not providing the legally required 45-day public comment period and by not filing the plan in the state register. The town sought a temporary restraining order. The town had also filed a case against the tolls in federal court in May. On December 23, Nassau Supreme Court Judge Lisa Cairo asked the MTA and the Governor to appear in court for defense arguments on January 16, 2025, after the toll was scheduled to start.

On December 18, Governor Hochul said she had offered New Jersey multiple "generous" settlement offers if it dropped its lawsuit against the program. She did not believe New Jersey was negotiating in good faith, and Governor Murphy of New Jersey refused her offers. New York offered extending the toll credit for drivers using the Holland and Lincoln Tunnels to drivers traveling over the George Washington Bridge, over $100 million in toll revenue to NJ Transit, and additional funds for environmental mitigation measures in Essex and Bergen Counties. This offer was worth over $100 million. Murphy reportedly only would agree to a settlement that offered a credit equal to the price of the toll. Other reporting from Gothamist and Politico indicated that the offer included $30 million for environmental mitigation measures, an extension of the crossings credit to the George Washington Bridge, an agreement to cover half of the $1 billion remaining unfunded cost of the new Port Authority Bus Terminal and to prioritize improvements to the NJ Transit portions of the Penn Station Reconstruction project, and $1 million for a planning study for the Bergen Loop, which would enable one-seat rides to Penn Station from lines that required transfers at Secaucus Junction. That reporting indicated New Jersey wanted a higher amount for mitigation projects and a higher crossing credit. New Jersey was also under the impression that New York already would have split the remaining cost of the bus terminal project, as was usually done for Port Authority projects. Judge Leo Gordon, who was overseeing the case had not ruled yet as he sought the two sides to reach a settlement.

On December 23, Manhattan federal judge Louis Liman ruled that the congestion toll could go into effect while four lawsuits against it proceeded, saying that the plaintiffs in the case were unlikely to win. The same day, federal judge Cathy Seibel also denied a request by Orange County and Rockland County for a preliminary injunction to block the plan, meaning the New Jersey case was the last major obstacle to the plan's implementation.

On December 30, 2024, federal judge Leo Gordon from the U.S. District Court in New Jersey ruled largely in favor of the MTA and the FHWA in New Jersey and Fort Lee's case against congestion pricing, which was considered to be the most serious challenge to the implementation of the program. NJ had argued in April that the FHWA did not comprehensively study the environmental impacts of the plan, and wanted the agency to complete a more thorough Environmental Impact Statement, instead of the Environmental Assessment that had been done. Gordon remanded the decision to the FHWA so it could more details on why the plan provided detailed pollution mitigation measures for the Bronx but not for New Jersey communities expected to also see increases in car traffic. He also reserved judgement on the overall toll structure, and said he was not yet willing to sustain the FHWA's decision-making on considering alternative tolling plans due to the November decision to phase-in the $15 toll. The FHWA was required to provide an explanation and make any other actions by January 17, with responses from New Jersey required by February 11. Gordon's decision did not include an injunction that would prevent the program from being implemented. While Governor Hochul and chairman and CEO Lieber said the ruling meant that congestion pricing could start on January 5 as planned, Randy Mastro, the lawyer for New Jersey, argued that Gordon's ruling blocked the plan. The following day, New Jersey requested clarification on the ruling, and a temporary injunction or restraining order to prevent the tolls from starting while the decision was on remand to the FHWA.

On January 3, 2025, Judge Gordon denied an emergency request from New Jersey government to halt the tolls, though he also ruled that the federal government had to provide additional information on the toll's environmental impacts. Following the decision, New Jersey appealed the ruling to the Third Circuit U.S. Court of Appeals. On January 4, that court denied New Jersey's request for a restraining order against the plan without any "view on the merits" of the case. In April 2025, Liman dismissed claims by several plaintiffs who had sued to stop the toll. The town of Hempstead's lawsuit was dismissed that June. In another lawsuit filed by the Orange and Rockland county governments, in June 2026, the United States Court of Appeals for the Second Circuit dismissed the counties' claims that the toll restricted people's right to drive in Manhattan.

== Implementation ==
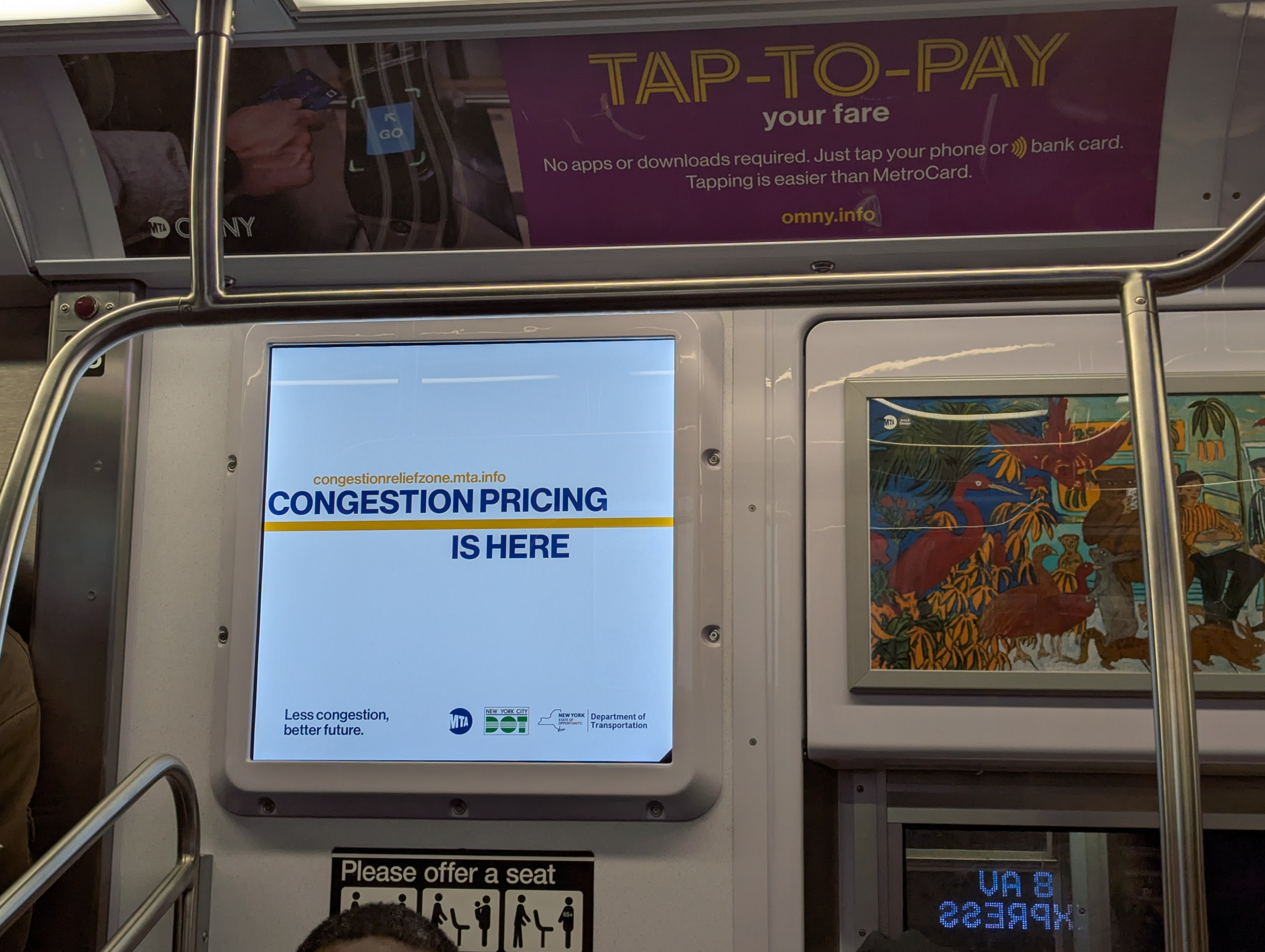
A public service announcement for congestion pricing on the subway in January 2025

The toll went into effect as scheduled at midnight on January 5, 2025. The program was set to start on a Sunday when traffic was lower, allowing unexpected issues to be resolved more easily. Late fees were not collected for the first 60 days. In addition, during January, Lyft rideshare passengers received a $1.50 credit (equivalent to the toll surcharge) for any trip that traveled through the zone that could then be used on future rideshare trips or with the city's Citi Bike system that the company also operates.

The Jewish Press reported that congestion pricing was costing Hatzalah $250 a day since the MTA's language for its exemption for authorized emergency vehicles required them to be company-owned, which was not the case for Hatzalah, whose vehicles were personally owned. The NYPD seized several cars that used fake or obscured license plates to bypass the toll. The fee caused issues for patrons of garages within the congestion zone. On January 8, after a person making an Uber trip to a specific building on 61st Street was incorrectly charged a congestion fee, the MTA revised the congestion zone's boundaries. Other issues reported by motoriests included residents being tolled for leaving garages within the congestion zone (since the sensors erroneously classified their cars as having entered the zone when they were already inside), and motorists being charged multiple times in one day.

=== Effects ===
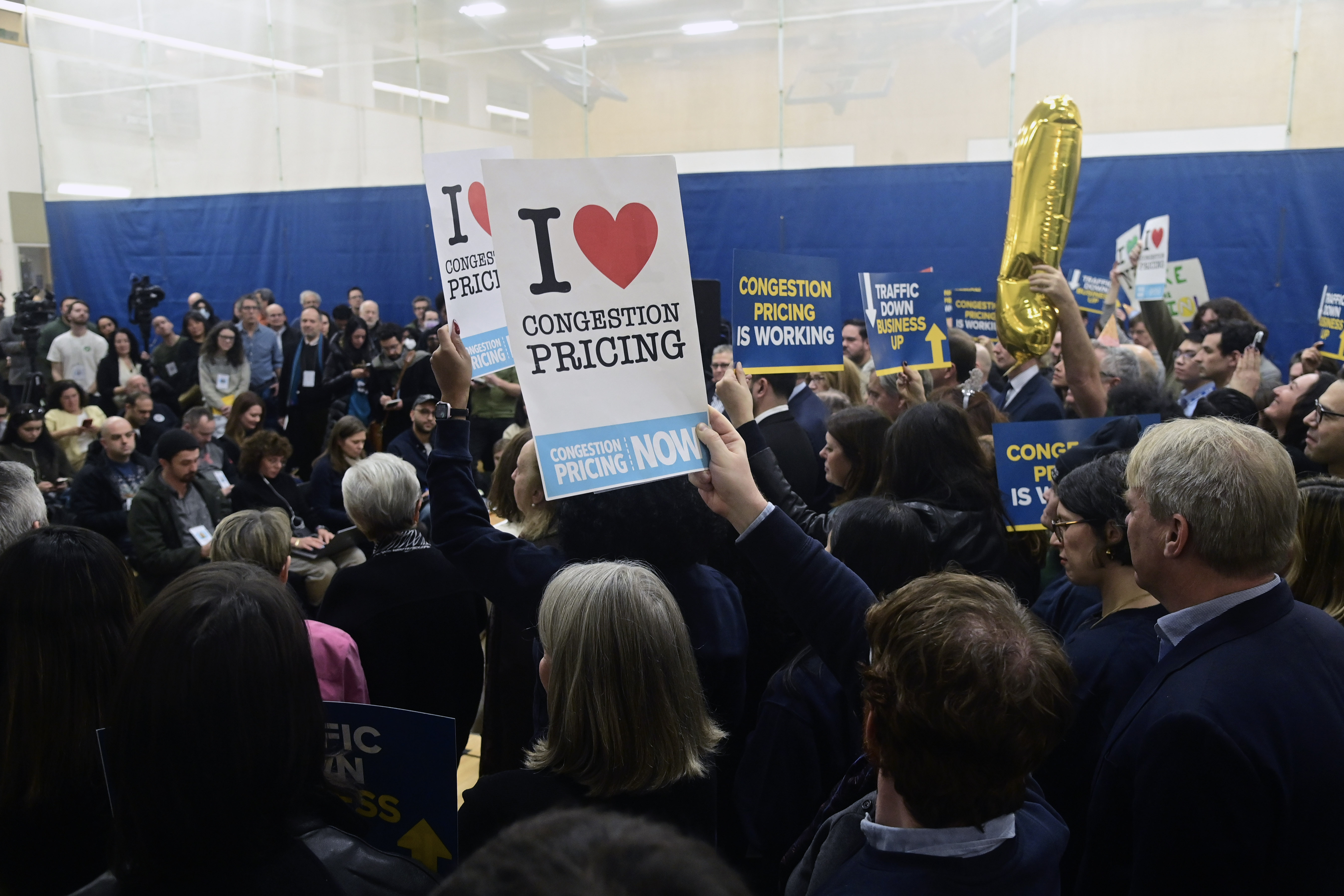
A rally in celebration of the first year of congestion pricing, attended by Governor Hochul, Mayor Zohran Mamdani, and MTA CEO Lieber.

Multiple analyses found that vehicular traffic, car-collision injuries, parking violations, and noise complaints had all decreased, while MTA transit ridership, yellow-taxi trips, business activity, and visitor counts within the toll zone had all increased.

==== Private vehicle traffic ====
During the first week of the congestion pricing program, traffic decreased by 7.5% compared with the same week in 2024, and congestion on several major streets decreased. Initial data showed "significantly lower volumes" of traffic in Manhattan's central business district, with daily vehicle entries dropping to between 475,000 and 560,000 vehicles from a baseline of 583,000. Travel times improved substantially, particularly for river crossings, with 30–40% reductions in travel time between Manhattan and New Jersey; cars traveling crosstown experienced 20–30% faster trips, while north-south avenue travel times improved by up to 20%. Trends continued in the following months. In March 2025, the MTA reported a 13% decrease in the number of vehicles entering the congestion zone compared with March 2024. By July 2025, there were 67,000 fewer daily vehicles in the congestion zone compared to before implementation. The same month, one study found that travel times within the congestion zone had decreased, and that delivery companies were opting to use smaller vehicles (which were charged lower tolls) in the toll zone. In the first 11 months of the toll's implementation, vehicle counts in the toll zone decreased 11%, and during the first year, there were an estimated 27 million fewer vehicular entries into the zone compared with previous years.

The toll's implementation led to parking shortages in Upper Manhattan and at Long Island Rail Road stops outside the zone. An RPA report from June 2025 found that congestion in northern New Jersey had decreased by up to 14% due to the congestion toll, and other studies found decreased congestion throughout the New York metropolitan area. In the first two weeks, afternoon travel times on major highways in the Bronx, outside of the congestion zone, increased 9%; MTA data later showed slight decreases in average vehicle volumes on the Cross Bronx Expressway following implementation of the toll. A DOT report in July 2026 found that the toll generally did not prompt an increase of drivers parking just outside the congestion zone's boundaries.

==== Mass transit and pedestrian traffic ====
After the toll was implemented, bus service saw improvements in travel times. Taxi trips within the congestion zone increased as well, and taxis also saw improved travel times. Express buses from Staten Island also recorded increased average speeds; the SIM24 bus from Staten Island saw a 5.3% decrease in travel time, saving nearly four minutes primarily due to faster tunnel crossings. The MTA reported in late January that travel times into the congestion zone had halved in some locations, while bus and subway ridership had increased slightly compared to 2024. A May 2025 analysis found ridership increases of between 4.4% and 13% on transit modes operated by the MTA, and another analysis found that subway ridership increased 7.7% from 2024 to 2025, representing an increase of over 90 million rides.

Pedestrian traffic within the congestion zone increased in the month after the toll was implemented. During the first 11 months, pedestrian traffic in the toll zone increased 3.4%, more than double the 1.4% increase seen in Manhattan overall. In the first half of 2025, traffic-related fatalities in the congestion zone dropped to 87 from the 128 during the same period in 2024.

==== Economic effects ====
Broadway theatre ticket sales increased after the toll was implemented. Most restaurant owners in the toll zone reported that their business remained unchanged, while others said that their vendors had raised prices or that patronage had decreased. Between the third quarters of 2023 and 2025, the rate of vacant storefronts in the toll zone declined more substantially than overall vacancy rates in Manhattan or citywide, although vacancy rates in the toll zone remained high compared to the rest of the borough and city. Sales tax revenue in the city also increased 6.3% from 2024 to 2025.

==== Air quality ====
In July 2025, New York City's Health Department released preliminary data of fine particle air pollution levels collected at various locations inside and outside of the congestion relief zone (including the Staten Island Expressway, the Cross Bronx Expressway, the Alexander Hamilton Bridge, and Mott Haven) from October 2024 through March 2025. The data showed steady or decreasing levels of air pollution at most locations after implementation of the congestion charge. An update including data through spring 2025 found that, although concentrations did decrease in the congestion relief zone, the decrease was not statistically significant.

Using crowd-sourced vehicle count and speed data in the toll zone and an EPA emissions model, a 2026 Nature study estimated that eight weeks after the implementation of the congestion pricing, vehicular emissions had declined by 16-22%, driven by a 10-14% reduction in vehicle trips and a 12% increase in traffic speed. A regression analysis published in December 2025 estimated that, in the first six months after the toll's implementation, peak hour fine particle air pollution in the toll zone decreased by 22% and that all five boroughs of the city and the larger New York metropolitan area saw reductions in peak hour air pollution (although to lower degrees). By contrast, preliminary analyses based on daily, rather than peak hour, concentrations showed little or no air quality improvement, even in the toll zone.

A preliminary study in mid-2026 estimated that average hourly fine particle concentration measured at monitors in the South Bronx increased by about 2% in the year after implementation. A more reliable study, published by the city's health department in August 2026, found that pollution levels had held steady or improved slightly at all locations in New York City. In environmental justice neighborhoods in particular, including the South Bronx, congestion pricing did not increase pollution levels.

==== Revenue and projects funded ====
A report from early March 2025, published by the Regional Plan Association (RPA), found that the reduction of travel times into the congestion zone would save between $500 million and $1.3 billion per year. The MTA collected $48 million in toll revenue during the program's first month and $52 million during the second month; in the first four months of 2025, the charge raised $215 million in total. In June 2025, revenue from the congestion toll was used to increase service on more than a dozen bus lines citywide. The program was projected to provide $500 million in revenue in its first year. It had earned the MTA $365 million by August 2025 and an estimated $548.3 million by December.

In October 2025, the MTA sold $230 million worth of bonds to help fund the first projects that were being partially financed using congestion-toll revenue. These projects were approved that December. In September 2026, the city government began using congestion-toll revenue to encourage delivery truck operators to make deliveries in the toll zone during overnight hours.

=== Reactions ===
A confidential memo, mistakenly released by the United States Attorney's Office for the Southern District of New York, detailing flaws in the federal government's legal arguments.

The New York City Fire Department's emergency responders' union advised its members who worked in the congestion zone to transfer elsewhere. Jersey City mayor Steven Fulop proposed levying a "reverse congestion pricing" toll on vehicles entering Jersey City from New York. Curtis Sliwa, who unsuccessfully ran in the 2025 New York City mayoral election, proposed a tax rebate for residents who drive into the congestion zone.

==== Public sentiment ====
Opposition to the toll decreased following its implementation. A poll from February 2025 found that six-tenths of New York state residents opposed federal efforts to repeal the toll, despite only 27% supporting the toll itself. A March poll found that New York City residents supported congestion pricing 42–35% (despite a lower favorability rate statewide), while another poll from April found that 42% of city residents supported the program. The toll's most vocal opposition had abated by the first anniversary of its implementation.

==== Revocation of federal approval ====
After Trump's inauguration on January 20, 2025, Murphy asked Trump to reconsider the federal government's approval of the congestion toll. Trump considered rescinding federal approval after his inauguration, and he and Hochul discussed the tolling program the next month. U.S. Transportation Secretary Sean Duffy formally revoked federal approval February 19, 2025, and the federal government ordered the MTA to stop collecting tolls by March 21. Though opponents of the toll praised the rescission of federal approval, the MTA immediately sued the federal government over the move's legality; the tolls remained in effect pending a judicial ruling. The MTA said that, if congestion pricing were terminated, much of its 2025–2029 capital plan would be unfunded. State officials began negotiating with the federal government to keep the congestion toll, and Lieber indicated his intention to charge tolls after the deadline.

Federal officials gave New York state officials a 30-day extension to April 20, then another extension to May 21, threatening to withhold Federal Highway Administration funding from New York City. Amid reports of a tentative agreement to retain the toll through at least October, a federal Twitter account described news stories about the agreement as fabricated. After lawyers working at the United States Attorney's Office for the Southern District of New York mistakenly released a confidential memo detailing legal flaws in the government's arguments, the USDOT replaced the lawyers, questioning their competence and motives. The state continued to charge tolls after the third deadline had passed, and in May 2025, Liman issued an injunction temporarily preventing the suspension of federal funds. No further action occurred until December, when Liman scheduled oral arguments for the following month. On March 3, 2026, Liman ruled that the USDOT's effort to cancel the congestion tolls was illegal and that Duffy did not have the authority to revoke federal approval of congestion pricing. In response, USDOT officials and the Justice Department met to contemplate their responses, including whether to appeal.

== See also ==
- New York energy law – Laws of the US state of New York
- Road pricing – Methods of generating revenue from road users
- Road space rationing – Travel demand management strategy
