= Soumodip Sarkar =

Economist and Management Scholar

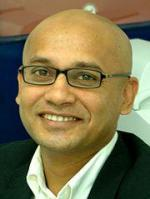
Soumodip Sarkar

Soumodip Sarkar (Jamshedpur, 13 June 1965) is an economist and management scholar.

== Education and academic positions ==
Soumodip Sarkar studied economics at the University of Calcutta, graduating in 1988, receiving his MSc and PhD in economics from Boston's Northeastern University in 1991 and 1995, respectively. He previously worked at the Harvard Institute for International Development (HIID) and later at the John F. Kennedy School of Government, (Harvard University).

Former Vice-Rector for Innovation, Cooperation & Entrepreneurship at the University of Évora, Mr. Sarkar is a Full Professor at the Department of Management in the mentioned university. In addition, Soumodip Sarkar is a researcher at the Center of Advanced Studies in Management and Economics (CEFAGE) University of Évora – CEFAGE, where he is also the coordinator of the Program in Entrepreneurship and Innovation.

A Fellow of the Asia Center at Harvard University since 2018, Professor Sarkar was also the first Dean of the pioneering Doctoral School in Portugal, from 2010 to 2014.

Soumodip Sarkar is the President of the Accreditation body of the Portuguese University Evaluation Commission (A3ES), in the area of Management, being also the scientific coordinator of Portugal's Global Entrepreneurship Report (GEM) and, internationally, part of the CEEMAN accreditation team. He was also the Panel Chair of the (social science stream 2) of the Lithuanian Science Council, for the Evaluation Period 2018-2022 (Conducted in 2023).

== Life and work ==
Research interests include strategy and innovation (especially related to digital transformation, and the rise of China), entrepreneurship and sustainability., with the research being published in journals such as the Strategic Management Journal; Journal of Operations Management; Journal of Business Venturing; Academy of Management, among others. He is featured in the Stanford’s “World’s Top 2% Scientists list” for the last two years (rankings of 2022 and 2023).

Professor Sarkar has given international speeches on strategy, innovation, and entrepreneurship and has frequent presences in national and international media.

Among the extended list of publications, Mr. Sarkar wrote four books on entrepreneurship and innovation, including EntreSutra.

Professor Sarkar is also the Executive President of the Science Park of Alentejo region (PACT), a project that aims to position the Portuguese region of Alentejo as a global reference innovation center. In honour of his impact and contribution to society, a space in the technology park in Évora, has been named after him.

== Selected publications ==
=== Books and book chapters ===
- Sarkar, S., Calisto, M. L., Costa, T. (Editors). Innovation Ecosystems in Tourism - From Corporate to Supranational Level. De Gruyter. (Forthcoming 2022).
- Sarkar, S. (2019). EntreSutra, Bloomsbury Publishers.
- Sarkar, S. (2013). Empreendedorismo e Inovação, Lisboa: Escolar Editora (ISBN 978-972-592-269-9) Third edition, 2nd Reprint.
- Sarkar, S., Ramalho, P. (2013). Academic Entrepreneurship: A descriptive analysis of University Spin-offs in Portugal in Redford D. (ed), Handbook Of Research On Portuguese Entrepreneurship Education And University Start Up Support, CUP, 2013.
- Sarkar, S. (2009). "Outsourcing - A story of metamorphosis", in H. Marques, E. Soukiazis, P. Cerqueira (eds.), Integration and Globalization: Challenges for Developed and Developing Countries Edward Elgar (ISBN 978-1-84844-655-7).
- Sarkar, S. (2008). O Empreendedor Inovador – Faça Diferente e Conquiste seu Espaço no Mercado, Rio de Janeiro: Elsevier-Campus Editora (ISBN 978-85-352-3085-7).
- Sarkar, S. (2007). Innovation, Market Archetypes and Outcome – An Integrated Framework, Heidelberg: Springer-Verlag (ISBN 978-3-7908-1945-8).
- Sarkar, S. (2007). Empreendedorismo e Inovação, Lisboa: Escolar Editora, (ISBN 978-972-592-209-5).
- Sarkar, S., Carvalho, L. (2006). "Inovação nos serviços: novos desafios exigem novas abordagens", in M. Branco, L.S. Carvalho, C. Rego (eds.), Economia com Compromisso: Ensaios em Memória de José Dias Sena, Évora: Universidade de Évora 215-226 (ISBN 972-778-092-X).
- Sarkar, S. (2005). “Sourcing Decisions on International Business: A Holistic Model” in T. Theurl, E.C. Meyer (eds.) Strategies for Cooperation, Aachen: Shaker-Verlag, pp. 183–198 (ISBN 3-8322-4446-8).
- Sarkar, S. (2004). "Non-tariff measures in services measuring gains from movement of skilled personnel in quantifying non-tariff barriers to trade", in P. Dee, M. Ferrantino (eds.), Quantitative Methods for Assessing the Effects of Non-tariff Measures and Trade Facilitation, Singapore: USITC, 107-120 (ISBN 981-256-051-3).

=== Articles ===
- Sarkar, S., Waldman-Brown, A., Clegg, S. (2022). “A Digital Ecosystem as an Institutional Field: Curated Peer Production as a response to Institutional Voids revealed by COVID-19” R&D Management [ABS3] (Forthcoming).
- Kedas, S., Sarkar, S. (2022). “Putting your money where your mouth is – The role of rewards in a value-based understanding of restaurant crowdfunding”. International Journal of Contemporary Hospitality Management [ABS3]
- Sarkar, S., Mateus S. (2022). “COVID-19 and rapid response in healthcare: Enacting bricolage to overcome resource constraints”. Technology in Society (Forthcoming) [ABS2].
- Sarkar, S., Mateus S. (2022). “Doing more with less - How frugal innovations can contribute to improving healthcare systems”. Social Science & Medicine (Forthcoming) [ABS4]
- Sarkar, S., Kedas, S. (2022). “Globally Distributed Talent Communities: A Typology of Innovation Problems and Talent Characteristics”. Thunderbird International Business Review [ABS2] doi:10.1002/tie.22272
- Sarkar, S., Mateus S. (2022). “Value creation using minimal resources - A meta-synthesis of frugal innovation”. Technological Forecasting and Social Change, (Forthcoming) [ABS3]
- Candeias, J., Sarkar, S. (2022). “Entrepreneurial Ecosystems and distinguishing features of effective policies - an evidence-based approach”. Entrepreneurship and Regional Development. [ABS3] doi:10.1080/08985626.2022.2045634
- Roy R., Sarkar, S. (2022). “Boundary conditions of the mutual forbearance hypothesis: Impact of technology evolution on multimarket competition”. Managerial and Decision Economics [forthcoming] [ABS2] doi:10.1002/mde.3543
- Osiyevskyy, O., Sinha, K., Sarkar, S., Dewald, J. (2021). “Thriving on adversity: EntrEntrepreneurial thinking in times of crisis". Journal of Business Strategy [ABS1]
- Sarkar, S., Bilau, J., Correia, M. (2021). “Financing creation of micro enterprises with microcredit: Does being an immigrant make a difference?” Strategic Change [ABS2]
- Roy, R., Sarkar, S. (2021). “Potential lead user and star scientist (im)mobility in the pre-commercialization phase of a new technology”. IEEE- Technology Engineering Management Journal doi:10.1109/TEM.2021.3101148 [ABS3]
- Radnejad, A. B., Sarkar, S., Osiyevskyy, O. (2021). Design thinking in responding to disruptive innovation: A case study. The International Journal of Entrepreneurship and Innovation doi:10.1177/14657503211033940 [ABS2]
- Hossein, M., Sarkar, S. (2021). "Frugal Entrepreneurship: Profiting with Inclusive Growth". IEEE- Technology Engineering Management Journal doi:10.1109/TEM.2021.3088589 [ABS3]
- Srinivasan R., Choo, A., Narayanan S., Sarkar. S., Tenhiala, A. (2021). "Knowledge sources, innovation objectives and their impact on innovation performance: Quasi-Replication of Leiponen and Helfat (2010)". Strategic Management Journal doi:10.1002/smj.3287 [ABS4*]
- Choo, A., Narayanan, S., Srinivasan, S., Sarkar, S. (2021). "Introducing Goods Innovation, Service Innovation, or Both? Investigating the tension in managing innovation revenue streams for manufacturing and service firms". Journal of Operations Management doi:10.1002/joom.1136 [ABS4*]
- Sarkar, S., Clark, S. (2021). “Resilience in a time of contagion: Lessons from small businesses during the Corona virus pandemic”. Journal of Change Management doi:10.1080/14697017.2021.1917495 [ABS1]
- Sarkar, S. (2021). “Breaking the Chain: Governmental Frugal Innovation in Kerala to combat the COVID-19 Pandemic”. Government Information Quarterly, 38(1), 101549 doi:10.1016/j.giq.2020.101549 [ABS3]
- Sarkar, S., Bilau, S. J., Basílio, M. (2020). “Do anchor infrastructures matter for regional Smart Specialization Strategy? The case of Alentejo”. Regional Studies doi:10.1080/00343404.2020.1722804 [ABS4]
- Sarkar, S., Osiyevskyy, O., Hayes, L. (2019). “Talking your way into entrepreneurial support: an analysis of satisfaction drivers in entrepreneur mutual aid groups”. Journal of Small Business Management doi:10.1111/jsbm.12384 [ABS3]
- Hernández-Linares, R., López-Fernández, C., Sarkar, S., Kellermanns, F. (2019). “The Effect of Socioemotional Wealth on the Relationship between Entrepreneurial Orientation and Family Business Performance”. BRQ Business Research Quarterly doi:10.1016/j.brq.2019.03.002 [ABS2]
- Hernández-Linares, R., Sarkar, S., Cobo, M. J. (2018). "Inspecting an Achilles heel: A quantitative analysis of fifty years of attempts to define family business". Scientometrics doi:10.1007/s11192-018-2702-1 [ABS2]
- Sarkar, S., Rufin, C., Haughton, J. (2018). “Inequality and Entrepreneurial Thresholds?” Necessity, Opportunity and Access to Resources”. Journal of Business Venturing doi:10.1016/j.jbusvent.2017.12.009 [ABS4]
- Sarkar, S. (2018). “Grassroots entrepreneurs and social change at the bottom of the pyramid: the role of bricolage”. Entrepreneurship & Regional Development doi:10.1080/08985626.2017.1413773 [ABS3]
- Sarkar, S., Osiyevskyy, O., Clark, S. (2017). “Incumbent capability enhancement in response to radical innovations”. European Management Journal doi:10.1016/j.emj.2017.05.006 [ABS2]
- Mason, C., Bilau, S. J., Botelho, T., Sarkar, S. (2017). “Angel investing in an austerity economy – the impact of government policies in Portugal”. European Planning Studies (http://www.tandfonline.com/eprint/r9MbExSRUItfte6AFFRZ/ful) [ABS2]
- Sarkar, S., Osiyevskyy, O. (2017). “Organizational Innovation and Rigidity During Crisis: a Review of the Paradox and a Research Agenda”. European Management Journal March, 2017, doi:10.1016/j.emj.2017.03.007 [ABS2]
- Calisto, M. L., Sarkar, S. (2017). “Organizations as biomes of entrepreneurial life: Towards a clarification of the corporate entrepreneurship process”. Journal of Business Research, 70, 44-54. doi:10.1016/j.jbusres.2016.07.007 [ABS3]
- Calisto, M. L., Sarkar, S. (2017). “Innovation and corporate entrepreneurship in service businesses”. Service Business, 1-20. doi:10.1007/s11628-016-0321-6 [ABS1]
- Sarkar, S., Pansera, M. (2017). “Sustainability-driven innovation at the bottom: Insights from grassroots ecopreneurs”. Technological Forecasting and Social Change, 114, 327-338. doi:10.1016/j.techfore.2016.08.029 [ABS3]
- Sarkar, S. (2016). “Uncorking knowledge - purposeful spillovers as a strategic tool for capability enhancement in the cork industry”. International Entrepreneurship and Management Journal, 1-25. doi:10.1007/s11365-016-0395-6 [ABS1]
- Pansera, M., Sarkar, S. (2016). “Crafting Sustainable Development Solutions: Frugal Innovations of Grassroots Entrepreneurs”. Sustainability, 8(1), 51. doi:10.3390/su8010051 [IF: 3.51]
- Sarkar, S., Searcy, C. (2016). “Zeitgeist or chameleon? A quantitative analysis of CSR definitions”. Journal of Cleaner Production, 135, 1423-1435. doi:10.1016/j.jclepro.2016.06.157 [ABS2]
- Sarkar, S., Coelho, D. M., M. L. Maroco, J. (2016). “Strategic Orientations, Dynamic Capabilities, and Firm Performance: An Analysis for Knowledge Intensive Business Services”. Journal of the Knowledge Economy, 7(4), 1000-1020. doi:10.1007/s13132-016-04153
- Bilau, J., Sarkar, S. (2016). “Financing innovative start-ups in Portuguese context: what is the role of business angels' networks?” Journal of the Knowledge Economy, 7(4), 920-934. doi:10.1007/s13132-015-0304-1 [ABS1]
- Carvalho, L., Sarkar, S. (2014). “Market structures, strategy and innovation in tourism sector”, International Journal of Culture, Tourism, and Hospitality Research [Socpus: 2.7]
- Duarte, V., Sarkar, S. (2011). "Separating the wheat from the chaff - a taxonomy of open innovation", European Journal of Innovation Management, 14(4), 435-459. [ABS1]
- Sarkar, S. (2008). "Is UEFA right? Measuring competitiveness of domestic football leagues", International Journal of Sport Management and Marketing, 3(4), 374-382. [ABS1]
- Pires, C., Sarkar, S., Carvalho, L. (2008). "Innovation in services – how different from manufacturing?", Service Industries Journal, 28(10), 1339-1356. [ABS2]
- Sarkar, S., Pires, C., Carvalho, L. (2008), "Innovation behavior in financial services: an empirical analysis", International Journal of Financial Services Management, 3(3/4), 223-242.
- Sarkar, S., Costa, A. (2008). "Dynamics of open innovation in the food industry", Trends in Food Science and Technology, 19(11), 574-580. [IF: 12.56]
- Sarkar, S. (2007). "Gazelle in elephant's clothing - an integrated model of outsourcing", International Journal of Indian Culture and Business Management, 1(1/2), 116-135. [ABS1]
- Sarkar, S. (2005). “Innovation and Market Structures: an integrated approach”, International Journal of Entrepreneurship and Innovation Management, 5(5/6), 366-378. [ABS1]
- Pires, C., Sarkar, S. (2000). “Delivered Non-Linear Pricing by Duopolists”, Regional Science and Urban Economics, 30(4), 429-456. [ABS3]
- Haughton, J., Sarkar, S. (1996). “Gasoline Tax as a Corrective Tax: Estimates for the United States, 1970-1991”, Energy Journal, 17(2), 103-126. [ABS3]
