= Willy van Ryckeghem =

Belgian economist and consumerist

Willy van Ryckeghem (Ghent, 1935) is a Belgian economist and consumerist who made an international career. He studied economics in Ghent, Copenhagen and Paris and taught Business cycles at Vrije Universiteit Brussel and Econometrics at Ghent University from 1968 to 1982. He was also visiting Associate Professor at the University of North Carolina at Chapel Hill in 1963-64 and Visiting Professor at the Universiti Sains Malaysia in Penang in 1976.

His first experience in Latin America was in Argentina at the Consejo Nacional de Desarrollo (Conade) in 1964-65 where he worked under the auspices of the Harvard Development Advisory Service (DAS). He teamed with British economist Geoffrey Maynard to develop a stabilization model which was applied by the following administration during the period 1967-1970. After initial success in reducing the inflation rate from 22 to 7 percent without causing a major recession, the stabilization effort broke down in 1970 after a meat shortage caused a new inflationary shock. He also teamed with Hernan Aldabe to develop the first simulation model of the Argentine cattle stock.

His next assignment was under the auspices of the so-called Berkeley-Group in Brazil at the newly created IPEA, where he constructed the country`s first input-output table for 1959. In addition, he invented an exact formula for determining the technology matrix in a situation with secondary products.

In 1972-73, he joined the University of Michigan team of economic advisors to the Planning Ministry of Morocco. This resulted in the publication of the collective book Employment Problems and Policies in Developing Countries-The Case of Morocco of which he was the editor at the Rotterdam University Press in 1976.

In 1974, he became President of the prestigious Belgian Statistical Society. The same year, he published in the International Statistical Review an original method for estimating measurement errors in national account statistics. He was invited as keynote speaker at the Commemoration of the 100th Anniversary of the death of Adolphe Quetelet.

In 1976, he published together with Geoffrey Maynard A World of Inflation. In this book, they distanced themselves from the dominant monetarist thinking, and drew attention to structural factors in explaining differences in inflation rates between countries.

Also in 1976, he was invited by the I.L.O. to lead an employment mission to Portugal to assist the Portuguese government in preparing a basic needs strategy to address the critical unemployment situation the country was facing at the time. The findings of the mission were published in the book Employment and Basic Needs in Portugal published by the I.L.O. in 1979.

In 1982, he joined the Inter-American Development Bank in Washington DC where he led the Country Studies Division for seven years before becoming Deputy Manager of the Department of Economic and Social Development. In 1985 he presented a major study at the Latin American Studies Association (LASA) meeting at Albuquerque on the Impact of the Latin American debt crisis on the countries in the region.

After his retirement in 1997, he was instrumental in the creation in 2001 of the Brazilian non-profit organization Proteste, which became the largest consumer organization in Latin America. Between 1975 and 1978, he was the third President of Consumers International, following Colston Warne of Consumers Union and Peter Goldman of Which?. He was awarded the Order of Social Merit because of his work with the Belgian consumer movement. He is also Honorary Fellow of the Belgian-American Educational Foundation BAEF

He now lives in Madeira, doing research on the history of the island. He is also advisor to the philanthropic Matanel Foundation in Luxemburg.

== Selected publications ==
- The Structure of Some Macro-Economic Growth Models : A Comparison, Weltwirtschaftliches Archiv, Band 91, 1963, Heft 1. pp. 84–100
- Some Further Properties of Cobb-Douglas Growth Models, The Southern Economic Journal, Vol. XXXI, No. 1, July 1964
- The Effect of Information on Consumers` Attitudes toward Resale Price Maintenance (with Y. Langaskens) Applied Statistics, Vol. XV no 1, 1966, pp. 56–62
- The Stability of the Domar Model, Econometrica Vol. 34, No. 3, July 1966
- Public Finance and the Trade Balance : A Note on the Balanced-Foreign-Trade Multiplier, Economia Internazionale, Vol. XIX, No. 3, August 1966
- An exact method for determining the technology matrix in a situation with secondary products, Review of Economics and Statistics, vol. 49 (1967), pp. 607–08.
- The Secret of the Variable ICOR, The Economic Journal December 1968, Vol. LXXVIII, pp. 984–85
- Stabilization Policy in an Inflationary Economy - Argentina (with G. Maynard) in: Development Policy - Theory and Practice Edited by Gustav F. Papanek, Harvard University Press, 1968
- An Econometric Model of minimum wages and employment in a dual economy: the Case of Puerto Rico, in: Tijdschrift voor Sociale Wetenschappen, Gent 1969 nr. 4 pp. 100-121.
- An Intersectorial Consistency Model for Economic Planning in Brazil, in: The Economy of Brazil Edited by H.S.Ellis, University of California Press, 1969
- Politicas de Estabilizacion para una Economia Inflacionaria, in Desarrollo Economico, Buenos Aires, Julio-Setiembre 1972
- Argentina 1967-70 : A Stabilization Attempt that Failed (with G. Maynard) in Banca Nazionale del Lavoro Quarterly Review, Rome December 1972.
- A New Method to estimate Measurement Errors in National Account Statistics,(with Y. Langaskens) in : International Statistical Review, Vol. 42, No. 3, 1974, pp. 283-90
- Employment Problems and Policies in Developing Countries (Ed.) Rotterdam University Press, 1976. ISBN 9023722728
- A World of Inflation (with G. Maynard) Batsford, London 1976 ISBN 0713430680
- Why Inflation Rates Differ (with G. Maynard) in Inflation in Small Countries Ed. H. Frisch, Springer Verlag, Berlin 1976.
- Inflation and Exchange Rates (with G. Maynard) in : The European Economy beyond the Crisis Ed. G.R.Denton and J.J.N. Cooper, Bruges 1977.
- Es eficiente el mercado secundario de la deuda? Revista de la Integracion y el Desarrollo Centroamericano, Agosto 1988 pp. 128-35.
- The Transformation of Latin America : A Long-Term View, in Global Change and Transformation, Economic Essays in Honor of Karsten Laursen Handelshojskolens Forlag, Copenhagen 1993. ISBN 8716132157
- Trade and Investment Flows between Europe and Latin America and the Caribbean (with Caroline Beetz), in :Latin America`s Competitive Position in the Enlarged European Market. Bernhard Fischer/Albrecht von Gleich (eds.) Nomos Verlagsgesellschaft, Baden Baden 1994.
- Domestic Policy Variables and Foreign Direct Investment Inflows in Latin America, in Essays in Honour of Professor Sylvain Plasschaert. P.K.M.Tharakan/ D. Van Den Bulcke, eds. Springer 1995
- O Mito das Metas de Inflacao (The Myth of Inflation Targeting), in Valor Economico, Sao Paulo, 3-10-2011
- Bound for Sugar : Flemish Traders on Madeira, in "The Low Countries" 13-5-2019
