= Fernando Reimers =

Venezuelan-born American scholar of comparative and international education

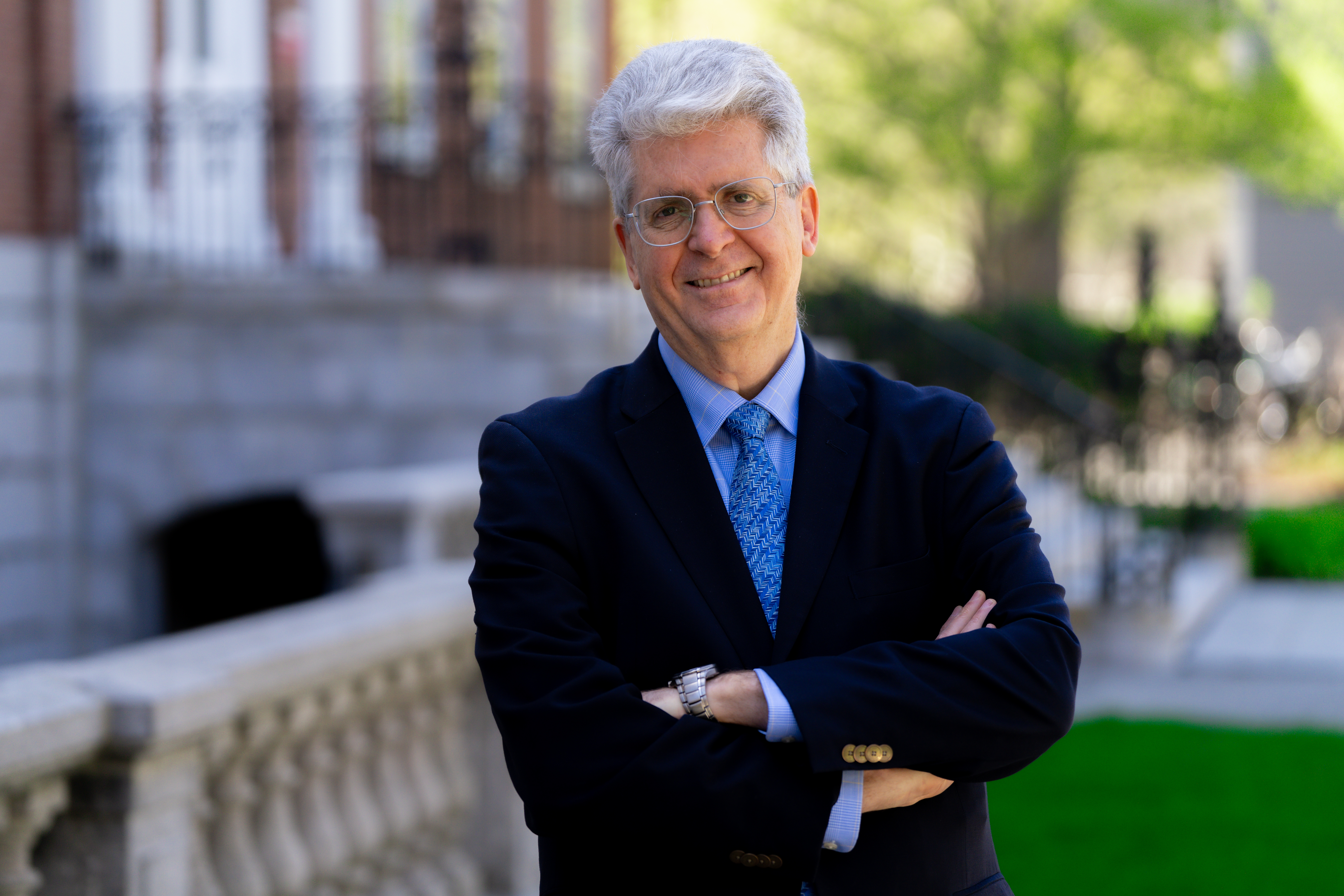
Fernando M. Reimers at Harvard Graduate School of Education

Fernando Miguel Reimers is a Venezuelan-born American scholar and practitioner of international and comparative education based at the Harvard Graduate School of Education (HGSE), where he is the Ford Foundation Professor of the Practice of International Education and director of the Global Education Innovation Initiative. His work focuses on how education systems can better prepare students to thrive in the twenty-first century—especially through competencies related to civic participation, global citizenship, sustainability, and the United Nations Sustainable Development Goals (SDGs)—and on how policy, leadership, and teacher professional development can support large-scale educational improvement. He has worked extensively across Latin America and globally as an educator, researcher, advisor and program-builder, and has been associated with major international education efforts including UNESCO’s International Commission on the Futures of Education.

== Early life and education ==
Reimers was born in Venezuela to immigrant parents. He graduated magna cum laude in psychology from the Central University of Venezuela (Universidad Central de Venezuela). His undergraduate thesis, examining the educational implications of learning theories, was approved with distinction and recommended for publication by the university press.

After graduation he taught experimental psychology at the Central University of Venezuela before relocating to Cambridge, Massachusetts, to pursue master’s and doctoral studies in educational planning and social policy at the Harvard Graduate School of Education. He obtained an Ed.M. and an Ed.D. in education from Harvard University. His doctoral dissertation, which examined the impact of the external debt crisis on education finance in Latin America, was published by UNESCO.

== Academic career and institutional leadership ==
Upon completing his doctoral studies, Reimers joined the Harvard Institute for International Development (HIID), where he conducted research and education policy advisory work in Pakistan, Egypt, Jordan, Honduras, El Salvador, Colombia and Paraguay. He conducted a large study of the effectiveness of elementary schools in Pakistan based on a probabilistic sample of 500 schools and designed similar studies in Egypt and Jordan. He also conducted a study of the determinants of repetition and dropout in rural schools in Honduras and carried out sector assessments in El Salvador and Paraguay, where he led a large advisory project for a national education reform.

In 1996, after reaching the level of Fellow of the Institute at HIID, he took a leave of absence to join the World Bank as Senior Education Specialist. There he led the design of a large education reform assistance program in Mexico and oversaw education portfolios in Mexico and Peru.

In 1998, Reimers was appointed Associate Professor at the Harvard Graduate School of Education, where he created the International Education Policy (IEP) master’s program. In 2006 he was named Ford Foundation Professor of the Practice of International Education. He co-chairs the concentration in Global, International and Comparative Education, which cuts across HGSE master’s programs, and co-chairs the master’s program in International Education Policy and Management.

Reimers is the founding director of the Global Education Innovation Initiative, a cross-national collaborative focused on education innovation and the development of twenty-first-century skills in K–12 education.

== Research themes and policy influence ==
Reimers’ research agenda focuses on the advancement of educational opportunity for disadvantaged children, on the purposes of education in a rapidly changing world, and on the system-level conditions that allow schools to cultivate “whole” learners (cognitive, civic, ethical, and social). The Global Education Innovation Initiative, which he created and directs, has studied K–12 programs that develop twenty-first-century skills and later examined the impact of the COVID-19 pandemic on education systems and options to “build back better”.

A distinctive element of his policy work is his effort to connect global goals—especially the SDGs—to curriculum, instructional practice, and education reform. Reimers was invited in 2019 to join UNESCO’s Commission on the Futures of Education, tasked with preparing a global report on the purposes of education under conditions of rapid social and technological change; the Commission produced the report Reimagining Our Futures Together: A New Social Contract for Education.

During the COVID-19 crisis, his public-facing work included policy frameworks and comparative studies of education systems’ responses to disruption. He co-authored with Andreas Schleicher the report A Framework to Guide an Education Response to the COVID-19 Pandemic of 2020, hosted by the OECD, to support education decision-makers.

He has also examined the relationship between education and climate change. His book (with Margaret Wang-Aghania) Education for a Climate Changed World proposes a systemic framework for understanding first- and second-order effects of climate change in and through education.

== Teaching approach and public-facing writing ==
Reimers has developed signature pedagogical approaches that emphasize practice-facing teaching by engaging students in applied problem-solving. HGSE coverage of his teaching during the COVID-19 pandemic described how his courses engaged students in comparative analysis across countries and direct work with “clients” to mitigate negative impacts—an approach he frames as teaching students that they can “be part of the solution” rather than being overwhelmed by problems. He often invites students to extend course-based work on complex educational challenges into co-authored publications.

His edited open-access volume Education and Climate Change: The Role of Universities positions higher education institutions as partners in climate change education and curricular innovation and demonstrates an approach to teaching about climate change by engaging students in developing place-based climate education curricula in jurisdictions around the world.

Beyond academic writing, Reimers has written for general audiences and for children, including books designed to foster intergenerational conversations about inclusive values. His children’s book The Story of Filomena launched a series focused on empathy, diversity and global citizenship.

== Selected works ==
Reimers has written or edited a large body of work on global citizenship education, comparative education policy, instructional improvement, system reform during crisis, artificial intelligence and education, and climate change and education.

=== Books (authored or co-authored) ===
- Reimers, F. and Wang-Aghania, M. Education for a Climate Changed Future. Springer, 2026.
- Reimers, F., Azim, Z., Palomo, M. R. and Callysta, T. Artificial Intelligence and Education in the Global South. A Systems Perspective. Springer, 2025.
- Reimers, F. Educating Students to Improve the World. Springer, 2020. (Also published in Spanish and Turkish.)
- Reimers, F., Ortega, M. E. and Dyer, P. Learning to Improve the World. How Injaz Al-Arab Helps Youth in the Middle East Develop an Entrepreneurial Mindset. Charleston, SC: CreateSpace, 2018.
- Reimers, F. Teaching Two Lessons About UNESCO and Other Lessons on Human Rights. Charleston, SC: CreateSpace, 2017.
- Reimers, F. Formar Lectores y Ciudadanos. Desafíos de la Escuela en América Latina. Charleston, SC: CreateSpace, 2017.
- Reimers, F. (ed.) One Student at a Time. The Challenges of Global Education Leadership. Charleston, SC: CreateSpace, 2017. (Also published in Spanish.)
- Reimers, F., Chopra, V., Chung, C., Higdon, J. and O’Donnell, E. B. Empowering Global Citizens. Charleston, SC: CreateSpace, 2016. (Published in Spanish in 2018 and Portuguese in 2017.)
- Reimers, F. and Jacobs, J. Leer (Comprender y Aprender) y Escribir para Comunicarse. Desafíos y Oportunidades para los Sistemas Educativos. Madrid: Editorial Santillana, 2008.
- Reimers, F. and McGinn, N. Informed Dialogue. Changing Education Policies Around the World. Praeger Publishers, 1997. (Published in Spanish as Diálogo Informado, Centro de Estudios Educativos, Mexico, 2000.)
- Reimers, F., McGinn, N. and Wild, K. Confronting Future Challenges: Educational Information, Research and Decision-Making. UNESCO International Bureau of Education, 1995.
- Warwick, D. and Reimers, F. Hope or Despair? Primary Education in Pakistan. Praeger Publishers, 1995.
- Reimers, F. and Tiburcio, L. Education, Adjustment and Reconstruction: Options for Change. Paris: UNESCO, 1993. (Also published in French and Spanish.)
- Reimers, F. Educación para todos en América Latina en el siglo XXI. Los desafíos de la estabilización y el ajuste para la planificación educativa. Caracas: CINTERPLAN, 1991.
- Reimers, F. Deuda externa y financiamiento de la educación. Su impacto en Latinoamérica. Santiago: UNESCO, 1990.
- Reimers, F. A New Scenario for Educational Planning and Management in Latin America. The Impact of the External Debt. Paris: UNESCO International Institute for Educational Planning, 1990.
- Reimers, F. Deuda Externa y Financiamiento de la Educación. Su Impacto en Latinoamérica. Santiago: UNESCO-OREALC, 1990.

=== Children's Books ===
Fernando Reimers has authored or co-authored five children’s books that invite children and adults to explore empathy, friendship, diversity, global citizenship, and care for the natural world through shared reading and conversation.: The Story of Filomena, Filomena's Friends Filomena's Seasons and Filomena's Teachers, and with Elisa Guerra The Voices of the Trees.

=== Books (edited) ===
- Reimers, F. (ed.) Schools and Society During the COVID-19 Pandemic. Springer, 2023.
- Vincent-Lancrin, S., Cobo, C. and Reimers, F. (eds.) How Learning Continued During the COVID-19 Pandemic: Global Lessons from Initiatives to Support Learners and Teachers. Paris: OECD, 2022.
- Reimers, F. and Opertti, R. (eds.) Learning to Build Back Better Futures for Education: Lessons from Educational Innovation During the COVID-19 Pandemic. Geneva: UNESCO International Bureau of Education, 2021. (Also published in Spanish.)
- Reimers, F. (ed.) Primary and Secondary Education During COVID-19. Cham, Switzerland: Springer, 2021. (Also published in Spanish.)
- Reimers, F. and Marmolejo, F. (eds.) University and School Collaborations During a Pandemic: Sustaining Educational Opportunity and Reinventing Education. Cham, Switzerland: Springer, 2021. (Also published in Spanish.)
- Reimers, F. (ed.) Leading Educational Change During a Pandemic. Independently published, 2021.
- Reimers, F. (ed.) Leading Education Through COVID-19: Upholding the Right to Education. Independently published, 2020.
- Reimers, F. (ed.) Liderando Sistemas Educativos Durante la Pandemia de COVID-19. Independently published, 2020.
- Reimers, F. (ed.) Implementing Deeper Learning and 21st Century Education Reforms. Springer, 2020.
- Reimers, F. (ed.) Audacious Education Purposes. How Governments Transform the Goals of Education Systems. Springer, 2020. (Also published in Arabic and Spanish.)
- Reimers, F. (ed.) Letters to a New Minister of Education. Independently published, 2019. (Also published in Portuguese and Spanish by the Organization of Ibero-American States.)
- Reimers, F., Adams, R. and Berka, M. Creative Lessons to Open Classrooms and Minds to the World. Washington, DC: The NEA Foundation, 2019.
- Reimers, F. and Chung, C. (eds.) Preparing Teachers to Educate Whole Students: An International Comparative Study. Cambridge, MA: Harvard Education Publishing, 2018. (Also published in Spanish and Arabic.)
- Reimers, F., Barzano, G., Fisichella, L. and Lissoni, M. Cittadinanza globale e sviluppo sostenibile. Milan: Pearson, 2018.
- Reimers, F., Adams, R. and Shannon, K. Twelve Lessons to Open Classrooms and Minds to the World. Washington, DC: The NEA Foundation, 2018.
- Reimers, F. (ed.) Empowering All Students at Scale. Charleston, SC: CreateSpace, 2017. (Published in Portuguese and Spanish.)
- Reimers, F. and O’Donnell, E. B. (eds.) Fifteen Letters on Education in Singapore. (Published in Spanish as Quince Cartas Sobre la Educación en Singapur, 2016.)
- Reimers, F. and Chung, C. (eds.) Teaching and Learning for the Twenty-First Century. Cambridge: Harvard Education Press, 2016. (Published in Arabic, Chinese, Portuguese, Spanish and Turkish.)
- Reimers, F. (ed.) Aprender Más y Mejor. Políticas, Programas y Oportunidades de Aprendizaje en Educación Básica en México. Fondo de Cultura Económica, Mexico City, 2006.
- Reimers, F. (ed.) Unequal Schools, Unequal Chances: The Challenges to Educational Opportunity in the Americas at the End of the 20th Century. David Rockefeller Center for Latin American Studies/Harvard University Press, Cambridge, MA, 2000. (Published in Spanish as Escuelas Desiguales, Oportunidades Diferentes, Editorial Arco-La Muralla, Madrid, 2002.)
- Reimers, F. (ed.) Educación en El Salvador. San Salvador: UCA Editores, 1995.
- Reimers, F. (ed.) Análisis del Sistema Educativo en el Paraguay. Asunción: Centro Paraguayo de Estudios Sociológicos, 1993.

=== Books (edited with work from his students) ===
- Reimers, F., Azim, Z., Begi, M., Chia, J. and Shifat, M. N. (eds.) Leading Education Systems: Learning from Policy Challenges and Practices Around the World. Independently published, 2026.
- Reimers, F., Ardiana, K., Heng, S. and Thony, C. (eds.) Learning Education Policy in Practice: Comparative Analyses from Classrooms to Systems. Independently published, 2026.
- Reimers, F., Wang-Aghania, M., Chia, J., Heng, S. and Nguyen, N. (eds.) Global Challenges, Local Solutions: Advancing Equity, Innovation, and Sustainability in Education. Independently published, 2025.
- Reimers, F. (ed.) Quality Education for All for a Better World. Learning from the Sustainable Development Goals. Independently published, 2024.
- Reimers, F., Chia, J., Choudhury, P., Heng, S., Nguyen, N. and Warren, W. (eds.) Learning Education Policy to Make the World Better. Volumes 1 and 2. Independently published, 2024.
- Reimers, F., Bhuradia, A., Kenyon, C., Liu, Y., Nguyen, N. and Wang, M. (eds.) Rebuilding Resilient Education Systems After the COVID-19 Pandemic. Independently published, 2023.
- Reimers, F., Budler, T., Irele, I., Kenyon, C., Ovitt, S. and Pitcher, C. (eds.) Collaborations to Reimagine Our Futures Together. Advancing a New Social Contract for Education. Independently published, 2022.
- Reimers, F. (ed.) Opciones para Reimaginar Juntos Nuestros Futuros. Diálogos para Un Nuevo Contrato Social Para la Educación. Independently published, 2022.
- Reimers, F., Amaechi, U., Banerji, A. and Wang, M. (eds.) Education to Build Back Better. What Can We Learn from Education Reform for a Post-Pandemic World. Cham, Switzerland: Springer, 2022.
- Reimers, F., Amaechi, U., Banerji, A. and Wang, M. (eds.) An Educational Calamity. Learning and Teaching During the COVID-19 Pandemic. Independently published, 2021.
- Reimers, F. (ed.) Education and Climate Change. Springer, 2020. (Also published in Spanish.)
- Reimers, F. (ed.) Empowering Teachers to Build a Better World. How Six Nations Support Teachers for 21st Century Education. Springer, 2020. (Also published in Portuguese and Spanish.)
- Reimers, F. et al. Learning to Collaborate to Advance the Global Common Good. Charleston, SC: CreateSpace, 2018.
- Reimers, F. et al. Empowering Students to Improve the World in Sixty Lessons. Charleston, SC: CreateSpace, 2017. (Published in Arabic, Chinese, Italian, Portuguese, Turkish and Spanish.)

== Recognition, professional service, and global roles ==
Reimers has received academic honors, professional awards and recognitions including election to the U.S. National Academy of Education (2023), fellowship in the International Academy of Education (since 2006), an honorary doctorate from Emerson College (2009) for work related to global education and international human rights, the Institute of International Education’s Centennial Medal Award (2019), and the Committee on Teaching About the United Nations’ Global Citizenship Award (2017). In 2025 he received the Enrique Anderson-Imbert Award from the North American Academy of the Spanish Language for his contributions to the promotion of Spanish culture and language. In 2026 he was elected president of the International Academy of Education.

In 2019 he was invited to join UNESCO’s Commission on the Futures of Education, which produced the report Reimagining Our Futures Together: A New Social Contract for Education. His service includes governance and advisory roles with education organizations and international programs, and extensive advisory work across countries and international development agencies.

== Personal life ==
Reimers is married to Eleonora Villegas-Reimers, Clinical Professor of Education at Boston University. They have two sons: Tomas Reimers, a technology entrepreneur, and Pablo Reimers, a neuroscientist. His brother Carlos Reimers is a Professor of Architecture at Morgan State University.
