= Grace Goodell =

American academic

Grace E. Goodell is a retired professor of International Development at The Johns Hopkins School of Advanced International Studies in Washington, DC. Goodell received her Ph.D. in anthropology from Columbia University, where she studied under Conrad Arensberg. She has been a visiting scholar at the Australian National University and at the Harvard Institute for International Development, a fellow in law and development at the Harvard Law School, and a fellow at the Woodrow Wilson International Center for Scholars. Goodell was previously the Director of the Program on Social Change and Development at Johns Hopkins; this program had an approach to grassroots development that was unique among all renowned graduate level foreign affairs schools in the United States. During her tenure she started the Heartland Center for Leadership Development, a community development leadership training program for inner-city Washington, D.C.

Her principal work was The elementary structures of political life : rural development in Pahlavi Iran, Oxford University Press, 1966; according to WorldCat, it is held in 302 libraries
