= Geoffrey Maynard =

British economist

Geoffrey Maynard

Geoffrey Walter Maynard (27 October 1921 – 9 September 2017) was a British economist.

Born in Tottenham and educated at the local grammar school (alongside another future economist, Ralph Harris), Maynard served with the RAF in the north African theatre during the Second World War. After the war, he was offered a place at the London School of Economics, where he specialized in Keynesian macro-economics and developed an early interest in the economics of inflation. During a tenure as Fellow in Political Economy at Johns Hopkins University, Baltimore, he was encouraged by future Nobel Prize winner Simon Kuznets to work on the relationship between growth and inflation. This led to the publication in 1962 of his book Economic Development and the Price Level which became a classic and went through a second edition in 1972. In this book, he followed Keynes's distinction between income and profit inflation and applied it to an early two-sector framework between the agricultural sector and the rest of the economy. He accorded great importance to the terms of trade between the two sectors as a determinant of inflation. He applied this analysis in country chapters on the United States, Great Britain, Japan, Russia and Latin American countries, with a special emphasis on Argentina.

During a stint with the Harvard Development Advisory Service in Argentina, he teamed with Belgian economist Willy van Ryckeghem to design a stabilization model of inflation in which several policy instruments are combined to reduce inflation and avoid a recession. The Maynard-van Ryckeghem model was applied between 1967 and 1970 and brought inflation down from 20 to 7 per cent, while achieving growth of 4 per cent per annum. Bank credits played a central role in preventing a recession. Later, in their post mortem of the Argentine experience, the authors blamed the ultimate failure of the stabilization attempt on an unforeseen surge in beef prices following a meat shortage. In their other joint work A World of Inflation, published in 1976, they resisted the prevailing monetarism of the seventies, and tested international differences in inflation rates by various structural variables, such as structural unemployment rates and differential productivity growth rates between tradeables and nontradeables.

Geoffrey Maynard was for 25 years professor of economics at the University of Reading and editor of the Bankers' Magazine. He also served as deputy chief economic adviser in the British Treasury under the then Chancellor of the Exchequer, Denis Healey, from 1974 onwards, where he was a lone voice against incomes policy whilst remaining supportive of a cut in public spending to offset the jump in oil prices. He was later interviewed by Margaret Thatcher to become her chief economic adviser, but their memorable meeting was cut short after Maynard risked to answer "Yes, but..." to Mrs. Thatcher's dogmatic views, to which she answered: "No buts..." and ended the meeting. He then became director of economics at Chase Manhattan Bank and special advisor to David Rockefeller instead. He later got his revenge in his book The Economy under Mrs. Thatcher, which was critical but not entirely unfavourable to her policies.

== Selected publications ==
- The Control of Inflation. Fabian Society, London, 1957.
- Economic Development and the Price Level. Macmillan, London, 1962, 1963 and 1972. ISBN 0678070164
- Stabilization Policy in an Inflationary Economy - Argentina (With[ Willy van Ryckeghem]) in: Development Policy : Theory and Practice. Edited by Gustav F. Papanek. Harvard University Press, 1968.
- Argentina 1967-70 : A Stabilization Attempt that Failed (With Willy van Ryckeghem) in : Banca Nazionale del Lavoro Quarterly Review, December 1972 pp. 396-412.
- Special drawing rights and development aid. Overseas Development Council, Washington, 1972.
- A World of Inflation. Batsford, London, 1976. (With Willy van Ryckeghem) ISBN 0713430680
- Why Inflation Rates Differ : a Critical Examination of the Structural Hypothesis (With W. van Ryckeghem) in : Inflation in Small Countries, Vienna 1974, Edited by H. Frisch, (ISBN 0-387-07624-7)
- Inflation and Exchange Rates (with W. van Ryckeghem) in : The European Economy beyond the Crisis. Edited by G.R.Denton and J.J.N.Cooper, Bruges 1977
- Monetary policies in open economies. Societe Universitaire Europeene de Recherches Financieres, 1978.
- The Economy Under Mrs. Thatcher. Basil Blackwell, Oxford, 1988. ISBN 0631158758
