= Alex Matthiessen =

American environmentalist

Alex Matthiessen (born July 3, 1964) is an environmentalist and lives in New York City. He is the son of author and naturalist Peter Matthiessen.

== Biography ==
Matthiessen graduated from the University of California, Santa Cruz in 1988 with a BA in Biology and Environmental Studies, and earned his Masters of Public Administration from the Harvard Kennedy School in 1995.

Matthiessen began his activist career in 1990 as the grassroots program director for the Rainforest Action Network in San Francisco. In this capacity, he organized and managed an international network of affiliate activist groups. During the summer of 1994, he interned at the White House Council on Environmental Quality. From 1995 to 1996, Matthiessen worked for the Harvard Institute for International Development (HIID) as a macroeconomic policy analyst in the Indonesian Ministry of Finance.

In 1997, Matthiessen was appointed as a special assistant to the U.S. Department of the Interior, where he worked on matters of special importance for Interior Secretary Bruce Babbitt. He managed a multi-agency task force charged with reforming the hydropower licensing process of the Federal Energy Regulatory Commission. He was also co-creator and head of the Green Energy Parks initiative, a joint program between the Department of the Interior's National Park Service and the Department of Energy, which promotes renewable and energy efficient technology throughout the national park system. Matthiessen received a Presidential Award from the White House for his work on this project.

Matthiessen was Riverkeeper’s chief executive from 2000 to 2010 and served on the organization's board of directors during that time. Under his direction, Riverkeeper—an environmental non-profit that protects and defends the Hudson River and the New York City watershed—maintained a full-time patrol boat enforcement presence up and down the Hudson River and its tributaries, and extended its principal jurisdiction from north of Albany to New York Harbor. In addition to strengthening the group's traditional enforcement role, Matthiessen pushed the organization to develop long-term, preventative strategies designed to strengthen the deterrents and incentives necessary to avoid pollution.

Under Matthiessen's leadership, Riverkeeper joined forces with institutions such as Lamont–Doherty Earth Observatory, Columbia Law School, and Columbia University Graduate School of Architecture, Planning and Preservation, to enhance scientific understanding of the Hudson River, as well as stop what it views as ill-conceived development projects along the waterfront.

In 2006, Matthiessen served on New York State Governor Eliot Spitzer’s transition team as an advisor on the new administration's goals for energy and environmental policy. He also served as chair of the energy committee for Westchester County’s Climate Change Task Force as well as chair of the MTA Blue Ribbon Commission on Sustainability's water committee. Matthiessen also served on the boards of directors of the Hudson River Improvement Fund, Governor's Island Preservation and Education Corporation (GIPEC), and Waterkeeper Alliance—the umbrella organization for over 190 Waterkeeper programs around the world dedicated to protecting local water resources. He currently serves on the board of the Catskill Mountainkeeper.

In July, 2010, Matthiessen started an environmental consulting firm, Matthiessen Strategies, based in New York City.
