= Musical notation =

Visual representation of music

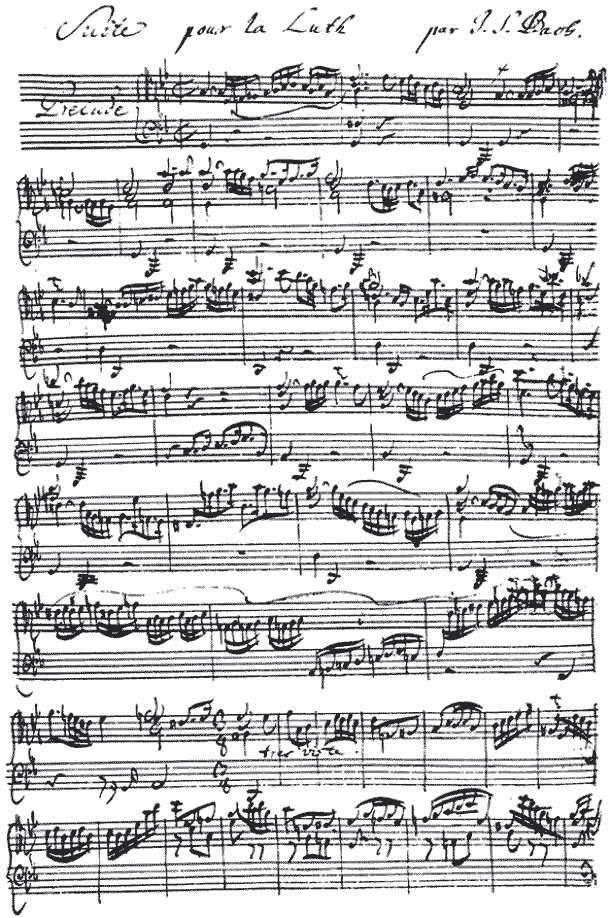
Hand-written musical notation by J. S. Bach (1685–1750). This is the beginning of the Prelude from the Suite for Lute in G minor, BWV 995 (transcription of Cello Suite No. 5 in C minor, BWV 1011).

Musical notation is any system used to visually represent music. Systems of notation generally represent the elements of a piece of music that are considered important for its performance in the context of a given musical tradition. The process of interpreting musical notation is often referred to as reading music.

Distinct methods of notation have been invented throughout history by various cultures. Much information about ancient music notation is fragmentary. Even in the same time frames, different styles of music and different cultures use different music notation methods.

For example, classical performers most often use sheet music using staves, time signatures, key signatures, and noteheads for writing and deciphering pieces. But even so, there are far more systems than just that. For instance, in professional country music, the Nashville Number System is the main method, and for string instruments such as guitar, it is quite common for tablature to be used by players.

Musical notation uses ancient and modern symbols made upon any media such as stone, clay tablets, papyrus, parchment or manuscript paper; printed using a printing press (c. 1400), a computer printer (c. 1980) or other printing or modern copying technology.

Although many ancient cultures used symbols to represent melodies and rhythms, none of them were particularly comprehensive, which has limited today's understanding of their music. The direct ancestor of the modern Western system of notation emerged in medieval Europe, in the context of the Christian Church's attempts to standardize the performance of plainsong melodies so that chants could be standardized across different areas. Notation developed further during the Renaissance and Baroque music eras. In the Classical period (1750–1820) and the Romantic music era (1820–1900), notation continued to develop as the technology for musical instruments advanced. In the contemporary classical music of the 20th and 21st centuries, music notation has evolved further, with the introduction of graphical notation by some modern composers and the use, since the 1980s, of computer-based scorewriter programs for notating music. Music notation has been adapted to many kinds of music, including classical music, popular music, and traditional music.

== History ==
=== Ancient Near East ===
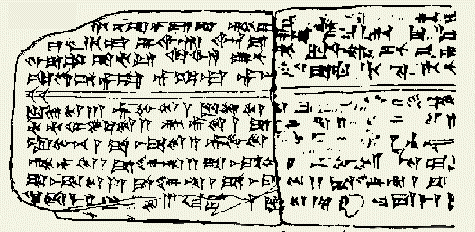
A tablet with the Hymn to Nikkal inscribed

The earliest form of musical notation can be found in a cuneiform tablet that was created at Nippur, in Babylonia (today's Iraq), in about 1400 BCE. The tablet represents fragmentary instructions for performing music, showing it was composed in harmonies of thirds using a diatonic scale.

A tablet from about 1250 BCE shows a more developed form of notation. Although the interpretation of the notation system is still controversial, it is clear that the notation indicates the names of strings on a lyre, the tuning of which is described in other tablets. Research indicates these notations had dual purposes for liturgical and secular musical pieces since music was essential in both religious ceremonies and courtly activities. Although they are fragmentary, these tablets represent the earliest notated melodies found anywhere in the world.

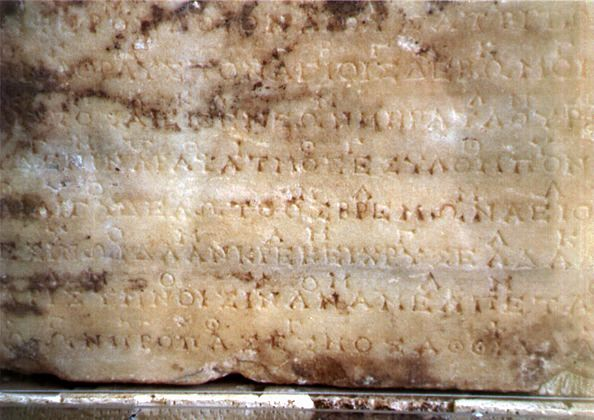
A photograph of the original stone at Delphi containing the second of the two Delphic Hymns to Apollo. The music notation is the line of occasional symbols above the main, uninterrupted line of Greek lettering.

=== Ancient Greece ===
Ancient Greek musical notation was in use from at least the 6th century BCE until approximately the 4th century CE; only few complete compositions (Seikilos epitaph, two Invocations to the Muse by Mesomedes, the Bellermann exercises) and around 40 fragmentary pieces using this notation survive.

The notation for sung music consists of letter symbols for the pitches, placed above text syllables. Rhythm is indicated in a rudimentary way only, with long and short symbols. The Seikilos epitaph has been variously dated between the 2nd century BCE to the 2nd century CE.

Three hymns by Mesomedes of Crete exist in manuscript. The Delphic Hymns, dated to the 2nd century BCE also use this notation, but they are not completely preserved.

Ancient Greek notation appears to have fallen out of use around the time of the decline of the Western Roman Empire.

=== Byzantine Empire ===
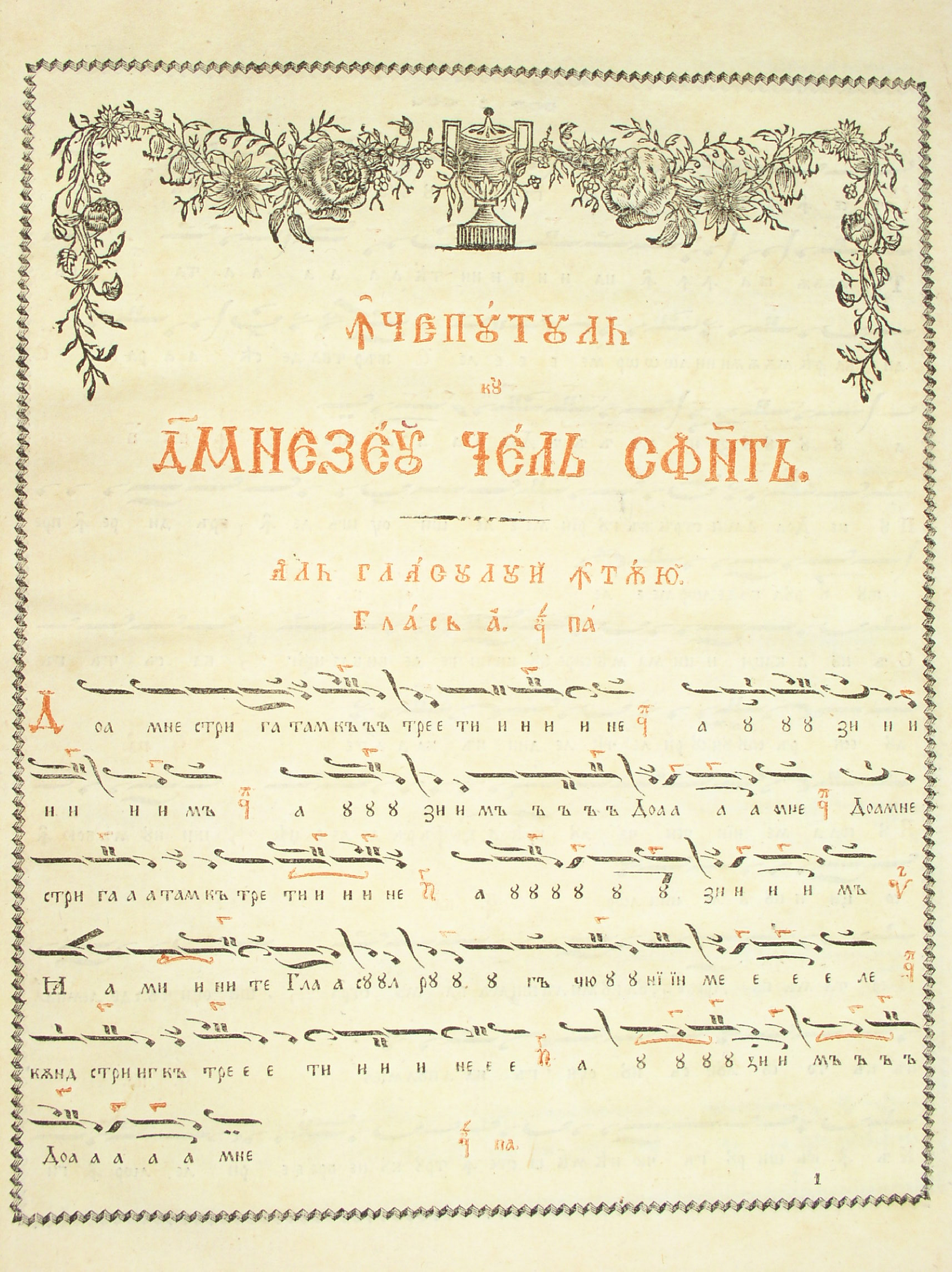
Byzantine music notation in the first edition (1823) of Macarie Ieromonahul's anastasimatarion, a hymnal with daily chant (including resurrection troparia called apolytikia anastasima) in oktoechos order, each section began with the evening psalm 140 (here section of echos protos with Romanian written in Cyrillic script)

Byzantine music once included music for court ceremonies, but has only survived as vocal church music within various Orthodox traditions of monodic (monophonic) chant written down in Byzantine round notation (see Macarie's anastasimatarion with the Greek text translated into Romanian and transliterated into its corresponding Cyrillic script).

Since the 6th century, Greek theoretical categories (melos, genos, harmonia, systema) played a key role in the understanding and transmission of Byzantine music, The tradition of Damascus, especially, had a strong impact on the pre-Islamic Near East comparable to that of Persian music. The earliest evidence are papyrus fragments of Greek tropologia. These fragments present the hymn text following a modal signature or key (like "ΠΛ Α" for echos plagios protos or "Β" for echos devteros).

Unlike Western notation, Byzantine neumes used since the 10th century were always related to modal steps (same modal degree, one degree lower, two degrees higher, etc.) in relation to such a clef or modal key (modal signatures). Originally this key or the incipit of a common melody was enough to indicate a certain melodic model given within the echos. Next to ekphonetic notation, only used in lectionaries to indicate formulas used during scriptural lessons, melodic notation developed not earlier than between the 9th and the 10th century, when a theta (θ), oxeia (/) or diple (//) were written under a certain syllable of the text whenever a longer melisma was expected. This primitive form was called "theta" or "diple notation".

The evolution of this notation can be observed in Greek monastic chant books like those of the sticherarion and the heirmologion. Chartres notation was used on Mount Athos and Constantinople, and Coislin notation was used within the patriarchates of Jerusalem and Alexandria, while another gestic notation was originally used for the asmatikon (choir book) and kontakarion (book of the soloist or monophonaris) of the Constantinopolitan cathedral rite. The earliest books which have survived, are "kondakars" in Slavonic translation which already show a notation system known as Kondakarian notation. Like the Greek alphabet, notational signs are ordered left to right (though the direction could be adapted, like in certain Syriac manuscripts). The question of rhythm was entirely based on cheironomia (the interpretation of so-called great signs which derived from different chant books). These great signs (μεγάλα σῃμάδια) indicated well-known melodic phrases given by gestures of the choirleaders of the cathedral rite. They existed once as part of an oral tradition, developed into Kondakarian notation and were integrated, during the 13th century, into Byzantine round notation as a kind of universal notation system.

Today, the main difference between Western and Eastern neumes is that Eastern notation symbols are "differential" rather than absolute, i.e., they indicate pitch steps (rising, falling or at the same step), and the musicians must deduce the specific intervals based on the musical context and their current pitch. These step symbols themselves, or better "phonic neumes", resemble brush strokes and are colloquially called gántzoi ('hooks') in modern Greek.

Notes as pitch classes or modal keys (usually memorised by modal signatures) are represented in written form only between these neumes (in manuscripts usually written in red ink). In modern notation they simply serve as optional reminders, with modal and tempo directions added when necessary. In Papadic notation medial signatures usually meant a temporary change into another echos.

The so-called "great signs" were once related to cheironomic signs; according to modern interpretations they are understood as embellishments and microtonal attractions (pitch changes smaller than a semitone), both essential in Byzantine chant.

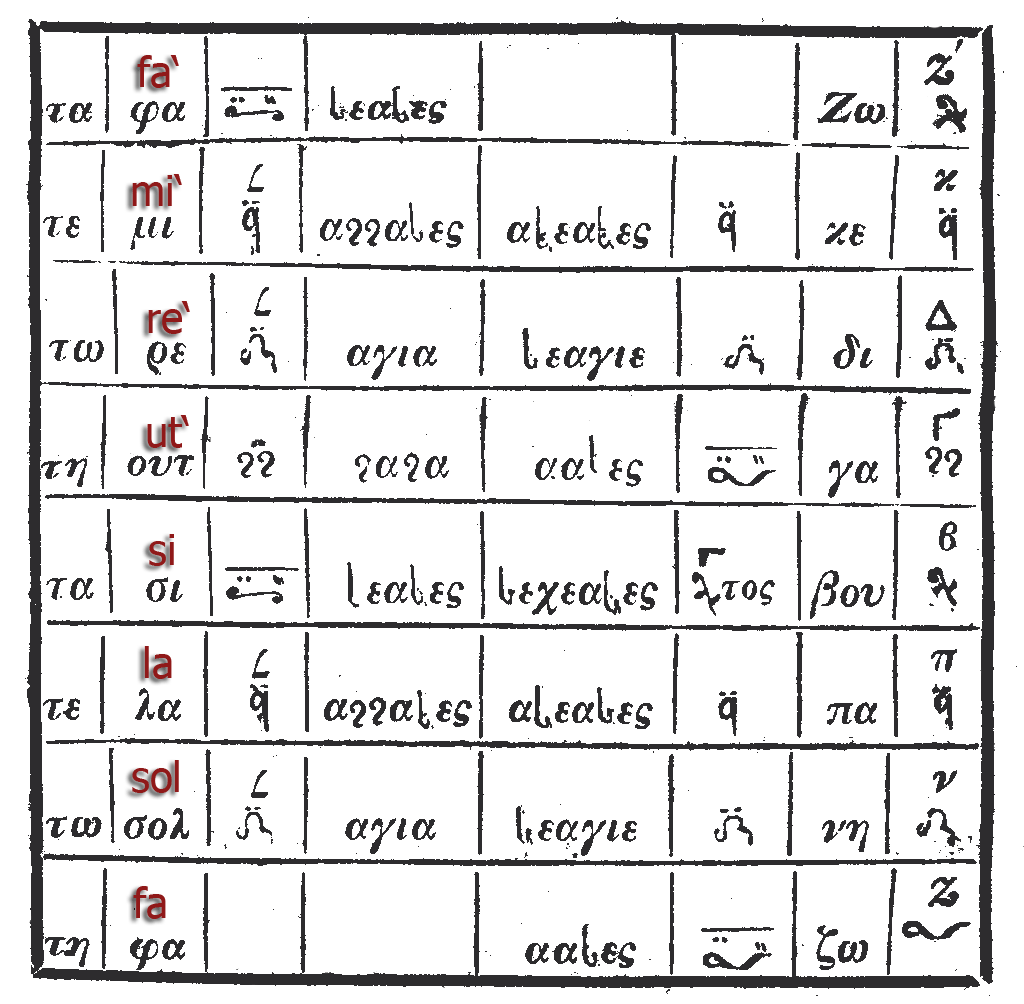
Chrysanthos's Kanonion with a comparison between Ancient Greek tetraphonia (column 1), Western Solfeggio, the Papadic Parallage (ascending: column 3 and 4; descending: column 5 and 6) according to the trochos system, and his heptaphonic parallage according to the New Method (syllables in the fore-last and martyriai in the last column))

Since Chrysanthos of Madytos there are seven standard note names used for "solfège" (parallagē) pá, vú, g^{h}á, d^{h}i, ké, zō, nē, while the older practice still used the four enechemata or intonation formulas of the four echoi given by the modal signatures, the authentic or kyrioi in ascending direction, and the plagal or plagioi in descending direction (Papadic Octoechos). With exception of vú and zō, they do roughly correspond to Western solmization syllables as re, mi, fa, sol, la, si, do. Byzantine music uses the eight natural, non-tempered scales whose elements were identified by Ēkhoi, "sounds", exclusively, and therefore the absolute pitch of each note may slightly vary each time, depending on the particular Ēkhos used. Byzantine notation is still used in many Orthodox Churches. Sometimes cantors also use transcriptions into Western or Kievan staff notation while adding non-notatable embellishment material from memory and "sliding" into the natural scales from experience. However, even in modern neume editions since the reform of Chrysanthos, many details rely on oral tradition passed down by traditional masters.

=== 13th-century Near East ===
In 1252, Safi al-Din al-Urmawi developed a form of musical notation where rhythms were represented by geometric shapes. Many subsequent scholars of rhythm have sought to develop graphical geometrical notations. For example, a similar geometric system was published in 1987 by Kjell Gustafson, whose method represents a rhythm as a two-dimensional graph. Rhythmic notation during its early stages developed Eastern musical traditions while simultaneously establishing concepts that Western music used to build its notation systems later on.

=== Early Europe ===
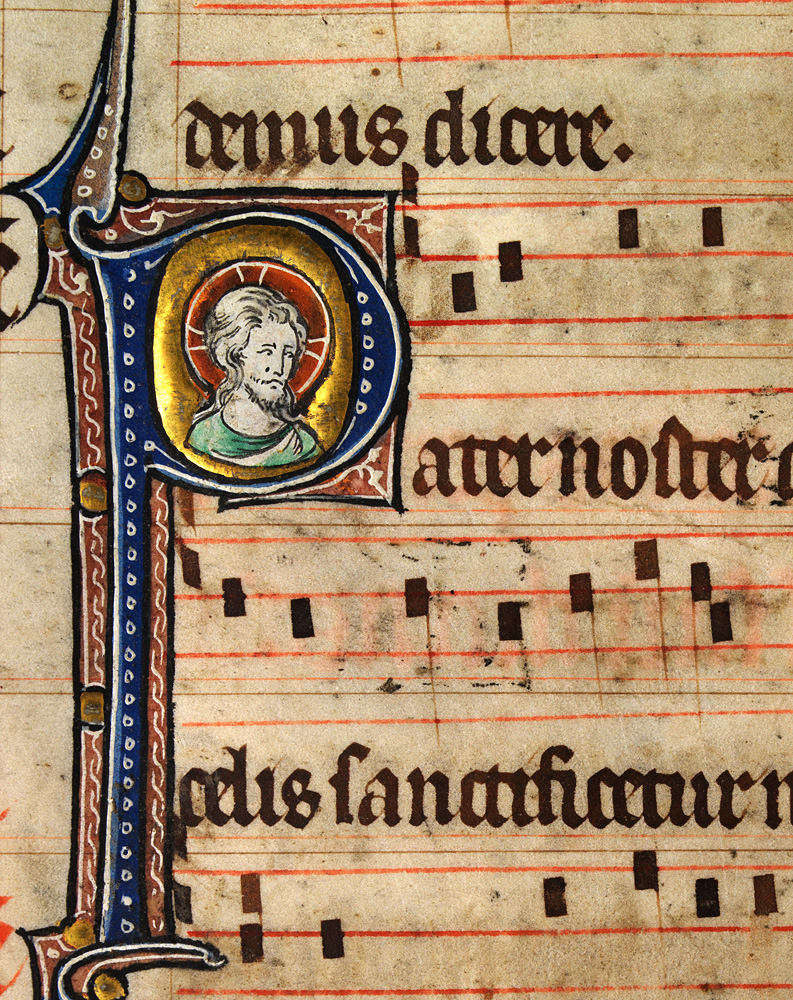
Music notation from an early 14th-century English Missal

The scholar and music theorist Isidore of Seville, while writing in the early 7th century, wrote that "unless sounds are held by the memory of man, they perish, because they cannot be written down." By the middle of the 9th century, however, a form of neumatic notation began to develop in monasteries in Europe as a mnemonic device for Gregorian chant, using symbols known as neumes; the earliest surviving musical notation of this type is in the Musica Disciplina of Aurelian of Réôme, from about 850. There are scattered survivals from the Iberian Peninsula before this time, of a type of notation known as Visigothic neumes, but its few surviving fragments have not yet been deciphered. The problem with this notation was that it only showed melodic contours and consequently the music could not be read by someone who did not know the music already.

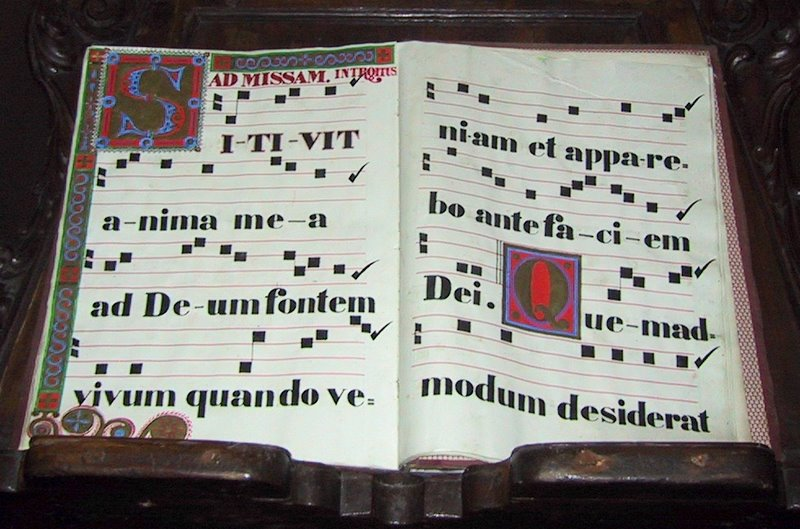
Early music notation in Latin, clearly marking neumes (date unknown, Florentian)

Notation had developed far enough to notate melody, but there was still no system for notating rhythm. A mid-13th-century treatise, De Mensurabili Musica, explains a set of six rhythmic modes that were in use at the time, although it is not clear how they were formed. These rhythmic modes were all in triple time and rather limited the rhythm in chant to six different repeating patterns. This was a flaw seen by German music theorist Franco of Cologne and summarised as part of his treatise Ars Cantus Mensurabilis (the art of measured chant, or mensural notation). He suggested that individual notes could have their own rhythms represented by the shape of the note. Not until the 14th century did something like the present system of fixed note lengths arise. The use of regular measures (bars) became commonplace by the end of the 17th century.

The founder of what is now considered the standard music staff was Guido d'Arezzo, an Italian Benedictine monk who lived from about 991 until after 1033. He taught the use of solmization syllables based on a hymn to Saint John the Baptist, which begins Ut queant laxis and was written by the Lombard historian Paul the Deacon. The first stanza is:

1. Ut queant laxis
2. resonare fibris
3. Mira gestorum
4. famuli tuorum,
5. Solve polluti
6. labii reatum,
7. Sancte Iohannes.

Guido used the first syllable of each line, Ut, Re, Mi, Fa, Sol, La, and Si, to read notated music in terms of hexachords; they were not note names, and each could, depending on context, be applied to any note. In the 17th century, Ut was changed in most countries except France to the easily singable, open syllable Do, believed to have been taken either from the name of the Italian theorist Giovanni Battista Doni, or from the Latin word Dominus, meaning Lord.

Christian monks developed the first forms of modern European musical notation in order to standardize liturgy throughout the worldwide Church, and an enormous body of religious music has been composed for it through the ages. This led directly to the emergence and development of European classical music, and its many derivatives. The Baroque style, which encompassed music, art, and architecture, was particularly encouraged by the post-Reformation Catholic Church as such forms offered a means of religious expression that was stirring and emotional, intended to stimulate religious fervor.

== Modern staff notation ==
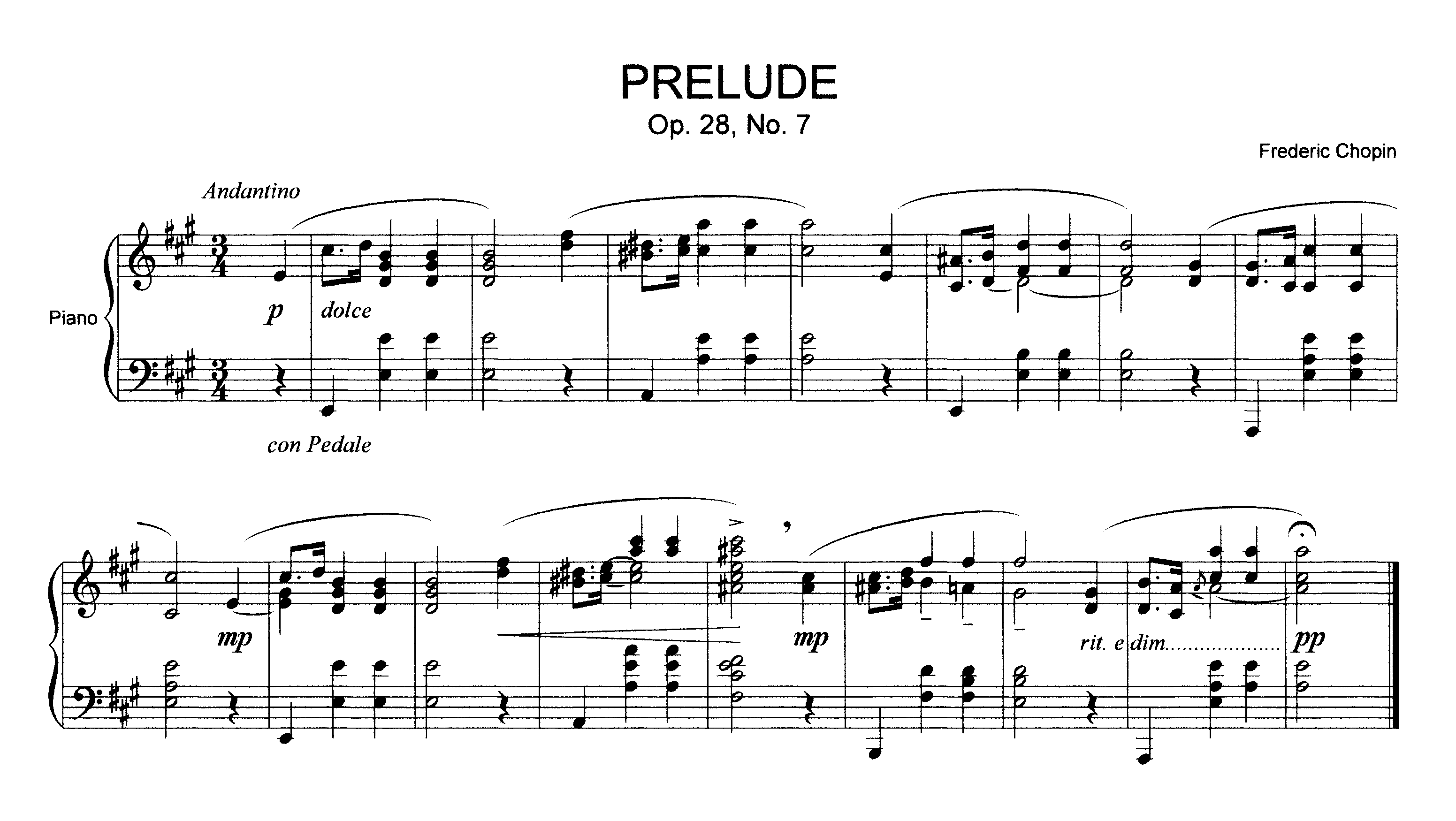
An example of modern musical notation: Prelude, Op. 28, No. 7, by Frédéric Chopin

Modern music notation is used by musicians of many different genres throughout the world. The staff (or stave, in British English) consists of 5 parallel horizontal lines that act as a framework upon which pitches are indicated by placing oval note-heads on (i.e. crossing) the staff lines, between the lines (i.e. in the spaces) or above and below the staff using small additional lines called ledger lines. Notation is read from left to right, which makes setting music for right-to-left scripts difficult. The pitch of a note is indicated by the vertical position of the note-head within the staff, and can be modified by accidentals. The duration (note length or note value) is indicated by the form of the note-head or with the addition of a note-stem plus beams or flags. A stemless hollow oval is a whole note or semibreve, a hollow rectangle or stemless hollow oval with one or two vertical lines on both sides is a double whole note or breve. A stemmed hollow oval is a half note or minim. Solid ovals always use stems, and can indicate quarter notes (crotchets) or, with added beams or flags, smaller subdivisions. Additional symbols such as dots and ties can lengthen the duration of a note.

A staff of written music generally begins with a clef, which indicates the pitch-range of the staff. The treble clef or G clef was originally a letter G and it identifies the second line up on the five-line staff as the note G above middle C. The bass clef or F clef identifies the second line down as the note F below middle C. While the treble and bass clef are the most widely used, other clefs, which identify middle C, are used for some instruments, such as the alto clef (for viola and alto trombone) and the tenor clef (used for some cello, bassoon, tenor trombone, and double bass music). Some instruments use mainly one clef, such as violin and flute which use treble clef, and double bass and tuba which use bass clef. Some instruments, such as piano and pipe organ, regularly use both treble and bass clefs.

Following the clef, the key signature is a group of 0 to 7 sharp (♯) or flat (♭) signs placed on the staff to indicate the key of the piece or song by specifying that certain notes are sharp or flat throughout the piece, unless otherwise indicated with accidentals added before certain notes. When a flat (♭) sign is placed before a note, the pitch of the note is lowered by one semitone. Similarly, a sharp sign (♯) raises the pitch by one semitone. For example, a sharp on the note D would raise it to D♯ while a flat would lower it to D♭. Double sharps and double flats are less common, but they are used. A double sharp is placed before a note to make it two semitones higher, a double flat makes it two semitones lower. A natural sign placed before a note renders that note in its "natural" form, which means that any sharp or flat applied to that note from the key signature or an accidental is cancelled. Sometimes a courtesy accidental is used in music where it is not technically required, to remind the musician of what pitch is required.

Following the key signature is the time signature. The time signature typically consists of two numbers, with one of the most common being 4/4. The top "4" indicates that there are four beats per measure (also called bar). The bottom "4" indicates that each of those beats are quarter notes. Measures divide the piece into groups of beats, and the time signatures specify those groupings. 4/4 is used so often that it is also called "common time", and it may be indicated with rather than numbers. Other frequently used time signatures are 3/4 (three beats per bar, with each beat being a quarter note); 2/4 (two beats per bar, with each beat being a quarter note); 6/8 (six beats per bar, with each beat being an eighth note) and 12/8 (twelve beats per bar, with each beat being an eighth note; in practice, the eighth notes are typically put into four groups of three eighth notes. 12/8 is a compound time type of time signature). Many other time signatures exist, such as 2/2 or 3/8.

Many short classical music pieces from the Classical era and songs from traditional music and popular music are in one time signature for much or all of the piece. Music from the Romantic era and later, particularly contemporary classical music and rock music genres such as progressive rock and the hardcore punk subgenre mathcore, may use mixed meter; songs or pieces change from one meter to another, for example alternating between bars of 5/4 and 7/8.

Directions to the player regarding matters such as tempo (e.g., andante) and dynamics (e.g., forte) appear above or below the staff. Terms indicating the musical expression or "feel" of a song or piece are indicated at the beginning of the piece and at any points where the mood changes (e.g., gelassen)

For vocal music, lyrics are written near the pitches of the melody. Since standard musical notation runs from left to right, when the lyrics are in a language that is written from right to left, such Arabic or Hebrew, the general flow of the text is from left to right, but each syllable is written from right to left. There were also attempts to write scores in such languages fully from right to left, for example by the Abraham Zevi Idelsohn, who published Hebrew songbooks and by the American Quaker educator Rolla Foley, who published a collection of Arabic songs.

For short pauses (breaths), retakes (retakes are indicated with a ' mark) are added.

In music for ensembles, a "score" shows music for all players together, with the staves for the different instruments and/or voices stacked vertically. The conductor uses the score while leading an orchestra, concert band, choir or other large ensemble. Individual performers in an ensemble play from "parts" which contain only the music played by an individual musician. A score can be constructed from a complete set of parts and vice versa. The process was laborious and time consuming when parts were hand-copied from the score, but since the development of scorewriter computer software in the 1980s, a score stored electronically can have parts automatically prepared by the program and printed out quickly and inexpensively using a computer printer.

=== Variations on staff notation ===
A lead sheet

A chord chart.

- Percussion notation conventions are varied because of the wide range of percussion instruments. Percussion instruments are generally grouped into two categories: pitched (e.g. glockenspiel or tubular bells) and non-pitched (e.g. bass drum and snare drum). The notation of non-pitched percussion instruments is less standardized. Pitched instruments use standard Western classical notation for the pitches and rhythms. In general, notation for unpitched percussion uses the five line staff, with different lines and spaces representing different drum kit instruments. Standard Western rhythmic notation is used to indicate the rhythm.
- Figured bass notation originated in Baroque basso continuo parts. It is also used extensively in accordion notation. The bass notes of the music are conventionally notated, along with numbers and other signs that determine which chords the harpsichordist, organist or lutenist should improvise. It does not, however, specify the exact pitches of the harmony, leaving that for the performer to improvise.
- A lead sheet specifies only the melody, lyrics and harmony, using one staff with chord symbols placed above and lyrics below. It is used to capture the essential elements of a popular song without specifying how the song should be arranged or performed.
- A chord chart or "chart" contains little or no melodic or voice-leading information at all, but provides basic harmonic information about the chord progression. Some chord charts also contain rhythmic information, indicated using slash notation for full beats and rhythmic notation for rhythms. This is the most common kind of written music used by professional session musicians playing jazz or other forms of popular music and is intended primarily for the rhythm section (usually containing piano, guitar, bass and drums).
- Simpler chord charts for songs may contain only the chord changes, placed above the lyrics where they occur. Such charts depend on prior knowledge of the melody, and are used as reminders in performance or informal group singing. Some chord charts intended for rhythm section accompanists contain only the chord progression.
- The shape note system is found in some church hymnals, sheet music, and song books, especially in the Southern United States. Instead of the customary elliptical note head, note heads of various shapes are used to show the position of the note on the major scale. The Sacred Harp is one of the most popular tune books using shape notes.

== In various countries ==
=== Korea ===
Jeongganbo musical notation system

Jeongganbo is a traditional musical notation system created during the time of Sejong the Great. It was the first East Asian system to represent rhythm, pitch, and time. Among various kinds of Korean traditional music, Jeong-gan-bo targets a particular genre, Jeong-ak (정악, 正樂).

Jeong-gan-bo specifies the pitch by writing the note's name down in a box called jeong-gan. One jeong-gan is one beat each, and it can be split into two, three or more to hold half beats, quarter beats, and more.

Also, there are many markings indicating things such as ornaments. Most of these were later created by Ki-su Kim.

=== India ===
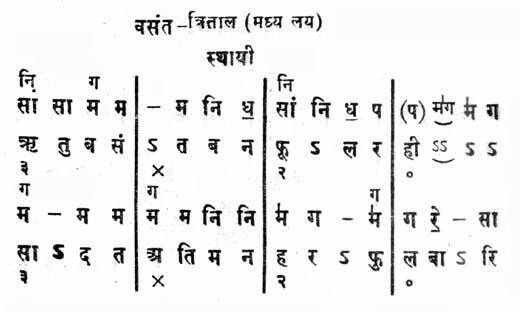
Indian music, early 20th century.

The Samaveda text (1200 BCE – 1000 BCE) contains what are probably the world's oldest surviving melodies. The musical notation is written usually immediately above, sometimes within, the line of Samaveda text, either in syllabic or numerical form depending on the Samavedic Sakha (school). The Indian scholar and musical theorist Pingala (c. 200 BCE), in his Chanda Sutra, used marks denoting long and short syllables to indicate meters in Sanskrit poetry.

A rock inscription circa 7th–8th century CE at Kudumiyanmalai, Tamil Nadu contains an early example of a musical notation. It was first identified and published by archaeologist/epigraphist D. R. Bhandarkar. Written in the Pallava-grantha script of the 7th century, it contains 38 horizontal lines of notation inscribed on a rectangular rock face (dimensions of around 13 by 14 feet). Each line of the notation contains 64 characters (characters representing musical notes), written in groups of four notes. The basic characters for the seven notes, sa, ri, ga, ma, pa, dha, ni, are seen to be suffixed with the vowels a, i, u, e. For example, in the place of sa, any one of sa, si, su or se is used. Similarly, in place of ri, any one of ra, ri, ru or re is used. Horizontal lines divide the notation into 7 sections. Each section contains 4 to 7 lines of notation, with a title indicating its musical 'mode'. These modes may have been popular from at least the 6th century CE and were incorporated into the Indian raga system that developed later. But some of the unusual features seen in this notation have been given several non-conclusive interpretations by scholars.

In the notation of Indian rāga, a solfege-like system called sargam is used. As in Western solfege, there are names for the seven basic pitches of a major scale (Shadja, Rishabha, Gandhara, Madhyama, Panchama, Dhaivata and Nishada, usually shortened to Sa, Re, Ga, Ma, Pa, Dha, Ni). The tonic of any scale is named Sa, and the dominant Pa. Sa is fixed in any scale, and Pa is fixed at a fifth above it (a Pythagorean fifth rather than an equal-tempered fifth). These two notes are known as achala swar ('fixed notes').

Each of the other five notes, Re, Ga, Ma, Dha and Ni, can take a 'regular' (shuddha) pitch, which is equivalent to its pitch in a standard major scale (thus, shuddha Re, the second degree of the scale, is a whole-step higher than Sa), or an altered pitch, either a half-step above or half-step below the shuddha pitch. Re, Ga, Dha and Ni all have altered partners that are a half-step lower (komal or "flat") (thus, komal Re is a half-step higher than Sa).

Ma has an altered partner that is a half-step higher (teevra or "sharp") (thus, teevra Ma is an augmented fourth above Sa). Re, Ga, Ma, Dha and Ni are called vikrut swar ('movable notes'). In the written system of Indian notation devised by Ravi Shankar, the pitches are represented by Western letters. Capital letters are used for the achala swar, and for the higher variety of all the vikrut swar. Lowercase letters are used for the lower variety of the vikrut swar.

Other systems exist for non-twelve-tone equal temperament and non-Western music, such as the Indian Swaralipi.

=== Russia ===
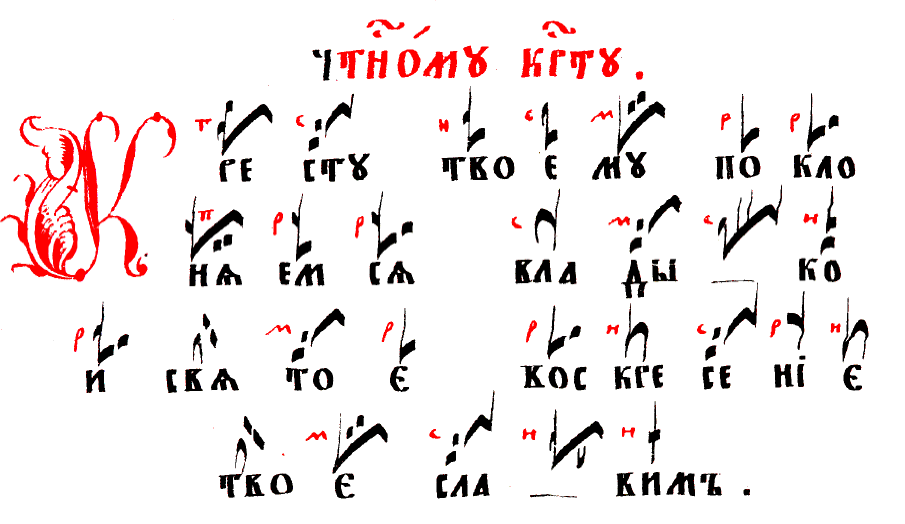
An example of Znamenny notation with so-called "red marks", Russia, 1884. "Thy Cross we honour, oh Lord, and Thy holy Resurrection we praise."

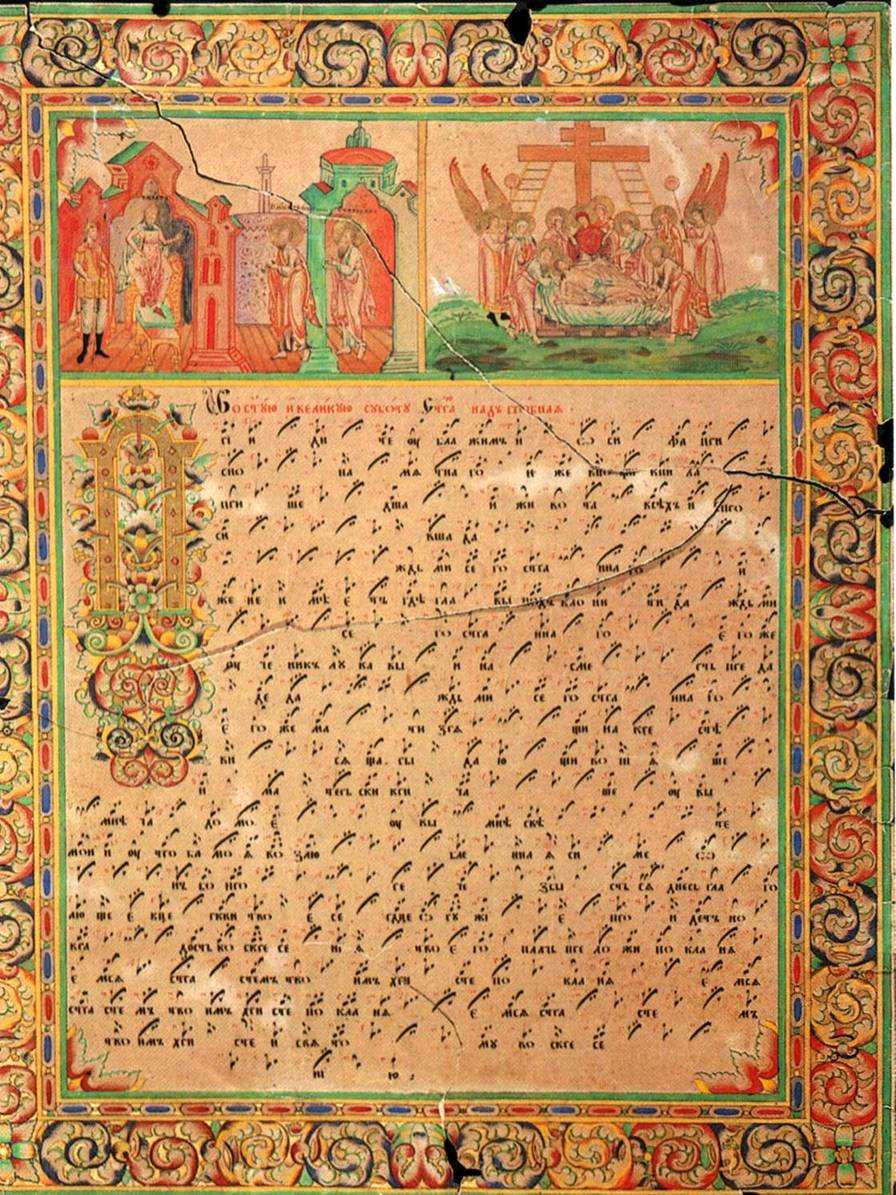
Hand-drawn lubok featuring 'hook and banner notation'

Znamenny Chant is a singing tradition used in the Russian Orthodox Church which uses a "hook and banner" notation. Znamenny Chant is unison, melismatic liturgical singing that has its own specific notation, called the stolp notation. The symbols used in the stolp notation are called kryuki (Russian: крюки, 'hooks') or znamyona (Russian: знамёна, 'banners'). Often the names of the signs are used to refer to the stolp notation. Znamenny melodies are part of a system, consisting of Eight Modes (intonation structures; called glasy); the melodies are characterized by fluency and well-balancedness. There exist several types of Znamenny Chant: the so-called Stolpovoy, Malyj (Little) and Bolshoy (Great) Znamenny Chant. Ruthenian Chant (Prostopinije) is sometimes considered a sub-division of the Znamenny Chant tradition, with the Muscovite Chant (Znamenny Chant proper) being the second branch of the same musical continuum.

Znamenny Chants are not written with notes (the so-called linear notation), but with special signs, called Znamëna (Russian for "marks", "banners") or Kryuki ("hooks"), as some shapes of these signs resemble hooks. Each sign may include the following components: a large black hook or a black stroke, several smaller black 'points' and 'commas' and lines near the hook or crossing the hook. Some signs may mean only one note, some 2 to 4 notes, and some a whole melody of more than 10 notes with a complicated rhythmic structure. The stolp notation was developed in Kievan Rus' as an East Slavic refinement of the Byzantine neumatic musical notation.

The most notable feature of this notation system is that it records transitions of the melody, rather than notes. The signs also represent the mood and indicate how this part of melody is to be sung (tempo, strength, devotion, meekness, etc.). Every sign has its own name and also features as a spiritual symbol. For example, there is a specific sign, called "little dove" (Russian: голубчик (golubchik)), which represents two rising sounds, but which is also a symbol of the Holy Ghost. Gradually, the system became more and more complicated. This system was also ambiguous, so that almost no one, except the most trained and educated singers, could sing an unknown melody at sight. The signs only helped to reproduce the melody, not coding it in an unambiguous way. (See Byzantine Empire)

=== China ===
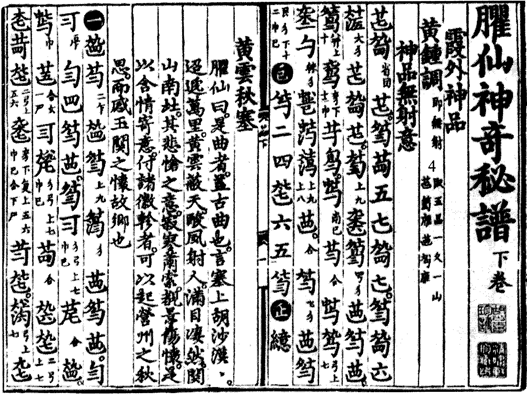
Chinese Guqin notation, 1425

The earliest known examples of text referring to music in China are inscriptions on musical instruments found in the Tomb of the Marquis Yi of Zeng (d. 433 BCE). Sets of 41 chimestones and 65 bells bore lengthy inscriptions concerning pitches, scales, and transposition. The bells still sound the pitches that their inscriptions refer to. Although no notated musical compositions were found, the inscriptions indicate that the system was sufficiently advanced to allow for musical notation. Two systems of pitch nomenclature existed, one for relative pitch and one for absolute pitch. For relative pitch, a solmization system was used.

Gongche notation used Chinese characters for the names of the scale.

=== Japan ===
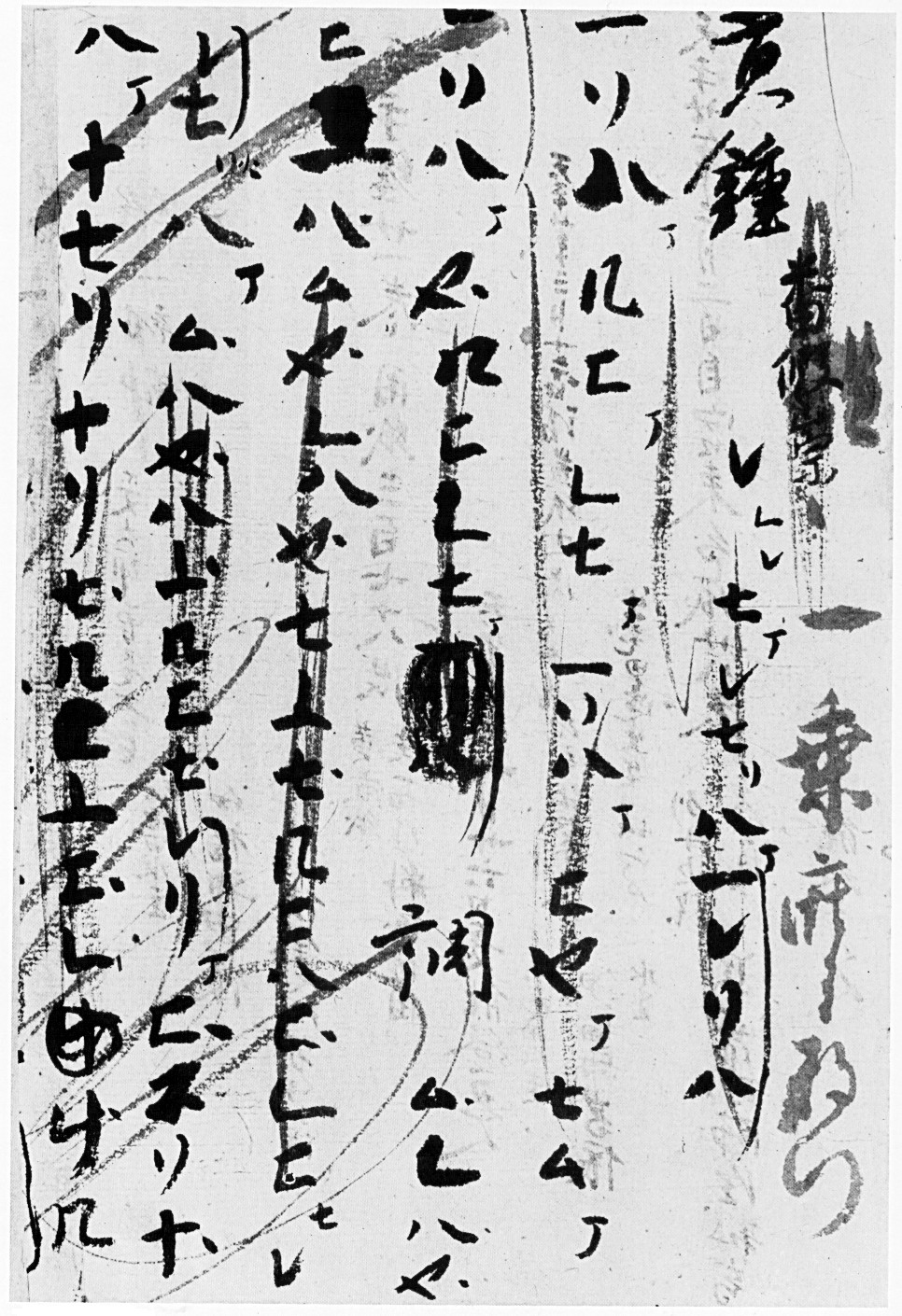
Tempyō Biwa Fu 天平琵琶譜 (circa 738 AD), musical notation for Biwa. (Shōsōin, at Nara, Japan)

Japanese music is highly diversified, and therefore requires various systems of notation. In Japanese shakuhachi music, for example, glissandos and timbres are often more significant than distinct pitches, whereas taiko notation focuses on discrete strokes.

Ryukyuan sanshin music uses kunkunshi, a notation system of kanji with each character corresponding to a finger position on a particular string.

=== Indonesia ===
Notation plays a relatively minor role in the oral traditions of Indonesia. However, in Java and Bali, several systems were developed starting in the late 19th century, initially for archival purposes. Today the most widespread are cipher notations ("not angka" in the broadest sense) in which the pitches are represented with the numbers 1 to 7, with 1 corresponding to either the highest note of a particular octave, as in Sundanese gamelan, or the lowest, as in the kepatihan notation of Javanese gamelan.

Notes in the ranges outside the central octave are represented with one or more dots above or below each number. For the most part, these cipher notations are mainly used to notate the skeletal melody (the balungan) and vocal parts (gerongan), although transcriptions of the elaborative instrument variations are sometimes used for analysis and teaching. Drum parts are notated with a system of symbols largely based on letters representing the vocables used to learn and remember drumming patterns; these symbols are typically laid out in a grid underneath the skeletal melody for a specific or generic piece.

The symbols used for drum notation (as well as the vocables represented) are highly variable from place to place and performer to performer. In addition to these current systems, two older notations used a kind of staff: the Solonese script could capture the flexible rhythms of the pesinden with a squiggle on a horizontal staff, while in Yogyakarta, a ladder-like vertical staff allowed notation of the balungan by dots and also included important drum strokes. In Bali, there are a few books published of Gamelan gender wayang pieces employing alphabetical notation in the old Balinese script.

Composers and scholars both Indonesian and foreign have also mapped the slendro and pelog tuning systems of gamelan onto the Western staff, with and without various symbols for microtones. The Dutch composer Ton de Leeuw also invented a three-line staff for his composition Gending. However, these systems do not enjoy widespread use.

In the second half of the twentieth century, Indonesian musicians and scholars extended cipher notation to other oral traditions, and a diatonic scale cipher notation has become common for notating Western-related genres (church hymns, popular songs, and so forth). Unlike the cipher notation for gamelan music, which uses a "fixed-Do" (that is, 1 always corresponds to the same pitch, within the natural variability of gamelan tuning), Indonesian diatonic cipher notation is "movable-Do" notation, so scores must indicate which pitch corresponds to the number 1 (for example, "1=C").

A short melody in slendro notated using the Surakarta method.

The same notated using the Yogyakarta method or 'chequered notation'.

The same notated using Kepatihan notation.

The same approximated using Western notation.

=== Jewish traditions ===
Example of biblical Hebrew Trope

Ancient Jewish texts include a series of marks assigning musical cantillation notes. Known in Hebrew as Ta'amim and Yiddish as Trope, there are records of these marks from the 6th and 7th centuries, having been passed down as a tradition for Jewish prayers and texts. Traditionally a series of marks written above and around the accompanying Hebrew texts, Ta’amim marks represent a short musical motif. Ta’amim tells the reader how to sing or chant the words aloud. It acts as a guide for the sentence structure, showing which words connect and where pauses go, and they mark which syllable gets the emphasis. Throughout the Jewish diaspora there are variations in the accompanying melodies.

== Other systems and practices ==
=== Cipher notation ===
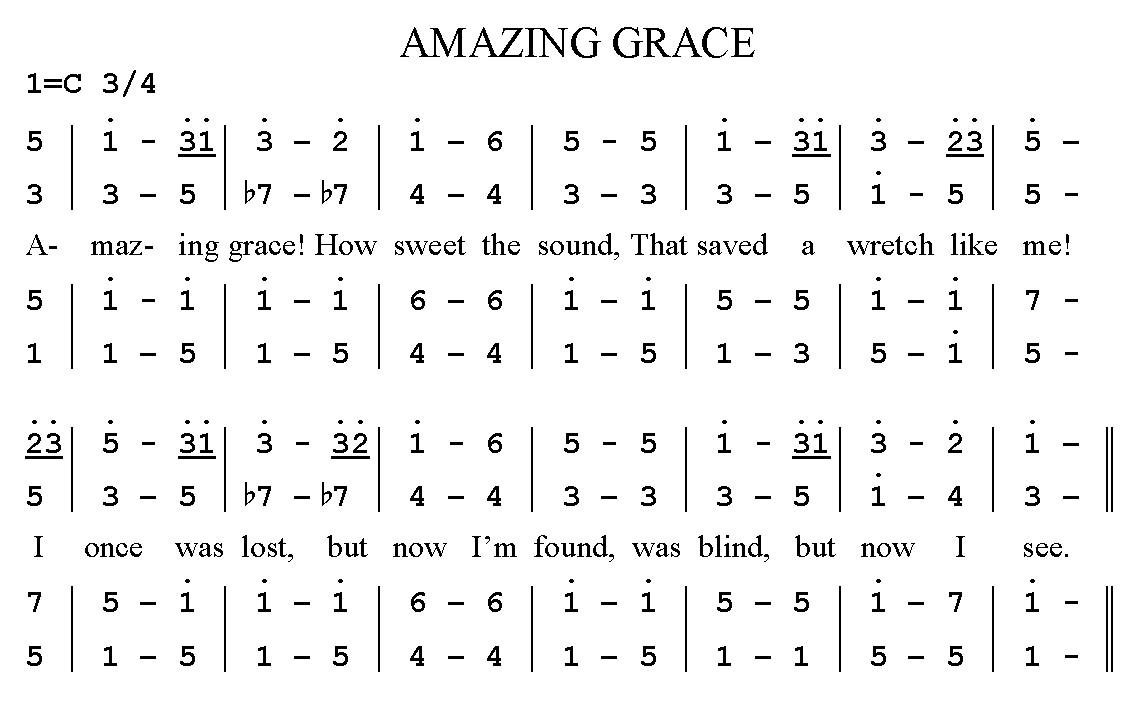
"Amazing Grace" in numbered notation.

Cipher notation systems assigning Arabic numerals to the major scale degrees have been used at least since the Iberian organ tablatures of the 16th-century and include such exotic adaptations as Siffernotskrift. The one most widely in use today is the Chinese Jianpu, discussed in the main article. Numerals can also be assigned to different scale systems, as in the Javanese kepatihan notation described above.

=== Solfège ===
Solfège is a way of assigning syllables to names of the musical scale. In order, they are today: Do, Re, Mi, Fa, Sol, La, Ti, Do' (for the octave). The classic variation is: Do, Re, Mi, Fa, Sol, La, Si, Do'. The first Western system of functional names for the musical notes was introduced by Guido of Arezzo (c. 991 – after 1033), using the beginning syllables of the first six musical lines of the Latin hymn Ut queant laxis. The original sequence was Ut, Re, Mi, Fa, Sol, La, where each verse started a scale note higher. "Ut" later became "Do". The equivalent syllables used in Indian music are: Sa, Re, Ga, Ma, Pa, Dha, Ni. See also: solfège, sargam, Kodály hand signs.

Tonic sol-fa is a type of notation using the initial letters of solfège.

=== Letter notation ===
The notes of the 12-tone scale can be written by their letter names A–G, possibly with a trailing accidental, such as A♯ or B♭.

==== ABC ====
ABC notation is a compact format using plain text characters, readable by computers and by humans. More than 100,000 tunes are now transcribed in this format.

=== Tablature ===
Tablature was first used in the Middle Ages for organ music and later in the Renaissance for lute music. In most lute tablatures, a staff is used, but instead of pitch values, the lines of the staff represent the strings of the instrument. The frets to finger are written on each line, indicated by letters or numbers. Rhythm is written separately with one or another variation of standard note values indicating the duration of the fastest moving part. Few seem to have remarked on the fact that tablature combines in one notation system both the physical and technical requirements of play (the lines and symbols on them and in relation to each other representing the actual performance actions) with the unfolding of the music itself (the lines of tablature taken horizontally represent the actual temporal unfolding of the music). In later periods, lute and guitar music was written with standard notation. Tablature caught interest again in the late 20th century for popular guitar music and other fretted instruments, being easy to transcribe and share over the internet in ASCII format.

=== Piano-roll-based notations ===
Some chromatic systems have been created taking advantage of the layout of black and white keys of the standard piano keyboard. The "staff" is most widely referred to as "piano roll", created by extending the black and white piano keys.

==== Klavar notation ====
Klavarskribo (sometimes shortened to klavar) is a music notation system that was introduced in 1931 by the Cornelis Pot. The name means "keyboard writing" in Esperanto. It differs from conventional music notation in a number of ways and is intended to be easily readable. Many klavar readers are from the Netherlands.

=== Chromatic staff notations ===
Over the past three centuries, hundreds of music notation systems have been proposed as alternatives to traditional Western music notation. Many of these systems seek to improve upon traditional notation by using a "chromatic staff" in which each of the 12 pitch classes has its own unique place on the staff. An example is Jacques-Daniel Rochat's Dodeka music notation. These notation systems do not require the use of standard key signatures, accidentals, or clef signs. They also represent interval relationships more consistently and accurately than traditional notation, e.g. major 3rds appear wider than minor 3rds. Many of these systems are described and illustrated in Gardner Read's Source Book of Proposed Music Notation Reforms.

=== Graphic notation ===
The term "graphic notation" refers to the contemporary use of non-traditional symbols and text to convey information about the performance of a piece of music. Composers such as Johanna Beyer, Christian Wolff, Carmen Barradas, Earle Brown, Yoko Ono, Anthony Braxton, John Cage, Morton Feldman, Cathy Berberian, Graciela Castillo, Krzysztof Penderecki, Cornelius Cardew, Pauline Oliveros and Roger Reynolds are among the early generation of composers who innovated forms of graphic notation beginning in the mid-twentieth century. The book Notations, edited by John Cage and Alison Knowles and published by Something Else Press in 1969, compiles many examples of this kind of notation.

=== Simplified music notation ===
Simplified music notation is an alternative form of musical notation designed to make sight-reading easier. It is based on classical staff notation, but incorporates sharps and flats into the shape of the note heads. Notes such as double sharps and double flats are written at the pitch they are actually played at, but preceded by symbols called "history signs" that show they have been transposed.

=== Modified Stave Notation ===
Modified Stave Notation (MSN) is an alternative way of notating music for people who cannot easily read ordinary musical notation even if it is enlarged.

=== Parsons code ===
Parsons code is used to encode music so that it can be easily searched.

=== Braille music ===
Braille music is a complete, well developed, and internationally accepted musical notation system that has symbols and notational conventions quite independent of print music notation. It is linear in nature, similar to a printed language and different from the two-dimensional nature of standard printed music notation. To a degree, Braille music resembles musical markup languages such as MusicXML or NIFF.

=== Integer notation ===
In integer notation, or the integer model of pitch, all pitch classes and intervals between pitch classes are designated using the numbers 0 through 11.

=== Rap notation ===
The standard form of rap notation is the "flow diagram", where rappers line up their lyrics underneath "beat numbers". Hip-hop scholars also make use of the same flow diagrams that rappers use: the books How to Rap and How to Rap 2 extensively use the diagrams to explain rap's triplets, flams, rests, rhyme schemes, runs of rhyme, and breaking rhyme patterns, among other techniques. Similar systems are used by musicologists Adam Krims in his book Rap Music and the Poetics of Identity and Kyle Adams in his work on rap's flow. As rap usually revolves around a strong 4/4 beat, with certain syllables aligned to the beat, all the notational systems have a similar structure: they all have four beat numbers at the top of the diagram, so that syllables can be written in-line with the beat.

=== Tin Whistle Fingering Charts ===
It is used for six-hole woodwind instruments, which are common in Irish folk music. Tin whistle tabs are particularly useful for those unfamiliar with sheet music notation.

== Music notation on computers ==
=== Unicode ===
The Musical Symbols Unicode block encodes an extensive system of formal musical notation.

The Miscellaneous Symbols block has a few of the more common symbols:

- U+2669 ♩ QUARTER NOTE
- U+266A ♪ EIGHTH NOTE
- U+266B ♫ BEAMED EIGHTH NOTES
- U+266C ♬ BEAMED SIXTEENTH NOTES
- U+266D ♭ MUSIC FLAT SIGN
- U+266E ♮ MUSIC NATURAL SIGN
- U+266F ♯ MUSIC SHARP SIGN

The Miscellaneous Symbols and Pictographs block has three emoji that may include depictions of musical notes:

- U+1F3A7 🎧 HEADPHONE
- U+1F3B5 🎵 MUSICAL NOTE
- U+1F3B6 🎶 MULTIPLE MUSICAL NOTES

=== Software ===
Various computer programs have been developed for creating music notation (called "scorewriters" or "music notation software"). Music may also be stored in various digital file formats for purposes other than graphic notation output.

== Perspectives of musical notation in composition and musical performance ==
According to Philip Tagg and Richard Middleton, musicology and to a degree European-influenced musical practice suffer from a "notational centricity", a methodology slanted by the characteristics of notation. A variety of 20th- and 21st-century composers have dealt with this problem, either by adapting standard Western musical notation or by using graphic notation. These include George Crumb, Luciano Berio, Krzysztof Penderecki, Earl Brown, John Cage, Witold Lutoslawski, and others.

== See also ==
- List of musical symbols of modern notation
- Hebrew cantillation
- Helmholtz pitch notation
- Colored music notation
- Eye movement in music reading
- Guido of Arezzo, inventor of modern musical notation
- History of music publishing
- List of scorewriters
- Mensural notation
- Modal notation
- Music engraving, drawing music notation for the purpose of mechanical reproduction
- Music OCR, the application of optical character recognition to interpret sheet music
- Neume (plainchant notation)
- Pitch class
- Rastrum, a five-pointed writing implement used to draw parallel staff lines across a blank piece of sheet music
- Scorewriter
- Semasiography
- Sight-reading
- Sheet music
- Time unit box system, a notation system useful for polyrhythms
- Tongan music notation, a subset of standard music notation
- Tonnetz
- Znamenny chant
