= Simplified music notation =

Alternative form of music notation

Simplified music notation is an alternative form of music notation designed to make sight-reading easier. It was proposed by Peter Hayes George (1927–2012). It is based on classical staff notation, but sharps and flats are incorporated into the shape of the note heads. Notes such as double sharps and double flats are written at the pitch at which they are actually played, but preceded by symbols called "history signs" to show that they have been transposed. The key signature and all other information in the original score is retained, but the player does not need to remember the key signature and accidentals while playing.

The notation was designed to help players who struggle with sight-reading, including those who suffer from working memory impairments, dyslexia and other learning difficulties.

== History ==
Peter Hayes George (1927–2012) was born in Quebec, Canada, the son of a diplomat. He attended RADA and began his career as an actor playing roles such as the lead in Malachi's Cove directed by Charles Frank and the juvenile lead in Peter Brook's London West End production Dark of the Moon. In the 1960s he gave up acting as shortcomings with his working memory made it difficult for him to accept major roles with long speeches.

After studying music for teachers at Los Angeles City College in 1962, George took up the piano. He thought that since musicians can keep the music in front of them while playing, his memory problems would present no difficulty. However, he discovered that musicians must remember to modulate each musical note according to the key signature, to continue any accidentals through the bar, and to cancel them at the end of the bar. He also found difficulty in transposing notes such as double sharps and double flats.

His simplified music notation was designed in response to this. The original concept was formed in 1977 and the notation was developed over the next 30 years. The first series of music books in his simplified music notation was published in September 2008. A second series, Key Perfect, was published in 2010. Its early-grade piano repertoire pieces were composed and compiled by music teacher and author John Kember and international pianist and lecturer John York. This latest series was designed to show the effectiveness of simplified music notation as a learning tool towards improving students' reading skills in traditional notation.

== Notation ==
The basic concept of George's simplified music notation is that players should be able to play what they see, without having to adapt for key signature or complex accidentals.

The traditional sharp and flat symbols in the key signature are replaced by the sharp and flat noteheads of simplified music notation: a triangle for sharps and a rhombus for flats. The traditional oval notehead is used when a note is natural.

If there is a key change in the middle of a piece, the new key signature is shown without naturals to 'neutralise' the previous key. The exception to this is where the key changes to C major or A minor, where 'neutralising' naturals are used to make this clear. Instead of the traditional natural symbol, an oval notehead is used.

Double sharps, and double flats (and optionally B♯ and E♯, and F♭ and C♭) are enharmonically transposed, and preceded by a symbol called a history sign. History signs allow anybody studying the music to see how it was originally written and to analyse the harmonic progression of the piece. However, they can be ignored whilst sight-reading.
