= Inflection (disambiguation) =

Inflection (or inflexion), is the modification of a word to express grammatical information.

Inflection or inflexion may also refer to:

- Inflection point, a point at which a curve changes from being concave to convex, or vice versa
- Chromatic inflection, alteration of a musical note that makes it chromatic
- Accidental (music), a note that is not a member of the scale indicated by the key signature
- A change in tone of voice
