= Musica ficta =

Renaissance European music theory term to describe pitches

Musica ficta (from Latin, "false", "feigned", or "fictitious" music) was a term used in European music theory from the late 12th century to about 1600 to describe pitches, whether notated or added at the time of performance, that lie outside the system of musica recta or musica vera ("correct" or "true" music) as defined by the hexachord system of Guido of Arezzo.

== Modern use ==
Today, the term is often loosely applied to all unnotated inflections (whether they are actually recta or ficta notes; see below) that must be inferred from the musical context and added either by an editor or by performers themselves. However, some of the words used in modern reference books to represent musica ficta, such as "inflection", "alteration", and "added accidentals" lie outside the way many Medieval and Renaissance theorists described the term.

== Historical sense and relation to hexachords ==
Throughout the period that incorporated musica ficta, singers sight read melodies through a series of interlocked hexachords that formed the backbone of the solmization system—a method that eventually became the modern system of tonic sol-fa. To sing notes outside the recta pitches of the gamut (the range generally available to composers and performers, i.e., from G at the bottom of the modern bass clef to E at the top of the treble clef), performers had to invoke "fictive" hexachords to sing pitches such as F♯ or E♭. Hexachords normally were formed only on C, F, and G, and the interval pattern within each of these hexachords was always tone-tone-semitone-tone-tone, which was sung as ut re mi fa sol la. Hence, if singers needed to sing the pitch F♯, they had to think of the half step between F♯ and G as the solmization syllables mi and fa, for mi-fa always represented the half step within a hexachord. When they did this, they invoked a nominal hexachord starting on the note D, and this hexachord was considered fictive because it contained a false or fictitious F♯ (that is, a pitch that did not belong to the recta notes of the gamut). Moreover, since the hexachord built on F naturally contained a B♭, music based on a scale involving the soft or F hexachord had the pitch B♭ as part of the recta notes of the scale.

However, in the 16th century, the signs used to represent these fictive notes (the signs for b mollis [♭] and b durum [♯]) came to acquire their modern meanings of raising or lowering notes by a half step. Adrian Le Roy wrote that "b sharpe doeth holde up the tune halfe a note higher, and b flatte, contrarywise doeth lette it fall halfe a note lower". But as early as 1524, theorists also had this understanding of these signs. Moreover, near the beginning of the 17th century, Michael Praetorius employed the words signa chromatica (chromatic signs) to refer to sharps and flats. Hence, musicians of the later Middle Ages and Renaissance did not all share a uniform interpretation of this concept.

== Practical application ==
The signs b mollis and b durum were not notated with any regularity in vocal sources of the late Middle Ages and Renaissance, and although the principles that singers used to supply the missing information were discussed in theoretical treatises, the explanations are far too cursory to enable modern musicians to reconstruct the old practices with any degree of accuracy. Tablatures, however, because they turn implicit solmization practices into explicit pitches, provide a precise view of how musicians, or at least those in the 16th century, added sharps and flats to vocal sources (the first tablatures were published in the early 16th century).

Common practices:

- Many musicians in earlier times found the linear (melodic) and vertical (harmonic) dissonance caused by clashes between mi and fa aurally offensive (especially when it involved tritones and octaves), and they regularly removed the dissonance. Exceptions to this practice were common, however, particularly at cadences; some musicians even found dissonant octaves acceptable at times.
- Despite the theoretical prohibition of what Gioseffo Zarlino referred to as occasions when "the parts of a composition do not have a harmonic relation between their voices" ("le parti della cantilena non habbiano tra loro relatione harmonica nelle loro voci"), 16th-century tablatures demonstrate that musicians sometimes removed and at other times retained these clashes.
- At cadences and other places where two voice parts proceed to an octave or unison, singers normally approached the perfect interval from the closest imperfect interval; when the closest imperfect interval did not occur naturally in the music, singers created it either by adding a sharp to the voice rising by a whole step or by adding a flat to the voice descending by a whole step.

These practices were common throughout Europe, but in Germany musicians followed a distinctive set of practices for their own vernacular music, particularly at cadences, where they regularly avoided approaching perfect intervals from the closest imperfect intervals.

== Modern editions ==
Today, editors usually show their recommendations for ficta in Medieval and Renaissance music by placing an accidental sign above the note in question. This indicates that these accidentals were not part of the original source. Editors place any signs found in a period document on the staff directly before the note the sign applies to—as they would an accidental placed by the composer of a modern work, and indeed as it appears in the original document.

== See also ==
- Hexachord
- Guidonian hand
- Solmization
- Accidental (music)
- Medieval music
- Renaissance music
