= Ut queant laxis =

Latin hymn in honour of John the Baptist

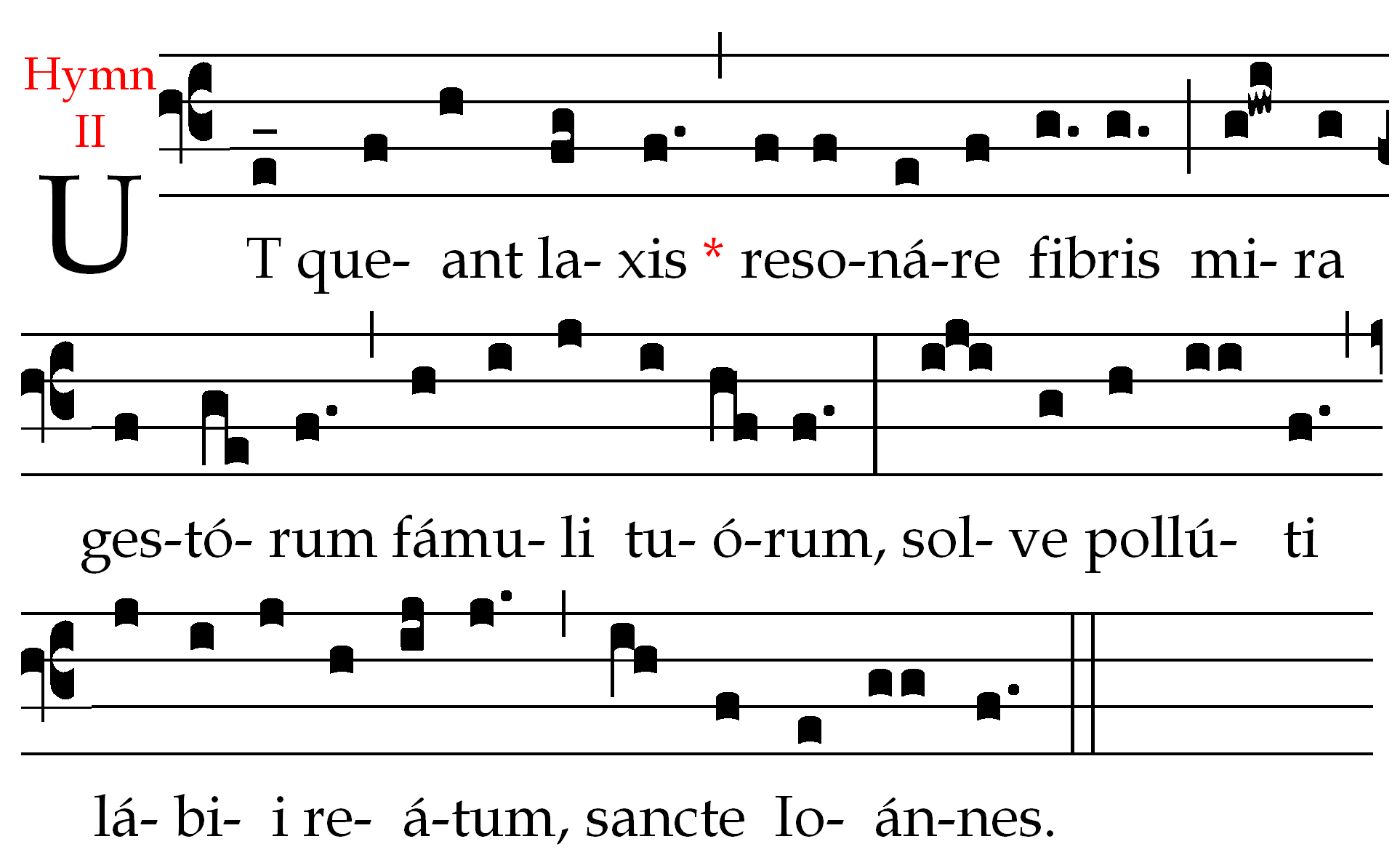
"Ut queant laxis" in neume notation

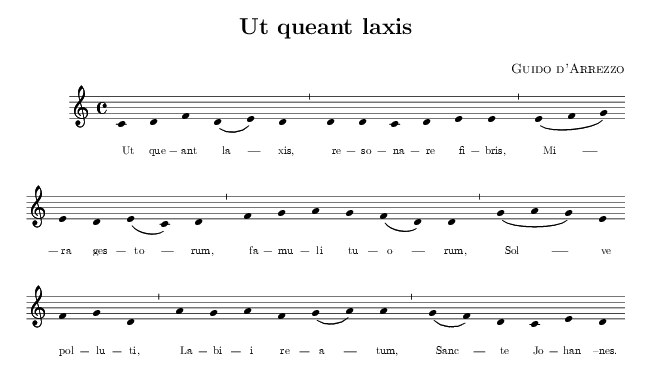
"Ut queant laxis" in modern notation

"Ut queant laxis" or "Hymnus in Ioannem" (English: "So that they may, with loosened [voices]" or "Hymn to John") is a Latin hymn in honor of John the Baptist, written in Horatian Sapphics with text traditionally attributed to Paulus Diaconus, the eighth-century Lombard historian. It is famous for its part in the history of musical notation, in particular solmization. The hymn belongs to the tradition of Gregorian chant.

It is not known who wrote the melody. Guido of Arezzo possibly composed it, but he more likely used an existing melody. A variant of the melody appears in an eleventh-century musical setting of Horace's poem Ode to Phyllis (4.11) recorded in a manuscript in France.

== Structure ==
The hymn uses classical metres: the Sapphic stanza consisting of three Sapphic hendecasyllables followed by an adonius (a type of dimeter).

The chant is useful for teaching singing because of the way it uses successive notes of the scale: the first six musical phrases of each stanza begin on a successively higher notes of the hexachord, giving ut–re–mi–fa–so–la; though ut is replaced by do in modern solfège. The naming of the notes of the hexachord by the first syllable of each hemistich (half line of verse) of the first verse is usually attributed to Guido of Arezzo. Guido, who was active in the eleventh century, is regarded as the father of modern musical notation. He made use of clefs (C & F clefs) and invented the ut-re-mi-fa-sol-la notation. The hymn does not help with the seventh tone as the last line, Sancte Iohannes, breaks the ascending pattern. The syllable si, for the seventh tone, was added in the 18th century.

The first stanza is:

Ut queant laxis
First verse of the hymn (Gregorian chant)

Ut queant laxīs
resonāre fibrīs
Mīra gestōrum
famulī tuōrum,
Solve pollūtī
labiī reātum,
Sāncte Iohannēs.

It may be translated: So that they may, with loosened voices, resound the wonders of your deeds, clean the guilt from our stained lips, O Saint John.

A paraphrase by Cecile Gertken, OSB (1902–2001) preserves the key syllables and loosely evokes the original meter:

Do let our voices
resonate most purely,
miracles telling,
far greater than many;
so let our tongues be
lavish in your praises,
Saint John the Baptist.

Ut is now mostly replaced by Do in solfège due to the latter's open sound, in deference to Italian theorist Giovanni Battista Doni. The word "Ut" is still in use to name the C-clef. The seventh note was not part of the medieval hexachord and does not occur in this melody, and it was originally called "si" from "Sancte Ioannes" (Johannes). In the nineteenth century, Sarah Glover, an English music teacher, renamed "si" to "ti" so that every syllable might be notated by its initial letter. But this was not adopted in countries using fixed do solfège: in Romance languages "si" is used alike for B and B flat, and no separate syllable is required for sharp "sol".

Melody

== Liturgical use ==
In the Roman Rite, the hymn is sung in the Divine Office on June 24, the Feast of the Nativity of John the Baptist. The full hymn is divided into three parts, with "Ut queant laxis" sung at Vespers, "Antra deserti" sung at Matins, "O nimis felix" sung at Lauds, and doxologies added after the first two parts.

== See also ==
- Diatonic and chromatic
- Do-Re-Mi (song). The lyrics teach the solfege syllables by linking them with English homophones (or near-homophones)
- Gamut
- Guidonian hand
- Solmization
