= Gesolreut =

Gesolreut (sometimes split into the parts G sol re ut) is a music term dating to the medieval period. It is the word used for the pitches g and g♯ within the hexachord system devised by Guido of Arezzo. It is the seventh compound name utilized in the Guidonian hand mnemonic device for sight-singing. In this method, the pitch g/g# is sung using either sol, re, or ut, depending on what hexachord is being used.
