= Giovanni Battista Doni =

Italian music theorist and classicist (1595–1647)

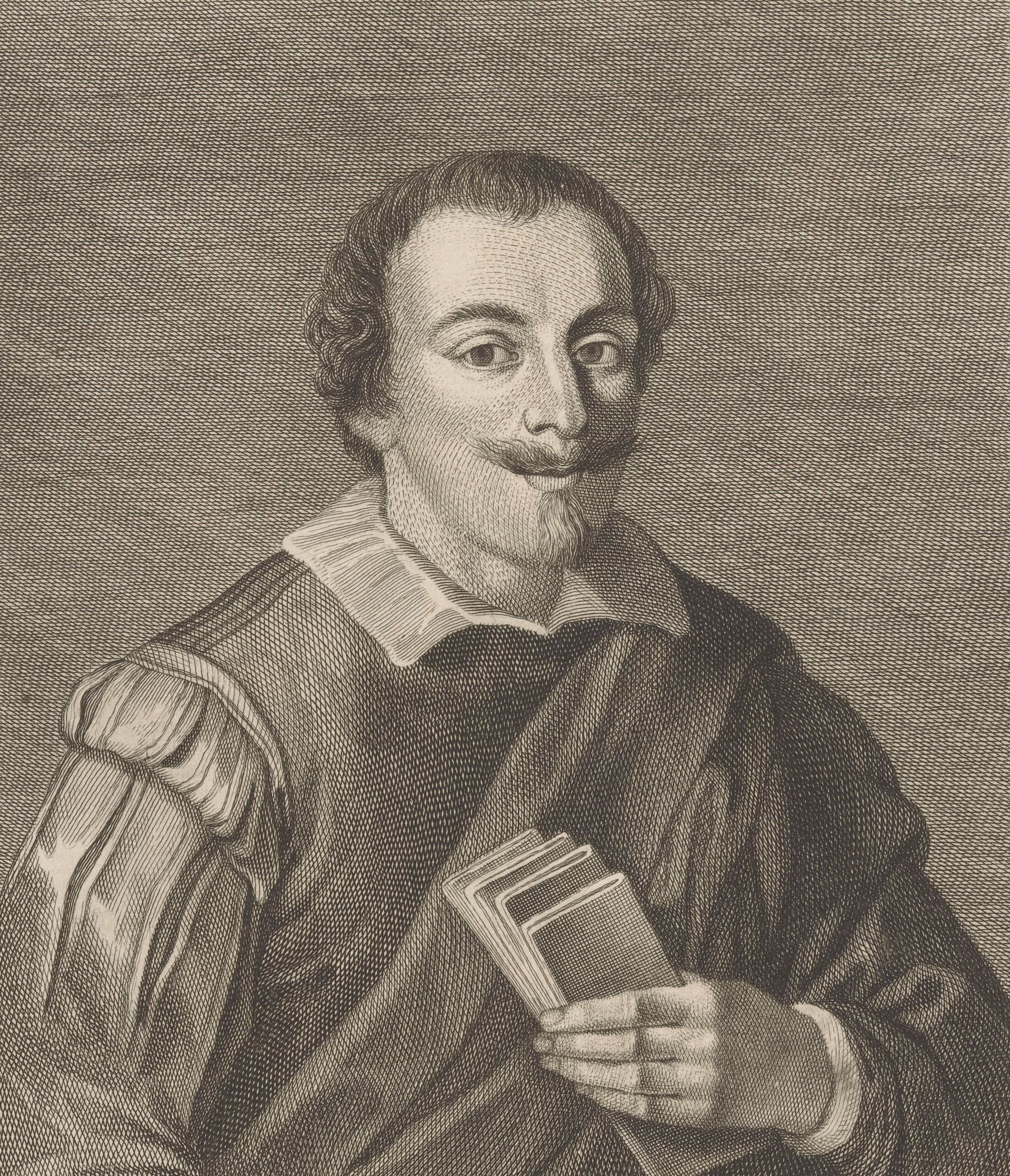
- Portrait, engraving by Gaetano Vascellini (1745-1805) after G. Irabattesi
- Born: Florence, Grand Duchy of Tuscany
- Baptised: 13 March 1595
- Died: December 1, 1647 (aged 52); Florence, Grand Duchy of Tuscany

Academic background
- Education: University of Florence; University of Bologna; University of Rome La Sapienza

Academic work
- Discipline: Ancient Greek music
- Institutions: University of Florence

Giovanni Battista Doni (bap. 13 March 1595 – 1 December 1647) was an Italian music theorist, classicist and philologist who made an extensive study of ancient Greek music. He is known, among other works, for having renamed the note "Ut" to "Do" in solfège.

In his day, he was a well-known lawyer, classical scholar, critic and musical theorist, and from 1640 to 1647 he occupied the Chair of Eloquence at the University of Florence and was a prominent member of the city's Accademia della Crusca, the premier academic philologic society of Florence and Italy at the time. They had published the first Italian-language dictionary and grammar in 1612.

== Life ==
Born in Florence, he studied Greek, rhetoric, poetry and philosophy at the Universities of Florence and Bologna and both mathematics and jurisprudence at the University of Rome. Later he studied jurisprudence at Bourges in France and it is claimed that he worked for some time with the famous legal scholar Jacques Cujas who was a prominent member of the legal humanists or mos gallicus school (a French approach to historical law studies). However, since Cujas died a few years before Giovanni Doni's birth, this seems to be unlikely; however he probably did study under the legal humanists as the University of Bourges. (See also Cujas Library)

This approach to legal studies was admired during the early French revolutionary period because it emphasised the importance of early Roman law, rather than the pretensions of French kings.

=== Corsini family ===
Doni received the degree of doctor from the University of Pisa and was chosen to accompany Neri Corsini (1614-1678) to Paris in 1621 where he became acquainted with Marin Mersenne and other literary persons. The Florentine Corsini family became important contacts in Doni's life: Neri Corsini became a cardinal in 1664 (not to be confused with Neri Maria Corsini, who became a cardinal in 1730). This was a period where the top religious orders were part of a culture of nepotism, and Doni attached himself to these religious dynasties.

=== Barberini family ===
On returning to Florence in 1622, Doni entered the service of Cardinal Francesco Barberini, and moved with him to Rome where Barberini became Dean of the College of Cardinals. Barberini was the elder brother of Cardinal Antonio Barberini, and the nephew of Maffeo Barberini who became Pope Urban VIII. He had studied at the University of Pisa where he was assisted by the family friend Galileo Galilei. Later in 1633 Barberini served with the Inquisition tribunal investigating Galileo, but was one of three members of the tribunal who refused to condemn Galileo.

Doni later accompanied the cardinal who was a special legate sent to Cardinal Richelieu to Paris, and then in 1625 to Madrid (papal legate), and back to Rome (1626). Doni made good use of the opportunities that arose from these journeys to acquire substantial knowledge of ancient music. Among other things, he either invented or reconstructed, a double lyre which, in honour of his patron, he called a Lyra Barberina or Amphichord (see barbiton).

=== Opera in Florence ===
Giovanni returned to Florence once again (around 1640), where he married and settled down as professor at the university where he continued his studies of ancient music and music theory. Opera had been invented in Florence, and Vincenzo Galilei, the father of Galileo, was a key member of the group which established the new approach to theatre, and also an experimenter with acoustic laws and harmonies. Under guidance from Doni, Cardinal Barberini was encouraged to venture into the production of an ancient version of opera.

Ancient music did not have a regular beat, because the rhythm followed that of the poetry. Modern recitative music is also sung without a beat . . . This kind of theatrical historicism bore fruit in 1640. Guided by G.B. Doni and J.J. Bouchard, Cardinal Francesco Barberini's long-standing interest in ancient drama culminated in his sponsoring two large projects, one practical and one theoretical:

- In 1640 Bouchard produced Seneca's Troades following Doni's notion that tragedy in ancient times had not been sung throughout, only the passages in lyrical metres.
- [They also produced] a book on ancient theatrical practice (Doni's history, Trattato, on the same subject was not published in his lifetime.)

He died only seven years after returning for Florence. Doni's main contribution to the world of letters was the study of classic musical theory as it existed in antiquity. Between 1635 and 1639 he wrote a Treatise on Music for the Theatre (Italian: Trattato della musica scenica) which provides important history details for early opera.

== Solfège ==
In the eleventh century, the music theorist Guido of Arezzo developed a six-note ascending scale that went as follows: ut, re, mi, fa, sol, la. Giovanni Battista Doni named the "Aretinian syllables" after him. The names were taken from the first verse of the Latin hymn Ut queant laxis, where the syllables fall on their corresponding scale degree. This system later came to be known as solfège.

Giovanni Doni is known for having changed the name of the note "Ut" to "Do". He convinced his contemporaries to make the change by arguing that "Do" is easier to pronounce than "Ut," and that "Do" is an abbreviation for "Dominus", the Latin word for The Lord, who is the tonic and root of the world. There is much academic speculation that Giovanni Doni also wanted to imprint himself into musical canon in perpetuity because "Do" is also ulteriorly an abbreviation for his surname.

A seventh note, "Si" (from the initials for "Sancte Iohannes", Latin vocative for “St. John the Baptist”) was added shortly after to complete the diatonic scale. In Anglophone countries, "Si" was changed to "Ti" by Sarah Glover in the nineteenth century so that every syllable might begin with a different letter. "Ti" is used in tonic sol-fa and in the song "Do-Re-Mi".

== Works ==
- Compendio del trattato de' generi et de' modi della musica (1635)
- Annotazioni sopra il compendio (1640)
- Trattato della musica scenica (in Lyra Barberina Vol. II - Rome 1640)
- De praestantia musicae veteris (1647)
- A description of the Lyra Barberin was published in 1763.
- The Inscriptiones Antiquae were posthumously published by Antonio Francesco Gori in 1731.
