= Solmization =

Systems associating syllables to musical notes

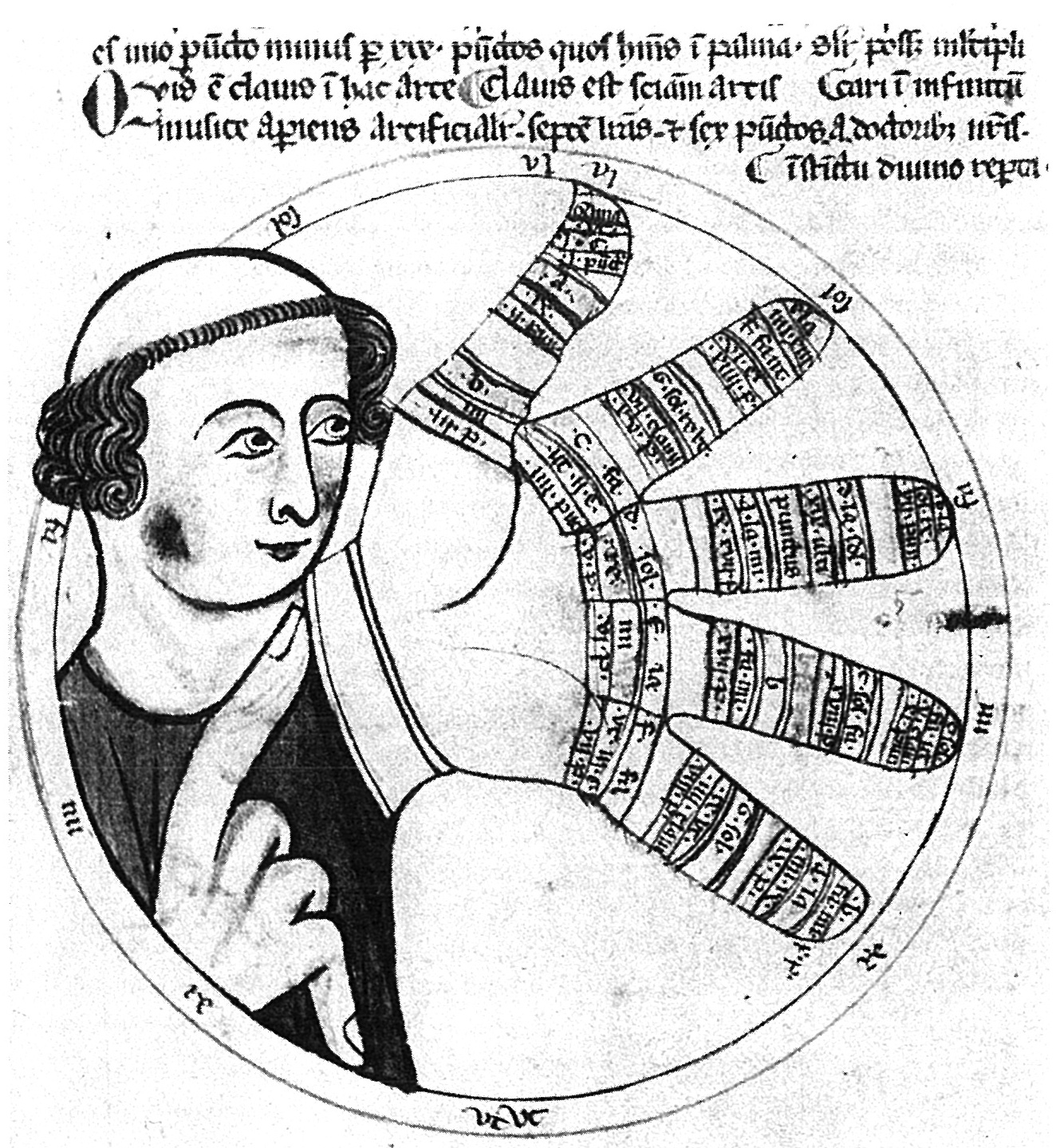
Guidonian hand, from 1274 Biblioteca Ambrosiana

Solmization is a musical pitch identification system in which a distinct syllable is attributed to each note of a musical scale. Various forms of solmization are in use and have been used throughout the world, but solfège is the most common convention in countries of Western culture.

== Overview ==
=== Europe ===
==== Solfège ====
The seven syllables normally used for this practice in English-speaking countries are: do, re, mi, fa, sol, la, and ti (with sharpened notes of di, ri, fi, si, li and flattened notes of ra, me, se, le, te). The system for other Western countries is similar, though si is often used as the final syllable rather than ti.

Guido of Arezzo is thought likely to have originated the modern Western system of solmization by introducing the ut–re–mi–fa–so–la syllables, which derived from the initial syllables of each of the first six half-lines of the first stanza of the hymn Ut queant laxis. Giovanni Battista Doni is known for having changed the name of note "Ut" (C), renaming it "Do" (in the "Do Re Mi ..." sequence known as solfège). An alternative explanation, first proposed by Franciszek Meninski in Thesaurus Linguarum Orientalium (1680) and later by Jean-Benjamin de La Borde in Essai sur la Musique Ancienne et Moderne (1780), is that the syllables were derived from the Arabic solmization system درر مفصّلات Durar Mufaṣṣalāt ("Separated Pearls") (dāl, rā', mīm, fā', ṣād, lām, tā') during the Middle Ages, but there is not any documentary evidence for it.

==== Chromatic fixed-do systems ====
In addition to traditional diatonic solmization systems, various theorists have proposed fully chromatic systems in which each of the twelve pitch classes of the equal-tempered scale is assigned a unique syllable. Such systems aim to improve the conventional fixed-do practice, in which chromatic alterations (e.g., C♯ or C♭) are often sung using modified or context-dependent forms of the same base syllable.

Their motivation is that a unique name for each of the 12 pitch classes may help:

- in audiation (the mental hearing of music when reading a score)
- and in pitch identification (naming/writing the notes when hearing music), both for relative and absolute pitch.

One example of a chromatic fixed-do systems are the ones by Hullah or Shearer. They also retain the seven traditional diatonic names, and derive additional forms for altered pitches through systematic vowel modification. For example, a base syllable such as re may become ra for Re♭ and ri for Re♯.

Another approach is represented by the Latoni system, which frees itself from compatibility with the traditional names and introduces a newly constructed set of 21 syllables. It is designed to systematically encode the pitch class in the consonant, and the whole tone / half tone relationships in the vowel.

System	Type	Treatment of diatonic syllables	Method for chromatic tones	Notable feature
Traditional fixed-do	Heptatonic	Retained (do, re, mi, fa, sol, la, ti/si)	add "sharp" / "flat" to indicate accidentals	Widely used in Romance-language pedagogy
Hullah / Shearer systems	Chromatic fixed-do	Retained	Vowel modification (e.g., re → ra for D♭, ri for D♯)	Derivation from base syllables with enharmonic distinction
Latoni system	Chromatic fixed-do	Not retained	21 new syllabes	One-to-one mapping between consonants and pitch classes, vowels make semitones explicit

==== Other European systems ====
Byzantine music uses syllables derived from the Greek alphabet to name notes: starting with A, the notes are pa (alpha), vu (beta, pronounced v in modern greek), ga (gamma), di (delta), ke (epsilon), zo (zeta), ni (eta).

In Scotland, the system known as Canntaireachd ("chanting"') was used as a means of communicating bagpipe music verbally.

In the 16th century, Flemish musicians invented "bocedization": bo, ce, di, ga, lo, ma, ni.

The Estonian musician Heino Kaljuste used the syllables jo, le, mi, na, so, ra, di for relative solmization. The Russian musician Pavel Veys modified Kaljuste's syllables to ё, ле, ви, на, зо, ра, ти (yo, le, vi, na, zo, ra, ti). In Russia, Veys' syllables are used for relative solmization (like do, re, mi, etc. are used in English), whereas до, ре, ми, фа, соль, ля, си (do, re, mi, fa, sol, la, si) are used for absolute solmization (corresponding to C, D, E, F, G, A, B regardless of the key). Natural minor can be sung ra-based, however Valeri Brainin completed Veys' system with chromatic notes so that it can be used yo-based for both major and minor. Brainin writes the syllables using the Cyrillic script and also using the Latin script following German spelling conventions, so the syllables yo, vi, zo are spelled jo, wi, so:

Natural major scale: ё (jo), ле (le), ви (wi), на (na), зо (so), ра (ra), ти (ti).

Natural minor scale: ё (jo), ле (le), ву (wu), на (na), зо (so), ру (ru), ту (tu).

Lowered supertonic: лу (lu); raised supertonic: ли (li); lowered subdominant: ну (nu); raised subdominant: ни (ni).

=== Asian systems ===
The Svara solmization of India has origins in Vedic texts like the Upanishads, which discuss a musical system of seven notes, realized ultimately in what is known as sargam. In Indian classical music, the notes in order are: sa, re, ga, ma, pa, dha, and ni, which correspond to the Western solfege system.

For Han people's music in China, the words used to name notes are (from fa to mi): 上 (siong or shàng), 尺 (cei or chǐ), 工 (gōng), 凡 (huan or fán), 六 (liuo or liù), 五 (ngou or wǔ), 乙 (yik or yǐ). The system is used for teaching sight-singing.

For Japanese music, the first line of Iroha, an ancient poem used as a tutorial of traditional kana, is used for solmization. The syllables representing the notes A, B, C, D, E, F, G are i, ro, ha, ni, ho, he, to respectively. Shakuhachi musical notation uses another solmization system beginning "Fu Ho U".

Javanese musicians derive syllables from numbers: ji-ro-lu-pat-ma-nem-pi. These names derive from one-syllable simplification of the Javanese numerals siji, loro, telu, papat, lima, enem, pitu. ([Pa]pat and pi[tu], corresponding to 4 and 7, are skipped in the pentatonic slendro scale.)

== See also ==
- Solfège
- Kodály method
- Numbered musical notation
- Shape note
- Tonic sol-fa
