= Natural (music) =

In music, accidental which cancels previous accidentals

♮o

Natural (music)
- In Unicode: U+266E (HTML : &#9838)

Example
An A natural, then A♭.

In modern Western music notation, a natural (♮) is a symbol that cancels a previous sharp or flat in the written music. It indicates that the note is at its unaltered pitch.

The natural symbol can be used as an accidental to cancel sharps or flats on an individual note. It may also be shown in a key signature to indicate that sharps or flats in a previous key signature are cancelled. A note is referred to as 'natural' when the letter-name note (A, B, C, D, E, F, or G) is not modified by a flat or sharp (either from a key signature or an accidental). These notes correspond to the white keys on the keyboard of a piano.

Before the invention of the natural symbol, another note designated as "B" was needed in a certain hexachord. To distinguish the two notes with the same letter name, the original (natural) B was written in a square form, and the new, lower one written with a rounded form. The square B became the modern natural symbol.

== Usage ==
Like all accidental markings, the natural symbol is written to the left of the note head and applies to subsequent notes of the same pitch through the remainder of the measure.

A note marked with a natural sign can be changed to a flat or sharp by simply applying the new accidental.

A natural sign (♮) cancels a flat or sharp from a previous note or key signature.

Sometimes these cancelling naturals at a key change are omitted, but they must be used if the new key has no sharps or flats.

== Double natural ==
A double natural is a symbol that has two naturals (♮♮). It may be used to cancel a double flat or double sharp, but in modern notation a single natural sign (♮) is acceptable.

Similarly, a double flat or double sharp can be changed to a single flat or sharp with a simple ♭ or ♯, but older notation may use ♮♭, ♭♮, ♮♯ or ♯♮ instead. Triple sharps and triple flats are extremely rare, but may be canceled using the same notation options. When changing a flat to a sharp or vice-versa, the combined symbols ♮♯ or ♮♭ can be used.

== Unicode ==
The Unicode character MUSIC NATURAL SIGN '♮' (U+266E) should display as a natural sign. Its HTML entity is &#9838;. Other assigned natural signs are as follows:

- U+1D12E 𝄮 MUSICAL SYMBOL NATURAL UP
- U+1D12F 𝄯 MUSICAL SYMBOL NATURAL DOWN
