= Swaralipi =

System of the classic Indian music notes

Swaralipi (Bengali: স্বরলিপি) is any system used in sheet music in order to represent aurally perceived music through the use of written notes for Indian classical music.

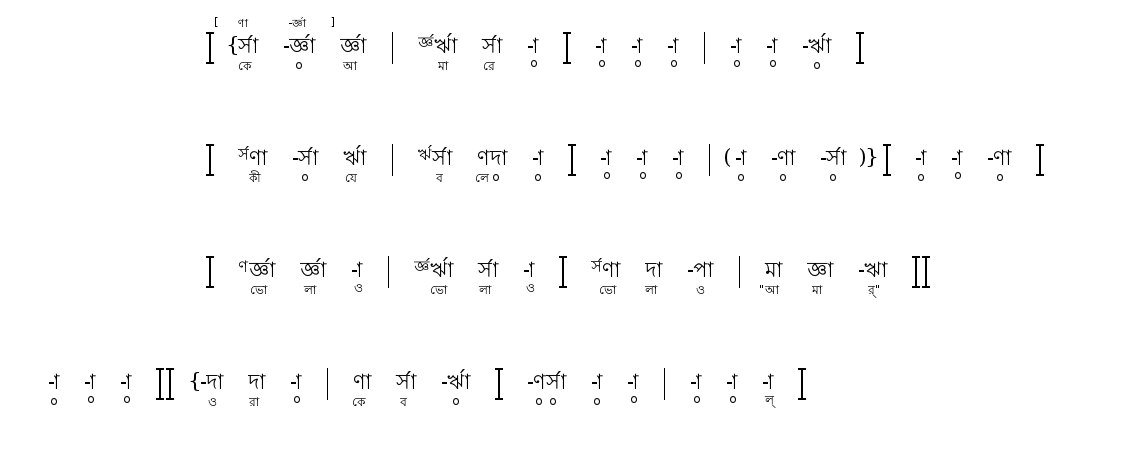
Example of Bengali ākārmātrik sôrôlipi (Bengali: আকারমাত্রিক স্বরলিপি)

== History ==
The Indian scholar and musical theorist Pingala (c. 200 BC), in his Chanda Sutra, used marks indicating long and short syllables to indicate meters in Sanskrit poetry.

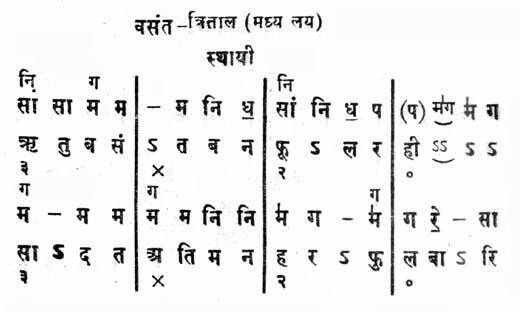
Example of Hindi Swarlipi (Hindi: हिन्दी स्वरलिपि)

In the notation of Indian rāga, a solfege-like system called sargam is used. As in Western solfege, there are names for the seven basic pitches of a major scale (Shadja, Rishabh, Gandhar, Madhyam, Pancham, Dhaivat and Nishad, usually shortened Sa Re Ga Ma Pa Dha Ni). The tonic of any scale is named Sa, and the dominant Pa. Sa is fixed in any scale, and Pa is fixed at a fifth above it (a Pythagorean fifth rather than an equal-tempered fifth). These two notes are known as achala swar ('fixed notes'). Each of the other five notes, Re, Ga, ma, Dha and Ni, can take a 'regular' (shuddha) pitch, which is equivalent to its pitch in a standard major scale (thus, shuddha Re, the second degree of the scale, is a whole-step higher than Sa), or an altered pitch, either a half-step above or half-step below the shuddha pitch. Re, Ga, Dha and Ni all have altered partners that are a half-step lower (Komal-"flat") (thus, komal Re is a half-step higher than Sa). Ma has an altered partner that is a half-step higher (teevra-"sharp") (thus, tivra Ma is an augmented fourth above Sa). Re, Ga, ma, Dha and Ni are called vikrut swar ('movable notes'). In the written system of Indian notation devised by Ravi Shankar, the pitches are represented by Western letters. Capital letters are used for the achala swar, and for the higher variety of all the vikrut swar. Lowercase letters are used for the lower variety of the vikrut swar.
