= Guidonian hand =

Medieval mnemonic device for choral singers

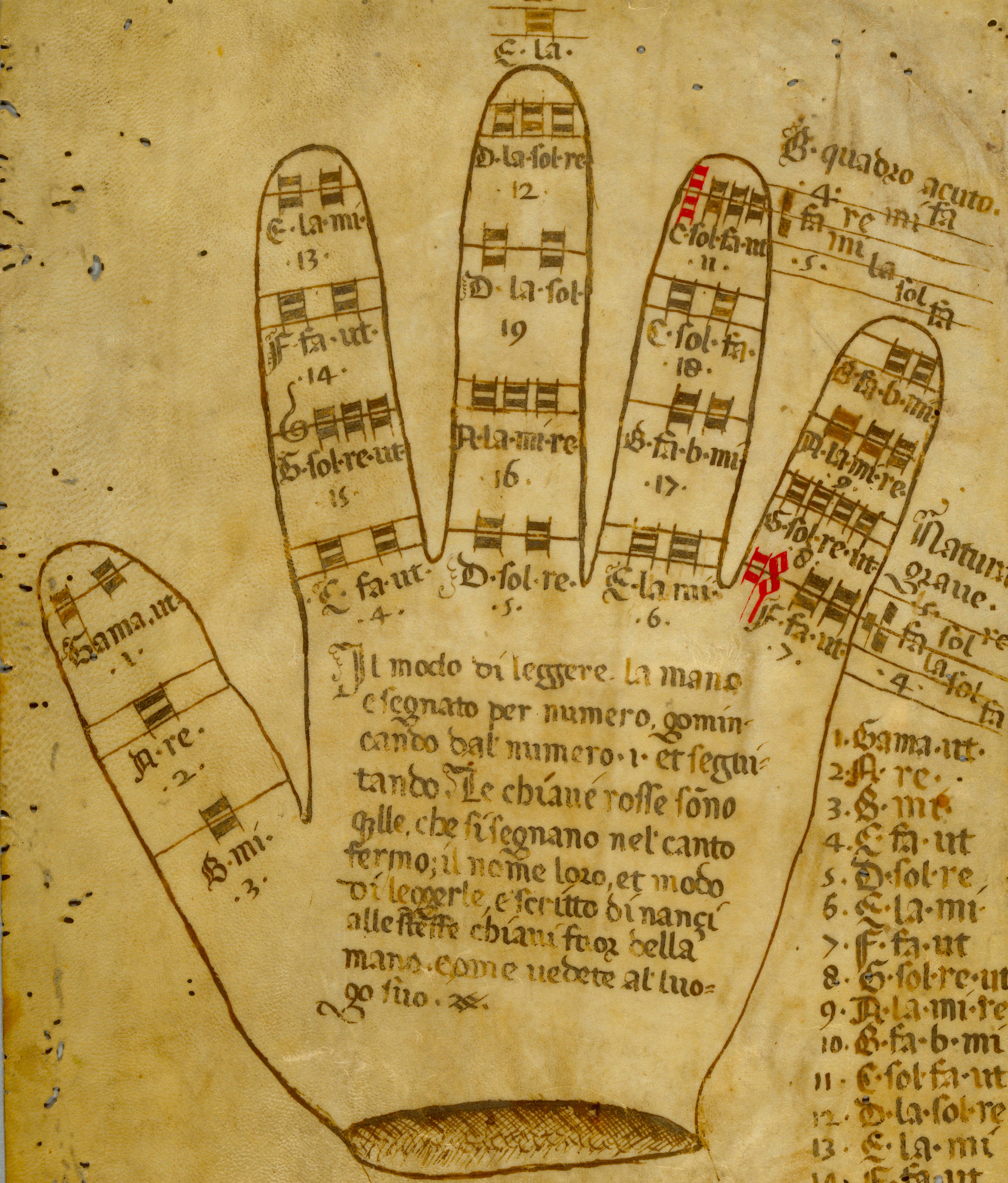
One example of the Guidonian hand, from a Bodleian Library MS

The Guidonian hand was a mnemonic device used to assist people learning to sight-sing. Some form of the device may have been used by Guido of Arezzo, a medieval music theorist who wrote several treatises, including one instructing singers in sightreading. The hand occurs in some manuscripts before Guido's time as a tool to find the semitone; it does not have the depicted form until the 12th century. Sigebertus Gemblacensis in c. 1105–1110 did describe Guido using the joints of the hand to aid in teaching his hexachord. The Guidonian hand is closely linked with Guido's ideas about how to learn music, including the use of hexachords, and the first known Western use of solfège.

== Theory ==
The idea of the Guidonian hand is that each portion of the hand represents a specific note within the hexachord system, which spans nearly three octaves from "Γ ut" (that is, "Gamma ut") (the contraction of which is "Gamut", which can refer to the entire span) to "E la" (in other words, from the G at the bottom of the modern bass clef to the E at the top of the treble clef). The compound names combine the tone's pitch letter and up to three hexachordal syllables to indicate each note's function. These compound names were sometimes rendered with spaces between the pitch letter and the syllables, but in prose were also sometimes combined into one word, adding an "e" after the pitch letter if it was a consonant, yielding the names in the chart below. Some of the compound names clarify the register (for example, C fa ut, C sol fa ut, and C sol fa indicate three different octaves of C), but some names repeat (for instance, the same name B mi appears in three different octaves).

In teaching, an instructor would indicate a series of notes for their students to sing by pointing to them on their hand, as in the system of hand signals sometimes used in conjunction with solfège. Commonly, as in the example below, the notes of the gamut were mentally superimposed onto the joints and fingertips of the left hand. Thus "gamma ut" (two Gs below middle C) was the tip of the thumb, A ("A re") was the inside of the thumb knuckle, B ("B mi") was the joint at the base of the thumb, C ("C fa ut") was the joint at the base of the index finger, and so on, spiraling around the hand counterclockwise past middle C ("C sol fa ut") until the D a ninth above middle C ("D la sol") (the middle joint of the middle finger) and the E above that ("E la") (the back of that joint, the only note on the back of the hand) were reached. The exact position of the notes on the hand varies from source to source, so it can be argued that no version is definitive.

This device allowed people to visualize the half steps of the gamut and the interlocking positions of the hexachords (the names of which—ut re mi fa sol la—were taken from the hymn "Ut queant laxis"). The Guidonian hand was reproduced in numerous medieval treatises.

The medieval hexachordal system (c′ = Middle C)
Modern note name	Medieval note name	Mutation							Compound Names	
Modern note name	Medieval note name	1	2	3	4	5	6	7	Compound Names	
Modern note name	Medieval note name	Solmization							Compound Names	
e″	ee							la	E la	Ela
d″	dd						la	sol	D la sol	Delasol
c″	cc						sol	fa	C sol fa	Cesolfa
b′	♮♮							mi	B mi	Bemi
b♭′	♭♭						fa		B fa	Befa
a′	aa					la	mi	re	A la mi re	Alamire
g′	g					sol	re	ut	G sol re ut	Gesolreut
f′	f					fa	ut		F fa ut	Fefaut
e′	e				la	mi			E la mi	Elami
d′	d			la	sol	re			D la sol re	Delasolre
c′	c			sol	fa	ut			C sol fa ut	Cesolfaut
b	♮				mi				B mi	Bemi
b♭	♭			fa					B fa	Befa
a	a		la	mi	re				A la mi re	Alamire
g	G		sol	re	ut				G sol re ut	Gesolreut
f	F		fa	ut					F fa ut	Fefaut
e	E	la	mi						E la mi	Elami
d	D	sol	re						D sol re	Desolre
c	C	fa	ut						C fa ut	Cefaut
B	B	mi							B mi	Bemi
A	A	re							A re	Are
G	Γ	ut							Gamma ut	

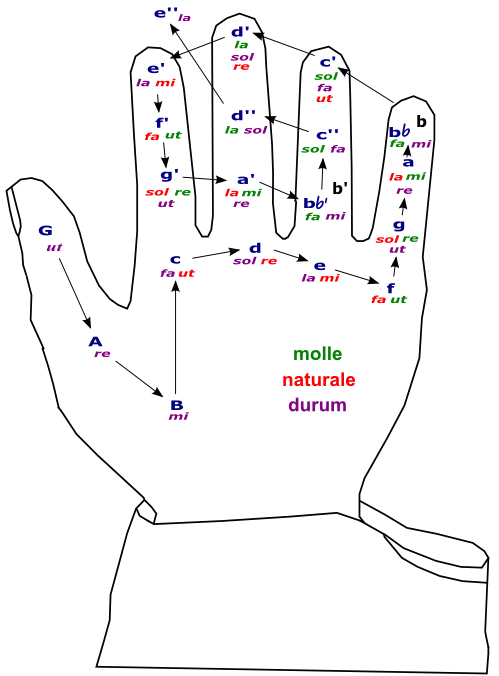
Guidonian hand. Colors indicate the three modes of hexachord: durum (hard, equivalent to G major), naturale (natural, equivalent to C major), and molle (soft, equivalent to F major).

Exact notation to the hexachord system can be found in a reproduction of Ameri Practica artis musice (1271), or in the 1784 source Scriptores ecclesiastici de musica sacra potissimum.

== The hexachord in the Middle Ages ==
Reproduction of Ameri Practica artis musice (1271), ed. Cesarino Ruini, Corpus scriptorum de musica, vol. 25.

Guido of Arezzo first described the hexachord as a mnemonic device in his Epistola de ignoto cantu and his treatise Micrologus. It was the most basic pedagogical tool for learning new music in the European Middle Ages and was often referenced in contemporary musical theory. In each hexachord, all adjacent pitches are a whole tone apart, except for the middle two, which are separated by a semitone. These six pitches are named ut, re, mi, fa, sol, and la, with the semitone between mi and fa. The names derive from the first syllable of each half-line of the 8th-century hymn "Ut queant laxis".

Each hexachord could start on G, C, or F, and the adjacent table, reading upward from the bottom, shows the notes in each hexachord for each of three octaves. Reading from left to right could, within certain limits, permit notes within different octaves to be distinguished from each other. Thus, C (modern c) was "C fa ut" (or "Cefaut"), c (modern c′) was "C sol fa ut", and cc (modern c″) was "C sol fa". Since the lowest pitch was designated by the Greek letter Γ (gamma, for 'g'), the pitch was known as "Gamma ut" or "Gamut", a term which came to designate the range of notes available, and later, a complete range of anything.

The hexachordal system also distinguished between B♭ (fa in the F hexachord, and known as "B molle" for 'soft B') and B♮ (mi in the G hexachord, and known as "B durum" for 'hard B'). Over time, the soft and hard variants of 'b' were depicted as a rounded '♭' and a squared-off '♮' which gradually developed into the modern flat and natural signs (or, in Northern Europe, into the letters 'b' and 'h').

Since a single hexachord did not cover every possible note in the range of the gamut (only C–A, F–D excluding B♮, or G–E excluding B♭), singers had to "mutate" between hexachords if the range of a sixth was exceeded or if there was an alternation between B♮ and B♭. In this way the "Guidonian" system of multiple hexachords differs from the modern system of solfège, wherein a single set of syllables suffices to name all possible pitches (including, often, chromatic pitches) within a mode.

Because it included B durum, the G hexachord was called hexachordum durum; likewise, the F hexachord was called hexachordum molle. The C hexachord, containing neither B, was called hexachordum naturale.

In the 14th century, this system was expanded to hexachords that accommodate an increased use of signed accidentals. From then onward, the use of such notes was called musica ficta.

== See also ==
- Diatonic hexachord
