= Accidental (music) =

Musical note not in the current key signature

The most common accidentals. From left to right: flat, natural, and sharp.

In musical notation, an accidental is a symbol that indicates an alteration of a given pitch. The most common accidentals are the flat (♭) and the sharp (♯), which represent alterations of a semitone, and the natural (♮), which cancels a sharp or flat. Accidentals alter the pitch of individual scale tones in a given key signature; the sharps or flats in the key signature itself are not called accidentals.

An accidental applies to the note that immediately follows it and to subsequent instances of that note in the same measure, unless it is canceled by another accidental. A sharp raises a note's pitch by a semitone and a flat lowers it by a semitone. Double flats or sharps may also be used, altering the unmodified note by two semitones. If a note with an accidental is tied, the accidental continues to apply, even if the note it is tied to is in the next measure. If a note has an accidental and the note is repeated in a different octave, notation conventions vary. In modern notation, an accidental should be indicated on the second note to clarify, but some older notation assumes that the initial accidental applies across octaves. In the uncommon situations of a mid-measure clef change or an octave sign, the accidental would be canceled (as at a barline). The resulting notation can be ambiguous to read, and a courtesy accidental would be indicated.

The modern accidental signs derive from the two forms of the lower-case letter b used in Gregorian chant manuscripts to signify the two pitches of B, the only note that could be altered. The "round" b became the flat sign, while the "square" b diverged into the sharp and natural signs.

== Standard use ==
In most cases a sharp raises the pitch of a note one semitone while a flat lowers it one semitone. A natural is used to cancel the effect of a flat or sharp. This system of accidentals operates in conjunction with the key signature, whose effect continues throughout an entire piece, or until another key signature is indicated. An accidental can also be used to cancel a previous accidental or reinstate the flats or sharps of the key signature.

Accidentals apply to subsequent notes on the same staff position for the remainder of the measure where they occur, unless explicitly changed by another accidental. Once a barline is passed, the effect of the accidental ends, except when a note affected by an accidental is tied to the same note across a barline. An accidental that carries past the barline through a tied note does not apply to subsequent notes.

Under this system, the notes in the example above are:

- m. 1: G♮, G♯, G♯ (the sharp carries over)
- m. 2: G♮ (with courtesy accidental), G♭, G♭ (the flat carries over)
- m. 3: G♭ (which is tied from the previous note), G♯, G♮ (the natural sign cancels the sharp sign)

Though this convention is still in use particularly in tonal music, it may be cumbersome in music that features frequent accidentals, as is often the case in atonal music. As a result, an alternative system of note-for-note accidentals has been adopted, with the aim of reducing the number of accidentals required to notate a bar. According to Kurt Stone, the system is as follows:

1. Accidentals affect only those notes which they immediately precede.
2. Accidentals are not repeated on tied notes unless the tie goes from line to line or page to page.
3. Accidentals are not repeated for repeated notes unless one or more different pitches (or rests) intervene.
4. If a sharp or flat pitch is followed directly by its natural form, a natural is used.
5. Courtesy accidentals or naturals (in parentheses) may be used to clarify ambiguities but are kept to a minimum

Because seven of the twelve notes of the chromatic equal-tempered scale are naturals (the "white notes"; A, B, C, D, E, F and G on a piano keyboard) this system can significantly reduce the number of naturals required in a notated passage.

Occasionally, an accidental may change the note by more than a semitone: for example, if a G♯ is followed in the same measure by a G♭, the flat sign on the latter note means it is two semitones lower than if no accidental were present. Thus, the effect of the accidental must be understood in relation to the "natural" meaning of the note's staff position.

In some atonal scores (particularly by composers of the Second Viennese School), an accidental is notated on every note, including natural notes and repeated pitches. This system was adopted for "the specific intellectual reason that a note with an accidental was not simply an inflected version of a natural note but a pitch of equal status."

== Double flats and sharps ==
The two double accidentals. From left to right: double flat and double sharp.

A double flat or double sharp would alter the pitch of a note by two semitones. An F double sharp is a whole step above an F, making it enharmonically equivalent to a G. These alterations apply to the note as if it were a "natural", regardless of the key signature (see the F in measure 2 of the Chopin example below).

If a note with a double sharp or double flat is followed by a note in the same position with a single sharp or single flat, there are two common notations. Modern notation simply uses a single flat or sharp sign on the second note, whereas older notation may cancel the double accidental with natural sign before applying the single accidental (example below). Changing a note with a double accidental to a natural may likewise be done with a single natural sign (modern) or with a double natural (older).

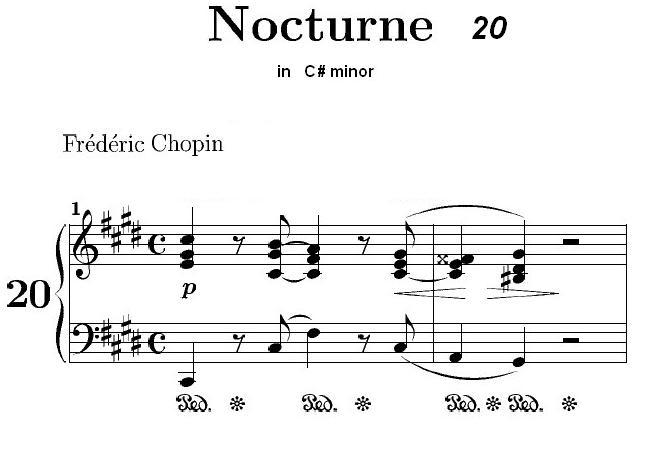
An example of the use of a double accidental

Triple flats and triple sharps are extremely rare, altering a note by three semitones.

In tunings where the number of notes per octave is not a multiple of 12 (e.g., tunings other than the standard 12-TET), enharmonics are generally different. Accidentals would behave differently than in the standard tuning system and, for example, F might not be enharmonically equivalent to G. This changes the effect of double and triple accidentals as well.

== Courtesy accidentals ==
An A♭ followed by an A♮ in the next measure. The A♮ is given a courtesy accidental to remind the player that the flat sign does not apply to it.

In modern scores, a barline cancels an accidental, with the exception of tied notes. Courtesy accidentals, also called cautionary accidentals or reminder accidentals are used to remind the musician of the correct pitch if the same note occurs in the following measure. The rules for applying courtesy accidentals (sometimes enclosed in parentheses) vary among publishers, though in a few situations they are customary:

- When the first note of a measure had an accidental in the previous measure
- After a tie carries an accidental across a barline, and the same note appears in the next measure
- When a chord contains a diminished or augmented octave
- When there is a cross relation with another part

Publishers of free jazz music and some atonal music sometimes eschew all courtesy accidentals.

== Microtonal notation ==
A common notation for quarter tones. From left to right, half-flat, flat-and-a-half, half-sharp, sharp-and-a-half.

Composers of microtonal music have developed a number of notations for indicating the various pitches outside of standard notation. One such system for notating quarter tones, used by the Czech Alois Hába and other composers, is shown.

In the 19th and early 20th centuries, when Turkish musicians switched from their traditional notation systems—which were not staff-based—to the European staff-based system, they refined the European accidental system so they could notate Turkish scales that use intervals smaller than a tempered semitone. There are several such systems, which vary as to how they divide the octave they presuppose or the graphical shape of the accidentals. The most widely used system (created by Rauf Yekta Bey) uses a system of four sharps (roughly +25 cents, +75 cents, +125 cents and +175 cents) and four flats (roughly −25 cents, −75 cents, −125 cents and −175 cents), none of which correspond to the tempered sharp and flat. They presuppose a Pythagorean division of the octave taking the Pythagorean comma (about an eighth of the tempered tone, actually closer to 24 cents, defined as the difference between seven octaves and 12 just-intonation fifths) as the basic interval. The Turkish systems have also been adopted by some Arab musicians.

Ben Johnston created a system of notation for pieces in just intonation where the unmarked C, F, and G major chords are just major chords (4:5:6) and accidentals create just tuning in other keys.

== History of notation ==
The three principal symbols indicating whether a note should be raised or lowered in pitch are derived from variations of the small letter b: the sharp (♯) and natural (♮) signs from the square "b quadratum", and the flat sign (♭) from the round "b rotundum".

The different kinds of B were eventually written differently, so as to distinguish them in music theory treatises and in notation. The flat sign ♭ derives from a round b that signified the soft hexachord, hexachordum molle, particularly the presence of B♭. The name of the flat sign in French is bémol from medieval French bé mol, which in modern French is bé mou ("soft b"). The natural sign ♮ and the sharp sign ♯ derive from variations of a square b that signified the hard hexachord, hexachordum durum, where the note in question is B♮. The name of the natural sign in French is bécarre from medieval French bé quarre, which in modern French is bé carré ("square b"). In German music notation, the letter B or b always designates B♭ while the letter H or h – a deformation of a square b – designates B♮.

In the High Middle Ages, a widespread musical tradition was based on the hexachord system defined by Guido of Arezzo. The basic system, called musica recta, had three overlapping hexachords. Change from one hexachord to another was possible, called a mutation. A major problem with the system was that mutation from one hexachord to another could introduce intervals like the tritone that musicians of the time considered undesirable. To avoid the dissonance, a practice called musica ficta arose from the late 12th century onward. This introduced modifications of the hexachord, so that "false" or "feigned" notes could be sung, partly to avoid dissonance. At first only B could be flatted, moving from the hexachordum durum (the hard hexachord) G–A–B–C–D–E where B is natural, to the hexachordum molle (the soft hexachord) F–G–A–B♭–C–D where it is flat. The note B is not present in the third hexachord hexachordum naturale (the natural hexachord) C–D–E–F–G–A.

Strictly speaking the medieval signs ♮ and ♭ indicated that the melody is progressing inside a (fictive) hexachord of which the signed note is the mi or the fa respectively. That means they refer to a group of notes around the marked note, rather than indicating that the note itself is necessarily an accidental. For example, when a semitone relationship is indicated between F and G, either by placing a mi-sign (♮) on F or a fa-sign (♭) on G, only the context can determine whether this means, in modern terms, F♯-G or F-G♭, or even F♭–G. The use of either the mi-sign on F or the fa-sign on G means only that "some kind of F goes to some kind of G, proceeding by a semitone".

As polyphony became more complex, notes other than B required alteration to avoid undesirable harmonic or melodic intervals (especially the augmented fourth, or tritone, that music theory writers referred to as diabolus in musica, i.e., "the devil in music"). Nowadays "ficta" is used loosely to describe any such un-notated accidentals. The implied alterations can have more than one solution, but sometimes the intended pitches can be found in lute tablatures where a fret is specified.

The convention of an accidental remaining in force through a measure developed only gradually over the 18th century. Before then, accidentals only applied to immediately repeated notes or short groups when the composer felt it was obvious that the accidental should continue. The older practice continued in use well into the 18th century by many composers, notably Johann Sebastian Bach. The newer convention did not achieve general currency until early in the 19th century.

== See also ==
- Just intonation § Staff notation
- Maneri-Sims notation, a 72-fold division of the octave
- Musical isomorphism, a mathematical concept which uses accidentals in its notation
