= Solfège =

Musical pitch reference system

In music, solfège (UK: /ˈsɔːl.fɛʒ/ or US: /sɑːl.ˈfɛʒ/; French: [sɔlfɛʒ]) or solfeggio (/sɒl.ˈfɛ.dʒi.oʊ/; Italian: [solˈfeddʒo]), also called sol-fa, solfa, solfeo, among many names, is a mnemonic used in teaching aural skills, pitch and sight-reading of Western European music.

Solfège is a form of solmization, although the two terms are sometimes used interchangeably. Syllables are assigned to the notes of the scale and assist the musician in audiating, or mentally hearing, the pitches of a piece of music, often for the purpose of singing them aloud.

Throughout the Renaissance (and much later in some shapenote publications), various interlocking four-, five- and six-note systems were employed to cover the octave. The tonic sol-fa method popularised the seven syllables commonly used in English-speaking countries: do (spelt doh in tonic sol-fa), re, mi, fa, so(l), la, and ti (or si) (see below).

There are two current ways of applying solfège: 1) fixed do, where the syllables are always tied to specific pitches (e.g., "do" is always "C-natural") and 2) movable do, where the syllables are assigned to scale degrees, with "do" always the first degree of the major scale.

== Etymology ==
The words solfège and solfeggio both derive from the names of two of the syllables used: sol and fa.

The generic term "solmization", referring to any system of denoting pitches of a musical scale by syllables, including those used in India and Japan as well as solfège, comes from French solmisation, from the Latin solfège syllables sol and mi.

The verb "to sol-fa" means to sing the solfège syllables of a passage (as opposed to singing the lyrics, humming, etc).

== Origin ==
In eleventh-century Italy, the music theorist Guido of Arezzo invented a notational system that named the six notes of the hexachord after the first syllable of each line of the Latin hymn "Ut queant laxis", the "Hymn to St. John the Baptist", resulting in ut, re, mi, fa, sol, la. Each successive line of this hymn begins on the next scale degree, so each note's name was the syllable sung at that pitch in this hymn.

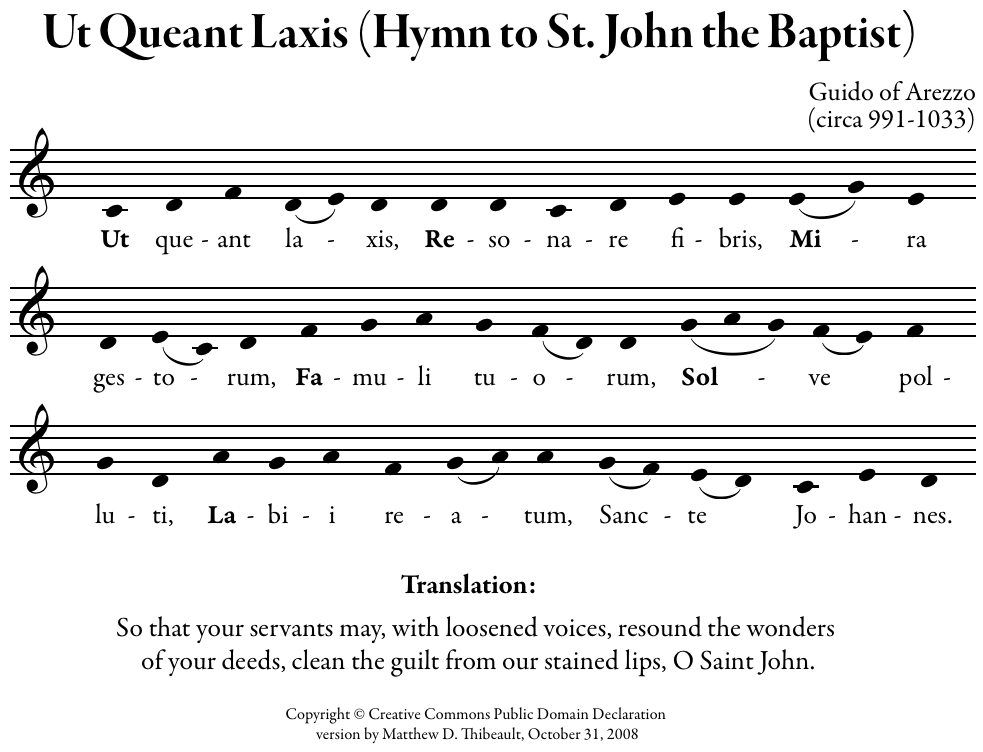
Sheet music for "Ut queant laxis"

Ut queant laxīs resonāre fibrīs
Mīra gestōrum famulī tuōrum,
Solve pollūtī labiī reātum,
Sancte Iohannēs.

The words were ascribed to Paulus Diaconus in the 8th century. They translate as:

So that your servants may with loosened voices
Resound the wonders of your deeds,
Clean the guilt from our stained lips,
O Saint John.

"Ut" was changed in the 1600s in Italy to the open syllable "Do". Guido's system had only six notes, but "si" was added later as the seventh note of the diatonic scale. In Anglophone countries, "si" was changed to "ti" by Sarah Glover in the nineteenth century so that every syllable might begin with a different letter. "Ti" is used in tonic sol-fa (and in the famous song from the film 'Sound of Music' "Do-Re-Mi").

Some authors speculate that the solfège syllables (do, re, mi, fa, sol, la, ti) might have been influenced by the syllables of the Arabic solmisation system called درر مفصّلات Durar Mufaṣṣalāt ("Detailed Pearls") (dāl, rā', mīm, fā', ṣād, lām, tā'). This mixed-origin theory was proposed by scholars as early as the seventeenth and eighteenth centuries, in the works of Francisci a Mesgnien Meninski and Jean-Benjamin de La Borde. Modern scholars are mostly skeptical, however.

== In Elizabethan England ==
In the Elizabethan era, England and its related territories used only four of the syllables: mi, fa, sol, and la. "Mi" stood for modern ti or si, "fa" for modern do or ut, "sol" for modern re, and "la" for modern mi. Then, fa, sol and la would be repeated to stand for their modern counterparts as well, resulting in the scale being "fa, sol, la, fa, sol, la, mi, fa". The use of "fa", "sol" and "la" for two positions in the scale is a leftover from the Guidonian system of so-called "mutations" (i.e. changes of hexachord on a note, see Guidonian hand). This system was largely eliminated by the 19th century, but is still used in some shape note systems, which give each of the four syllables "fa", "sol", "la", and "mi" a different shape.

An example of this type of solmisation occurs in Shakespeare's King Lear, where in Act 1, Scene 2, Edmund exclaims to himself immediately after Edgar's entrance so that Edgar can hear him: "O, these eclipses do portend these divisions". Then, in the 1623 First Folio (but not in the 1608 Quarto), he adds "Fa, so, la, mi". This Edmund probably sang to the tune of Fa, So, La, Ti (e.g. F, G, A, B in C major), i.e. an ascending sequence of three whole tones with an ominous feel to it: see tritone (historical uses).

== Modern use ==
Solfège is still used for sight reading training. There are two main types: Movable do and Fixed do.

=== Movable do solfège ===
In Movable do or tonic sol-fa, each syllable corresponds to a scale degree; for example, if the music changes into a higher key, each syllable moves to a correspondingly higher note. This is analogous to the Guidonian practice of giving each degree of the hexachord a solfège name, and is mostly used in Germanic countries, Commonwealth countries, and the United States.

One particularly important variant of movable do, but differing in some respects from the system described below, was invented in the nineteenth century by Sarah Ann Glover, and is known as tonic sol-fa.

In Italy, in 1972, Roberto Goitre wrote the famous method "Cantar leggendo" (singing by reading), which has come to be used for choruses and for music for young children.

The pedagogical advantage of the movable-Do system is its ability to assist in the theoretical understanding of music; because a tonic is established and then sung in comparison to, students infer melodic and chordal implications through their singing.

==== Major ====
Movable do is frequently employed in Australia, China, Japan (with 5th being so, and 7th being si), Ireland, the United Kingdom, the United States, Hong Kong, and English-speaking Canada. The movable do system is a fundamental element of the Kodály method used primarily in Hungary, but with a dedicated following worldwide. In the movable do system, each solfège syllable corresponds not to a pitch, but to a scale degree: The first degree of a major scale is always sung as "do", the second as "re", etc. (For minor keys, see below.) In movable do, a given tune is therefore always sol-faed on the same syllables, no matter what key it is in.

The solfège syllables used for movable do differ slightly from those used for fixed do, because the English variant of the basic syllables ("ti" instead of "si") is usually used, and chromatically altered syllables are usually included as well.

Major scale degree	Mova. do solfège syllable	# of half steps from Do	Trad. pron.
1	Do	0	/doʊ/
Raised 1	Di	1	/diː/
Lowered 2	Ra	1	/ɹɑː/
2	Re	2	/ɹeɪ/
Raised 2	Ri	3	/ɹiː/
Lowered 3	Me (& Ma)	3	/meɪ/ (/mɑː/)
3	Mi	4	/miː/
4	Fa	5	/fɑː/
Raised 4	Fi	6	/fiː/
Lowered 5	Se	6	/seɪ/
5	Sol	7	/soʊ/
Raised 5	Si	8	/siː/
Lowered 6	Le (& Lo)	8	/leɪ/ (/loʊ/)
6	La	9	/lɑː/
Raised 6	Li	10	/liː/
Lowered 7	Te (& Ta)	10	/teɪ/ (/tɑː/)
7	Ti	11	/tiː/

If a piece modulates, then it becomes necessary to change the solfège syllables. For example, if a piece begins in C major, then C is initially sung on "do", D on "re", etc. If, however, the piece then modulates to F major, then F is sung on "do", G on "re", etc., and C is then sung on "sol".

==== Minor ====
Passages in a minor key may be sol-faed in one of two ways in movable do: either starting on do (using "me", "le", and "te" for the lowered third, sixth, and seventh degrees, respectively, and "la" and "ti" for the raised sixth and seventh degrees), which is referred to as "do-based minor", or starting on la (using "fi" and "si" for the raised sixth and seventh degrees). The latter (referred to as "la-based minor") is sometimes preferred in choral singing, especially with children.

The choice of which system is used for minor makes a difference as to how you handle modulations. In the first case ("do-based minor"), when the key moves for example from C major to C minor the syllable do keeps pointing to the same note, namely C, (there is no "mutation" of do's note), but when the key shifts from C major to A minor (or A major), the scale is transposed from do = C to do = A. In the second case ("la-based minor"), when the key moves from C major to A minor the syllable do continues to point to the same note, again C, but when the key moves from C major to C minor the scale is transposed from do = C to do = E♭.

Natural minor scale degree	Movable do solfège syllable (La-based minor)	Movable do solfège syllable (Do-based minor)
Lowered 1	Le (& Lo)	( Ti )
1	La	Do
Raised 1	Li	Di
Lowered 2	Te (& Ta)	Ra
2	Ti	Re
3	Do	Me (& Ma)
Raised 3	Di	Mi
Lowered 4	Ra	( Mi )
4	Re	Fa
Raised 4	Ri	Fi
Lowered 5	Me (& Ma)	Se
5	Mi	Sol
6	Fa	Le (& Lo)
Raised 6	Fi	La
Lowered 7	Se	( La )
7	Sol	Te (& Ta)
Raised 7	Si	Ti

=== Fixed do solfège ===
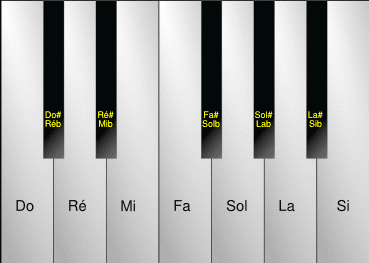
The names of the notes in Romance languages.

In Fixed do, each syllable always corresponds to the same pitch; when the music changes keys, each syllable continues to refer to the same pitch as it did before. This is analogous to the Romance-language system naming pitches after the solfège syllables, and is used in Romance and Slavic countries, among others, including Spanish-speaking countries.

From the Italian Renaissance, the debate over the superiority of instrumental music versus singing led Italian voice teachers to use Guido’s syllables for vocal technique rather than pitch discrimination. Hence, specific syllables were associated with fixed pitches. When the Paris Conservatoire was founded at the turn of the nineteenth century, its solfège textbooks adhered to the conventions of Italian solfeggio, solidifying the use of Fixed do in Romance cultures

In the major Romance and Slavic languages, the syllables Do, Re, Mi, Fa, Sol, La, and Si are the ordinary names of the notes, in the same way that the letters C, D, E, F, G, A, and B are used to name notes in English. For native speakers of these languages, solfège is simply singing the names of the notes, omitting any modifiers such as "sharp" or "flat" to preserve the rhythm. This system is called fixed do and is used in Belgium, Brazil, Spain, Portugal, France, Italy, Romania, Latin American countries and in French-speaking Canada as well as countries such as Russia, Turkey, Ukraine, Bulgaria and Israel where non-Romance languages are spoken. In the United States, the fixed-do system is taught at many conservatories and schools of music, including The Juilliard School in New York City, the Curtis Institute of Music in Philadelphia, the Eastman School of Music in Rochester, New York, the New England Conservatory of Music in Boston, Massachusetts, the San Francisco Conservatory of Music of Music in San Francisco, California, and the Cleveland Institute of Music in Cleveland, Ohio.

Traditional fixed do
Note name		Syllable	Pronunciation		Pitch class
English	Romance	Syllable	Anglicized	Italian	Pitch class
C♭	Do♭	do	/doʊ/	/dɔ/	11
C	Do	do	/doʊ/	/dɔ/	0
C♯	Do♯	do	/doʊ/	/dɔ/	1
D♭	Re♭	re	/ɹeɪ/	/rɛ/	1
D	Re	re	/ɹeɪ/	/rɛ/	2
D♯	Re♯	re	/ɹeɪ/	/rɛ/	3
E♭	Mi♭	mi	/miː/	/mi/	3
E	Mi	mi	/miː/	/mi/	4
E♯	Mi♯	mi	/miː/	/mi/	5
F♭	Fa♭	fa	/fɑː/	/fa/	4
F	Fa	fa	/fɑː/	/fa/	5
F♯	Fa♯	fa	/fɑː/	/fa/	6
G♭	Sol♭	sol	/soʊl/	/sɔl/	6
G	Sol	sol	/soʊl/	/sɔl/	7
G♯	Sol♯	sol	/soʊl/	/sɔl/	8
A♭	La♭	la	/lɑː/	/la/	8
A	La	la	/lɑː/	/la/	9
A♯	La♯	la	/lɑː/	/la/	10
B♭	Si♭	si	/siː/	/si/	10
B	Si	si	/siː/	/si/	11
B♯	Si♯	si	/siː/	/si/	0

In the fixed do system, shown above, accidentals do not affect the syllables used. For example, C, C♯, and C♭ (as well as C and C, not shown above) are all sung with the syllable "do".

==== Chromatic variants ====
Several chromatic fixed-do systems have also been devised to account for chromatic notes, and even for double-sharp and double-flat variants. The Yehnian system, being the first 24-EDO (i.e., quarter tone) solfège system, proposed even quartertonal syllables. While having no exceptions to its rules, it supports both si and ti users.

Chromatic variants of fixed do
Note name		Syllable								
English	Romance	Traditional	5 sharps, 5 flats	Hullah	Shearer	Siler	Latoni	Sotorrio	Yehnian (chromatic) (Si users / Ti users)	Pitch Class
C	Do	do	double da	duf	daw	du	Ka	(Pe)	Dɚ	10
C♭	Do♭	do	da	du	de	do	Ne	(Tsi)	Də	11
C	Do	do	do	do	do	da	Bi	Do	Do	0
C♯	Do♯	do	di	da	di	de	Ro	Ga	Du	1
C	Do	do	double di	das	dai	di	Tu	(Ray)	Dü	2
D	Re	re	double ra	raf	raw	ru	Be	(Do)	Rɚ	0
D♭	Re♭	re	ra	ra	ra	ro	Ri	Ga	Rə	1
D	Re	re	re	re	re	ra	To	Ray	Re	2
D♯	Re♯	re	ri	ri	ri	re	Mu	Nu	Ru	3
D	Re	re	double ri	ris	rai	ri	Ga	(Mi)	Rü	4
E	Mi	mi	double me	mef	maw	mu	Ti	(Ray)	Mɚ	2
E♭	Mi♭	mi	me	me	me	mo	Mo	Nu	Mə	3
E	Mi	mi	mi	mi	mi	ma	Gu	Mi	Mi	4
E♯	Mi♯	mi	my	mis	mai	me	Sa	(Fa)	Mu	5
E	Mi	mi	double my	mish	mu	mi	Pe	(Jur)	Mü	6
F	Fa	fa	–	fof	faw	fu	Mi	(Nu)	Fɚ	3
F♭	Fa♭	fa	–	fo	fe	fo	Go	(Mi)	Fə	4
F	Fa	fa	fa	fa	fa	fa	Su	Fa	Fa	5
F♯	Fa♯	fa	fi	fe	fi	fe	Pa	Jur	Fu	6
F	Fa	fa	–	fes	fai	fi	Le	(Sol)	Fü	7
G	Sol	sol	–	sulf	saw	su	So	(Fa)	Sɚl / Sɚ	5
G♭	Sol♭	sol	se	sul	se	so	Pu	Jur	Səl / Sə	6
G	Sol	sol	sol	sol	so	sa	La	Sol	Sol	7
G♯	Sol♯	sol	si	sal	si	se	De	Ki	Sul / Su	8
G	Sol	sol	–	sals	sai	si	Fi	(La)	Sül / Sü	9
A	La	la	–	lof	law	lu	Lu	(Sol)	Lɚ	7
A♭	La♭	la	le	lo	le	lo	Da	Ki	Lə	8
A	La	la	la	la	la	la	Fe	La	La	9
A♯	La♯	la	li	le	li	le	Ki	Pe	Lu	10
A	La	la	–	les	lai	li	No	(Tsi)	Lü	11
B	Si	si	–	sef	taw	tu	Fa	(La)	Sɚ / Tɚ	9
B♭	Si♭	si	te	se	te	to	Ke	Pe	Sə / Tə	10
B	Si	si	ti	si	ti	ta	Ni	Tsi	Si / Ti	11
B♯	Si♯	si	–	sis	tai	te	Bo	(Do)	Su / Tu	0
B	Si	si	–	sish	–	ti	Ru	(Ga)	Sü / Tü	1
A dash ("–") means that the source(s) did not specify a syllable.

== Note names ==
In the countries with fixed-do, these seven syllables (with "si" rather than "ti") – and not the letters C, D, E, F, G, A, and B – are used to name the notes of the C-Major scale. Here it would be said, for example, that Beethoven's Ninth Symphony (in D minor) is in "Re minor", and that its third movement (in B♭ major) is in "Si-bemol major".

In Germanic countries, on the other hand, the notes have letter names that are mainly the same as those used in English (so that Beethoven's Ninth Symphony is said to be in "d-Moll"), and solfège syllables are encountered only in sight-singing and ear training.

== Hand symbols ==
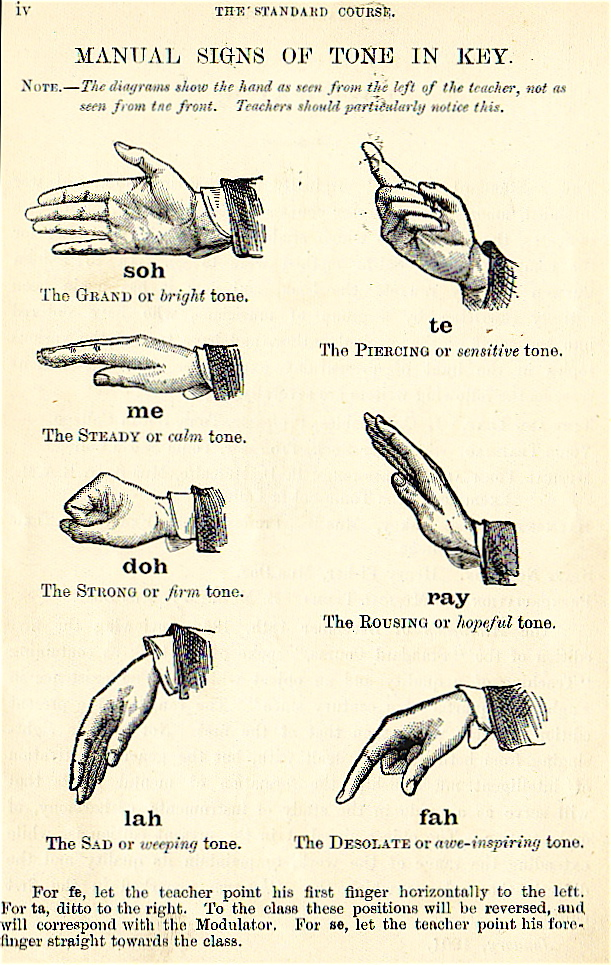
Curwen Hand Signs

Each solfège syllable — Do, Re, Mi, Fa, Sol, La, Ti — additionally has its own hand shape and position. As the notes get higher, the hand signs generally move higher too.

The hand signs commonly used today are known as Curwen hand signs, after the 19th-century English music educator John Curwen. They were later incorporated into the Kodály method of music education.

== Cultural references ==
- The various possibilities to distinguish the notes acoustically, optically and by ways of speech and signs, made the solfège a possible syllabary for an International Auxiliary Language (IAL/LAI). This was, in the latter half of the 19th century, realised in the musical language Solresol.
- In The Sound of Music, the song "Do-Re-Mi" (also known by its first line "Doe, a deer, a female deer") is built around solfège. Maria sings it with the von Trapp children to teach them to sing the major scale.
- Ernie Kovacs' television show had a popular recurring sketch that became known as "The Nairobi Trio". The three characters wore long overcoats, bowler hats, and gorilla masks, and were performed by Ernie and two other rotating persons including uncredited stars such as Frank Sinatra and Jack Lemmon, as well as Kovacs' wife, singer Edie Adams. There was no dialog, the three pantomimed to the song Solfeggio by Robert Maxwell and the lyrics of the song were made up solely of the solfeggio syllables themselves. The sketch was so popular, that the song was re-released as "Song of the Nairobi Trio".

== See also ==
- Sargam – Note in the octave (Indian classical music)
- Key signature names and translations – Translation of musical keys
- Numbered musical notation – Musical notation system used in Asia since the 19th century
- Vocable – Meaningful sound uttered by people
