= Do-Re-Mi =

Song
- Released: 1959 in The Sound of Music
- Genre: Show tune, Classical
- Composer: Richard Rodgers
- Lyricist: Oscar Hammerstein II

"Do-Re-Mi" is a show tune from the 1959 Rodgers and Hammerstein musical The Sound of Music. Each syllable of the musical solfège system appears in the song's lyrics, sung on the pitch it names. Rodgers was helped in its creation by long-time arranger Trude Rittmann who devised the extended vocal sequence in the song.

The tune finished at #88 in AFI's 100 Years...100 Songs survey of the top tunes in American cinema in 2004.

== Background ==
In The Sound of Music, the song is used by the governess Maria to teach the solfège of the major scale to the Von Trapp children, who are learning to sing for the first time. According to assistant conductor Peter Howard, the heart of the number—in which Maria assigns a musical tone to each child, like so many Swiss bell ringers—was devised in rehearsal by Rittmann (who was credited for choral arrangements) and choreographer Joe Layton. The fourteen note and tune lyric—"when you know the notes to sing..."—were provided by Rodgers and Hammerstein; the rest, apparently, came from Rittmann. According to Howard, "Rodgers allowed her to do whatever she liked. When we started doing the staging of it, Joe took over. He asked Trude for certain parts to be repeated, certain embellishments." Versions by Anita Bryant and Mitch Miller were co-charted in Canada, reaching #13 on February 22, 1960.

In the stage version, Maria sings the song in the living room of Captain von Trapp's house shortly after she introduces herself to the children. However, when Ernest Lehman adapted the stage script into a screenplay for the 1965 film adaptation, he moved the song to later on in the story. In the film, Maria and the children sing this song over a montage as they wander and frolic over Salzburg. This version peaked at #1 in Philippines.

== Word meanings ==
(For the actual origins of the solfège, refer to Solfège.)

The lyrics teach the solfège syllables by linking them with English homophones (or near-homophones):

1. Doe: "a deer, a female deer" refers to the first solfège syllable, do.
2. Ray: "a drop of golden sun" refers to the second solfège syllable, re.
3. Me: "a name I call myself" refers to the third solfège syllable, mi.
4. Far: "a long, long way to run" refers to the fourth solfège syllable, fa.
5. Sew: "a needle pulling thread" refers to the fifth solfège syllable, sol or so.
6. La: "a note to follow so" refers to the sixth solfège syllable, la.
7. Tea: "a drink with jam and bread" refers to the seventh and final solfège syllable, ti.

As the song concludes, "When you know the notes to sing, you can sing most anything."

Author Douglas Adams noted in his article "Unfinished Business of the Century" that, while each line of the lyric takes the name of a note from the solfège scale, and gives its meaning, "La, a note to follow So..." does not fit that pattern and imagines it was likely a placeholder that was never replaced. Adams humorously imagined that Oscar Hammerstein just wrote "a note to follow So" and thought he would have another look at it later, but could not come up with anything better. Far and Fa are homophones in some non-rhotic accents of the English language.

== Foreign language versions ==
Since the song features wordplay with English words that sound like the solfège syllables, foreign versions of the song do not translate the English lyrics. Instead, they use the local solfège and associate each syllable with a meaning in the native language. In most countries, the note B is represented by si instead of ti.

=== Austrian version with letters ===
When The Sound of Music was translated to German in 2005 for the Vienna Volksoper, the song "Do-Re-Mi" was rewritten as "C wie Cellophanpapier". The solfège syllables were replaced with the letters C through H, (Note: H is German letter notation for the English note B.) and the mnemonics were words that began with each letter. However, when the musical finally premiered in its setting of Salzburg in 2011, it was performed with a German version of Do-Re-Mi that kept the solfège.

== See also ==
- Alphabet song
- Musical scale
- Solresol
