= Tonic sol-fa =

System of musical notation

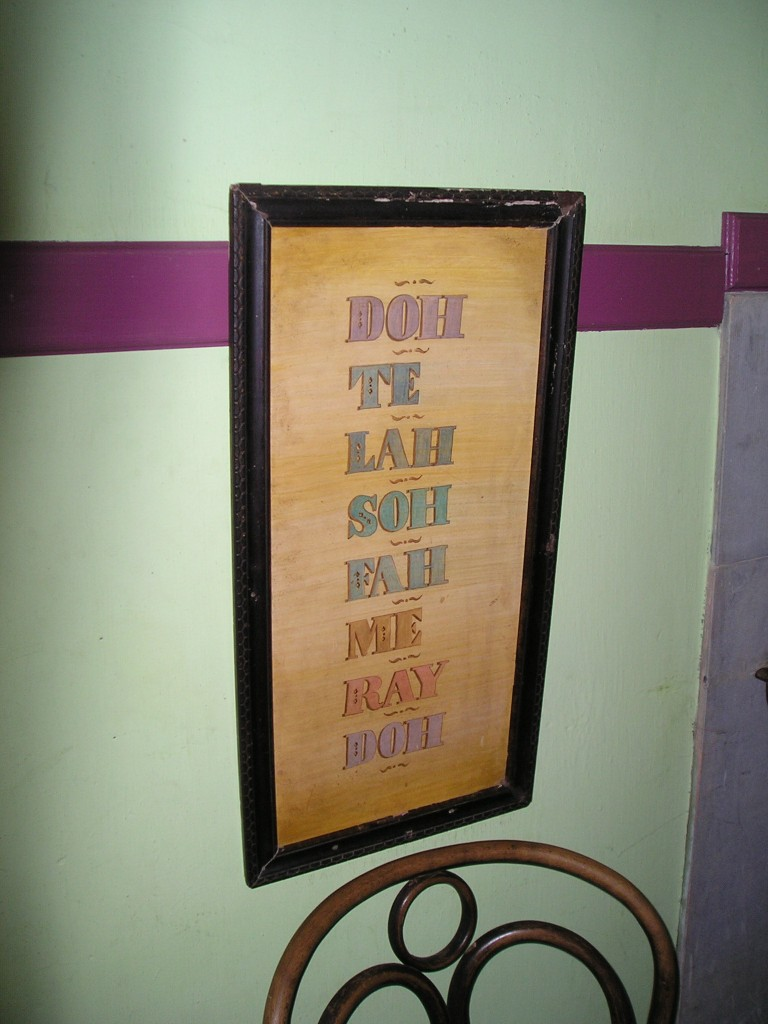
Solfège table in an Irish classroom

Tonic sol-fa (or tonic sol-fah) is a pedagogical technique for teaching sight-singing, invented by Sarah Anna Glover (1786–1867) of Norwich, England and popularised by John Curwen, who adapted it from a number of earlier musical systems. It uses a system of musical notation based on movable do solfège, whereby every note is given a name according to its relationship with other notes in the key: the usual staff notation is replaced with anglicized solfège syllables (e.g. the syllable la for the submediant) or their abbreviations (l for la). "Do" is chosen to be the tonic of whatever key is being used (thus the terminology moveable Do in contrast to the fixed Do system used by John Pyke Hullah). The original solfège sequence started with "Ut", the first syllable of the hymn Ut queant laxis, which later became "Do".

== Overview ==
Glover developed her method in Norwich from 1812, resulting in the "Norwich Sol-fa Ladder" which she used to teach children to sing. She published her work in the Manual of the Norwich Sol-fa System (1845) and Tetrachordal System (1850).

Curwen was commissioned by a conference of Sunday school teachers in 1841 to find and promote a way of teaching music for Sunday school singing. He took elements of the Norwich Sol-fa and other techniques later adding hand signals. It was intended that his method could teach singing initially from the Sol-fa and then a transition to staff notation.

Curwen brought out his Grammar of Vocal Music in 1843, and in 1853 started the Tonic Sol-Fa Association. The Standard Course of Lessons on the Tonic Sol-fa Method of Teaching to Sing was published in 1858.

In 1872, Curwen changed his former course of using the Sol-fa system as an aid to sight reading, when that edition of his Standard Course of Lessons excluded the staff and relied solely on Tonic Sol-fa.

In 1879 the Tonic Sol-Fa College was opened. Curwen also began publishing, and brought out a periodical called the Tonic Sol-fa Reporter and Magazine of Vocal Music for the People, and in his later life was occupied in directing the spreading organisation of his system. The Sol-fa system was widely adopted for use in education, as an easily teachable method in the reading of music at sight, but its more ambitious aims for providing a superior method of musical notation have not been generally adopted.

By the end of the nineteenth century, this notation was very widespread in Britain, and it became standard practice to sell sheet music (for popular songs) with the tonic sol-fa notation included.

Some of the roots of tonic sol-fa may be found in items such as:

- the use of syllables in the 11th century by the monk Guido de Arezzo
- the cipher notation proposed by Jean-Jacques Rousseau in France in 1746,
- its further development by Pierre Galin and popularization by Aimé Paris and Emile Chevé, and
- the Norwich sol-fa of Sarah Ann Glover of England. Reverend John Curwen (1816–1880) was instrumental in the development of tonic sol-fa in England, and was chiefly responsible for its popularity.
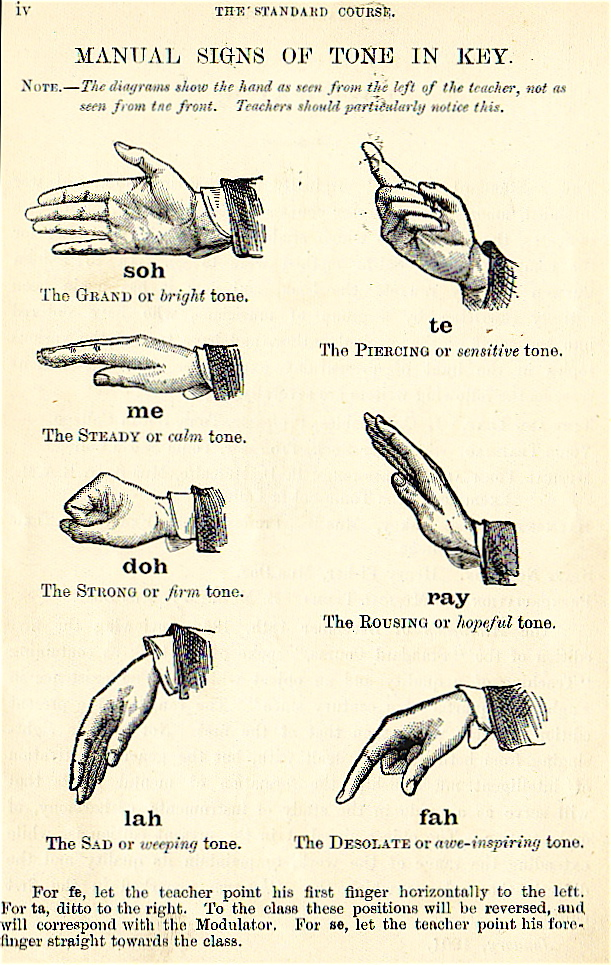
  Depiction of Curwen's Solfege hand signs. This version includes the tonal tendencies and interesting titles for each tone.
  William Gray McNaught (1849-1918) helped build its popularity in schools.

When John Windet printed the 1594 edition of the Sternhold and Hopkins Psalter, he added the initials of the six syllables of Guido (U, R, M, F, S, L) underneath the note. Windet explained, "...I have caused a new print of note to be made with letter to be joined to every note: whereby thou mayest know how to call every note by his right name, so that with a very little diligence thou mayest more easilie by the viewing of these letters, come to the knowledge of perfect solfeying..." Rousseau, Curwen and others would have been aware of this popular psalter.

B. C. Unseld and Theodore F. Seward, with Biglow and Main publishers, imported Curwen's tonic sol-fa to the United States, though the method was never widely received. Before this, the 9th edition of the Bay Psalm Book (Boston, USA) had appeared with the initials of four-note syllables (fa, sol, la, me) underneath the staff. Reverend John Tufts, in his An Introduction to the Singing of Psalm Tunes in a Plaine & Easy Method, moved the initials of the four-note syllables onto the staff in place of "regular notes", and indicated rhythm by punctuation marks to the right of the letters. These may be considered American forerunners of Curwen's system, though he may not have been aware of them. Tufts' Introduction was popular, going through several editions. Nevertheless, his work probably did more to pave the way for shape notes. When Unseld and Steward introduced tonic sol-fa in the late 1800s, it was considered "something new".

In 1972 Roberto Goitre printed one of the most important modern versions of the method in Cantar Leggendo with the moveable Do.

Solmization that represents the functions of pitches (such as tonic sol-fa) is called "functional" solmization. All musicians that use functional solmization use "do" to represent the tonic (also known as the "keynote") in the major mode. However, approaches to the minor mode fall into two camps. Some musicians use "do" to represent the tonic in minor (a parallel approach), whereas others prefer to label the tonic in minor as "la" (a relative approach) Both systems have their advantages: The former system more directly represents the scale-degree functions of the pitches in a key; the latter more directly represents the intervals between pitches in any given key signature.

== Notation ==
In Curwen's system, the notes of the major scale (of any key) are notated with the single letters d, r, m, f, s, l, and t when in the octave of middle C (or C4). This means, no extra notation will be added to any of the notes when do is anywhere between C4 - B4. Any notes in the octave(s) above will have a superscript, starting with 1 for the first octave above, 2 for the second, so on and so forth, if it were ever necessary. The same goes for the octave(s) below, except it will be notated with a subscript instead. To reference these when talking about them, in the case of do, do^{1} would be called "one-do", and do_{1} is called "do-one". Chromatic alterations are marked by the following vowel, "e" for sharp (pronounced "ee") and "a" for flat (pronounced "aw"). Thus, the ascending and descending chromatic scale is notated:

d de r re m f fe s se l le t d1
d1 t ta l la s sa f m ma r ra d

Such chromatic notes appear only as ornaments or as preparation for a modulation; once the music has modulated, then the names for the new key are used. The modulation itself is marked by superscript of the old note name preceding its new name; for example, in modulation to the dominant, the new tonic is notated as ^{s}d. The music then proceeds in the new key until another modulation is notated.

Minor keys use l (la) as the tonic. The ascending sixth scale degree in melodic minor is noted as ba (pronounced "bay") instead of fe, which is reserved for the sharp f of the major scale.

Dynamic symbols are used the same as in the staff notation more commonly seen. A horizontal line under a single letter means that note is to be sung legato, or smooth. A horizontal line spanning under multiple letters signifies a slur, connecting the letters together. In Curwen's Tonic sol-fa, time signatures are not used, so various forms of notation are used to divide up measures into beats and beats smaller. Vertical bar lines are used to separate measures, like in the more commonly seen staff notation. A double bar line at the end also signifies the end. Colons (:) are then used to separate the beats:

|d:r||

In compound meters, such as 6/8, a shorter vertical line is to divide the measure into the strong beats called medium accents:

|d:r:m|d:r:m||

Dashes in place of a letter means to hold out the note until either the next note appears, a rest appears, or the end of the piece comes, whichever may come first. Rests are just notated with a blank space; no letter, no dash:

|d:-|s: ||

Periods, or full stops, (.) are used to separate a beat in half. To further divide the beat into quarters, commas (,) are used:

|d:d.r|d,r.m,f:s||

Dotted note values can be shown in a couple ways. A dash can be used, or putting a ".," next to the following note can work as well:

|d.-,m:s1|| or |d .,m:s1||

For triplets, an inverted comma (_{'}) is used:

|d'r'm:d'r'm||

== Examples ==
- The "conversation" between humans and the just-arrived aliens depicted towards the end of the Steven Spielberg motion picture Close Encounters of the Third Kind, which features the iconic five-tone aural motif from the film, uses hand signals which correspond to rey, me, doh, doh (again, but a full octave lower), and soh from Curwen's Solfège, as depicted in the chart Manual Signs of Tone and Key shown above.
