= Silvana Di Lotti =

Italian composer (born 1942)

Silvana Di Lotti (born 29 November 1942) is an Italian pianist, lecturer and composer. She was born in Agliè, Turin, and studied in Turin and Salzburg with Roberto Goitre, Amalia Pierangeli Mussato and Giorgio Ferrari, and in Siena with Luciano Berio and Pierre Boulez. After completing her studies, she took a position teaching at the Turin Conservatory. She won the Alfano Prize at the Turin Conservatory, and the Ancona Prize for woodwind composition.

== Life ==
Silvana Di Lotti was born in Agliè Canavese in Turin on 29 November 1942. She studied piano in Turin with Amalia Pierangeli Mussato and composition with Giorgio Ferrari. She then studied in the summer school in Salzburg with Kurt Leimer, and then at the Accademia Musicale Chigiana in Siena with Luciano Berio, Franco Evangelisti, Luis de Pablo, Pierre Boulez. and Roberto Goitre. Di Lotti was awarded the Alfano prize at the Turin Conservatory. She also won the Ancona Prize in the Tenth International Competition for woodwind instruments in 1980, with a piece for oboe and piano. That work was then performed in Pavia and in the former Soviet Union in Leningrad and Riga. In 1985 Di Lotti won the Lobende Anerkennung at the International Composition Competition in Mannheim.

After completing her studies, she took a position teaching harmony and counterpoint at the Turin Conservatory. She has also taught at the A. Vivaldi Conservatory in Alessandria. Di Lotti's compositions have been performed at major music festivals in Europe.

== Works ==
Selected works include:

- Woodland Flute Call for flute
- A Medieval Minstrelsy , suite for pipe organ, voice and piano
- Duo In Eco for violin and guitar
