= Nanine Paris =

French music theorist (1800–1868)

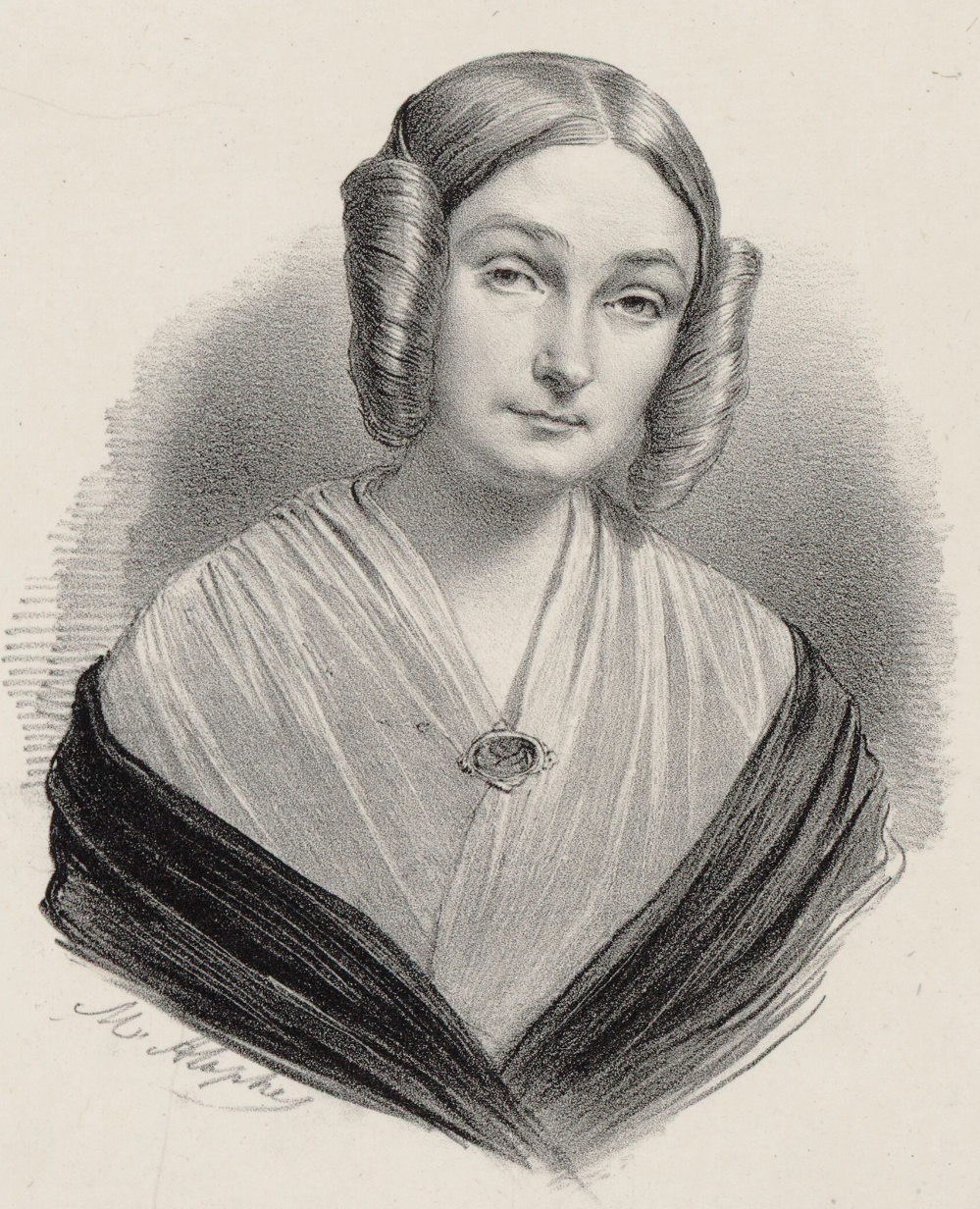
Nanine Paris

Nanine Paris Chevé (25 May 1800 – 28 June 1868) was a French music theorist and author. Along with her husband Émile-Joseph-Maurice Chevé and brother Aimé Paris, she developed a music notation system known as Galin-Paris-Chevé system, which also called as Time-Names System.

== Biography ==
Born as Nanine Elisabeth on 25 May 1800 in Quimper, France, Nanine Paris was the daughter of Amant Paris and Corentine Charlotte Vacherot. She showed interest on the musical ideas of Pierre Galin. She worked on the practical aspects of the musical ideas of Pierre Galin. With the help of her brother Aimé Paris, she put the musical theories of Pierre Galin into more practical through teaching the rhythm notation with use of time-value system.

In 1839, she married French music theorist and music teacher Émile-Joseph-Maurice Chevé who was the student of Aimé Paris.

A musical notation system, known as Galin-Paris-Chevé method, was jointly developed by her along with her husband and brother. In collaboration with her husband, she later published two important musical works, Elementary Method of Vocal Music (1844) and Elementary Method of Harmony in two parts (1845 and 1846).

She died on 28 June 1868 in Bois-Colombes, Paris.
