= Kodály Seminar =

The International Kodály Seminar was named after the famous Hungarian musician, Zoltán Kodály, who was a composer, pedagogue, ethnomusicologist. He is well-known around the world as the creator of a music method: Kodály method. Foreign musicians from all over the world come to see his birthplace, Kecskemét to get some inspiration, learn his method for a better pedagogy and listen to Hungarian choirs and concerts. These are the main points for musicians to visit Kecskemét, Bács-Kiskun county.

== History ==
1970 was the year when the name and the event was born. Zoltán Kodály’s widow and the primary and secondary Kodály school’s director, Márta Nemesszeghyné Szentkirályi had an idea about an international summer course. For their initiation the city advertised this course for learning the Hungarian music teaching in schools and the method’s basics. A lot of people interested in this course, so after two years the International Kodály Seminar was held again, second time. The first was in 1970 and the second, two years later, in 1972.

Since 1975, the Kodály Institute of the Liszt Ferenc Academy was active, they started organising the third Kodály Seminar. /The Seminar is organized every second year. An International Music Festival is also held at the same time./ While the first two courses’ main goal was for foreign professional musicians and was about the school teaching in music schools, since 1975 there was a big change, because they wanted to make the courses interesting for the Hungarian pedagogues too.

Their programmes, variations of opportunities was also motivating for the Hungarian audience. The aim of the Kodály Seminars was that: refreshing the possibilities, abilities to help the music teachers, conductors in their daily work. Kodály Seminar became year by year a voluntary self-education course; how to be a “good musician” and the human and professional music symbol.

Nowadays the aim of these courses is the comprehensive demonstration of the Hungarian music education in practical and pedagogical works, Kodály’s and Bartók’s lifework. The programme consists of daily conducting lessons, solfege lessons, methodology classes, choral singing and concerts.

In 1987 with the Seminar the International Kodály Symposium was held; a new summer programme started. Workshops were in different topics: folk music, music analysis.

The 20th International Kodály Seminar was held in 1999 which was the Jubilee of the tradition since 1970.

There have been approximately 2200 participants from 42 different countries during the Seminars.

In this year (17-28 July 2017) will be the 29th International Kodaly Seminar with a lot of programmes and concerts.
