= John Curwen =

English minister and diffuser of the tonic sol-fa system of music education

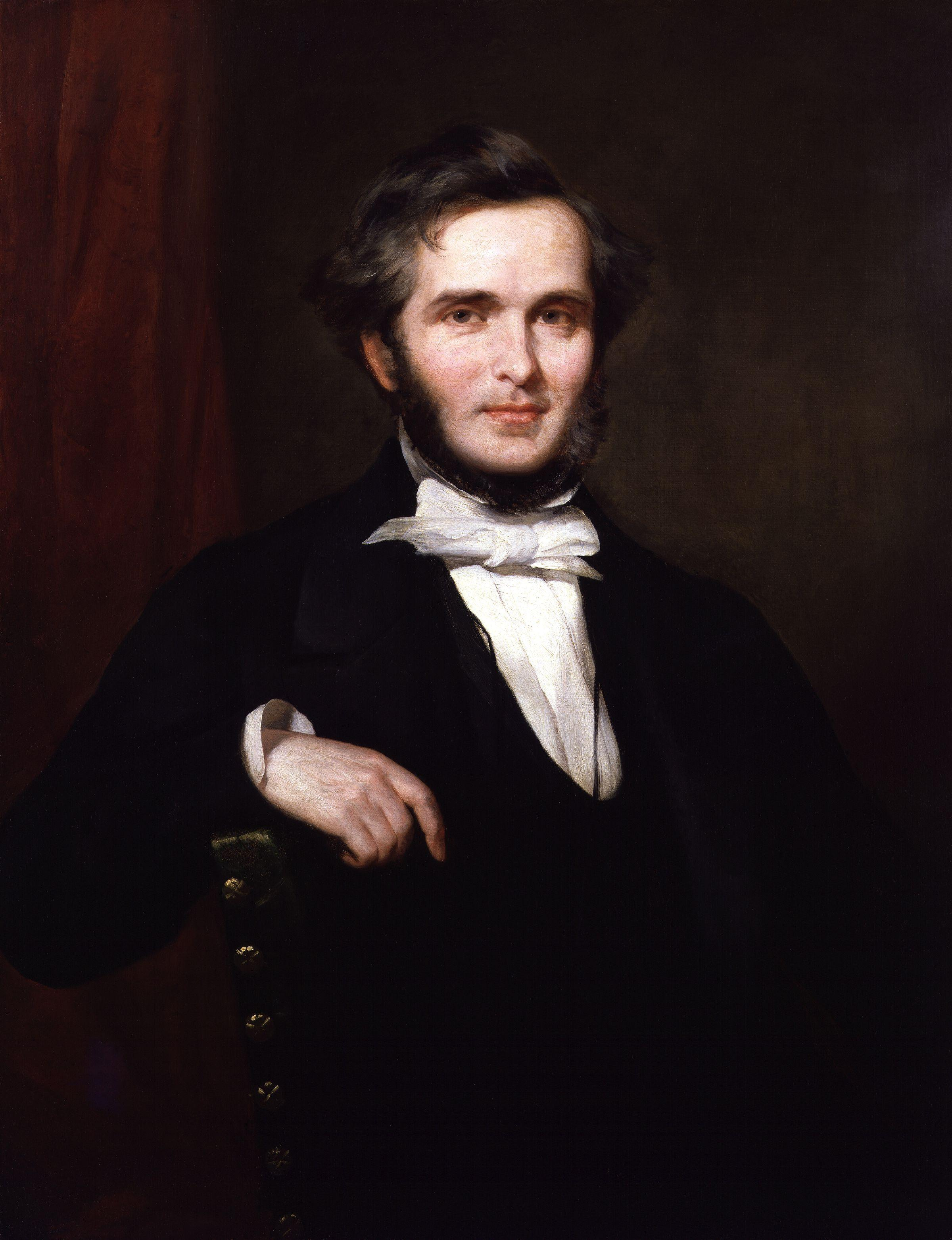
Portrait of John Curwen by William Gush, circa 1857

John Curwen (14 November 1816 – 26 May 1880) was an English Congregationalist minister and diffuser of the tonic sol-fa system of music education created by Sarah Ann Glover. He was educated at Wymondley College in Hertfordshire, then Coward College as that institution became known when it moved to London, and finally University College London.

== Background and biography ==
John Curwen was a descendant of the Curwens of Workington Hall in Cumbria, one of the oldest families in England, the male line proper being a direct descent from Eldred, a pre-Norman Englishman, whose son Ketel held lands in the Barony of Kendal. Orm, Ketel's son, inherited the Cumbrian manor of Workington.

Curwen was born 14 November 1816, at Heckmondwike, West Riding of Yorkshire, the son of Spedding Curwen and Mary Jubb. His father was a Non-conformist minister, as John was also from 1838 until 1864. Curwen gave up full-time ministry to devote himself to his new method of musical nomenclature.

He established the Tonic Sol-Fa Press in Plaistow, where he had been a minister, and in 1879 the Tonic Sol-Fa college (later the Forest Gate School of Music) in Forest Gate.

Curwen married Mary Thompson (1816–1890) in May 1845. They had four children – Margaret, John Spencer, Spedding and Thomas Herbert. Curwen died at Heaton Mersey, Stockport on 26 May 1880. His son John Spencer married Annie Jessy Gregg, who went on to write the extensive and influential series Mrs. Curwen's Pianoforte Method based on her adaptation for the piano of John Curwen's method for voice.

== Tonic sol-fa ==
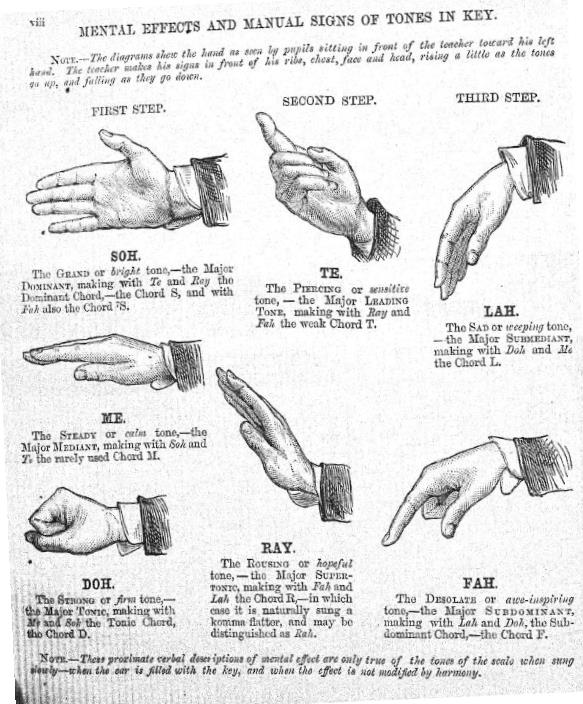
Curwen's Solfege hand signs, including "mental effects" for each tone.

Curwen's system was designed to aid in sight reading of the stave with its lines and spaces. He adapted it from a number of earlier musical systems, including the Norwich Sol-fa method of Sarah Ann Glover (1785–1867) of Norwich. Her Sol-fa system was based on the ancient gamut; but she omitted the constant recital of the alphabetical names of each note and the arbitrary syllable indicating key relationship, and also the recital of two or more such syllables when the same note was common to as many keys (e.g. C, Fa, Ut, meaning that C is the subdominant of G and the tonic of C). The notes were represented by the initials of the seven syllables, still in use in Italy and France as their names. Curwen taught himself to sight-read based on Glover's Norwich Sol-fa, made alterations and improvements, and named his method Tonic Sol-fa. In the Tonic Sol-fa the seven letters refer to key relationship (relative pitch) and not to absolute pitch. Curwen utilised the first letter (lower case) of each of the solmisation tones (do, re, me, fa, sol, la, ti), and a rhythmic system that used bar lines (prefixing strong beats), half bar lines (prefixing medium beats), and semicolons (prefixing weak beats) in each measure.

Curwen felt the need for a simple way of teaching how to sing by note through his experiences among Sunday school teachers. Stemming from his religious and social beliefs, Curwen thought that music should be easily accessible to all classes and ages of people. Apart from Glover, similar ideas had been elaborated in France by Pierre Galin (1786–1821), Aimé Paris (1798–1866) and Emile Chevé (1804–1864), whose method of teaching how to read at sight (the Galin-Paris-Chevé system) also depended on the principle of tonic relationship being taught by the reference of every sound to its tonic, and by the use of a numeric notation. Curwen adapted French time names from Paris' Langue de durées.

== Curwen's publications ==
Curwen brought out his Grammar of Vocal Music in 1843, and in 1853 started the Tonic Sol-Fa Association. The Standard Course of Lessons on the Tonic Sol-fa Method of Teaching to Sing was published in 1858. In 1879 the Tonic Sol-Fa College was opened. Curwen also began publishing, and brought out a periodical called the Tonic Sol-fa Reporter and Magazine of Vocal Music for the People, and in his later life was occupied in directing the spreading organisation of his system. With his son, John Spencer Curwen (1847–1916) who later became principal of the Tonic Sol-Fa College, Curwen incorporated the J. Curwen & Sons publishing firm in 1863. This firm continued as the Curwen Press into the 1970s, when it was closed. The Sol-fa system was widely adopted for use in education, as an easily teachable method in the reading of music at sight, but its more ambitious aims for providing a superior method of musical notation have not been generally adopted. In 1872, Curwen changed his former course of using the Sol-fa system as an aid to sight reading, when that edition of his Standard Course of Lessons excluded the staff and relied solely on Curwen's Tonic Sol-fa system.

Curwen technically did not invent Tonic Sol-fa. Rather he developed a distinct method of applying it in music education, including both rhythm and pitch. The name and current form can be traced to Curwen.

== Works ==
- A Tonic Sol-fa Primer
- The Teacher's Manual of the Tonic Sol-fa Method
- Grammar of Vocal Music
- Musical Theory
- Musical Statics

== Memorial ==
Curwen is remembered in Heckmondwike with a memorial in the Green Park and by the John Curwen Cooperative Primary, by Curwen Primary School in Plaistow, London, and by Curwen Crescent, and in 2007 a new housing development in the north of the town was named Curwen Park.

== See also ==
- Psalmist movement
- Shape note
- Solfege
