= Mario Pigazzini =

Italian conductor

Mario Pigazzini was a director for the Coro Polifonico Farnesiano, in Piacenza, Italy. He took over the reins of the choir in 1981, following the untimely death of Roberto Goitre the previous year. Pigazzini had been taught by Goitre and, since his appointment as director, has been using and developing Goitre's teaching method, called "Cantar Leggendo", which is similar to the Kodály Method.

Pigazzini established a three-year preparation course for children wishing to enter the Children's Choir and a course for members of the Adult Choir who want to develop their music reading skills. He also created a Youth Choir for girls between the ages of 15 and 23 and an instrumental ensemble to accompany the choirs where necessary.

Furthermore, Pigazzini makes regular trips around Italy and Europe giving masterclasses on the Cantar Leggendo method, with his destinations including Greece, France, Germany, Andorra, Spain, Portugal, Switzerland and Belgium. He was also Professor of Choral Music at Piacenza's "Giuseppe Nicolini" Conservatoire until he retired in 2010.
