= Conrad Wilhelm Mayer =

German music educator (1931–2012)

Conrad Wilhelm Mayer (28 June 1931 – 18 June 2012) was a German music educator, choral conductor and composer. He founded the German Kodály Society in 1972 and promoted Kodály-based classroom singing in Germany. In addition to his work in music education, Mayer drew extensively, with exhibitions of his pen drawings shown in Breisach am Rhein.

== Life and education ==
Mayer was born in Freiburg im Breisgau, Germany, to Wilhelm Hugo Mayer, a teacher and writer, and Katharina, daughter of the St. Gallen stonemason Aulfinger. As a boy he sang soprano in the St. Konrad boys’ choir in Konstanz and took private lessons with the Lake Constance painters Gertrudis Endres and Otto Marquardt. He later studied philosophy and theology with training in Gregorian chant, followed by music education (voice and violin emphasis).

=== Career in music education ===
Mayer taught music at Gymnasien (selective academic secondary schools) in Staufen, Lörrach, Emmendingen, Freiburg and Kirchzarten. He also worked as a composer, conductor, choir director and singer. In 1988 he co-led practical courses on Kodály-inspired classroom choral teaching at the 17th Bundesschulmusikwoche (National School Music Week).

A 1993 feature in the Badische Zeitung profiled Mayer as an advocate of Kodály-based “democratisation of music” and noted his long service as a school music teacher as well as his leadership role in the German Kodály Society.

=== German Kodály Society ===
Mayer founded the German Kodály Society (Deutsche Kodály-Gesellschaft) in 1972; the society later ceased activities for a period and was re-established in July 2011 in Weinstadt, near Stuttgart. In the founding year, Emmendingen hosted the “Emmendinger Musiktage,” a multi-day event featuring Hungarian music educators (including Erzsébet Szőnyi); a contemporary account credited Mayer, then a senior teacher at the local Gymnasium, with initiating both the society and the festival.

=== Publications ===
Mayer authored Der Relative Weg: Die Kodály-Methode im deutschen Musikunterricht (2nd expanded ed., 1980), a teachers’ handbook adapting the Kodály Concept for German school music. He also published Erzähl- und Spiellieder zum gemeinsamen Musizieren von Kindern und Erwachsenen (2003), a collection of ten children’s songs with didactic suggestions and an accompanying CD; the book was reviewed by music educator Hubert Minkenberg.

Mayer’s account of the German Kodály Society's history was published as Der lange Weg einer guten Sache: 30 Jahre Deutsche Kodály-Gesellschaft e.V. (2002).

=== Artwork and exhibitions ===
From 1994, with a brief interruption, Mayer lived for about a decade in Breisach am Rhein and took part in cultural and educational projects there. His drawings—often steel-pen depictions of Breisach—were exhibited locally in 1996 and 2001; in 2011 the Museum of City History in the Rheintor mounted a small birthday exhibition of his works with Breisach motifs.

Mayer died on 18 June 2012 at the age of 80.

== Selected works ==
- Der Relative Weg: Die Kodály-Methode im deutschen Musikunterricht. 2nd expanded ed. Self-published, 1980. (in German).
- Der lange Weg einer guten Sache: 30 Jahre Deutsche Kodály-Gesellschaft e.V. Self-published, 2002. (in German).
- Erzähl- und Spiellieder zum gemeinsamen Musizieren von Kindern und Erwachsenen. Freiburg: Lambertus, 2003. ISBN 978-3-7841-1479-8. (in German).
