= Coro Polifonico Farnesiano =

The Coro Polifonico Farnesiano is a choir based in Piacenza, Italy. It was founded in 1976 by Roberto Goitre, and since the aforementioned choirmaster's death in 1980, has been conducted by Mario Pigazzini.
