= Forest Gate School of Music =

Music school in London, England (1885-194?)

Coordinates: 51.5486°N 0.0221°E

The Forest Gate School of Music (later the Metropolitan Academy of Music) was established in 1885 by Harding Bonner (1853-1907). It was situated in premises on what is now Earlham Grove in Forest Gate, London. The building dates from 1879 and was previously the premises of the Tonic Sol-Fa College, established there by the pioneering music educator John Curwen. In 1897 the Earlham Hall was added to the front of the property as a public performance space seating around 500 people. The buildings of the school still stand, although somewhat altered as the Cherubim and Seraphim Church.

== Early years ==
In 1904 the Forest Gate School of Music, together with the London Organ School and College of Music amalgamated with the London Academy of Music. In 1906, the Forest Gate School of Music was renamed the Metropolitan Academy of Music. In 1907 the Metropolitan Academy of Music's relationship with the London Academy of Music was terminated.

The Metropolitan Academy of Music is the new title of the music schools founded by Mr. W. Harding Bonner at Forest Gate in 1885, with branches at Ilford, Leytonstone and Southend. In 1904 these schools were amalgamated with the London Academy of Music, but by mutual arrangement this connection has been terminated, and Mr. Bonner and his son, Mr. Frank Bonner, will confine their energies to The Metropolitan Academy of Music.

== Rise and fall ==
After Harding Bonner's death - on 26 April 1907 following surgery at the London Hospital - his son, Frank took over the college and expanded it so that in 1916 it boasted 12 branches throughout London and Essex, with a membership of about 2,300 students. After World War I, this rose to 5,000 – peaking at 5,600 in 1926 – the largest music institution in the country at the time.

By the 1920s the Academy also had premises at 72-74 Marylebone High Street, London, W1.

The Academy finally closed during the Second World War.
