= Gongche notation =

Traditional Chinese musical notation

Chinese name
- Traditional Chinese: 工尺譜
- Simplified Chinese: 工尺谱
Transcriptions
Standard Mandarin
- Hanyu Pinyin: gōng chě pǔ
Yue: Cantonese
- Jyutping: gung1 ce1 pou2

Vietnamese name
- Vietnamese alphabet: hệ thống Hò Xự Xang
- Hán-Nôm: 系統合四上

Gongche notation or gongchepu is a traditional musical notation method, once popular in ancient China. It uses Chinese characters to represent musical notes. It was named after two of the Chinese characters that were used to represent musical notes, namely "工" gōng and "尺" chě.

Sheet music written in this notation is still used for traditional Chinese musical instruments and Chinese operas. However usage of the notation has declined, replaced by mostly jianpu (numbered musical notation) and sometimes the standard western notation.

The notation usually uses a movable "do" system. There are variations of the character set used for musical notes. A commonly accepted set is shown below with its relation to jianpu and solfege.

Gongche	上 shàng	尺 chě	工 gōng	凡 fán	六 liù	五 wǔ	乙 yǐ
Scale degree	1	2	3	(4)	5	6	(7)
Solfège	do	re	mi	(between fa and fa♯)	sol	la	between ti♭ and ti)
Simplified Japanese	ル	人	フ	り	久	ゐ	𠃊

== Usual variations ==
The three notes just below the central octave are usually represented by special characters:

Gongche	合 hé	四 sì	一 yī
Jianpu	5̣	6̣	(7̣)
Solfege	sol	la	(between ti♭ and ti)
Simplified Japanese notation	ム	マ	ㄧ

Sometimes "士" shì is used instead of "四" sì. Sometimes "一" yī is not used, or its role is exchanged with "乙" yǐ.

To represent other notes in different octaves, traditions differ among themselves. For Kunqu, the final strokes of "合", "四", "一", "上", "尺", "工" and "凡" are extended by a tiny slash downward for the lower octave; additionally, a left radical "亻" is added to denote one octave higher than the central, or "彳" for two octaves higher. For Cantonese opera, however, "亻" denotes an octave lower, while "彳" denotes only one octave higher.

Some other variations:

- "尺" is replaced by "乂" in the Taiwanese tradition.
- "凡" is replaced by "反" in the Cantonese tradition.
- "𱝫" (⿰彳上), the "do" just above the central octave, is usually replaced by "生" in the Cantonese tradition.

The following are two examples.

Gongche scale for Kunqu
Gongche	𪛗	𪛘	𪛙	𪛚	𪛛	𪛜	𪛝	合	四	一	上	尺	工	凡	六	五	乙	仩	伬	仜	𠆩	𠆾	伍	亿
Jianpu	5̣̣	6̣̣	7̣̣	1̣	2̣	3̣	4̣	5̣	6̣	7̣	1	2	3	4	5	6	7	1̇	2̇	3̇	4̇	5̇	6̇	7̇
Solfege	sol	la	ti	do	re	mi	fa	sol	la	ti	do	re	mi	fa	sol	la	ti	do	re	mi	fa	sol	la	ti

Gongche scale for Cantonese opera
Gongche	佮	仕	亿	仩	伬	仜	仮	合	士	乙	上	尺	工	反	六	五	𢒼	生	鿈	𢓁	𢓉	𢓌	鿉
Jianpu	5̣̣	6̣̣	7̣̣	1̣	2̣	3̣	4̣	5̣	6̣	7̣	1	2	3	4	5	6	7	1̇	2̇	3̇	4̇	5̇	6̇
Solfege	sol	la	ti	do	re	mi	fa	sol	la	ti	do	re	mi	fa	sol	la	ti	do	re	mi	fa	sol	la

== Pronunciation ==
When the notes are sung in different opera traditions, they do not sound as the words would be pronounced in the respective regional dialects. Instead, they are pronounced in an approximation of Modern Standard Chinese pronunciation.

The following are two examples:

Pronunciation of Cantonese Gongche characters
Gongche character	合	士	乙	上	尺	工	反	六	五
Cantonese Gongche Jyutping	ho^{4}	si^{6}	ji^{6}	saang^{3}	ce^{1}	gung^{1}	faan^{1}	liu^{1}	wu^{1}
Cantonese Gongche pronunciation	[hɔ̏ː]	[sìː]	[jìː]	[sɑ̄ːŋ]	[tsʰɛ́ː]	[kʊ́ŋ]	[fɑ́ːn]	[líːu]	[wúː]
Usual Cantonese Jyutping	hap^{6}	si^{6}	jyut^{6}	soeng^{6}	cek^{3}	gung^{1}	faan^{2}	luk^{6}	ng^{5}
Usual Cantonese pronunciation	[hɐ̀p]	[sìː]	[jỳːt]	[sœ̀ːŋ]	[tsʰɛ̄ːk]	[kʊ́ŋ]	[fɑ̌ːn]	[lʊ̀k]	[ŋ̬̍]

Pronunciation of Vietnamese Gongche characters
Gongche character	合	四	乙	上	尺	工	凡	六	五
Sino-Vietnamese Gongche pronunciation	hò	xự	y	xang	xê	cống	phạn	líu	ú
Chữ Nôm transliteration	乎	徐		扛	車	貢		了	呴
IPA	hɔ˨˩	sɨ˧˨ʔ	ʔi˧˧	saːŋ˧˧	se˧˧	kəwŋ͡m˧˦	faːn˧˨ʔ	liw˧˦	ʔu˧˦
Standard Sino-Vietnamese pronunciation	hợp	tứ	ất	thượng	xích	công	phàm	lục	ngũ
IPA	həːp̚˧˨ʔ	tɨ˧˦	ʔət̚˧˦	tʰɨəŋ˧˨ʔ	sïk̟̚˧˦	kəwŋ͡m˧˧	faːm˨˩	lʊwk͡p̚˧˨ʔ	ŋu˦ˀ˥

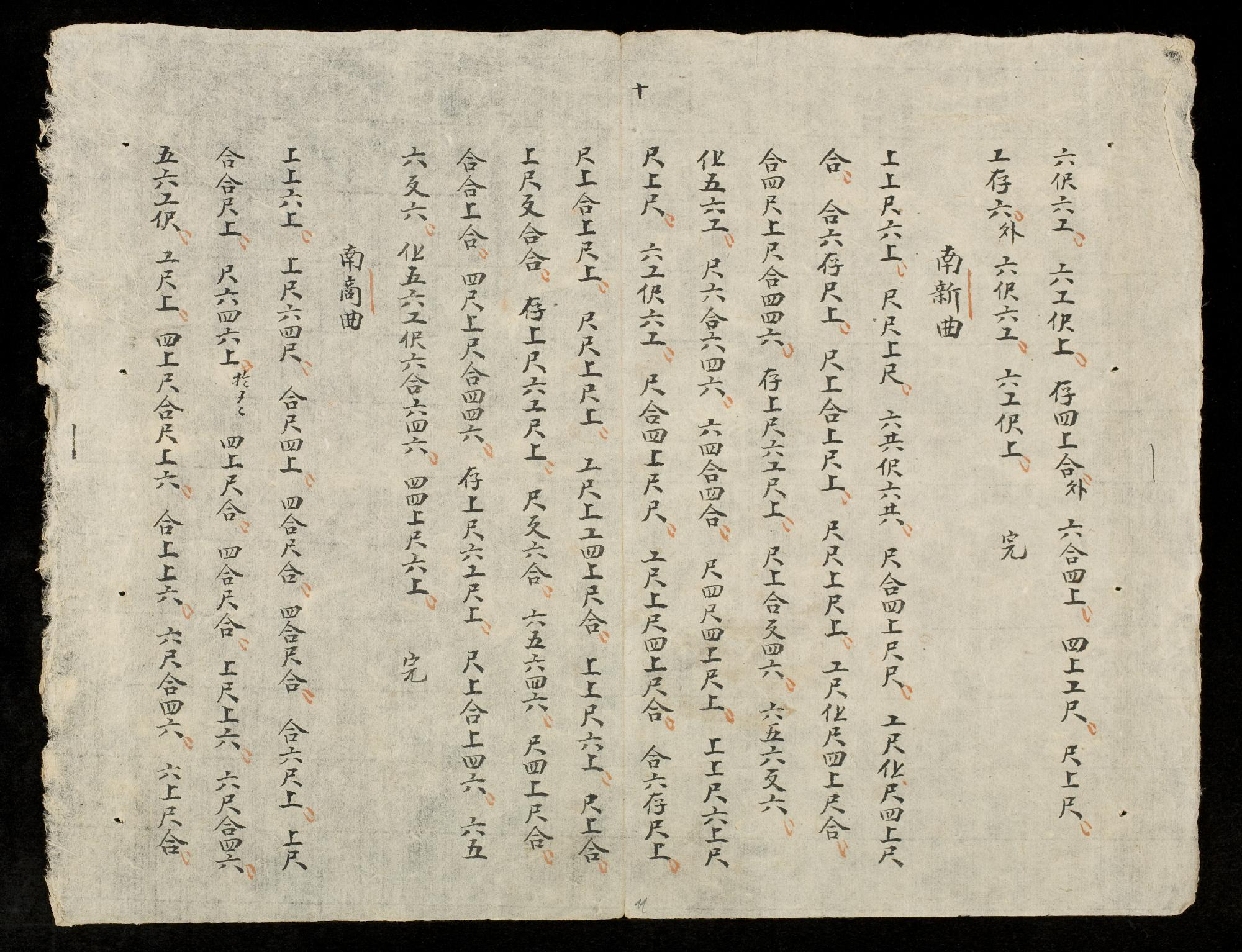
Gongche notation in the Vietnamese book, Cổ cầm tân cựu tập 古琴新舊集

== Rhythm ==
The melody of Old MacDonald Had a Farm in gongche notation

Gongche notation does not mark the relative length of the notes. Instead, marks for the percussion, understood to be played at regular intervals, are written alongside the notes. Gongche is written in the same format as Chinese was traditionally written; from top to bottom and then from right to left. The rhythm marks are written to the right of the note characters.

The diagram at the left illustrates how the tune "Old McDonald Had a Farm" will look like if written in gongche notation. Here, "。" denotes the stronger beat, called bǎn (板) or pāi (拍), and "、" denotes the weaker beat, called yǎn (眼) or liáo (撩). In effect, there is one beat in every two notes, i.e. two notes are sung or played to each beat. These notes in solfege with markings will show a similar effect:

do do do sol la la sol mi mi re re do

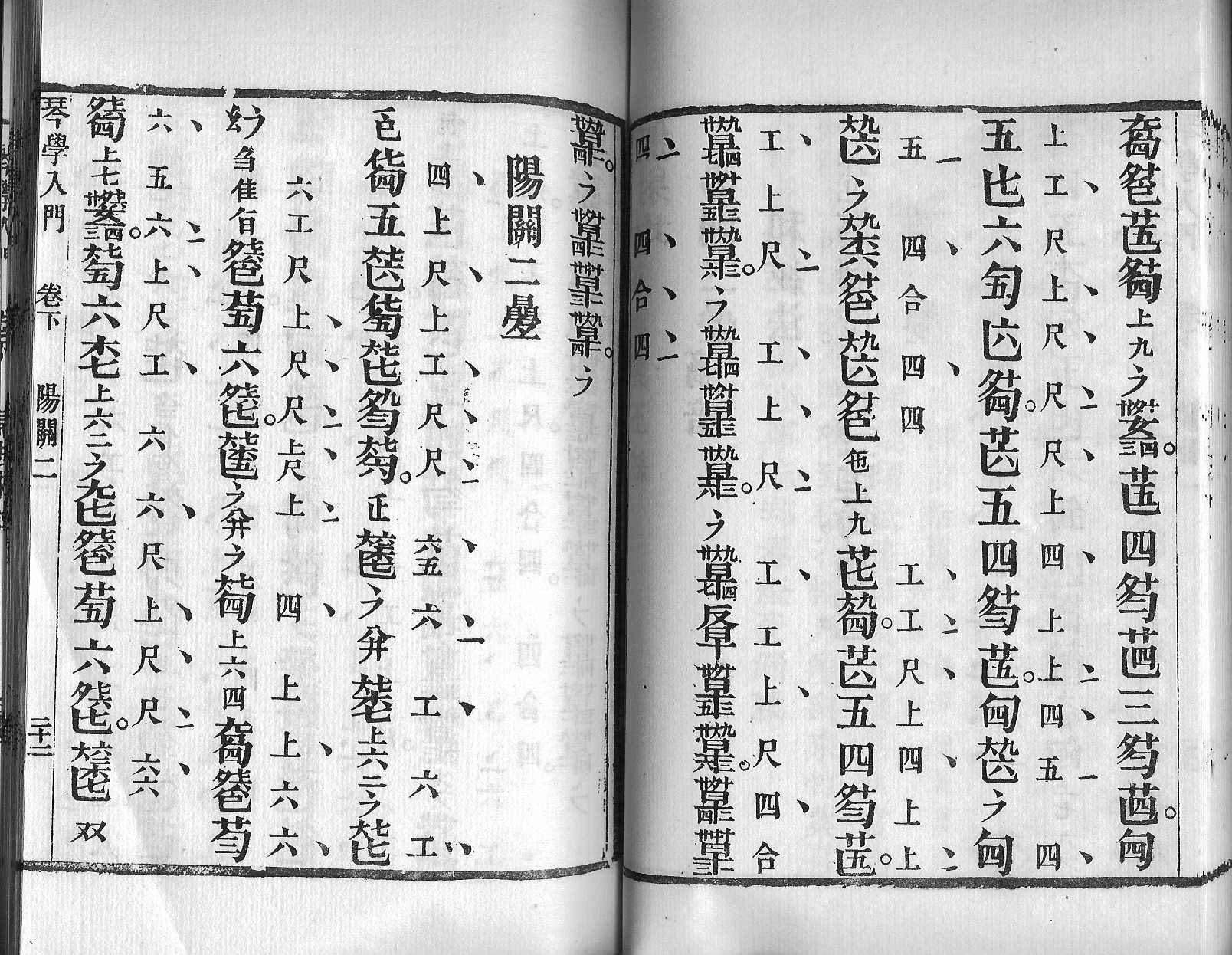
Example of gongche use with guqin tablature and beat marks.

Using this method, only the number of notes within a beat can be specified. The actual length of each note is up to tradition and the interpretation of the artist.

Notice that the actual rhythm marks used differ among various traditions.

== History and usage ==
Gongche notation was invented in the Tang dynasty. It became popular in the Song dynasty. It is believed to have begun as a tablature of certain musical instrument, possibly using a fixed "do" system. Later it became a popular pitch notation, typically using a movable "do" system.

The notation is not accurate in modern sense. It provides a musical skeleton, allowing an artist to improvise. The details are usually passed on by oral tradition. However, once a tradition is lost, it is very difficult to reconstruct how the music was supposed to sound. Variations among different traditions increased the difficulty in learning the notation.

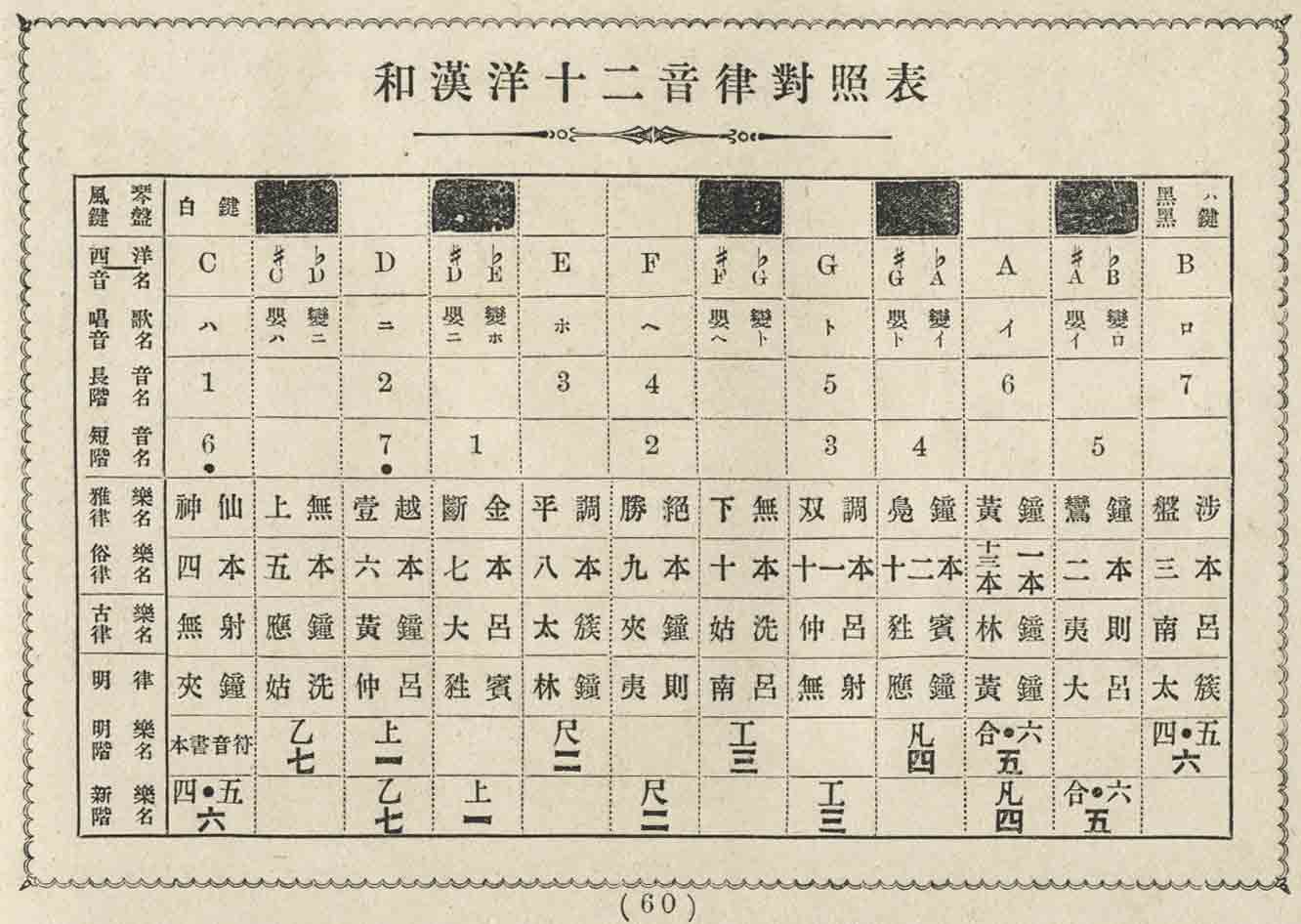
A comparative table of Gongche notation and other notations, from a book published in Kyoto in 1909. In Japan, Gongche notation became widespread to a certain extent.

The system was also introduced to Korea (where it is referred to as gong jeok bo) in ancient times and many traditional musicians still learn their music from such scores (although they typically perform from memory).

Kunkunshi, a Ryukyuan musical notation still in use for sanshin, was directly influenced by Gongche.

== See also ==
- Jianpu
