= Galin-Paris-Chevé system =

Cipher notation system for teaching musical theory

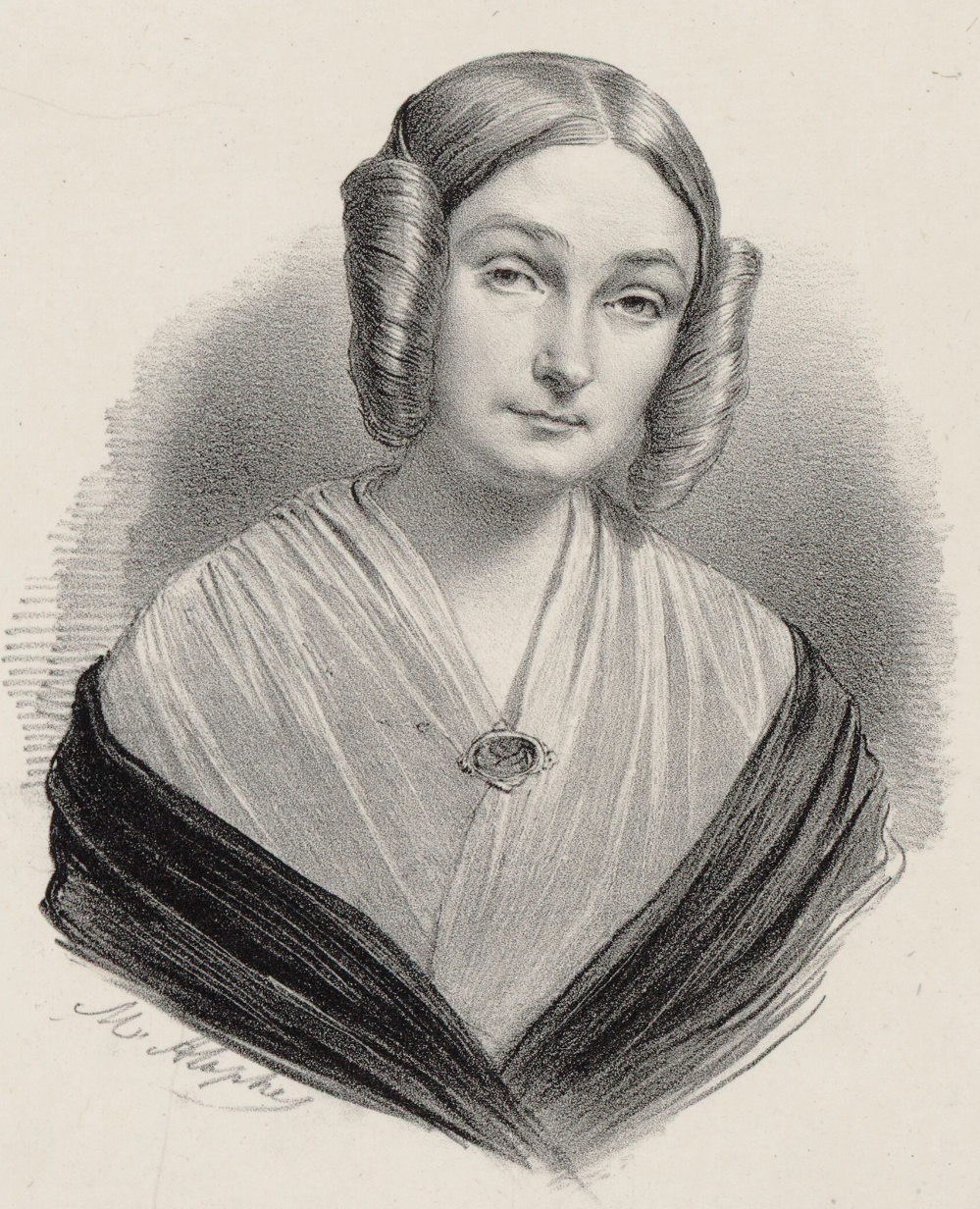
Nanine Paris Chevé (1800–68).

The Galin-Paris-Chevé system is a method of reading music, based on the ideas of Jean-Jacques Rousseau, founded by Pierre Galin (1786–1821) and developed by Aimé Paris (1798–1866), his sister Nanine Paris (1800–1868), and her husband Émile-Joseph-Maurice Chevé (1804–1864).

== Origin ==
According to the Genevan philosopher Jean-Jacques Rousseau, the problem with music was that the notation was too complex for any neophyte to learn. Rousseau's System of musical notation tried to simplify and popularize theoretical musical practice.

Rousseau's method started with a fundamental sound, ut (in other words, Do), which was expressed by the number 1; then the seven natural sounds of the tempered keyboard (ut, re, mi, fa, sol, la, si) by the seven numbers 1, 2, 3, 4, 5, 6, 7. To express a change of octave, he used a dot placed above the note to signify the octave immediately above. The placement of this point also indicated that the notes which follow belong to this octave until the next sign. For the octave immediately below the considered note, the point was placed below. The number of points designated the number of octaves raised or lowered.

Galin, Paris, and Chevé were supporters of this method and they wanted to develop this further and popularize a method that could be learned without any musical education, thus creating a popular teaching of music. The system was made widely known when Nanine Paris and her husband Émile Chevé published their Méthode élémentaire de musique vocale (1844). Their method is today largely unknown to French and French-speaking musicians, but is used in China under the name of Jianpu (“simplified system”).

Under this system, musical note lengths are familiarized by means of a series of rhythmic note names which, when spoken aloud, pattern the effect of the notes concerned. This method became known as the "Langue des durées". This system was later adapted and popularized in the English-speaking world. In England, it was advocated by John Curwen, being incorporated into the Tonic Sol-fa method under the name of "French time names". In the United States, it was popularized by Lowell Mason.

== Other pages ==
- Music Theory
- Sight singing
