= Tonic Sol-Fa Reporter =

Monthly music journal established in 1851

The Tonic Sol-Fa Reporter was a monthly music journal established by the London music publisher John Curwen in 1851. Shortly after Curwen's death in 1880, his son, John Spencer Curwen, succeeded his father as managing editor in 1881. In 1889 the journal was renamed the Musical Herald and Tonic Sol-Fa Reporter, and in 1891 the periodical was renamed a final time to The Musical Herald. The publication had a large circulation and was one of the most widely read musical periodicals during the late 19th and early 20th centuries. The journal was unusual in that its targeted audience was both professional and amateur musicians. The periodical included a mix of scholarly publications with a music education focus along with articles reviewing music events, interviews with musicians, music news items, and advertisements for music-related events, materials, and music education opportunities. The periodical had a significant impact on the field of music education by contributing to the popularizing of the tonic sol-fa pedagogical technique for teaching sight-reading to singers. It ceased publication in 1920.
