= Émile-Joseph-Maurice Chevé =

French music theorist and music teacher

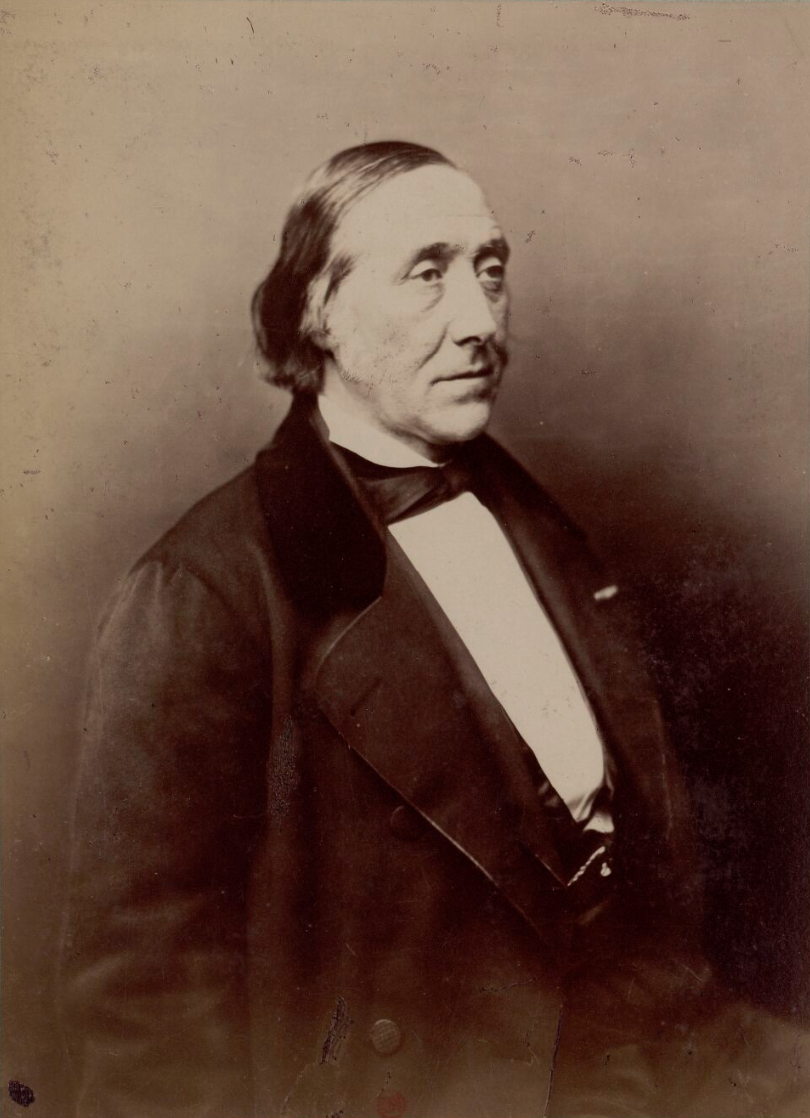
- Born: May 31, 1804; Douarnenez
- Died: August 25, 1864 (aged 60)
- Known for: Galin-Paris-Chevé system
- Children: Amand Chevé

Academic work
- Discipline: music theory
- Notable works: Méthode élémentaire de musique vocale, théorie et pratique, chiffrée et portée

Émile-Joseph-Maurice Chevé (May 31, 1804 – August 25, 1864) was a French music theorist and music teacher.

Chevé was born in Douarnenez. He entered the Marines at age 16 and qualified there to become a doctor and surgeon. In 1835, he returned to Paris and studied medicine and mathematics. He also visited a course taught by Aimé Paris, who propagated a music notation system inherited from Pierre Galin that is now known as the Galin-Paris-Chevé system. He was very attracted to the method, and when he ended up marrying Paris's sister Nanine Paris, he promoted and developed it together with Paris. This system is still used in China and other countries, known as the numbered musical notation.

From 1844, he gave in Paris more than 150 courses in the method, which became known as the Galin-Paris-Chevé method. He also edited with his wife a series of textbooks that were used at such schools as the École normale supérieure, the École polytechnique and the Lycée Louis-le-Grand.

His son Amand Chevé carried forth his interest in the system. Under John Curwen it came into the English-speaking world, and was carried by Lowell Mason into the United States. A hundred years later, the Hungarian music educator Zoltán Kodály adapted the system in his Kodály Method.

He is also the uncle of Émile-Frédéric-Maurice Chevé (1829-1897), a poet.

== Writings ==
- Méthode élémentaire de musique vocale, théorie et pratique, chiffrée et portée
- Méthode d'harmonie et de composition
- 800 duos gradués
- Méthode élémentaire de piano
- Appel au bon sens de toutes les nations qui désirent voir se généraliser chez elles l'enseignement musical
- Protestation adressée au comité central d'instruction primaire de la ville de Paris, contre un rapport de la Commission de chant
- La routine et le bon sens
- Coup de grâce à la routine musicale
