= Psalmist movement =

19th-century British music education movement

Psalmist movement is a term that covers a period of mass musical education in Britain having its roots in the dissenting congregational church singing organisations of late 18th century in regional Scotland and Northern England, which, by the mid-19th century, was to become a vibrant metropolitan cultural institution, coinciding with radical developments in broader national schools policy, the latter owing much to the teaching methods used by the psalmist singing schools. It is sometimes also referred to as the 'choral revival'.

The names most often associated with the 'movement' in Britain are John Curwen (1816–1880), Sarah Ann Glover (1785–1867) and John Pyke Hullah (1812–24), However it had its philosophical roots in Europe, particularly in the social idealism of Johann Heinrich Pestalozzi. In Bernarr Rainbow's words 'As a result of the series of weekly massed singing classes introduced at Exeter Hall under government sanction, the people of London became more musically conscious between 1841 and 1843 than they had ever been.'

== Sources ==
- Cowgill, Rachel and Peter Holman (eds) 2007, Music in the British Provinces, 1690–1914 Ashgate
- Curwen, John Spencer Studies in Worship Music - www.archive.org/stream/studiesinworship
- Rainbow, Bernarr 1970, The Choral Revival in the Anglican Church (1839–1872) 1970 (London); with special reference to PART 1/3 'The Cradle of the Movement', pp. 43–57.
