= Giorgio Ferrari =

Italian composer, administrator, and teacher

Giorgio Ferrari (1925 – 13 January 2010) was an Italian composer, administrator and teacher.

He was born in Genoa, and graduated in violin and composition. After a spell as a violinist in the Orchestra della RAI of Turin, Ferrari started a career as a composer, which he combined with that of teacher and administrator. In 1961 he accepted the direction of the "Canepa" musical institute of Sassari; in 1966 he was appointed to the chair of composition at the Conservatory of Turin. From 1968 to 1970, as artistic director of the Teatro Regio, he presented challenging works from the 20th century by composers from Janáček to Shostakovich, from Malipiero to Falla. In 1978 he left the chair of composition to become director of the Conservatory, and in 1988 he was asked to succeed Alberto Erede at the helm of the Premio Paganini international violin competition. He continued in that capacity until 2002 when he stood down because of his health. An obituary in the Italian magazine Giornale della Musica said:

He leaves a rich oeuvre that includes chamber music, symphonic music and theatrical works in an independent style that draws on twentieth century experiences, attentive to the most modern solutions, but at the same time linked to a tradition reinvented with critical intelligence and expressive autonomy.

Ferrari died in Turin on 13 January 2010, at the age of 84.
