= Roberto Goitre =

Italian choirmaster, composer, and teacher

Roberto Goitre (Turin, 1927 - Piacenza, 1980) was an Italian choirmaster, composer and teacher.

Upon finishing his academic studies, Goitre devoted himself entirely to choral conducting. At the beginning of the 1960s, on invitation from Marcello Abbado, he became director of the choir of the "Giuseppe Nicolini" Conservatoire in Piacenza, where he taught until his death in 1980.

In the 1970s Goitre turned his attention to the musical pedagogy of Zoltán Kodály and spent a significant amount of time in Hungary carrying out research. He also widened his knowledge of Italian and Hungarian folk tunes, which he made use of when creating exercises and examples to include in his own teaching method, the Cantar Leggendo (meaning "to sing whilst reading"), published in 1972 by the Suvini Zerboni publishing house .

This method was a new way of teaching music, equally suitable for infants and adults, and was based on the idea that a child should be taught music like a language, or in other words, as a kind of musical mother tongue.

Roberto Goitre founded two choirs, the Piccoli Cantori in Turin in 1972 and the Coro Polifonico Farnesiano in Piacenza in 1976. The current directors of these choirs, Carlo Pavese and Mario Pigazzini, still use the Cantar Leggendo method exclusively.

Goitre dedicated all his life to musical pedagogy and choral music. It was indeed he who, at the start of the 1970s, founded the magazine La Cartellina, which is still today a very important magazine on choral music and musical pedagogy. The current editor of this magazine is Marco Boschini.
