= Sarah Anna Glover =

English music educator (1786–1867)

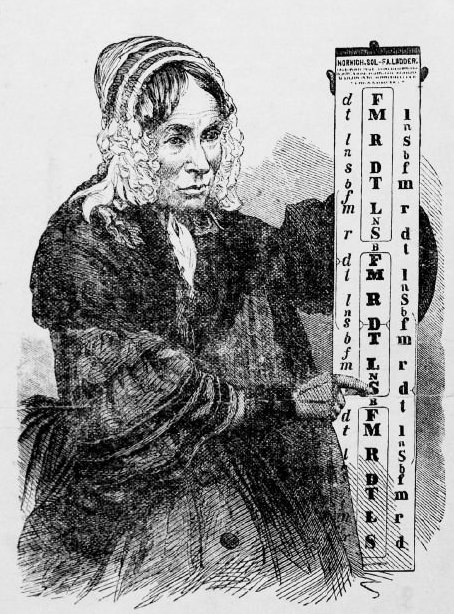
- Born: November 13, 1786; Norwich, Norfolk
- Died: October 20, 1867 (aged 80); Great Malvern, Worcestershire
- Occupation: Music educator
- Known for: Inventing the Norwich Sol-Fa system; inventing the harmonicon

Sarah Anna Glover (13 November 1786–20 October 1867) was an English music educator who invented the Norwich sol-fa system. It was based on the ancient gamut; however, she omitted the constant recital of the alphabetical names of each note and the arbitrary syllable indicating its key relationship, and also the recital of two or more such syllables when the same note was common to as many keys (e.g. C, Fa, Ut, meaning that C is the subdominant of G and the tonic of C). The notes were represented by the initials of the seven syllables, C, D, E, F, S, L, T; still in use today as their names.

== Early life ==
Sarah Anna Glover was born in The Close, in the English city of Norwich. She was baptized in St Luke's Chapel in Norwich Cathedral (the parish church of St Mary in the Marsh) on 18 November 1786. Glover received music lessons from the cathedral organist at the age of six. While teaching a Sunday school with her sister, she began creating her own simplified notation system, now known as the Norwich Sol-Fa system. Little of her career is known until her late twenties.

== Career ==
Glover's father became the curate of St Laurence's Church, Norwich in 1811, which led to her taking over the music for the church around that time. Her influence made St Laurence's respected for its music, and young women were sent to her for training.

In 1812, Glover started developing educational methods that ended in two major publications—German Canons or Singing Exercises and Psalm Tunes Expressed in the Sol-Fa Notation of Music and Scheme for Rendering Psalmody Congregational. By 1827, she had developed a complete method musical notation, that she was using while teaching at an all-girls school that she founded in Black Boys Yard. In her notation system, the notes were represented by the initials of the seven tones of the diatonic scale. In doing this, she gave the name "ti" for the seventh scale degree that is still used today. She developed this learning system to aid teachers with a cappella singing. Her instructional book Scheme for Rendering Psalmody Congregational (1835) met with great success. It was later refined and developed by the English Congregationalist minister John Curwen, without her permission. While there was ongoing intellectual conversation between Glover and Curwen, there was always friction. The system later became well known in popular culture after it was featured in a song from the musical The Sound of Music.

Glover is credited with the invention of the harmonicon, a musical instrument designed to help her teach her notation system. The harmonicon, a glockenspiel-like instrument spanning two chromatic octaves, has 25 glass keys. The instrument works by rotating a roller displaying the notes of the scale and the letters of the alphabet, which could be moved to align with different musical keys.

=== Later life ===
Glover later lived in Cromer, then Reading, then Hereford. She died of a stroke in Great Malvern and was buried in Hereford.

== See also ==
- Psalmist movement

== Sources ==
- Wilson, Jim, ed. (1996). 900 years - Norwich Cathedral and Diocese: A Guide to the Past and the Present. Norwich, UK: Jarrold. ISBN 0711708533.

== Works ==
- Glover, Sarah (1835). Scheme for Rendering Psalmody Congregational. Norwich, UK: Jarrold & Sons – via IMSLP.
