= Kodály method =

System of music education

The Kodály method, also referred to as the Kodály concept, is an approach to music education developed in Hungary during the mid-twentieth century by Zoltán Kodály. His philosophy of education served as inspiration for the method, which was then developed over a number of years by his associates. In 2016, the method was inscribed as an item of UNESCO Intangible Cultural Heritage.

== History ==
Kodály became interested in the music education of children in 1925 when he overheard some students singing songs that they had learned at school. Kodály was appalled by the standard of the children's singing, and was inspired to do something to improve the music education system in Hungary. He wrote a number of controversial articles, columns, and essays to raise awareness about the issue of music education. In his writings, Kodály criticized schools for using poor-quality music and for only teaching music in the secondary grades. Kodály insisted that the music education system needed better teachers, better curriculum, and more class time devoted to music.

Beginning in 1935, along with his colleague Jenő Ádám, he embarked on a long-term project to reform music teaching in the lower and middle schools by actively creating a new curriculum and new teaching methods, as well as writing new musical compositions for children. His work resulted in the publication of several highly influential books that have had a profound impact on musical education both inside and outside his home country.

Kodály’s efforts finally bore fruit in 1945 when the new Hungarian government began to implement his ideas in the public schools. Socialist control of the educational system facilitated the establishment of Kodály’s methods nationwide. The first music primary school, in which music was taught daily, opened in 1950. The school was so successful that over one hundred music primary schools opened within the next decade. After about fifteen years roughly half the schools in Hungary were music schools.

Kodály’s success eventually spilled outside of Hungarian borders. Kodály’s method was first presented to the international community in 1958 at a conference of the International Society for Music Educators (I.S.M.E.) held in Vienna. Another I.S.M.E. conference in Budapest in 1964 allowed participants to see Kodály’s work first-hand, causing a surge of interest. Music educators from all over the world traveled to Hungary to visit Kodály’s music schools. The first symposium dedicated solely to the Kodály method was held in Oakland, California in 1973; it was at this event that the International Kodály Society was inaugurated. Today Kodály-based methods are used throughout the world.

== Pedagogy ==
Using these principles as a foundation, Kodály’s colleagues, friends, and most talented students developed the actual pedagogy now called the Kodály method. Many of the techniques used were adapted from existing methods. The creators of the Kodály method researched music educational techniques used throughout the world and incorporated those they felt were the best and most suited for use in Hungary.

=== Child-developmental approach ===
The Kodály method uses a child-developmental approach to sequence, introducing skills according to the capabilities of the child. New concepts are introduced beginning with what is easiest for the child and progressing to the more difficult. Children are first introduced to musical concepts through experiences such as listening, singing, or movement. It is only after the child becomes familiar with a concept that he or she learns how to notate it, similar to methods like Suzuki. Concepts are constantly reviewed and reinforced through games, movement, songs, and exercises.

=== Rhythm syllables ===
The Kodály method incorporates rhythm syllables similar to those created by nineteenth-century French theoretician Emile-Joseph Chêvé. In this system, note values are assigned specific syllables that express their durations. For example, quarter notes (crotchets) are expressed by the syllable ta while eighth note (quaver) pairs are expressed using the syllables ti-ti. Larger note values are expressed by extending ta to become ta-a or "ta-o" (half note (minim)), ta-a-a or "ta-o-o" (dotted half note/minim), and ta-a-a-a or "ta-o-o-o" (whole note (semibreve)). These syllables are then used when sight-reading or otherwise performing rhythms.

Rhythm syllables vary internationally. Some variants include te-te rather than ti-ti for eighth notes (quavers) and the use of both ti-ri-ti-ri and ti-ka-ti-ka for sixteenth notes (semi-quavers).

=== Rhythm and movement ===
The Kodály method also includes the use of rhythmic movement, a technique inspired by the work of Swiss music educator Emile Jaques-Dalcroze. Kodály was familiar with Dalcroze’s techniques and agreed that movement is an important tool for the internalization of rhythm. To reinforce new rhythmic concepts, the Kodály method uses a variety of rhythmic movements, such as walking, running, marching, and clapping. These may be performed while listening to music or singing. Some singing exercises call for the teacher to invent appropriate rhythmic movements to accompany the songs.

=== Rhythm sequence and notation ===
Rhythmic concepts are introduced in a child-developmentally appropriate manner based upon the rhythmic patterns of their folk music (for example, 6/8 is more common in English than 2/4, so it should be introduced first). The first rhythmic values taught are quarter notes (crotchets) and eighth notes (quavers), which are familiar to children as the rhythms of their own walking and running. Rhythms are first experienced by listening, speaking in rhythm syllables, singing, and performing various kinds of rhythmic movement. Only after students internalize these rhythms is notation introduced. The Kodály method uses a simplified method of rhythmic notation, writing note heads only when necessary, such as for half notes (minims) and whole notes (semibreves).

=== Movable-do solfège ===
The Kodály method uses a system of movable-do solfège syllables for sight-singing: scale degrees are sung using corresponding syllable names (do, re, mi, fa, so, la, and ti). The syllables represent scale degree function within the key and the relationships between pitches, not absolute pitch. Kodály was first exposed to this technique while visiting England, where a movable-do system created by Sarah Glover and augmented by John Curwen was being used nationwide as a part of choral training. Kodály found movable-do solfège to be helpful in developing a sense of tonal function, thus improving students’ sight-singing abilities. Kodály felt that movable-do solfège should precede acquaintance with the staff, and developed a type of shorthand using solfège initials with simplified rhythmic notation.

=== Melodic sequence and pentatony ===
Scale degrees are introduced in accordance with child-developmental patterns. The first Kodály exercise books were based on the diatonic scale, but educators soon found that children struggled to sing half steps in tune and to navigate within such a wide range. It is thus that the pentatonic scale came to be used as a sort of stepping stone. Revised Kodály exercises begin with the minor third (mi-so) and then, one at a time, add la, do, and re. Only after children become comfortable with these pitches are fa and ti introduced, a much simpler feat when taught in relation to the already established pentatonic scale. Kodály stated that each nation should create its own melodic sequence based upon its own folk music.

=== Hand signs ===
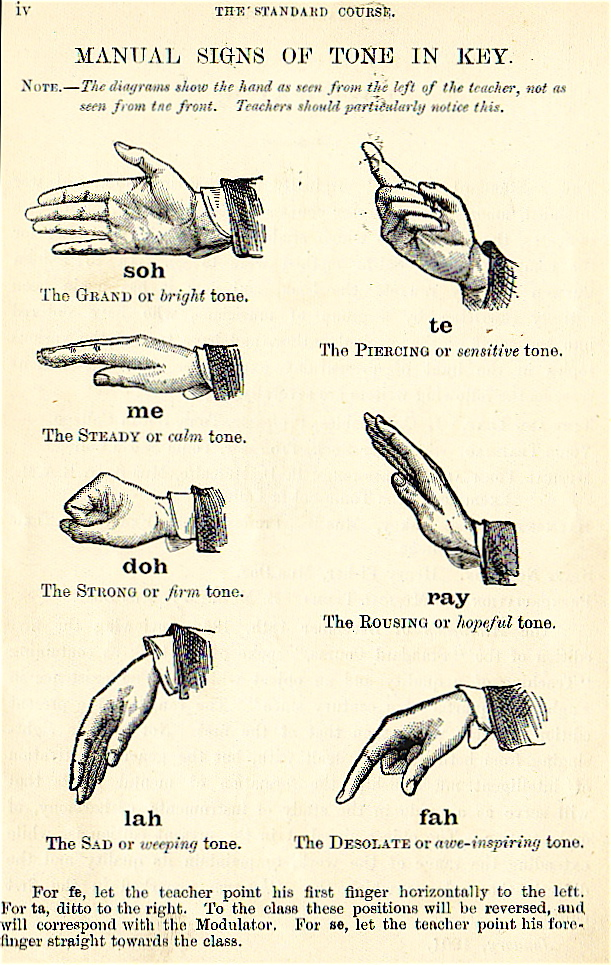
Depiction of Curwen's Solfege hand signs. This version includes the tonal tendencies and interesting titles for each tone.

Hand signs, also borrowed from the teachings of Curwen, are performed during singing exercises to provide a visual aid. This technique assigns to each scale degree a hand sign that shows its particular tonal function. For example, do, mi, and so are stable in appearance, whereas fa and ti point in the direction of mi and do, respectively. Likewise, the hand sign for re suggests motion to do, and that of la to so. Kodály added to Curwen’s hand signs upward/downward movement, allowing children to actually see the height or depth of the pitch. The signs are made in front of the body, with do falling about at waist level and la at eye level. Their distance in space corresponds with the size of the interval they represent. In 2016, computer scientists at Northwestern University invented an instrument which is controlled by the hand signs, facilitating their learning.

== Materials ==
Kodály-method materials are drawn strictly from two sources: "authentic" folk music and "good-quality" composed music. Folk music was thought to be an ideal vehicle for early musical training because of its short forms, pentatonic style, and simple language. Of the classical repertoire, elementary students sing works of major composers of the Baroque, Classical, and Romantic music eras, while secondary-level students sing music from the twentieth century as well.

Kodály collected, composed, and arranged a large number of works for pedagogical use Along with Béla Bartók and other associates, Kodály collected and published six volumes of Hungarian folk music, including over one thousand children’s songs. Much of this literature was used in Kodály method song books and textbooks. High quality music was needed in short and simple forms in order to bridge the gap between folk music and classical works. For this purpose, Kodály composed thousands of songs and sight-singing exercises, making up sixteen educational publications, six of which contain multiple volumes of over one hundred exercises each. Kodály’s complete pedagogical works are published collectively by Boosey & Hawkes as The Kodály Choral Method.

Some pedagogical tools that are particularly useful for Elementary Music Educators include: Susan Brumfield's "First We Sing" books, Joy Nelson's "The Music Effect Kindergarten" books, and Zoltan Kodály's "333 Reading Exercises". These materials are essential to understanding the Kodály specific sequence of instruction.

In the Kodály Approach: Sequence of Conscious Concepts adapted by Ann Kay, there are level K-5 categories of rhythm, melody, harmony, and form that perfectly follow the flow of instruction. Ranging from learning high/low to harmonic minor, single melody to I-IV-V, and call-response to tonal answers, students will be able to get a successful primary music education from kindergarten through 5th grade.

== Results ==
Studies have shown that the Kodály method improves intonation, rhythm skills, music literacy, and the ability to sing in increasingly complex parts. Outside music, it has been shown to improve perceptual functioning, concept formation, motor skills, and performance in other academic areas such as reading and mathematics.
