= Aimé Paris =

French scholar (1798–1866)

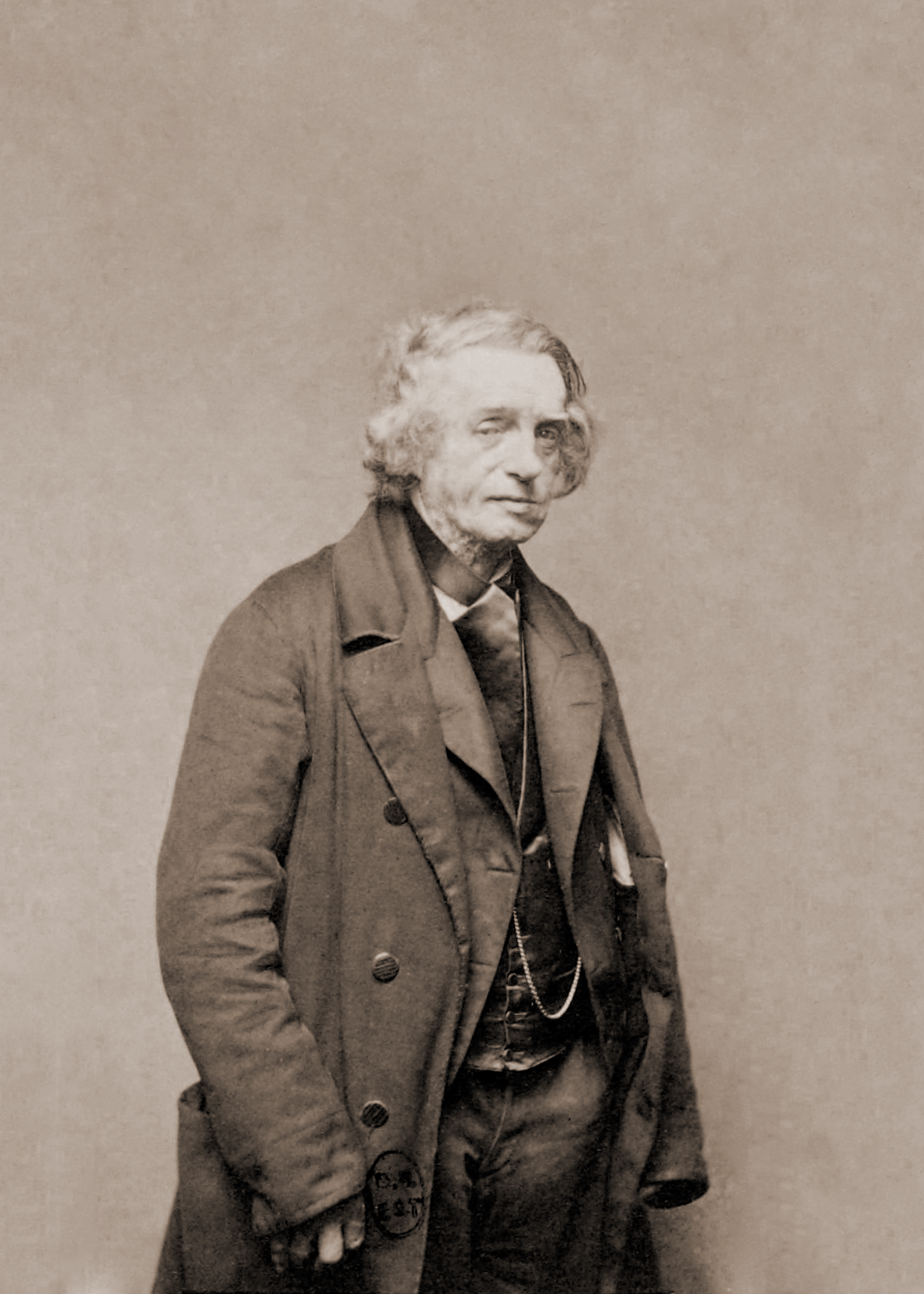
- Occupation(s): Music theorist and scholar
- Known for: Galin-Paris-Chevé system

Academic work
- Notable works: History of Stenography; Inventions of Aimé Paris

Aimé Paris (1798–1866) was a French scholar. He was the developer of a method of stenography, and co-developer and propagator of what became the Galin-Paris-Chevé system of music notation.

Paris studied mathematics and law, and became a lawyer. His techniques of memory were well known; at one point he was the "professeur de mnémonique" at the Athenée in Paris.

== Stenography ==
In 1815, he learned the system of Samuel Taylor, adapted by Théodore-Pierre Bertin for French. In 1820, after inventing his own method of stenography, he abandoned his career as a lawyer and traveled across France, as well as the Netherlands, Belgium, and Switzerland, giving conferences and teaching his system. He published the books History of Stenography and Inventions of Aimé Paris. His stenographic works were followed and completed by Louis Prosper Guénin.

== Music system advocacy ==
He approached Pierre Galin when he moved to Paris, and asked to be his business-manager, so Galin could work on setting his music education ideas into print. However, once admitted as Galin's successor, he plagiarized Galin's ideas and denied having known him.

After Galin died in 1822 without publishing a full explanation of his ideas, several teachers led classes claiming to follow his methods. Paris decided to devote himself to propagating what he knew of Galin's methods, with a few minor modifications. He published numerous pamphlets on the technique, and toured schools widely, offering challenges to music teachers. According to Fétis, his challenges were designed so that he could be denounced in tract or speech regardless of whether they were accepted or not.

His sister, Nanine Paris, married the surgeon Emile Chevé, who became an advocate for the system. Paris, along with his sister and Emile Chevé, continued touring and publishing pamphlets until his death.

== Mnemonics ==
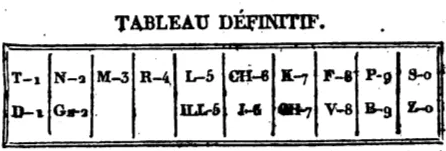
Mnemonic major system by Aimé Paris from 1825. – 1: T, D; 2: N, GN; 3: M; 4: R; 5: L, ILL; 6:CH, J; 7: K, GH; 8: F, V; 9: P, B; 0: S, Z

Aimé Paris was the first person to publish a version of the mnemonic major system in its modern form.
