= Pierre Galin =

French music educator (1786–1821)

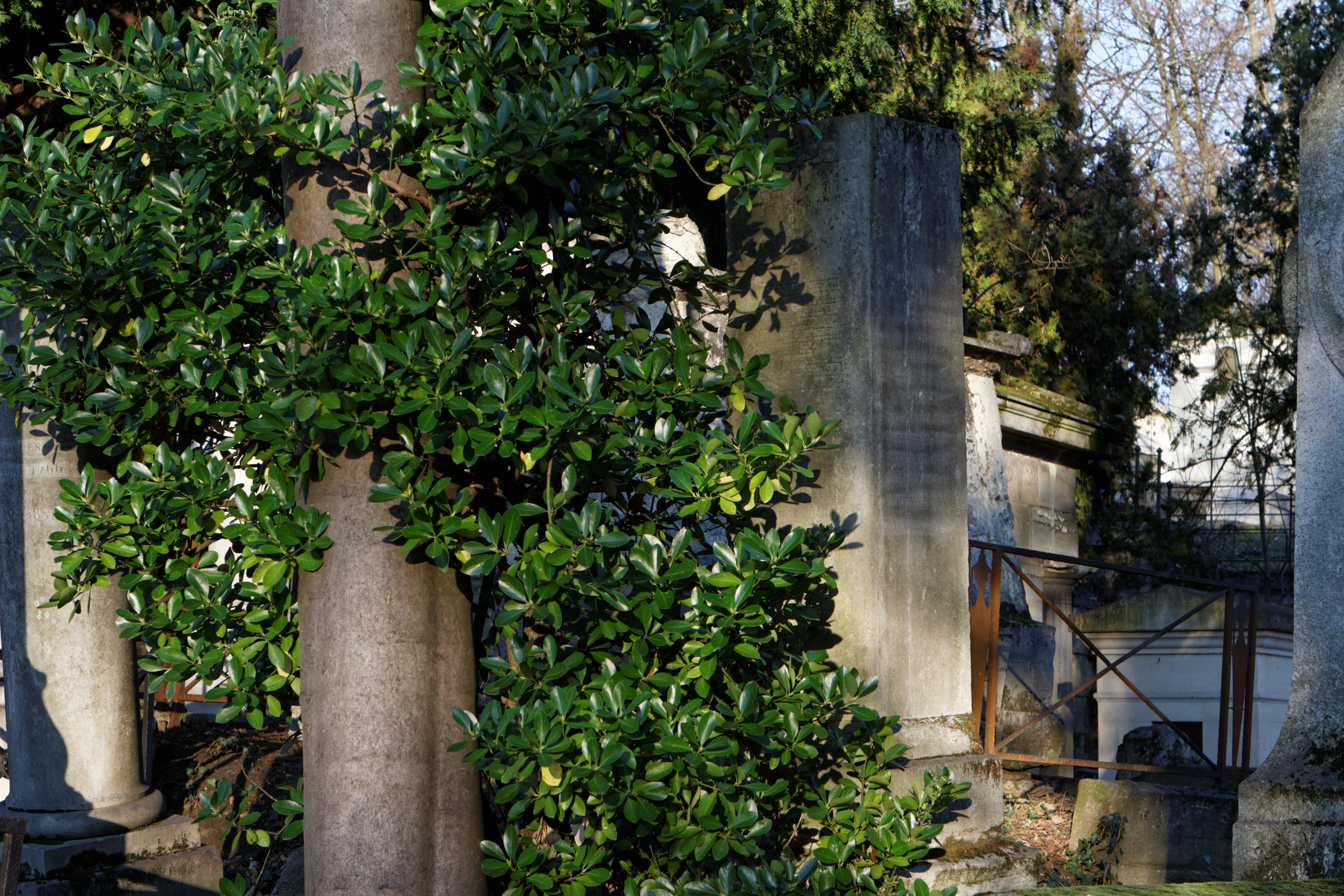
- The tomb of Pierre Galin in Père Lachaise Cemetery
- Born: 16 December 1786
- Died: 31 August 1821 (aged 34)
- Occupation: Music theorist and educator
- Known for: Galin-Paris-Chevé system

Pierre Galin (16 December 1786–31 August 1821) was a French music educator, and developer of what became the Galin-Paris-Chevé system.

== Life and career ==
Galin studied mathematics and commerce, and became a mathematics teacher in Bordeaux, at a school for children with speech and hearing difficulties. He studied music on his own, but had difficulty understanding his textbooks until he discovered the principles of movable do solfège. He advised separate study of pitch and rhythm, and devised a numbered musical notation similar to that of Rousseau, although he recommended students learn staff notation as well.

After success teaching with his ideas in Bordeaux, he moved to Paris where he led a group of enthusiastic students, especially Aimé Paris. Paris ended up plagiarizing his ideas in print, and later claimed never to have known him. Galin became sick, though he continued teaching up to his death. He is buried in Père Lachaise Cemetery.

== System ==
He never published an explanation of his teaching system, although his Exposition d’une nouvelle méthode pour l’enseignement de la musique or Explanation of a New Way of Teaching Music (1818), addressed to the teacher, sets out many of his ideas. In addition to his new notation, he advocated the use of méloplaste ("song-shaper"), a staff with no clef but only a keynote indicated, from which he pointed tunes with a stick for the students to sing. For rhythm, he advocated a chronomerist, a table of note values all clearly related to a single unit, which makes clear the accentual patterns.

== Works ==
- Exposition d’une nouvelle méthode pour l’enseignement de la musique / Explanation of a New Way of Teaching Music (3 eds.: 1818, 1835, 1862)
