= Maginardo =

Italian architect

Fresco from 1597, depicting the then recently demolished Tempio di San Donato by Maginardo

Maginardo (fl. 1006–1032), called Aretino, was an Italian architect active in the Diocese of Arezzo during the episcopates of Elempert (986–1010), William (1010–1013), Adalbert (1014–1023), and Tedald (1023–1036), who called him arte architectonica optime erudito (Latin for "the most erudite in the architectural art").

Maginardo's career began in 1006–09, when he participated in the reconstruction of the eighth-century cathedral at Arezzo dedicated to Stephen the Protomartyr and the Virgin Mary. Maginardo's second great project was the addition of a chapel dedicated to Saint Donatus to the side of the cathedral. This building was finished in 1032 and dedicated on 12 November.

In 1019 or 1026 Maginardo was sent to Ravenna by his bishop (probably Tedald) to study the Byzantine architecture of its monuments. He probably produced sketches of these monuments, but if so they do not survive. The result of his studies was a confluence of pre-romanesque styles: Aretine, Byzantine, and Lombard. This resulted in Maginardo's greatest work: the renovation of the old cathedral on the Pionta, a hill at the centre of Arezzo. This work lies in ruins today, since Cosimo I de' Medici ordered its destruction during his sack of 1561.
