= Lorenzo Nencini =

Italian sculptor

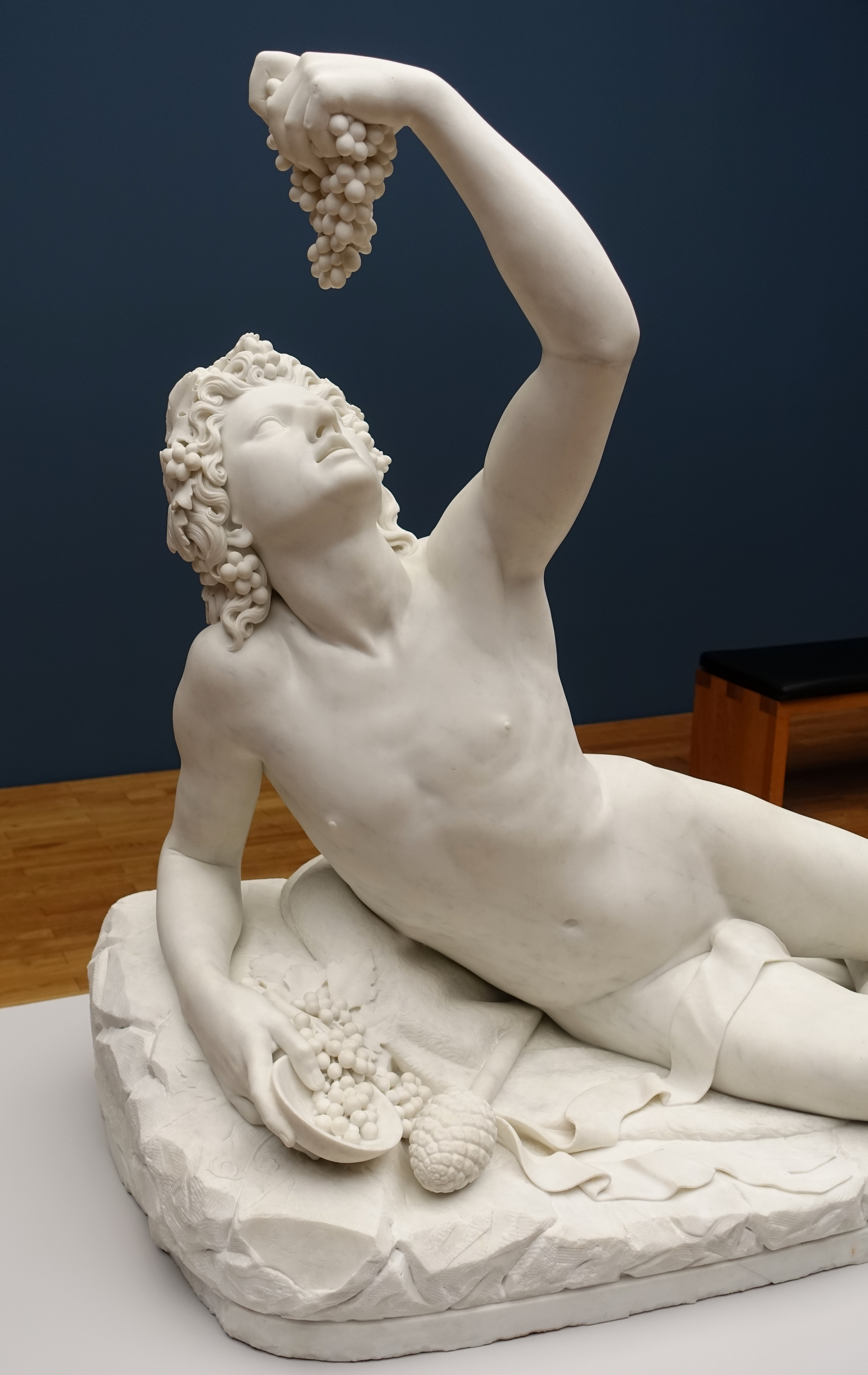
Bacchus, 1830

Lorenzo Nencini (January 10, 1806 – March 14, 1854) was an Italian sculptor associated with Neoclassicism, active primarily in Florence.

== Early life and education ==
Nencini was born in Florence, and in 1819 admitted to that city's Academy of Fine Arts. Starting in 1823, he served his apprenticeship under sculptor Stefano Ricci (1765-1837), from whom Nencini adopted Canova's classicism. In 1827, he won a prize from the Academy, and two years later he was given another prize for his bas-relief depicting Adam and Eve expelled from Eden.

== Career ==
In 1832, he executed a statue of Saint Nicholas, now lost, noted for its reproduction of the historical clothes and accessories. In 1837, he showed a plaster model of what was deemed "the most beautiful of his works" (Saltini, 1862, p. 35), a lounging Bacchante in the act of eating grapes; he exhibited it again at Brera in 1838 and donated it to the Academy in Milan, where it remains today. In 1837, he created the effigy of Guido of Arezzo, inventor of the musical score, for the twenty-seventh niche of the outdoor Loggiato of the Uffizi; it was inaugurated ten years later on 24 June 1847.

In 1838, Nencini created the tomb of Giovita Garavaglia for the Florentine basilica of Santissima Annunziata. He was then commissioned to decorate the porch of the church of Follonica with two bas-reliefs, as well as the gate of San Marco di Livorno, and following these prestigious commissions was commissioned in 1840-41 to execute the bust of Evangelista Torricelli and a medallion depicting Alessandro Marsili (1601–1670) for the Observatory of Galileo in Florence.

In 1844, Nencini was elected a member of the Academy of Fine Arts, and in 1849, he was appointed deputy professor of sculpture. On September 11, 1853, he was elected to the Academic Council for the sculptors' section. His works were exhibited at the London Universal Exposition of 1854.

Nencini died in Florence on March 14, 1854.
