= Luigi Pampaloni =

Italian sculptor

Luigi Pampaloni (Florence, 1791–1847) was an Italian sculptor, active in a Neoclassical style.

He studied under Lorenzo Bartolini in Florence.

In 1826, he designed, together with Giovanozzi, the Fountain of the Naiads in Empoli.

In 1834, he completed a bust of Maria Antonietta of Bourbon, sister of Ferdinand II of Naples. He sculpted a statue of her husband, Leopold II, Grand Duke of Tuscany, for a piazza in San Miniato.

He sculpted statues of Brunelleschi and Arnolfo di Cambio for the Duomo of Florence, and the full-length Leonardo da Vinci statue for the Loggiato of the Uffizi.

== Gallery ==
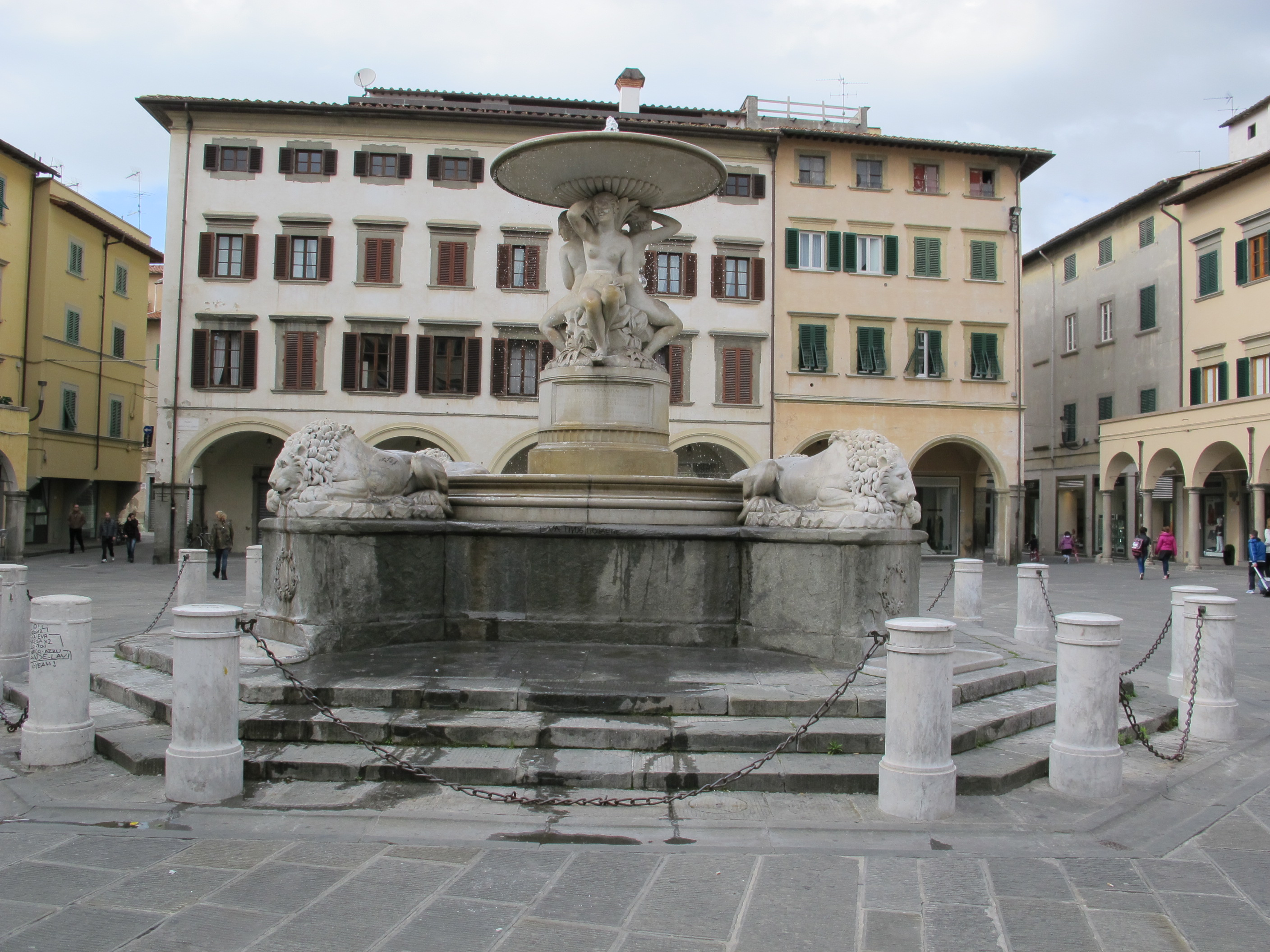
Fountain of the Naiads, Empoli

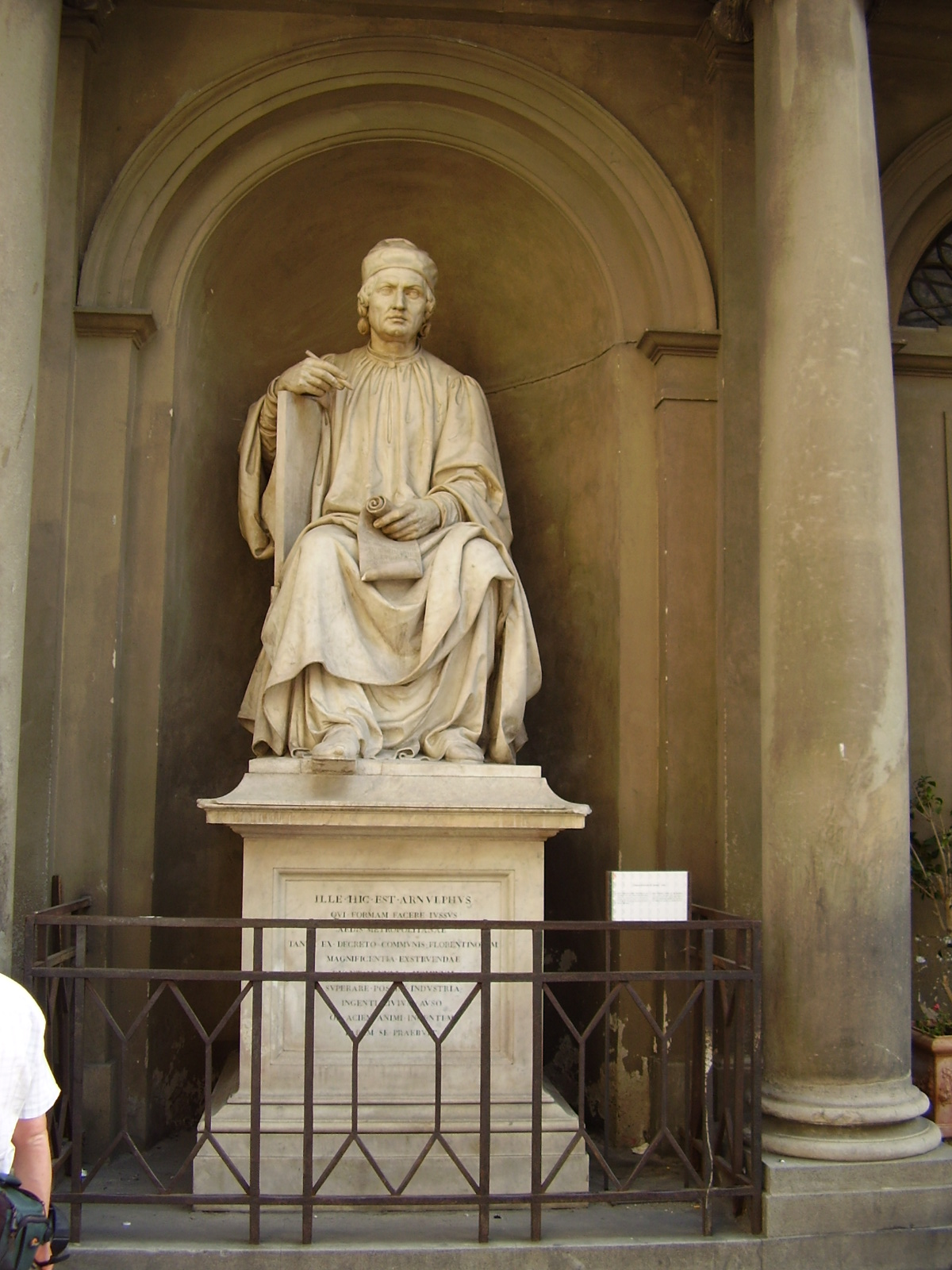
Arnolfo di Cambio

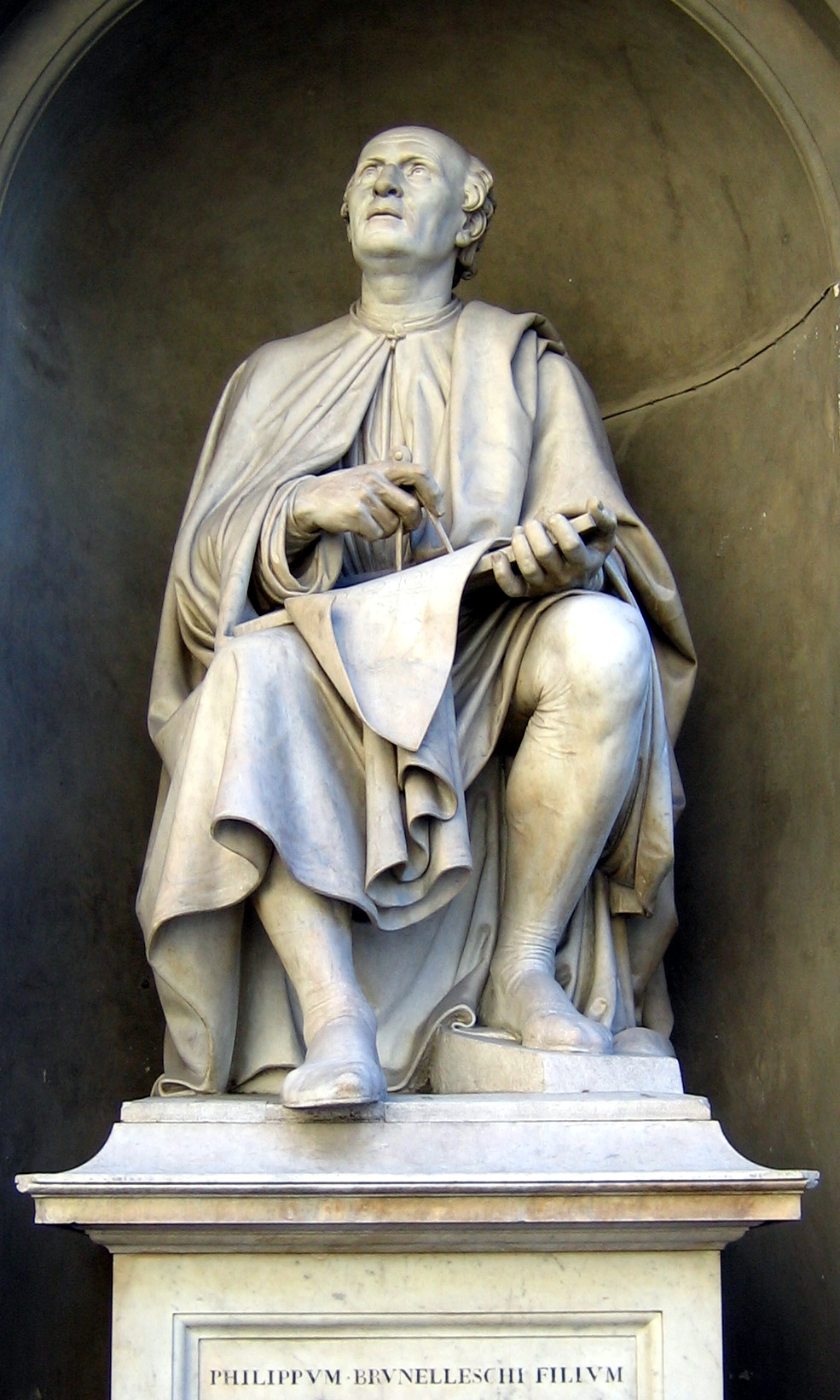
Brunelleschi, gazing at his dome.

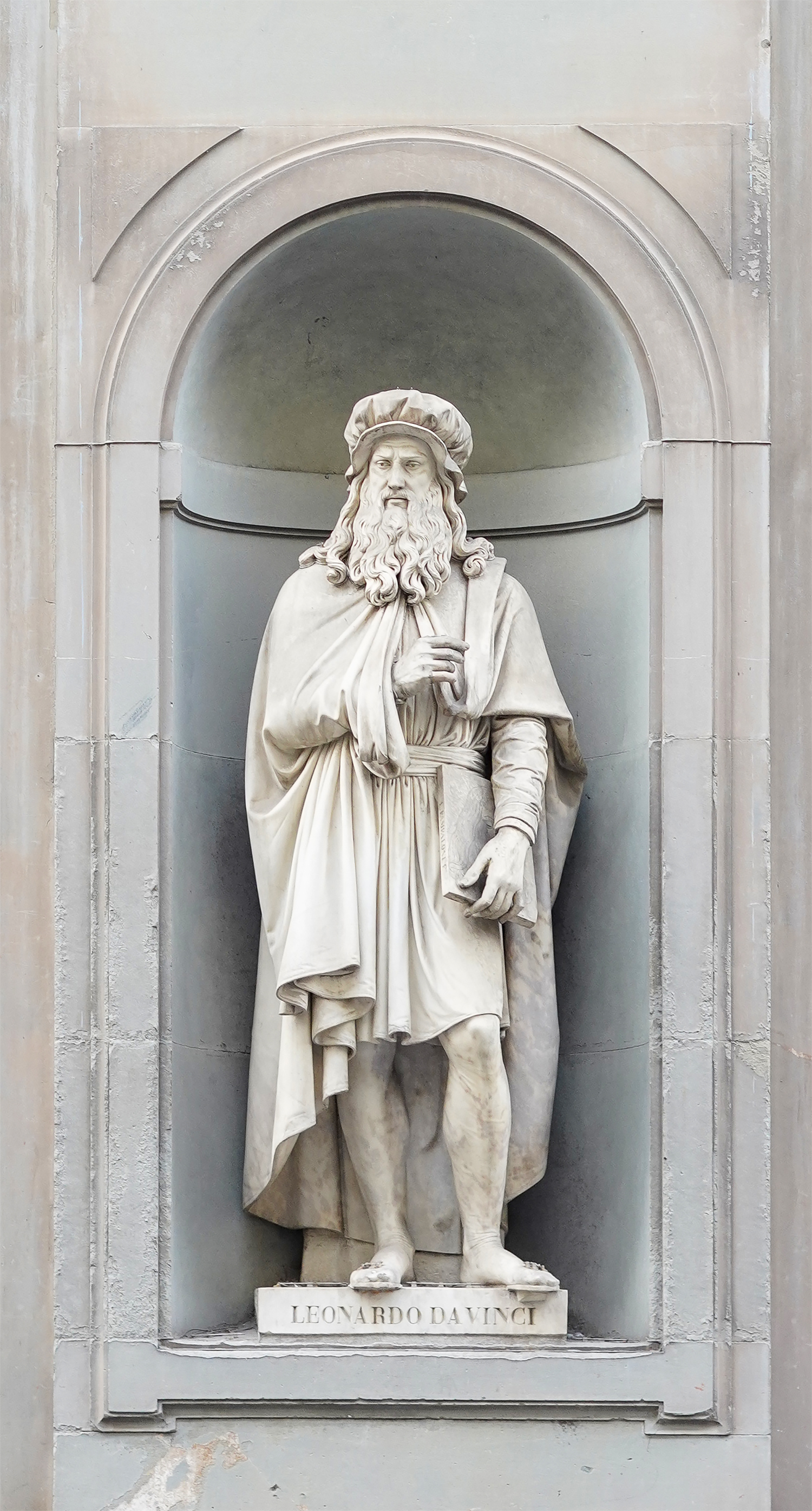
Leonardo Da Vinci in Loggiato of the Uffizi

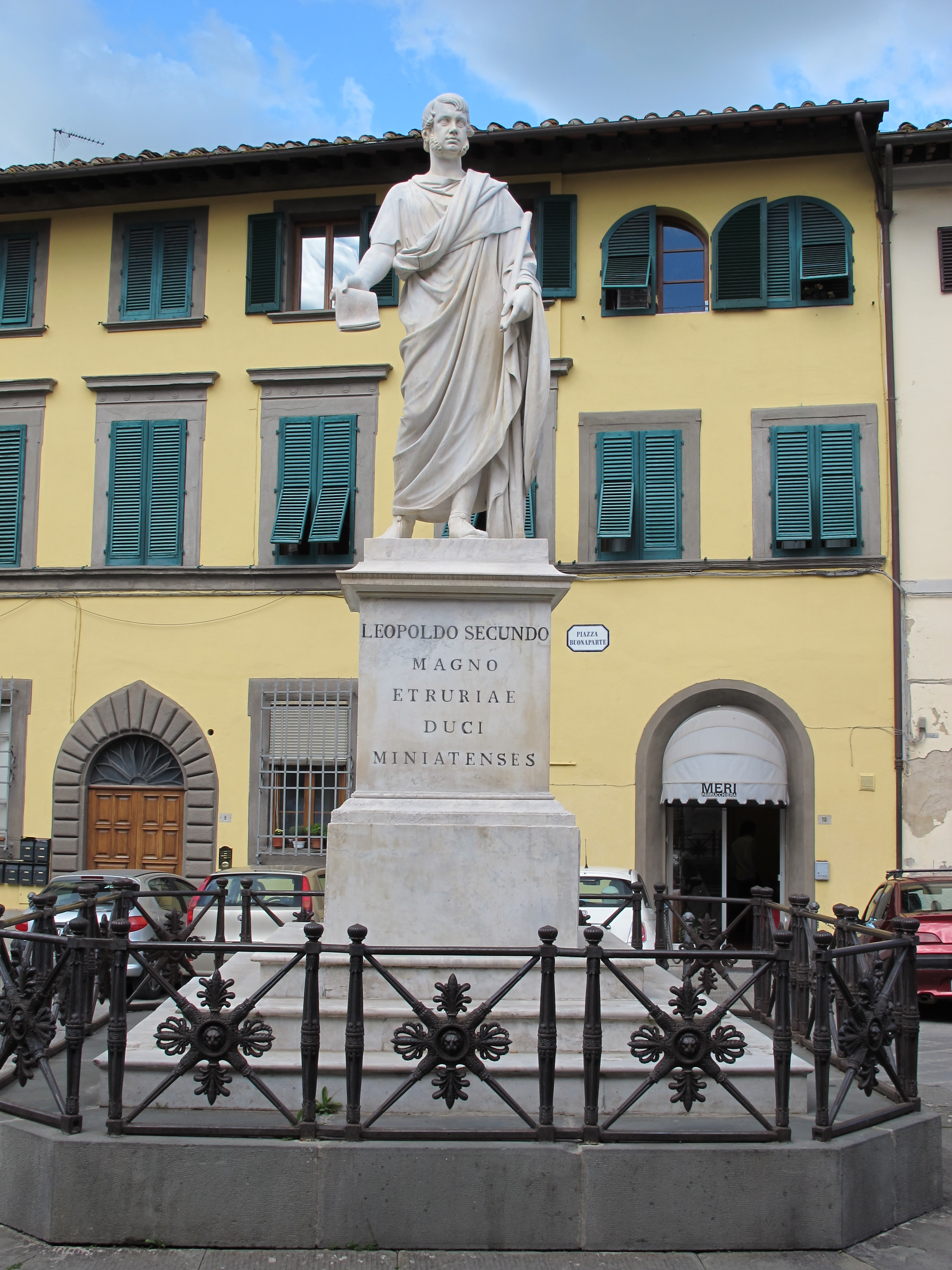
Leopold II, Piazza Buonaparte, San Miniato

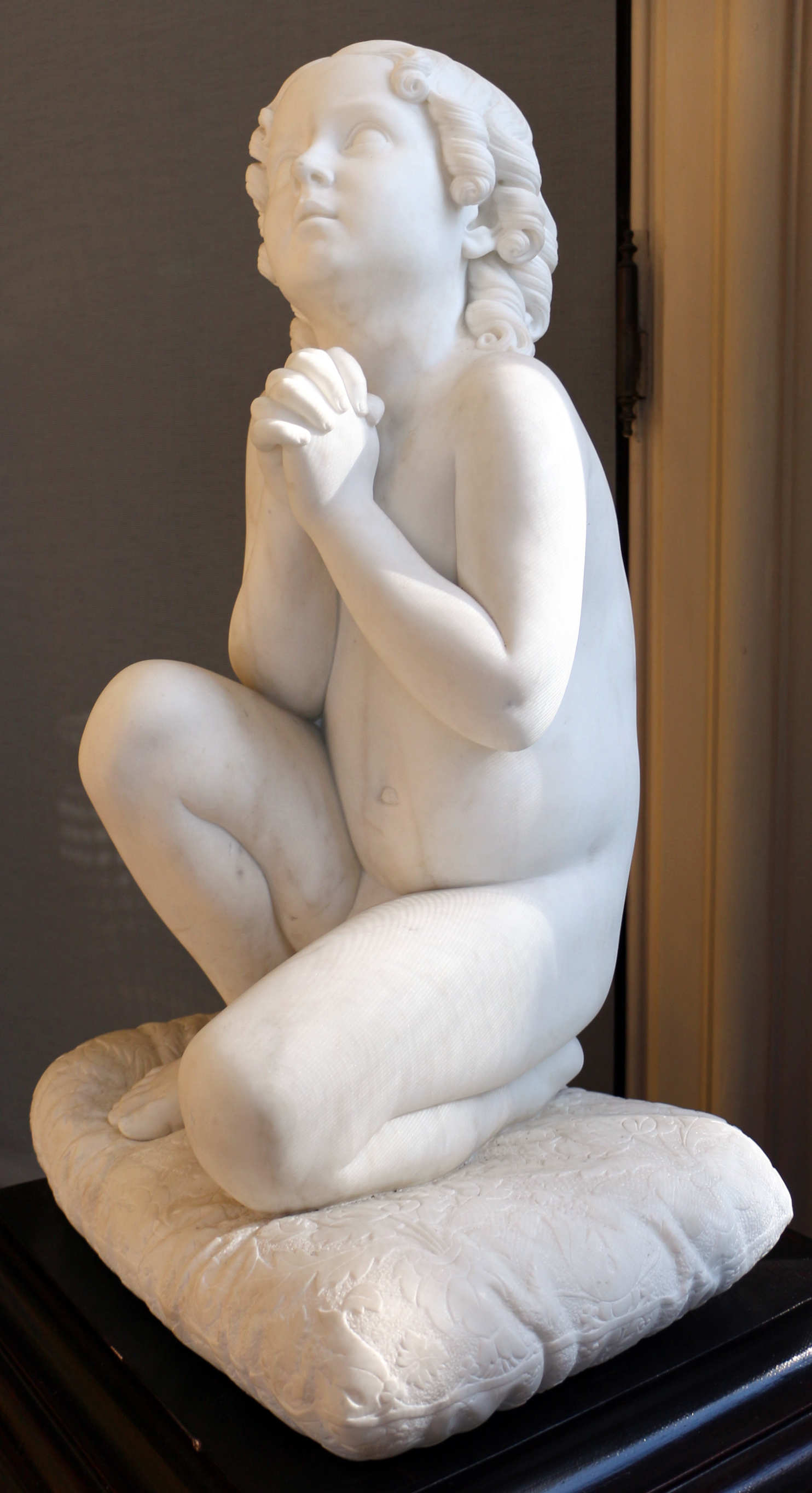
Kneeling child at prayer, Galleria d'Arte Moderna, Genoa-Nervi

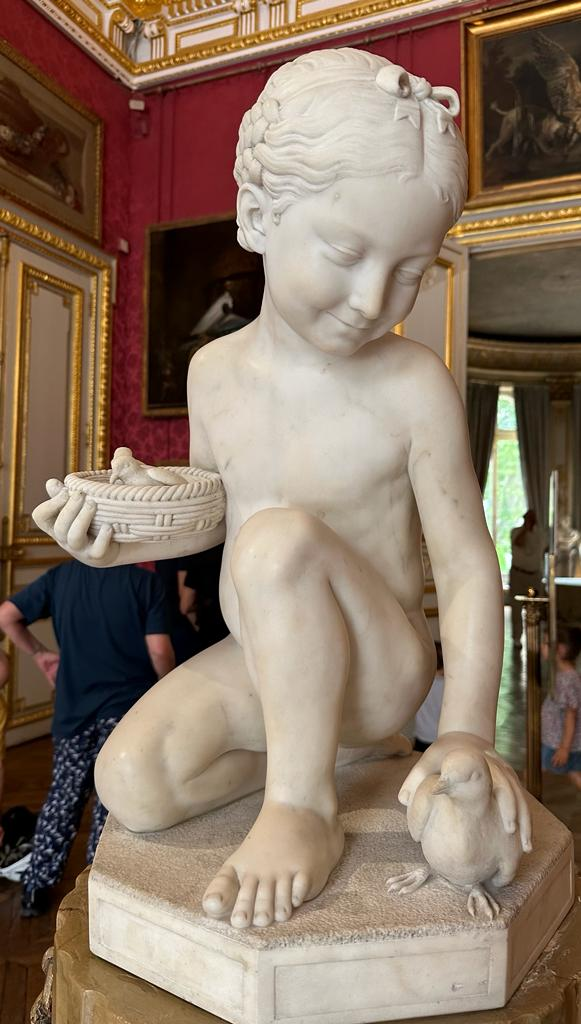
Kneeling girl with doves, Musée Jacquemart-André, Paris

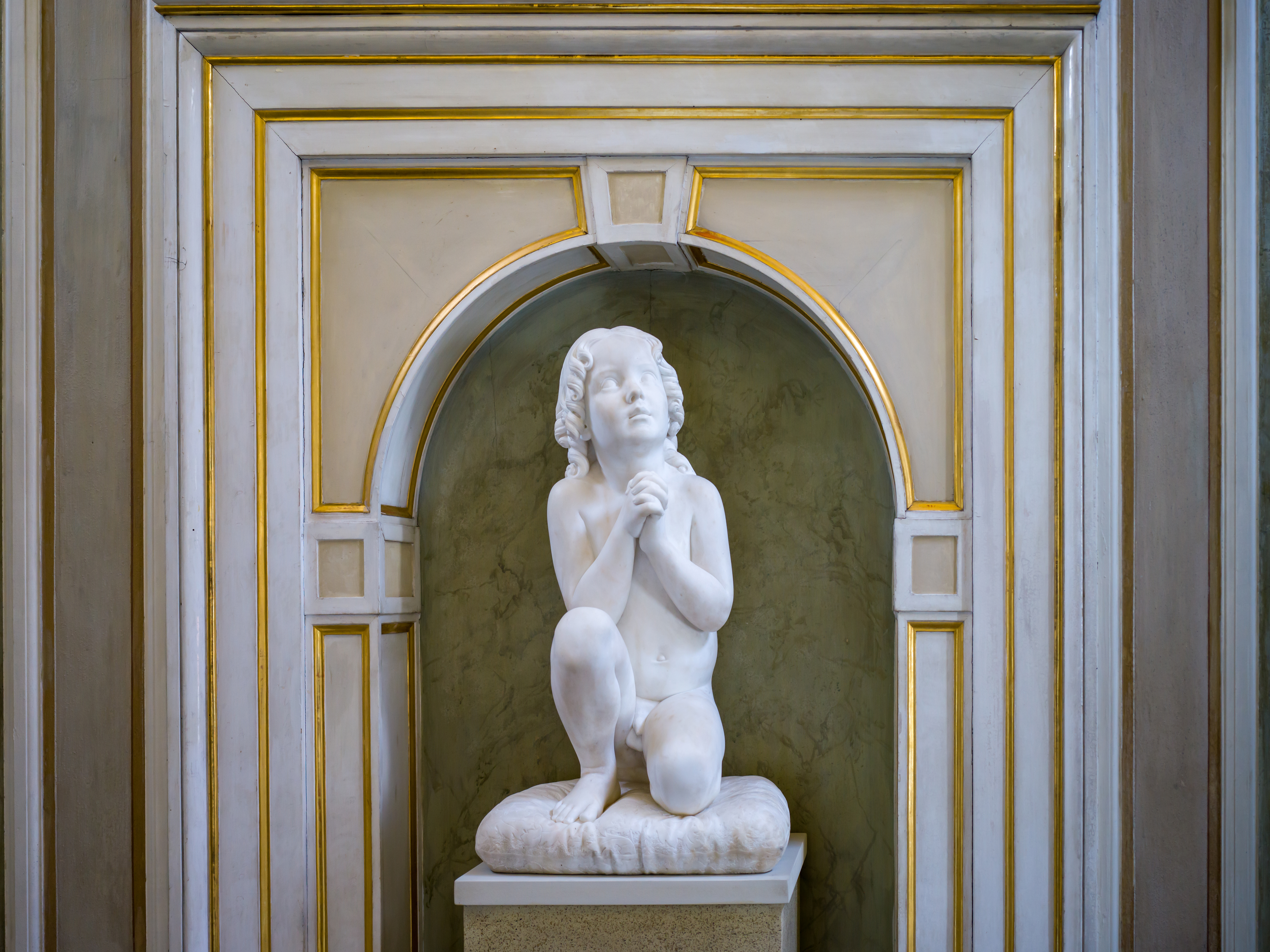
Kneeling child at prayer in the Palazzo Tosio, Brescia
