= Giovanni Dupré =

Italian sculptor

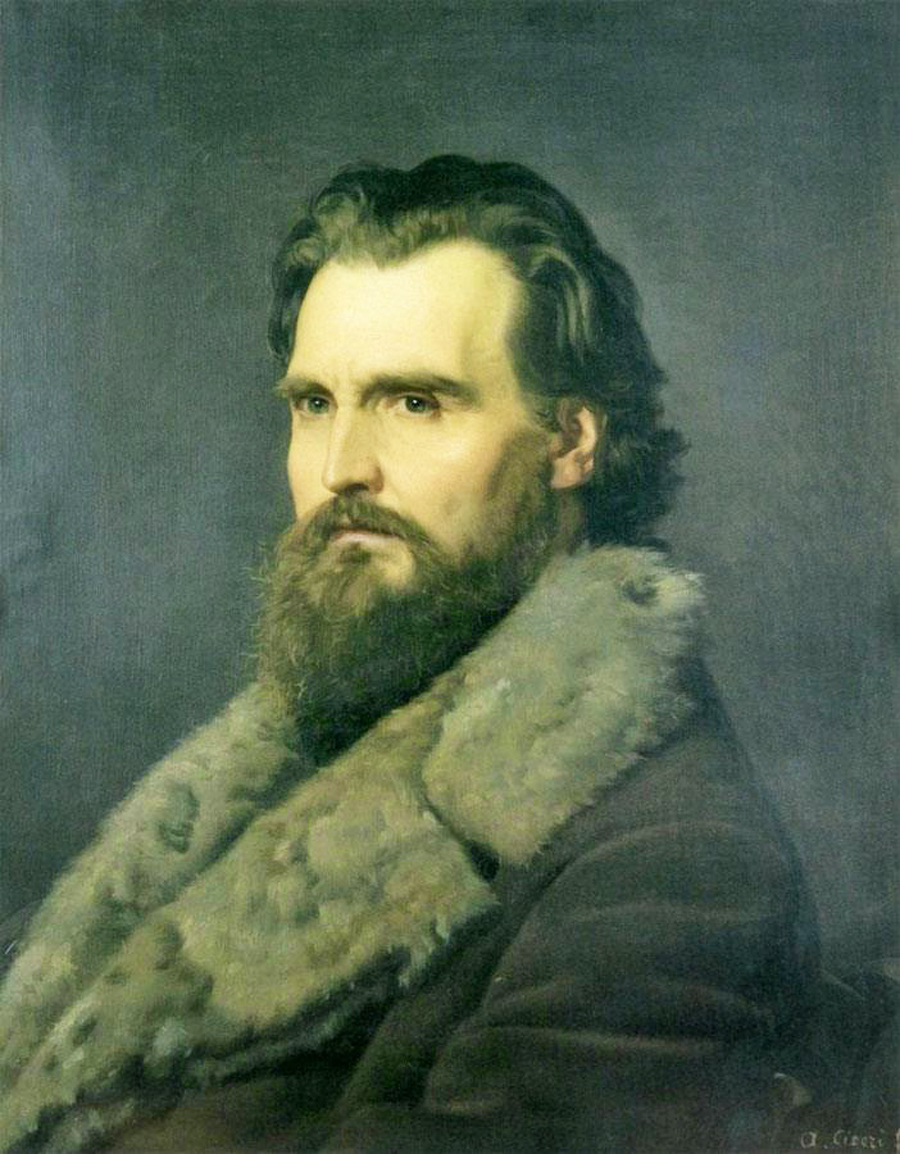
- Portrait of Giovanni Dupré by Antonio Ciseri
- Born: 1 March 1817; Siena, Tuscany, Italy
- Died: 10 January 1882 (aged 64); Florence, Tuscany, Italy
- Known for: Sculptor
- Movement: Neo-classical marble sculpture

Giovanni Dupré (1 March 1817 – 10 January 1882) was an Italian sculptor, of distant French stock long settled in Tuscany, who developed a reputation second only to that of his contemporary Lorenzo Bartolini.

== Biography ==
Born in Siena, Dupré began in his father's carving workshop and that of Paolo Sani, where he was occupied with producing fakes of Renaissance sculptures.

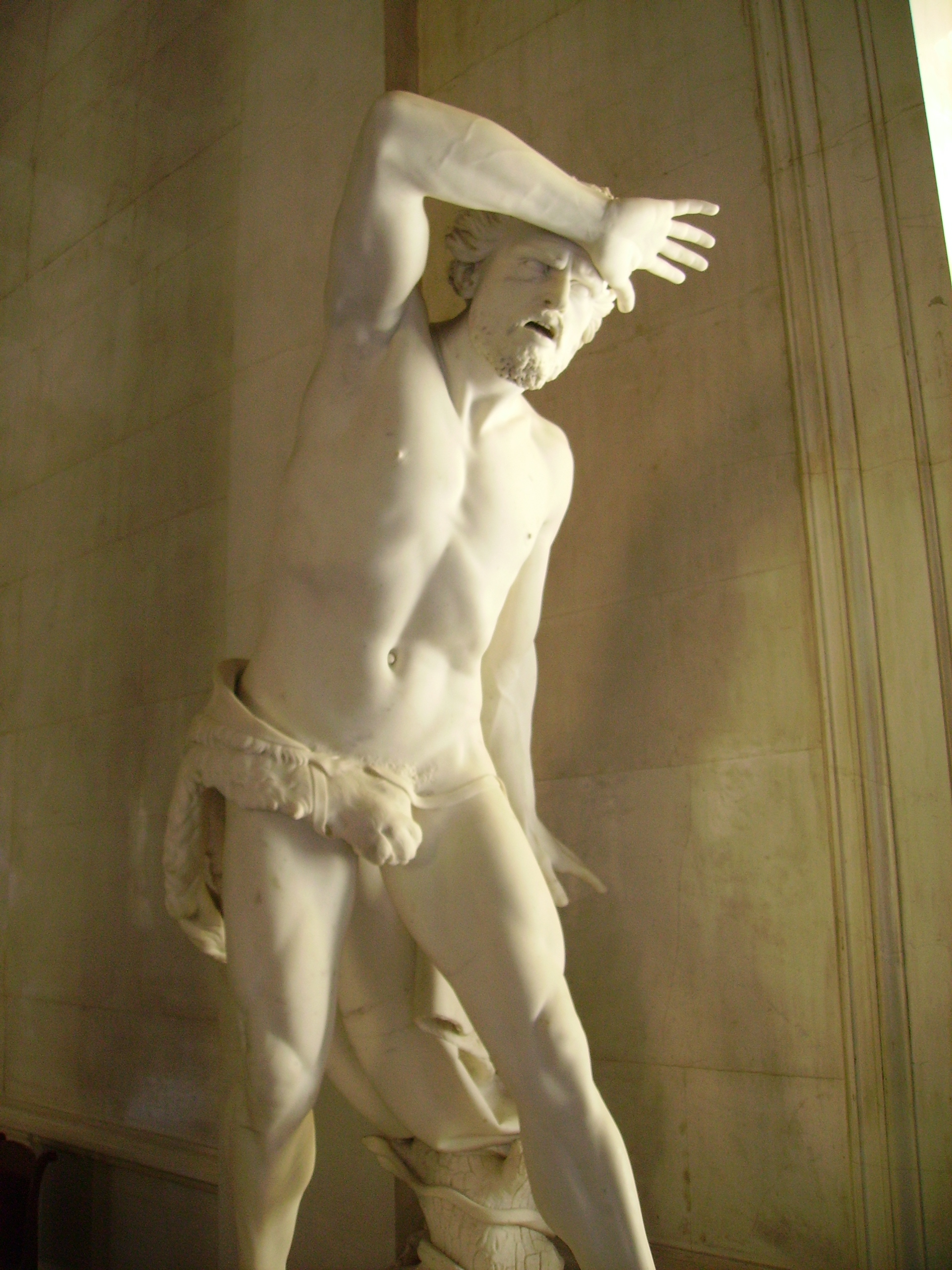
Cain (Hermitage Museum)

In an open contest run by the Accademia di Belle Arti, he won first prize with a Judgment of Paris and made his reputation with the life-size figure of the dead Abel (illustration, right), which was purchased for Grand Duchess Maria Nikolaievna, Duchess of Leuchtenberg (now at the Hermitage Museum, St. Petersburg) and was replicated in bronze, c. 1839, (now in the Galleria d'arte moderna, Palazzo Pitti, Florence). The raw naturalism of the figure, greeted with shock at the time, presaged the beginning of the end of Neoclassicism in Italian sculpture and gained Dupré the encouragement of Lorenzo Bartolini. He followed this with a more classical Cain (1840, also in marble at the Hermitage Museum and in bronze at the Pitti). He followed with figures of Giotto and Saint Antonino of Florence for façade niches on the Loggiato degli Uffizi, and a bust of Pius II for the Church of San Domenico (Siena) in Siena.

On a trip to Naples he passed through Rome and saw Antonio Canova's funeral monument to Pope Pius VI, which influenced his style in a classical direction. A period of ill-health was followed by renewed vigour, which resulted in the brooding and melancholy Sappho of 1857–61, with its Michelangelesque flavour (now in the Galleria Nazionale d'Arte Moderna in Rome); contemporary critics acclaimed it as his best work to date. In 1851 he was called upon to provide the model for the bronze base for the grand table inlaid in pietra dura with Apollo and the Muses, executed by the Grand Ducal Opificio delle pietre dure; Duprè's figures of the Seasons with putti was cast in bronze by Clemente Papi. The table stands in the Sala del Castagnoli, Palazzo Pitti. In 1859–64 he sculpted the funeral monument for contessa Berta Moltke Ferrari-Corbelli in the left transept of the Basilica of San Lorenzo, Florence. He followed it with the Putti dell'Uva (the "Grape Children"); the Madonna Addolorata for Santa Croce, Florence (1860), and the bas-relief of the Triumph of the Cross, accompanied by figures representing all the ages of Christianity, in a lunette over its main entrance.

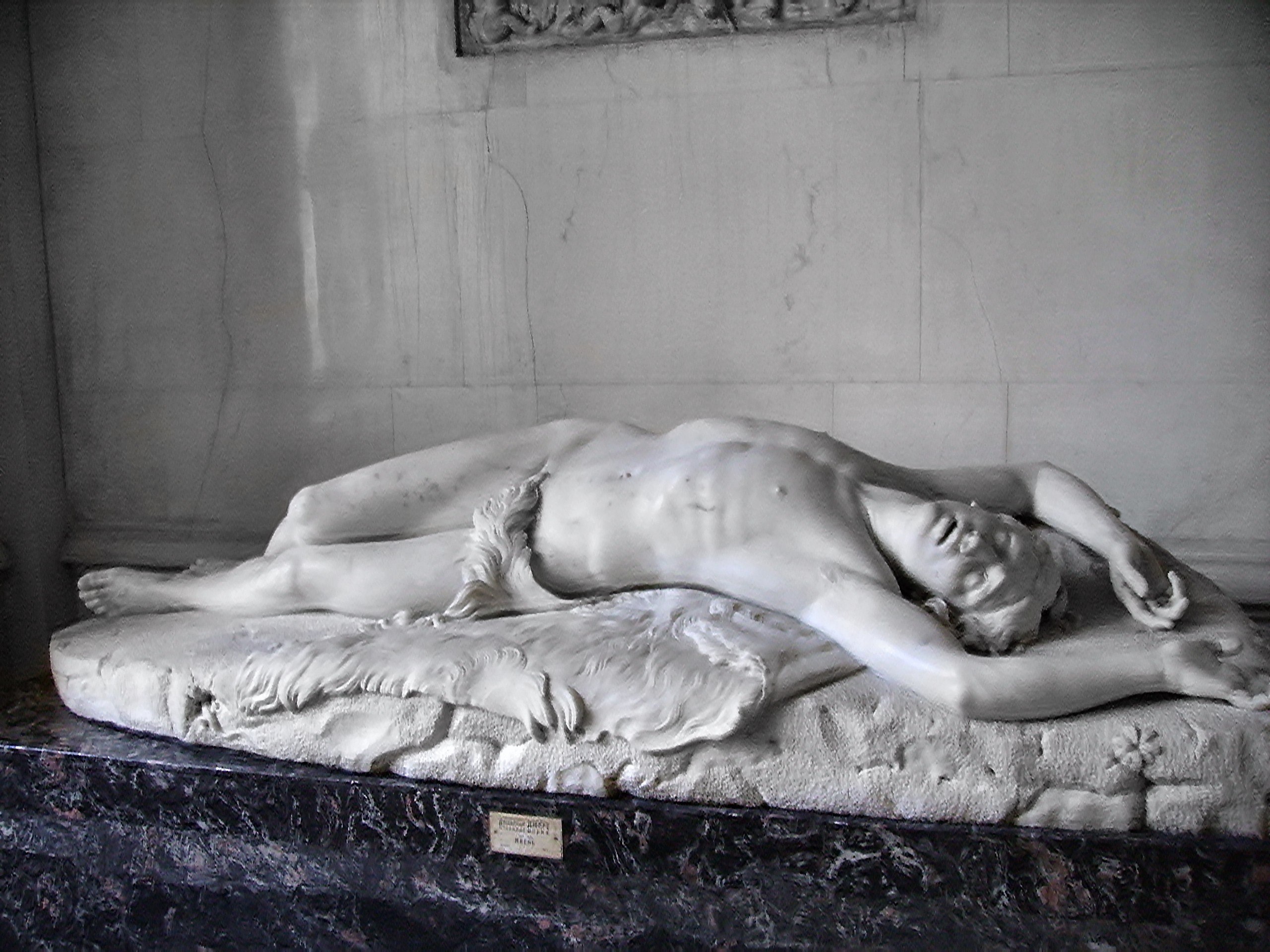
Abel, by Giovanni Dupré; (Hermitage Museum)

In 1863 Dupré created his finest work, the Pietà (1860–65), for the family tomb of the marchese Bichi-Ruspoli in the cemetery of Misericordia, Siena. This group was awarded the Grande medaille d'honneur at the International Exhibition in Paris. The San Zanobi for the façade of the Duomo di Siena, the Risen Christ for the Dupré memorial chapel, the colossal allegories of the Cavour monument in Turin (1872), the bronze bust of Savonarola set in his cell at the monastery of San Marco, Florence (1873), and a number of minor works complete the list of Dupré's productions.

His last work, the St. Francis inside the Cathedral of S. Rufino in Assisi, was finished by his eldest daughter and pupil, Amalia. Time failed him to execute the crowning figure of the Madonna for Santa Maria del Fiore. He died in Florence.

At the height of his reputation, he served on vetting juries for several international exhibitions.

His memoirs, Pensieri sull'arte e ricordi autobiografici (Florence, 1879, 2nd ed. Milan 1935) were translated into English by Edith Marion Story Peruzzi (Edinburgh, 1886), daughter of the American expatriate sculptor William Wetmore Story. Dupré's daughter Amalia achieved some reputation as a sculptor.

One of his students was Augusto Rivalta.

== Works and collections ==
Many works of Giovanni Dupré can be found gathered in two particular places in Tuscany. The recently closed Dupre Museum in Fiesole, a suburb of Florence was curated until recently by Dupre's relative Amalia Dupre.

The other significant treasury of Dupré works, a gipsoteca featuring plaster molds for many of his most famous marble sculptures including the Abel and two sculptures for the Loggia of the Uffizi, is held in the museum pertaining to Siena's Contrada dell'Onda in via Fontanella 1, and displayed since 1961 beneath the Contrada's Chapel.

Plaster molds held here include two works depicting Bacchus as a child: Bacco Festante and Bacco Dolente, a remarkably sensitive depiction of a female child with angel's wings praying called Angel of Prayer, Cain, Abel, various busts, and two group pieces each depicting one adult with two children. Two other funerary monuments depicting sleeping baby girls, of extraordinary sensitivity, comparable in delicacy with his Berta Ferrari monument in Basilica San Lorenzo in Florence, can be found in the Municipal Museum and the Museum of the Works of the Duomo in central Siena.
