= Tedald (bishop of Arezzo) =

Guido of Arezzo and Bishop Tedald working on a monochord

Tedald (c. 990 – 12 June 1036), also known as Theodald, Theodaldus, Tedaldus, Tedaldo, Teodaldus, Teodaltus, or Teodaldo, was the forty-third Bishop of Arezzo from 1023 until his death.

Tedald came from the highest ranks of the nobility of central Italy. He was the second son of Tedald, Count of Brescia, of the House of Canossa, and Willa, possible daughter of Theobald II of Spoleto. His elder brother was Boniface III of Tuscany. He was the uncle of Matilda of Tuscany, who was born after his death.

As bishop Tedald encouraged and protected the monastic life. He granted permission for Saint Romuald to found a monastery and a hermitage (eremo) at Camaldoli in his diocese (c. 1024). Tedald also sponsored the work of the monk Guido of Arezzo, whose treatise on music theory, the Micrologus, was dedicated to him. At Tedald's invitation, Guido took up the training of the cathedral singers at Arezzo around 1025. The bishop also supported the architect Maginardo, who added to the cathedral during his episcopate and was sent by Tedald in 1026 on a paid visit to Ravenna to study its Byzantine architecture.

He was succeeded in the diocese by Immo, a canon from Worms and chaplain at the court of Emperor Conrad II.
