= Loggiato of the Uffizi =

Coordinates: 43°46′06″N 11°15′20″E

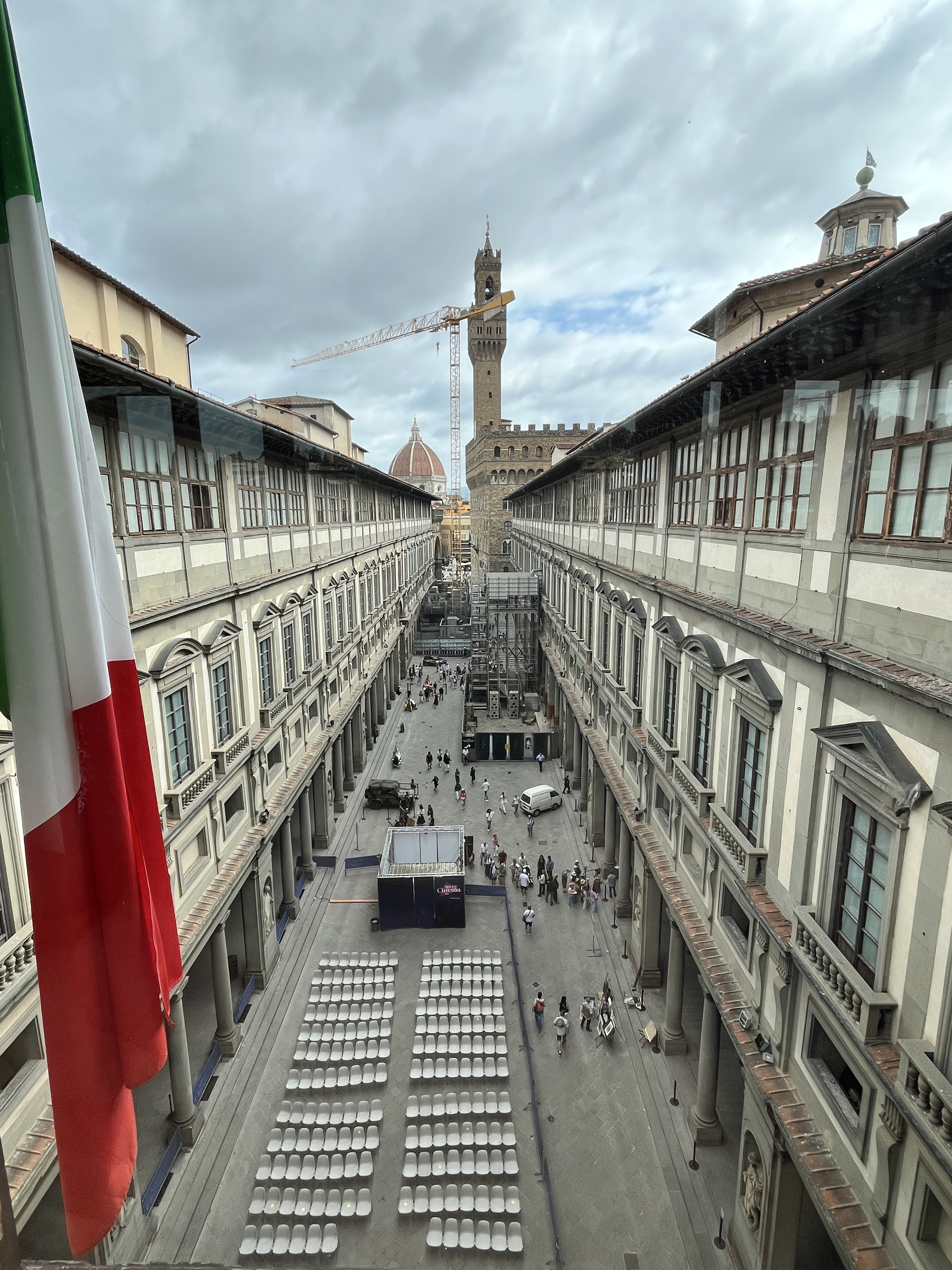
The Loggiato of the Uffizi while during construction

The Loggiato is the semi-enclosed courtyard (Italian: cortile) space between the two long galleries of the Uffizi Gallery located adjacent to the Piazza della Signoria in the historic center of Florence, capital of Tuscany, Italy. Because the facade of the arcaded corridor parallel to the Arno River also continues the sculptural display of the cortile, it can also be included in the description.

== History and description ==
In addition, to hosting the entrance to the museum housed in the upper galleries, the loggiato is known for its display of statues of famous Tuscans housed in niches carved from the inner ground floor pilasters. It is stated that Cosimo I de Medici for his original plan for the Uffizi planned to display statues of famous Tuscans in the ground floor. In 1574, just before the death of Cosimo, the sculptor Vincenzo Danti had his statue of the former Duke placed in the ground floor. His son, Francesco, in 1584 substituted this statue with one by Giambologna, standing on a plinth on the second floor, above the arches of the interior of the river corridor, with Cosimo flanked by two figures, Rigor and Equity. However, not until the middle of the 19th century, was such an ambitious plan to display a statues of 28 famous Italians active in Tuscany was put into effect.

The project was restarted in 1834–1835 as an initiative of the editor and philanthropist Vincenzo Batelli, who wished to celebrate the Italian genius. Initially, he hoped to fund his project with a public subscription and engage young local artists, early in their careers. Public funding, however, fell far short of what was needed. In 1842, the Grand-Ducal government selected a "Florentine Deputation to complete the decoration of the Logge degli Uffizi and honor Illustrious Tuscans". The deputation selected the subjects and approved the statues based on designs with no modifications allowed. Their choices guided by the government of the Grand-Duchy. For example, the suggestions for including Frate Guittone d'Arezzo (1230 – 1294) and the jurist Cino da Pistoia (1270 – 1336) were declined. Ultimately the project was funded by a lottery, and experienced sculptors were patronized. Prior to installation or completion of the statues following sculptors died: Bartolini, Pampaloni, Pozzi, Nencini, Leoni, and Torrini. The original sculptor for the statue of Guicciardini declined the commission, believing the historian had not been evil.^{?!} The series was completed in 1856.

Starting in the northeast corner, closest to the Palazzo della Signoria, are two statues flanking an entrance: the statues of Cosimo and Lorenzo (1 and 2). In the courtyard pilasters, the niches begin with Andrea Orcagna (3), and followed by Nicola Pisano, and proceeding clockwise along courtyard as described in the list below. The statues 16-19 are on the Arno facade of the Loggiato.

== Sculptures in the Loggiato ==
Number location	Person	Statue	Sculptor
1	Cosimo Pater Patriae	Statesman	Luigi Magi
2	Lorenzo De Medici	Statesman	Gaetano Grazzini
3	Andrea Orgagna	Architect	Niccolo Bazzanti
4	Nicola Pisano	Sculptor	Pio Fedi
5	Giotto	Painter	Giovanni Dupre
6	Donatello	Sculptor	Girolamo Torrini
7	Leon Battista Alberti	Architect	Giovanni Lusini
8	Leonardo da Vinci	Artist	Luigi Pampaloni
9	Michelangelo Buonarroti	Artist	Emilio Santarelli
10	Dante Alighieri	Poet	Emilio Demi
11	Francesco Petrarca	Poet	Andrea Leoni
12	Giovanni Boccaccio	Author	Cesare Fantacchiotti
13	Niccolò Machiavelli	Political theorist	Lorenzo Bartolini
14	Francesco Guicciardini	Historian	Luigi Carta
15	Amerigo Vespucci	Cartographer	Gaetano Grazzini
16	Farinata degli Uberti	Condotiero	Francesco Pozzi (sculptor)
17	Pier Capponi	Statesman	Torello Bicci
18	Giovanni dalle Bande Nere	Condottiero	Temistocle Guerrazzi
19	Francesco Ferruccio	Condottiero	Pasquale Romanelli
20	Galileo Galilei	Astronomer	Aristodemo Costoli
21	Pier Antonio Micheli	Botanist	Vincenzo Consani
22	Franceso Redi	Anatomist	Pietro Costa
23	Paolo Mascagni	Anatomist	Lodevico Caselli
24	Andrea Cesalpino	Physiologist	Pio Fedi
25	St Antonino	Theologian	Giovanni Dupre
26	Accorso	Jurist	Cesare Fantacchiotti
27	Guido Aretino	Musical theorist	Lorenzo Nencini
28	Benvenuto Cellini	Artist	Ulisse Cambi

== Critical evaluation ==
Some of statues were positioned aptly: the Medici stand guard over the entrance to the building: Orcagna gazes on his main architectural project the Loggia dei Lanzi in front of the Signoria, while Cellini's statue is placed nearest to the city's former mint (Zecca), where he engraved some medals for the Medici. The warriors and defenders of Florence, Fainata, Ferrucio, Capponi, and Delle Bande Nere; all stand vigil on the Arno side of the building. Their choices must have been difficult for the Lorraine government seeking to portray themselves as defenders of the Tuscan territory.

In other statues, the wit is more subtly expressed: Galileo looks at the heavens, Dante glares at the Florentines that condemned him to step into exile; while Farinata, who was condemned by Dante to the Inferno, stares off to a distance lowering his sword toward the shield bearing the heraldic lily of the Florence he defended against his fellow Ghibellines. Unlike Farinata, Giovanni dalle Bande Nere unsheaves his sword. The statue of Cellini, always the strutter of his passions, is constructed with both stone and metal. It is stated that the statue of Michelangelo, who backed the republican efforts, shows him refusing to build a fortress for Alessandro de Medici. Contemporary critics complained that Giotto seemed too realistic and St Anthony appeared asleep.

The entire project was completed by mainly foreign Lorraine dynasty, which had long sought to represent autochthony, but which in a few years (1848) would face transient exile by republicans, followed in a few years by permanent banishment and condemnation that some of these famous Tuscans also experienced.
