= Micrologus =

Medieval music treatise by Guido of Arezzo

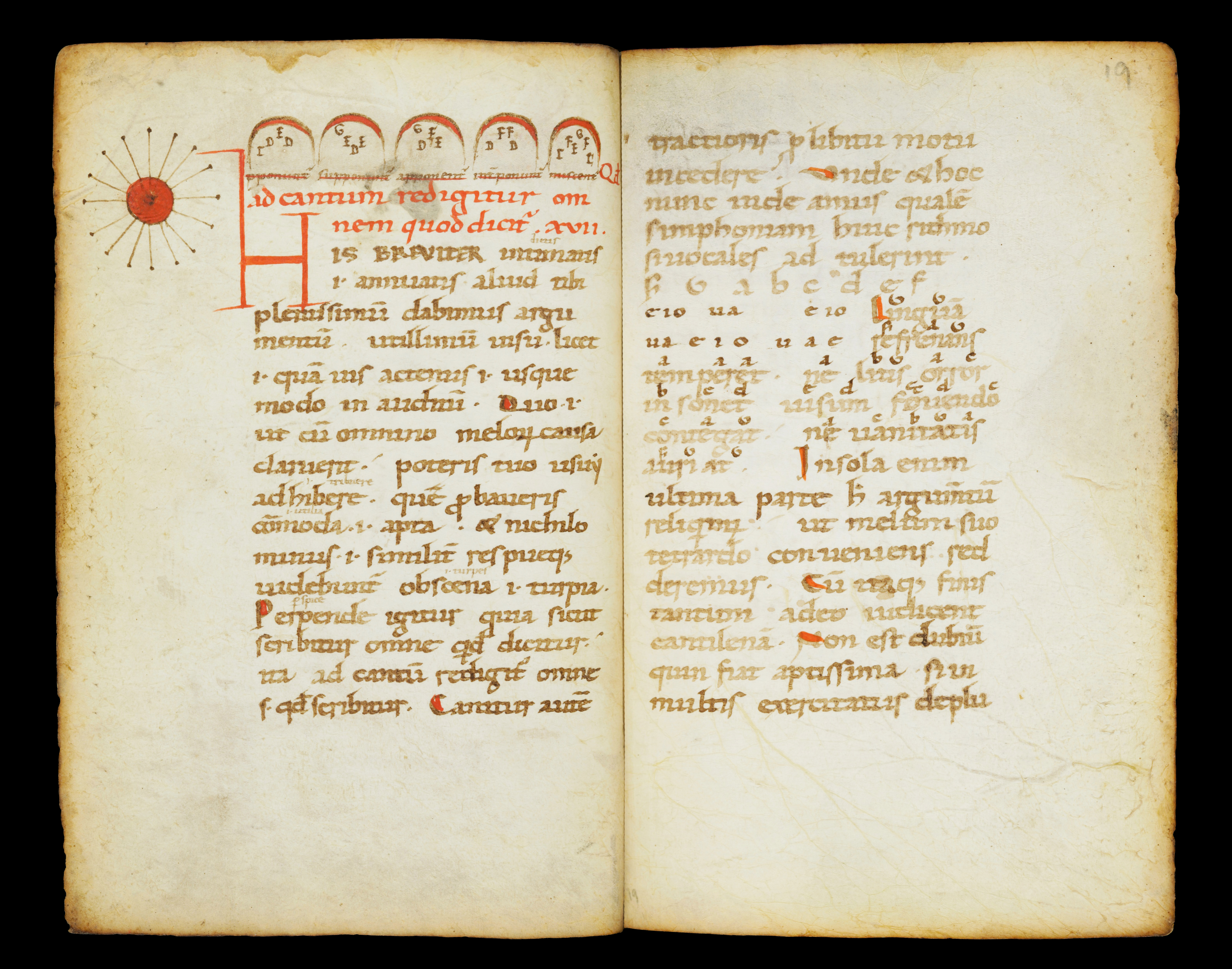
Micrologus by Guido of Arezzo excerpt from a 12th-century manuscript.

The Micrologus is a treatise on Medieval music written by Guido of Arezzo, dating to approximately 1026. It was dedicated to Tedald, Bishop of Arezzo. This treatise outlines singing and teaching practice for Gregorian chant, and has considerable discussion of the composition of polyphonic music.

This treatise discusses modified parallel organum as well as free organum. The examples given are in two voices, set note-against-note, and the voices are frequently permitted to cross. He advised against use of the perfect fifth and minor second, favouring instead the major second and perfect fourth (though thirds were also permitted).

One point of importance is his guideline for the occursus (meaning "meeting" or "concurrence", running on the same path), which is a predecessor of the later cadence. An occursus occurs where two voices approach a unison. He suggested that the unison should be approached either by contrary motion from a major third, or oblique motion from a major second.
