= Fourth (music) =

In music, a fourth is an interval spanning four staff positions in the musical notation common in Western culture.

Specific fourth intervals include:

- Perfect fourth, the fourth spanning five semitones
- Diminished fourth, a perfect fourth narrowed by a chromatic semitone, thus spanning four semitones
- Augmented fourth or tritone, an interval of three adjacent whole tones (six semitones)

In addition, fourth in music may refer to:

- Quartal harmony, harmonic structures built from the perfect fourth, the augmented fourth and the diminished fourth
- Subdominant, the fourth tonal degree of the diatonic scale
