= Howson =

Howson is a surname. Notable people with the surname include:

- Howson family, show business dynasty
- Albert G. Howson (1931–2022) English mathematician
- Albert S. Howson (1881–1960), American actor
- Charles Howson (1896–1976), English footballer
- Colin Howson (1945–2020), British philosopher
- Emma Howson (1844–1928), Australian opera singer and actress
- Frank Howson (1952–2024), Australian film director and producer
- George Howson (headmaster) (1860–1919), English educationalist
- George Arthur Howson (1886–1936), British Army officer
- Helena Kaut-Howson, British theatre and opera director
- Herb Howson (1872–1948), Australian rules footballer
- James Howson (1856–1934), English churchman
- Joan Howson (1885–1964), British stained glass artist
- John Howson (bishop) (c.1557–1632), English bishop
- John Howson (priest) (1816–1885), English divine
- John-Michael Howson (born 1936), Australian writer
- Jonny Howson (born 1988), English footballer
- Peter Howson (born 1958), Scottish painter
- Peter Howson (politician) (1919–2009), Australian politician
- Richard Howson (born 1968), British businessman
- Richie Howson (born 1965), English darts player
- Scott Howson (born 1960), Canadian ice hockey player
- Sean Howson (born 1981), Montserratian footballer
- Spencer Howson (born 1972), Australian radio presenter
- Susan Howson (mathematician) (born 1973), British mathematician
- Susan Howson (economist) (born 1945), Canadian economist
- William Howson (disambiguation), various people

- William R. Howson (1883–1952), Canadian politician and judge
- William Howson (footballer) (1892–?), English footballer

== See also ==
- Howison
