= Sara Flower =

British-born Australian contralto and opera singer

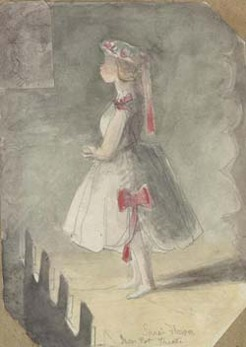
Sara Elizabeth Flower

Sara Elizabeth Flower (21 October 1820–20 August 1865) was a British-born contralto singer who became Australia's first opera star. She began a musical career in London in the 1840s before emigrating to Australia in 1849. In 1852, she appeared in Sydney in the first production in Australia of Bellini's opera Norma.

== Life ==
Sara Elizabeth Flower was born in the English market town of Grays, Essex, situated on the River Thames at the edge of the Tilbury marshes. In 1821, Grays had a population of 742, supporting six public houses. Flower's maternal grandfather, Daniel Granger, owned The Rising Sun public house. The nearby Belmont Castle was a strong influence on regional music.

=== Family ===
Flower's father was William Lewis Flower (c.1800-1847), recorded in the Essex Directory in 1823 as a draper, grocer, and Phoenix Fire & Life agent. To claim the status of a gentleman, he later stated he had "no occupation" once his daughter gained admittance to the Royal Academy of Music in 1841.

Robert Flower (c.1779-1832), Flower's uncle, was a foreman of the local brickworks in 1824. He was described as a yeoman in local parish records from 1817, and likely came from an earlier lineage of tenant farmers or small proprietors. This drop in social status was likely caused by changes brought about by the enclosure movement after the Napoleonic Wars.

Her mother, Ruth Flower, was the daughter of local Grays publican, Daniel Granger. Little is known about her, though she may have been the prototype for the mother of a fictional opera singer whose sad fate stood prophetically foretold in Alice Diehl's first published novel, Garden of Eden.

Flower had a brother, believed to be George Flower (died 16 July 1890), manager of the Commercial Bank in Muswellbrook c. 1867–1890, whose earlier occupation is not known.

Flower had an older sister named Elizabeth, a soprano who also pursued a singing career. During the 1840s, the sisters gained recognition for their performances as a duo, often appearing in concerts in London. They sang to much acclaim, and Sara especially was noted for her remarkable voice. In 1847, Elizabeth married a prominent lawyer called Timms Augustine Sargood and subsequently withdrew from public life. Nevertheless, the couple hosted a musical circle in the 1860s at their home in London's Bloomsbury district (Gordon Square). Guests included concert pianist Diehl, whom Elizabeth recounted in two autobiographical works.

Sara and Elizabeth were frequently mistaken for Sarah Fuller Flower Adams and Eliza Flower, the daughters of the political writer Benjamin Flower who were also known for their talents as a poet and a composer, respectively. This confusion persisted throughout Sara's life and even after her death. Although there is no evidence establishing a connection between the two families, there were notable similarities in their economic, social, and regional backgrounds.

=== Education and training ===
From late October 1841, Flower trained at the Royal Academy of Music (R.A.M) under Domenico Crivelli (1794–1857). Crivelli was educated by his father, singer Gaetano Crivelli (1774–1836), in techniques of Italian castrati. Crivelli's knowledge of the exploitation of falsetto may account for Flower's protean ability to cross the entire range of the operatic singing voice. In Bellini's Norma, her range spread from the dramatic soprano of Norma to the mezzo of Analgias, in addition to the tenor role of Pollioni.

=== Early career ===
Flower first came to public notice within London's Psalmody Movement of the 1830s and 40s. The movement was associated with such names as Sarah Ann Glover, John Hullah, and John Curwen. It had solid Independent or Congregationalist non-conformist religious leanings and powerful utilitarian sociology. On 4 November 1839, The Musical World noted that Flower and her sister had both appeared at a lecture by Charles Henry Purday (1799–1885) at the Hoxton National School Room in inner North London. Purday was known for his theories on "The Proper Object of Music."

London circles believed Flower connected with John Hullah's classes in London's Exeter Hall. They also believed Flower was associated with "Music for the Million," the singing school of Joseph Mainzer (1801–1851), which had been modelled on the monitorial method of Guillaume Louis Bocquillon Wilhem [1781–1842] and his 'Orphéon' choral fests. These fests included teaching, often illiterate, working people to sight-sing from notation sheets as a non-conformist socio-religious project to revitalize music education in the Anglican Church.

Contrary to conjecture around deeper links to non-conformism or the Psalmody Movement, a post-1847 Flower family memorial plaque on the walls of the Grays parish church of St Peter and St Paul does not suggest any strong non-conformist link, nor does her R.A.M. career under the dictatorial rule of its president, John Fane, Lord Burghersh (1784–1859).

=== British professional career ===
Around 4 November 1839, she assisted C. H. Purday in presenting a lecture titled "The Proper Object of Music" at the Hoxton National School Room, London. On 29 October 1841, the Royal Academy of Music, London admitted Flower as a student of singing.

Her operatic debut was on 7 January 1843 at the Theatre Royal, Drury Lane, as the peasant Pippo in Macready's concert version of Rossini's La gazza ladra, starring Sabilla Novello as Annette. From 17 April 1843 Flower performed in Rossini's Tancredi at the Princess's Theatre, appearing in the titular role. Flower would continue working at the Princess's Theatre, reprising the role of Pippo in a production of La gazza Iadra in 17 July 1843 with a full orchestra alongside Emma Albertazzi as Annette. She played Adina in Donizetti's L'elisir d'amore, from 11 October 1843, with Paul Bedford as Dulcamara and Rebecca Isaacs as Floretta. She would make a few appearances on the concert stage before leaving for Italy to continue her studies.

Upon her return to London, she made a series of appearances at the Princess's Theatre: as Bertha in Edward Loder's Night Dancers alongside Emma Albertazzi as Giselle from 28 October 1846; as Ernestine in George Rodwell's Seven Maids of Munich from 19 December 1846; in Donizetti's Anna Bolena as Smeaton on 12 January 1847, starring Louisa Bassano in the lead role; in Mendelssohn's Midsummer Night's Dream as Oberon from 23 April 1847; and as Donna Olympia in Loder's The Young Guard, starring Anna Thillon from 20 January 1848. Flower also participated in several concerts at the Surrey Zoological Gardens, Louis-Antoine Jullien's Concerts Monstre on 24 July 1848 and 28 September 1848.

Around this time, she was a corps musicale member attending the ninth General Theatrical Fund reunion held at the London Tavern, Bishopsgate Street, chaired by Sir Edward Bulwer-Lytton and supported by Charles Dickens.

Flower emigrated to Australia on the migrant ship Clifton, which left London on 14 November 1849.

=== Life in Australia ===
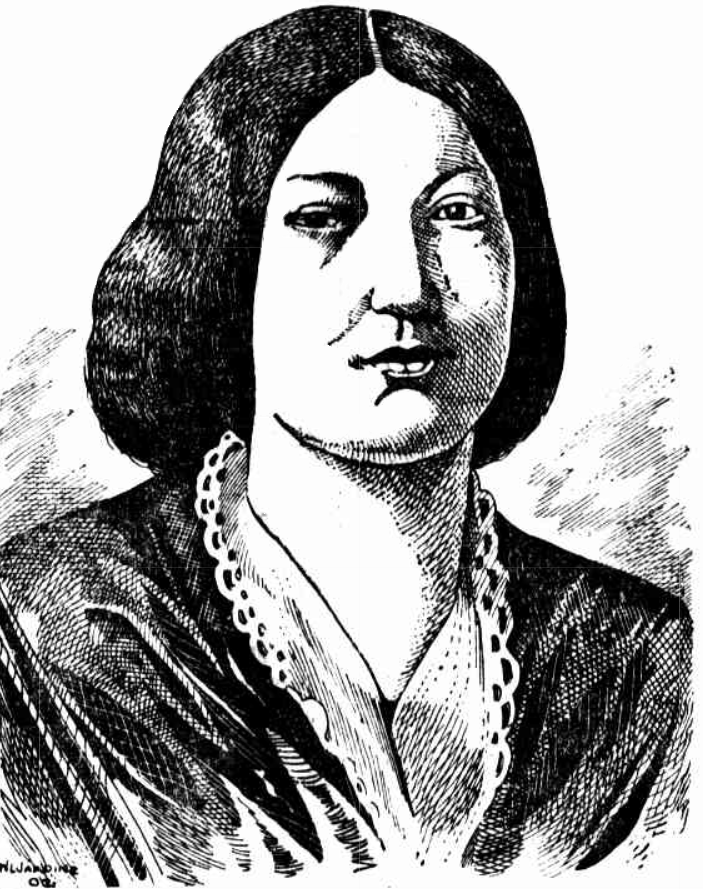
Sara Flower, from an oil painting

Clifton was the largest of three emigrant ships chartered by John Dunmore Lang, weighing 867 tons and commanded by E. W. Beasley. The ship arrived in Port Phillip from London with some 200 emigrants, mostly from Evangelical churches. Lang was one of the 20-some-odd cabin passengers and it is assumed that Flower travelled in steerage.

Her first Australian performance for Reed in Melbourne, at the Mechanics' Institute on 28 February 1850, was advertised as her only Melbourne appearance, as she was to continue to Sydney aboard Clifton. However, her contingent persuaded Flower to appear again for Reed at the Queen's Theatre on 26 March and proceed to Sydney aboard the ship Asia, where she was to join her brother, George. On 15 April 1850, Flower arrived and made her first Sydney appearance at the Victoria Theatre on 3 May 1850 for S. and H. Marsh.

Sara Flower married Samuel Howard Taylor of Sydney on 20 December 1851. He turned to the stage in 1855 as Sam Howard, low comedian.

She was the first Norma in Australia. Two characters in which she made a great impression were Azucena in Il trovatore and Maffio Orsini in Lucrezia Borgia.

=== Later years ===
She suffered from rheumatism in her last years and could not take students. She died destitute but proud at her residence, 137 Victoria Street, Woolloomooloo, on 20 August 1865. Her body was interred at the old Devonshire Street Cemetery the following day; a single coach carried her mourners. Her remains were later transferred to the new cemetery at La Perouse, where a group of enthusiasts placed a monument on her grave.

== Voice ==
Various British and Australian newspaper reports of the period describe Flower's voice and vocal affect with terms such as volume; melody; compass; resonance; sonorousness; simplicity; cultivation; powerful; exquisite; flexible; rich; full; distinct; nervous; rare; delicious; sweet; mellow; liquid; welling; gushing; wonderful; expressive; clear; enchanting; perfect; delightful; wonderful; extraordinary; thrilling; electrifying; melancholy; noble; pure; magnificent; splendid; glorious; astonishing; commanding; great; masterly; force of expression; sensation; harmony; charm; liveliness; ease; heart-pathos; depth of feeling; emotional power; tenderness; a host in itself; divine; beyond praise; heaven; a treasure; the great contralto.

On 7 January 1843, Sara Flower made her anonymous London debut in an opera at Drury Lane as an all-but non-singing Felix (Pippo) to Sabilla Novello's Annette (the youngest daughter of music publisher Vincent Novello) in a hybrid Macready production of Rossini's opera La gazza ladra (The Thieving Magpie). A critic characterized the opera as "[L]ittle more than a melodrama with a few airs interspersed." A review of Sara's recitative introduction in a duet role with Annette in "Ebben, per mia memoria" reported her positive reception:

Her notes were so exceedingly full and rich, her articulation so admirable, rare qualities in an English singer of recitative, that the audience were literally taken by surprise, and uttered loud and continuous applause, which was frequently reiterated as the very superior quality of her voice was exhibited in the course of the duet.

The reviewer described her voice then as, "a mezzo-soprano of singular volume, with some excellent contralto notes, which she touches with firmness." The unusual review went beyond the norm of describing the voice and covered the reaction of an audience that cried out spontaneously over a few bars of recitative.

Contemporary London's comment associated Flower's voice with that of Marietta Brambilla (1807–1875), possessing a "contralto voice of [...] delicious voluptuous quality." Six years later in Australia, Flower's voice was described as being "like one of those boy voices that one meets with once in one's life and remembers forever after, so clear, so full, and nervous, and of such volume and compass."

== Notes and references ==
- Beedell, A.V. 2000, 'Terminal Silence: Sara Flower and the Diva Enigma: Explorations of Voice and the Maternal in Operatic Experience in Colonial Australian History ca. 1850-1865' in 2 volumes. PhD Faculty of Arts, Griffith University, Queensland.
- Diehl, Alice [1897] Musical Memories, (London)
- Diehl, Alice [1905] The True Story of My Life. An Autobiography, (London)
- Grove's Dictionary of Music and Musicians 1961, 5th ed. edited by Eric Blom (London, Macmillan)
- Gyger, Alison, "Flower, Sara Elizabeth", Australian Dictionary of Biography, Online Edition (accessed 18 January 2010)
- Musical World (London 1836-91)
- Poizat, Michel 1992, The Angel's Cry. Beyond the Pleasure Principle in Opera, trans. Arthur Denner (Ithaca and London)
- Rainbow, Bernarr 1970, The Choral Revival in the Anglican Church (1839–1872). (London, Barrie & Jenkins)
- Stendhal (Henri Beyle) 1956 [1824] Life of Rossini trans. Richard N. Coe, London
- Times, The (London)

== External references ==
- 'Cowgill, Rachel and Peter Holman 2007, Music in the British Provinces 1690-1914 (Ashgate)
- 'Thurrock Heritage - Factfiles [Alice Diehl]' www.thurrock.gov.uk/heritage
- [https://www.monumentaustralia.org/themes/people/arts/display/21784-sara-flower monumentaustralia.org.au]
