= Houison =

Houison is a surname. Notable people with the surname include:

- Andrew Houison (1850–1912), Australian medical practitioner, amateur historian, and philatelist
- Rod Houison, English musician, producer, and sound engineer

== See also ==
- Howison
