= Psalmody Movement =

Cultural phenomenon of mass musical education

The Psalmody Movement is a general term often used to cover a period of mass musical education in Britain. It is sometimes also referred to as the "choral revival". It had its roots in the dissenting congregational church singing organisations of the late 18th century, in Scotland and Northern England. By the mid-19th century, it had become a metropolitan cultural institution. It coincided also with developments in national schools policy, which owed much to the teaching methods used by the psalmody singing schools.

In Bernarr Rainbow's words:

As a result of the series of weekly massed singing classes introduced at Exeter Hall under government sanction, the people of London became more musically conscious between 1841 and 1843 than they had ever been.

The names most often associated with the movement' in Britain are John Curwen (1816–1880), Sarah Ann Glover (1785–1867) and John Pyke Hullah (1812–84). It had its roots in continental Europe, however, particularly in the social idealism of Johann Heinrich Pestalozzi.

Already known for his work among working men in Paris, Joseph Mainzer (1801–1851) came to England in 1841 with his Singing for the Million ideal of opening up musical education to the masses. Hullah had already established his own successful classes in London at Exeter Hall. They were based on the system of popular musical education through choral singing devised by Paris School Inspector and musician, Guillaume Wilhem, the founder of the 'Orphéon' choral fests which had rapidly spread throughout France. Hullah's program had initially been designed as a school for the instruction of music masters of day and Sunday schools, but proved to be popular among the general public who flocked to Exeter Hall.
