= Dinah Rudelhoff =

Australian stage actor and theatre manager

Dinah Rudelhoff (d. after 1845), was an Australian stage actor and theatre manager. She was one of the first female theatre managers in Australia: the second one to manage a theatre after Cordelia Cameron.

She arrived in Tasmania just one year after the introduction of professional theater in Tasmania by the travelling company of Samson and Cordelia Cameron from England, and only two years after the first professional theatre performance in Australia (at Barnett Levey's Royal Hotel in Sydney in December 1832), making her one of the first professional actors active in Australia. She was given one of the highest wages on the theatre, making her an elite actor in Australia at the time.

She and another actress, Anne Clarke (later director of the Theatre Royal in 1840), was advertised to appear on stage in Hobart that summer, and were both referred to as experienced actors: "Annette—Miss Remens, Peggy—Miss Rudelhoff (from the Theatre Royal English Opera House [London], being their first appearance on this stage)." They made their debut at the Argyle Rooms on Saturday 23 August 1834, where she played Peggy and Clarke Annette in John Burgoyne's opera The Lord of the Manor. She married James Murray in 1836, but he did not support her profession.

Dinah Rudelhoff became the director manager of the Geelong Theatre in Victoria in 1845, and reportedly performed her task with 'reasonable success'. This made her the second woman in Australia to have managed a theatre, making her a historical figure.
