= Howieson =

Howieson is a surname. Notable people with the surname include:

- Cameron Howieson (born 1994), New Zealand footballer
- Jack Howieson (born 1981), English rugby league footballer
- Jimmy Howieson (1900–1974), Scottish footballer

== See also ==
- Howison
