= Henry Aaron Stern =

Anglican missionary and captive in Abyssinia (1820–1885)

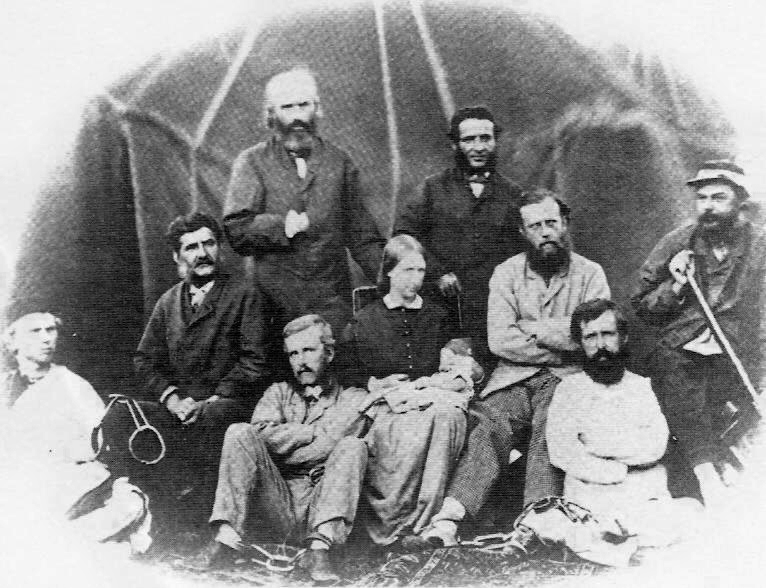
Henry A. Stern (third from the left, standing) and his fellow prisoners. The photo was taken immediately after the prisoners' liberation by the Napier Expedition in 1868.

Henry Aaron Stern (*11 April 1820, Unterreichenbach near Gelnhausen; † 13 May 1885, Hackney, London) was an Anglican missionary and priest of Jewish origin. After converting to Christianity in London in 1840 and studying with the London Society for Promoting Christianity Among the Jews, he dedicated himself to missionary work, especially among Jewish communities in the Middle East and the Beta Israel (Falashas) in Ethiopia.

Stern became especially known for his arrest and imprisonment by the Ethiopian Emperor Tewodros II in 1863, which stemmed from political tensions between Great Britain and Abyssinia. During his multi-year captivity, he endured severe torture. He and his fellow captives were eventually freed in 1868 by a British expeditionary corps. After his return to England, he worked as a leading missionary for his society until his death. His work Wanderings Among the Falashas in Abyssinia (1862) is considered one of the key sources on the life of the Falashas before their conversion to normative Judaism.

== Biography ==
=== Early life ===
Henry Aaron Stern was born as Heinrich Aaron Stern on 11 April 1820, in the village of Unterreichenbach, near Gelnhausen in the Grand Duchy of Hesse, as the youngest son of Jewish parents, Aaron and Hanna Stern, and grew up in humble circumstances. At age twelve, his family moved to the Jewish quarter of Frankfurt am Main. Stern’s father hoped he would become a doctor, but Heinrich was inclined to pursue a trade career. At seventeen, he was sent to Hamburg for commercial training and there encountered a Jewish missionary.

In 1839, Stern received an offer for a commercial position in London. However, upon arrival, he found the company bankrupt. During his stay in London, Stern converted to Christianity under the influence of Alexander McCaul and was baptized on 15 March 1840, at the Palestine Place Chapel. He then trained as a printer at the Operative Jewish Converts’ Institution and began his theological studies at the Hebrew College of the London Jews’ Society in 1842, intending to become a missionary to the Jews.

=== Early Missionary Work ===
Stern was appointed missionary to the Jews of Asia Minor in 1844 and then sailed to Palestine. Shortly after his arrival, he was ordained as a deacon on 11 July 1844, by Michael Alexander, the Anglican bishop of Jerusalem and a converted Jew. He subsequently traveled to Baghdad, visiting the cities of Babylon and Basra. In 1847, he embarked on a mission through Persia, where he preached not only to Jewish but also to Muslim audiences. After returning to England, he was ordained as a priest on 23 December 1849, at the Chapel Royal in Whitehall.

In 1850, Stern returned to Baghdad and remained there until 1853. During this time, he wrote Dawnings of Light in the East, which compiled biblical, historical, and statistical information on his travels in Persia, Kurdistan, and Mesopotamia. In 1853, he was appointed head of his society’s branch in Constantinople, where he served for three years. After the Crimean War, he undertook a mission to the Karaite Jews in Crimea and later traveled to Sanaa and other locations in Arabia. He was accompanied on these travels by his wife, Charlotte Elizabeth, the second daughter of Charles Henry Purday, whom he had married on 2 April 1850.

=== Missionary Work in Ethiopia and Imprisonment ===
In 1859, Stern turned his mission to the Beta Israel, known as the Ethiopian Jews. These were not actual Jews, but dissidents who had broken away from Orthodox Christianity due to political upheavals. They had no connection to Judaism but were mistakenly identified as Jews by European travelers due to their rejection of the New Testament and their Old Testament customs, despite not seeing themselves as Jews, nor were they regarded as Jews by Ethiopian Christians.

The emperor allowed Stern to preach among the Beta Israel, under the condition that the Ethiopian Patriarch Abba Salama gave his approval. The patriarch agreed but demanded that converted Beta Israel members join the Ethiopian church, a notion Stern internally rejected as he held a strong disdain for the Ethiopian church. This disdain was evident in his work Wanderings Among the Falashas in Abyssinia (1862), in which he referred to Emperor Tewodros as "his black majesty."

Stern established his headquarters in Janda and preached in various Beta Israel settlements in northwestern Ethiopia. He returned to Britain later that year, where he completed his already-begun work on Ethiopia. In late 1861, Stern returned to Ethiopia, continuing his mission work and appointing four Ethiopians as his subordinates. Although the number of converts remained small, his work deeply impacted the social fabric of the community by distributing Bible translations in the local language and disrupting existing divisions within the Beta Israel.

Stern’s mission activities took place during a time of escalating tensions between Abyssinia and Britain, which led to his capture by Emperor Tewodros II in 1863. In October, Stern was summoned to Gondar, where he and his missionary assistant, H. Rosenthal, were captured, flogged, and shackled. They were initially imprisoned in Gondar, then moved to Assasso, and finally to the mountain fortress at Amba Magdala in November 1864. By this time, Emperor Tewodros had gathered all Europeans he could detain, including British Consul Charles Duncan Cameron. During his imprisonment, Stern endured particularly brutal torture and humiliation from the emperor’s guards in response to derogatory remarks Stern made in his recently published book, which questioned the emperor’s noble lineage and claimed his mother had sold Kosso, a traditional Ethiopian remedy for tapeworms, causing the emperor extreme anger. Thanks to his wife’s efforts in England – with whom Stern maintained correspondence – Stern’s imprisonment and torture became widely known to the British public.

In early 1866, British-Abyssinian relations seemed to ease, and the prisoners were released from their shackles in February, with the promise of release. However, Emperor Tewodros changed his mind just before the transfer to British envoy Hormuzd Rassam, detained the envoy, put the Europeans on trial, and returned the larger group to Amba Magdala, where they arrived on 12 July. Four days later, the prisoners were once again shackled.

The emperor’s capture of Europeans to use as leverage against the United Kingdom ultimately triggered a British intervention, which would lead to his downfall. In 1867, a British expedition under Sir Robert Cornelis Napier was dispatched with the explicit goal of freeing the captives. On 10 April 1868, the Ethiopian army suffered a crushing defeat; three days later, Napier’s forces took Magdala, freeing Stern and the other captives. Emperor Tewodros took his own life to avoid capture. On 17 April, Magdala was burned to the ground, much to Stern’s satisfaction. Stern then promptly returned to England.

=== Later Years and Death ===
After his return to Britain in 1868, Stern published an account of his experiences in Ethiopia titled The Captive Missionary. In the following years, he increasingly focused on missionary work among Jews in Britain. In January 1871, he was appointed the chief missionary in London by his society. He settled in Palestine Place, where he oversaw the Wanderers’ Home and regularly preached to Jewish audiences, aiming to convert them to Christianity. In 1881, he was awarded an honorary doctorate in theology by the Archbishop of Canterbury, and in 1884, he was appointed to his society’s council.

After the death of his first wife Charlotte on 1 January 1874, Stern remarried Rebecca Davis, daughter of Strangman Davis-Goff and Susan Maxwell Ussher, on 3 March 1883. Heinrich Aaron Stern died on 13 May 1885, in his home in Hackney, London, and was buried on 18 May at the City of London Cemetery in Ilford, Essex.

== Publications ==
Stern left behind significant works documenting his missionary journeys and experiences, including Dawnings of Light in the East: with Biblical, Historical, and Statistical Notices of Persons and Places in Persia, Kurdistan, and Mesopotamia (1854), Journal of a Missionary Journey into Arabia Felix (1858), Wanderings among the Falashas in Abyssinia: together with a Description of the Country and its various Inhabitants (1862) – a key source on the life of the Falashas before their conversion to normative Judaism – and The Captive Missionary: being an Account of the Country and People of Abyssinia – Embracing a Narrative of King Theodore’s life, and his Treatment of Political and Religious Missions (1868). Several of Stern’s letters were published in Letters from the Captive Missionaries in Abyssinia (1866).
