= Matinee Ladies =

1927 film by Byron Haskin

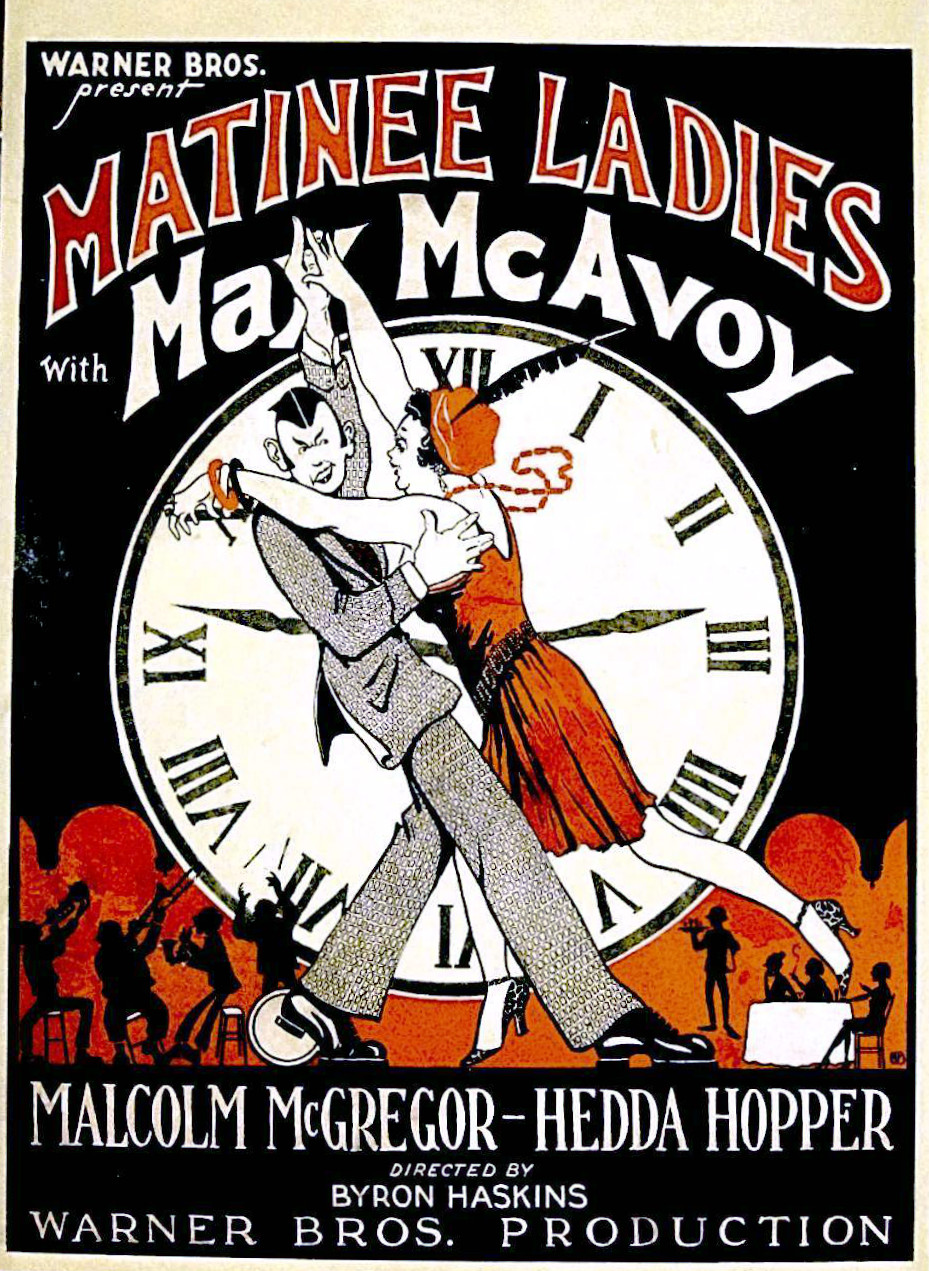
- Film poster
- Directed by: Byron Haskin
- Written by: C. Graham Baker
- Story by: Sidney Buchman; Albert S. Howson
- Starring: May McAvoy
- Cinematography: Frank Kesson
- Production company: Warner Bros.
- Distributed by: Warner Bros.
- Release date: April 9, 1927
- Running time: 70 minutes
- Country: United States
- Language: Silent (English intertitles)

Matinee Ladies was a 1927 American silent comedy film produced and distributed by Warner Bros. Directed by Byron Haskin, the film starred May McAvoy and was Haskin's first directorial effort after having been a cinematographer. Matinee Ladies is now considered lost.

== Cast ==
- May McAvoy as Sallie Smith
- Malcolm McGregor as Bob Ward
- Hedda Hopper as Mrs. Aldrich
- Margaret Seddon as Mrs. Smith
- Richard Tucker as Tom Mannion
- Jean Lefferty as Maizie Blossom
- Cissy Fitzgerald as Madame Leonine
- William Demarest as Man About Town
