= Mrs W. H. Foley =

British actress, singer and director

- Born: Catherine Huggins; 2 January 1821; Louth, Lincolnshire, England
- Died: 4 March 1887 (aged 66); Napier, New Zealand
- Other names: Catherine Huggins; L. K. Foley; Lucy Kate Lowten
- Occupations: Actor; Singer; Entertainer; Director; Manager
- Spouses: Daniel Caparn (m. 1845; sep. 1849) William Henry Foley (m. 1851; sep. 1857) Lowten Lowten (m. 1882)
- Children: Charles Pierce Huggins (b. 1843); Wilhelmina Foley (b. 1850s)

Catherine Huggins, known in history as Mrs W. H. Foley (2 January 1821 – 4 March 1887) was a British actress, singer, director and manager. Mrs W. H. Foley is best known for her major contribution to early theatrical entertainment in New Zealand between 1855 and 1867.

== Life ==
=== Early life ===
Foley was born into a theatrical family in England in 1821 as the second of ten children to mother, Frances Pierce and father, Benjamin Edwin Huggins. She was baptised Catherine Huggins in Louth, Lincolnshire, England, in early 1821. Her parents and both sets of grandparents were actors, and this theatrical heritage asserted itself in Catherine's adult life.

Unmarried, Foley gave birth to her first child, a boy named Charles Pierce Huggins, in March 1843. Shortly afterwards, on 17 September 1845 at St Pancras Church, London, she married her son's father, Daniel Caparn, a chemist and druggist. A couple years later in 1847 the family emigrated to Tasmania where Foley became a dressmaker and milliner in Hobart. Separating from her husband, Foley traveled alone to San Francisco in June 1849, among the throngs attracted by the California Gold Rush.

=== Early career ===
In San Francisco Foley met William Henry Foley, a charismatic clown, circus proprietor and theatrical entrepreneur, whom she married in June 1851, becoming Mrs W. H. Foley. Her first reported stage appearance took place in Sacramento on 23 June 1851, as Mrs W. H. Foley; she performed in a song-and-dance troupe sharing the bill with one of her husband's more elaborate imported showpieces, A Great American Panorama of New York City.

=== New Zealand ===
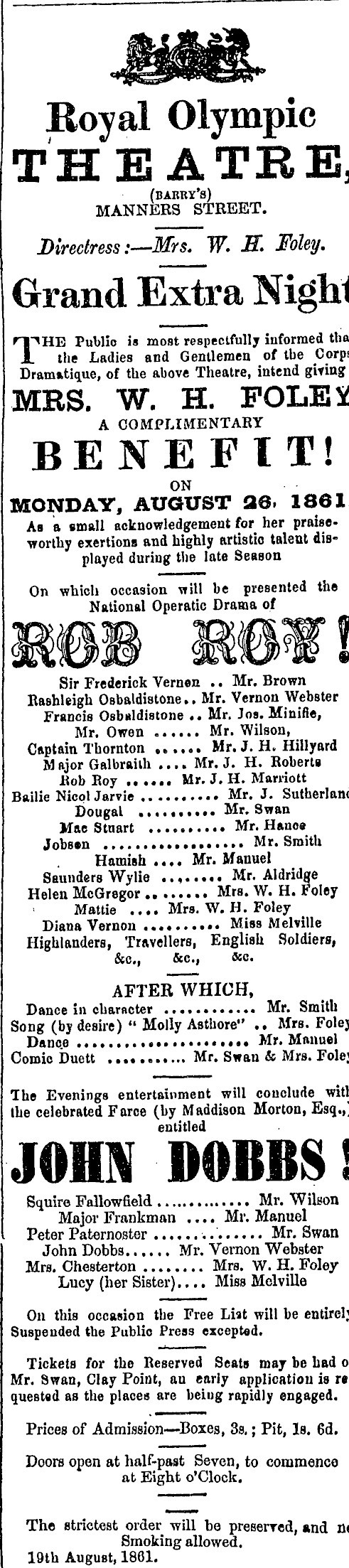
Advertisement for a production by Mrs J H Foley for a performance in Wellington in 1861

The Foleys presented plays and other entertainments to enthusiastic audiences in Hawaii in late 1851 and 1852, and in December 1852 sailed from Honolulu to Australia. After stage and circus shows in Sydney and Melbourne they ventured to New Zealand with their Victoria Circus, landing in Nelson on 13 September 1855. Between 1855 and 1867, Mrs W. H. Foley toured in New Zealand as its leading actress. Along with her spouse, William Foley, Mrs Foley is considered to have had a significant impact on the theater life on New Zealand as one of its very first pioneering theatrical professionals, introducing theater to many of the settlers there for the first time.

Mrs W. H. Foley originally appeared in the circus in 'comic duets in character' with her spouse. Very soon after, however, she debuted as an actor in the Military Theatre in Auckland. She performed a large repertoire of comedies, farces, historical plays and melodramas. First supported by amateurs led by the theater pioneer George Buckingham, she was joined by professional actors which her spouse had imported from Sydney in Australia to staff the Theatre Royal, which he had opened on 3 March 1856. In the end of 1856, the theater company toured to Wellington, and the following ten years, it performed successful tours around New Zealand to Lyttelton, Christchurch, Wanganui, Dunedin and Napier. Mrs. Foley separated from her spouse in 1857, and in 1860 appointed Vernon Webster as her new colleague and leading man. Vernon Webster was a stage name adopted in New Zealand by 28-year-old Lowten Lowten, an experienced amateur actor originally from Liverpool.

Mrs W. H. Foley was the manager of her touring theater company and also its leading star as the acknowledged favorite of New Zealand theater. Normally, they performed popular plays and revues, but on occasion also substantial work, such as Shakespeare. Her personal repertoire was reportedly very large, and she was widely popular, presenting dramatic performances to many of the settlers for the first time in New Zealand. She appeared both as an actor as well as a singer. During the 1860s, her company encountered competition from other touring theaters, and her popularity declined. Foley gave the last of three farewell performances in Wellington on 10 December 1866. Six months later on 3 July 1867 Foley, along with her companion Vernon Webster, left New Zealand on the Lieutenant, bound for Guam and Valparaiso, Chile.

A play called Vagabonds was written by Lorrae Parry in 2003 about the imagined adventures in New Zealand of Mrs Foley, Charlotte Badger and Mrs Swan a suffragette.

=== Later career ===
In late 1868 there is a record of Mrs W. H. Foley (now going by 'L. K. Foley' or 'Lucy') and Vernon Webster (now Lowten Lowten) advertising a benefit performance in Peru to enable them to return to their ‘own country’. It seems they were in financial strife following the deaths of several members of their company. In June 1873, the couple resurfaced in Liverpool where they were married on 11 May 1882 as Mr & Mrs Lowten Lowten.

In late December 1883, the couple returned to New Zealand. From 29 February ‘Mr and Mrs Lowten Lowten’ began staging some ‘drawing room entertainments’ at the Napier Theatre Royal and in nearby towns. On 21 April 1884 a nearly identical programme was given in Wanganui, billed as by ‘Mrs W. H. Foley and Vernon Webster’. The performance in Wanganui was the last given by the couple, and the names of Mrs W. H. Foley and Vernon Webster disappeared from public view.

Lucy Kate Lowten (AKA: Catherine Huggins and Mrs W. H. Foley) died at Napier, New Zealand on 4 March 1887 and was buried in the Napier cemetery. Her death certificate noted that she had no surviving children but this may not be correct. Her son Charles Caparn and a daughter, Wilhelmina Foley (who was born in the 1850s), could still have been alive.

== See also ==
- Anne Clarke
