= William Howson =

William Howson may refer to:

- William R. Howson (1883–1952), Canadian politician and judge
- William Howson (footballer) (born 1892), English professional footballer
