= Singing class movement =

The Singing Class movement was a mid-19th century social phenomenon in the United Kingdom which sought to teach sight-singing to children at primary school age, and which ultimately resulted in the formation of a large number of church choirs and choral societies.

== History ==
From the mid-19th century onwards, the Singing-class movement spread around the UK, and its influence was observed to have been felt particularly by the latter half of the 19th century, having instilled "a great enthusiasm for singing among the lower and middle classes", educationalists and reformers having created what was described as a "mania for choral sight singing". It was allied to a widening of access to printed music, which was particularly championed by Joseph Mainzer and John Pyke Hullah.
