= Charles Duncan Cameron =

British soldier (1825–1870)

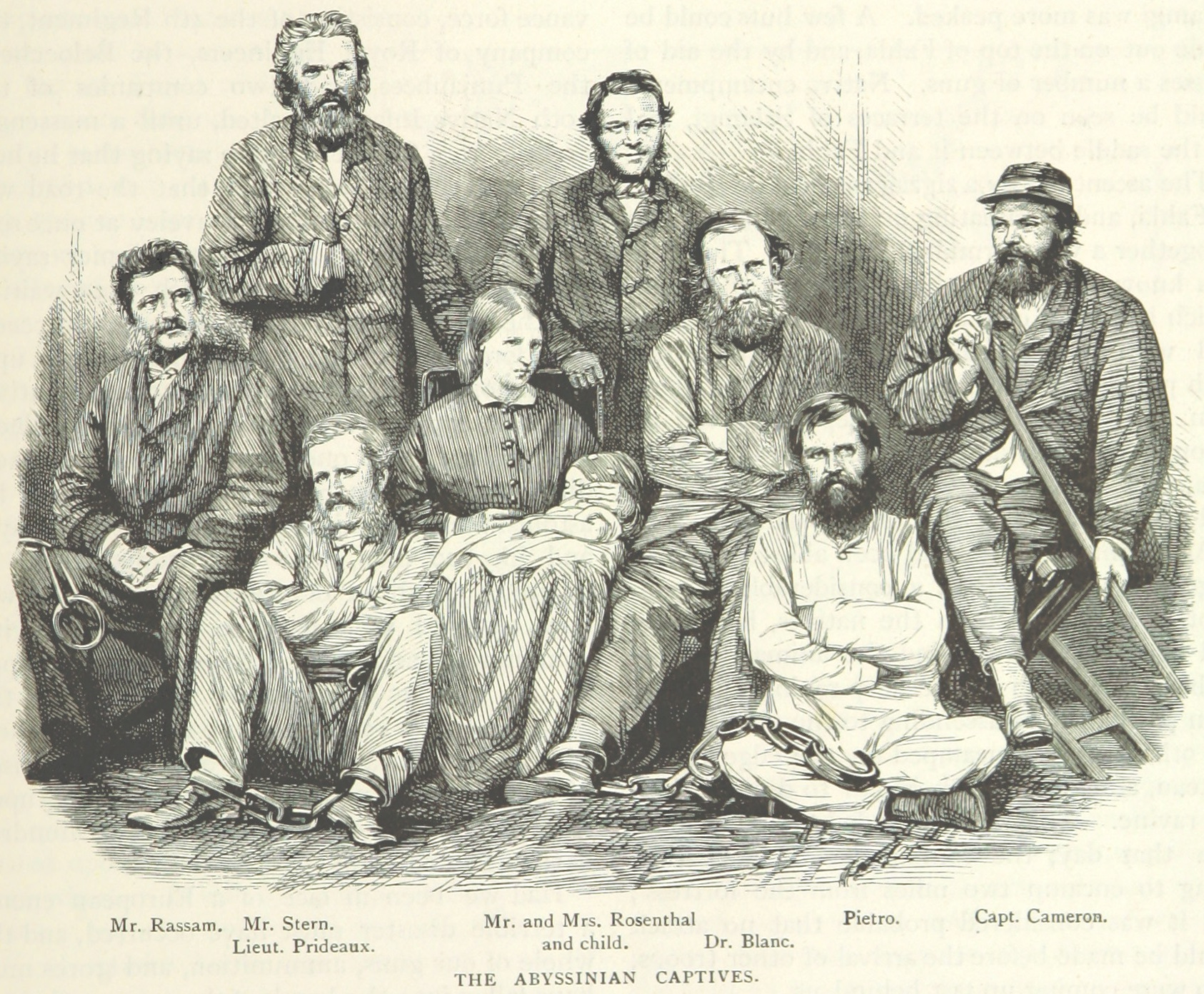
Cameron (far right) with the other captives of Tewodros II

Charles Duncan Cameron (1825–1870) was a British soldier who was serving as British consul in Ethiopia when he was imprisoned by Emperor Tewodros II as one of the acts which led to the 1868 Expedition to Abyssinia.

== Life ==
Cameron was the son of Colonel Allan Cameron, 3rd Buffs, and was born in the Isle of Man in 1825. He entered the army 19 May 1846, by purchasing the commission of an ensign in the 45th Foot, and served with that unit until July 1851. During this time he was attached to the native levies during the Kaffir war of 1846–47. Having settled in Natal on his retirement from the 45th, he was employed by (afterwards Sir) B.C. Pine, then lieutenant-governor of that colony, on diplomatic service in the Zulu country, and acted as Kaffir magistrate in the Klip river district of Natal. He commanded the Kaffir irregulars sent from Natal to the Cape Colony overland during the war of 1851–52. At the outbreak of the Crimean War he was appointed to the staff of Sir Fenwick Williams, her majesty's commissioner with the Turkish army, receiving the local rank of captain. He was placed in command of the fortifications under construction at Erzeroum, and after the fall of Kars was detached on special service to Trebizond until September 1856. For his military services he received the Kaffir and Turkish war medals, and the Turkish medal for his service at Kars.

Cameron entered the civil service, and was appointed vice-consul at Redout Kale in April 1858, and was removed to Poti in 1859. He was appointed British consul in Abyssinia to reside at Massawa in 1860, and left for his new posting in November 1861, arriving there 9 January 1862. He accompanied the Grand Duke of Saxe-Cobourg during a visit to the interior in that year. Cameron afterwards left Massawa to deliver to Emperor Tewodros a royal letter and presents from Queen Victoria, arriving at Gondar 23 June 1862, and reaching the Emperor's camp that October. In his report back to the British Foreign Office, Cameron included a letter from the Ethiopian Emperor, which went unread.

Meanwhile, Consul Cameron went on a visit to the Bogos, where he worked to re-establish British influence, as well as the towns of Kassala and Metemma, returning to Ethiopia in June 1863. Once there, he stayed with the missionaries at Jenda in Dembiya. His visit to the Sudan raised Emperor Tewodros' suspicions, but more important to the Emperor was the lack of a reply to his own letter to Queen Victoria. In response to the Emperor's concern, Cameron reportedly offered his own head if a response did not come within two months. The Emperor took his frustration out on one of the missionaries, Henry Aaron Stern, who had mentioned the Emperor's humble beginnings in his book. Stern watched his servants beaten to death, then he with his associate Rosenthal, were "chained, severely treated, and the latter thrashed on several occasions." Consul Cameron spent the following months unsuccessfully working to secure Stern's release. When the long-awaited response to his report finally arrived 22 November 1863, it contained a reprimand to Cameron for his travels beyond Massawa and an order to return to that port; there was not even a mention of the Emperor's letter. Cameron still pleaded with Tewodros for patience, and permission to obey his superiors' commands and return to Massawa; the Emperor, who had become deeply suspicious, on 3 January 1864 ordered the British Consul, his European staff, and the four missionaries at Jenda put into chains. Cameron was forced to then write to London a succinct message: "No release until civil answer to King's letter arrives."

Cameron remained Tewodros's prisoner until after the arrival of Hormuzd Rassam at the Emperor's camp in January 1865. Rassam had been sent with a copy of the belated reply to the Emperor's letter to obtain the release of all of Tewodros' European captives, and had spent the better part of a year forced to wait in Massawa before he could travel inland. Although released after a show trial, Cameron, the missionaries, and even their rescuer Rassam were arrested once more, and confined to Maqdala from 12 July 1866, until released, with the other prisoners, on the appearance of the British army before Maqdala, 11 April 1868. Cameron returned to England in July 1868, and retired on a pension in December of the same year. He died at Geneva on 30 May 1870.

Cameron was elected fellow of the Royal Geographical Society in 1858.
