= The Vampire (1915 film) =

1915 film by Alice Guy-Blaché

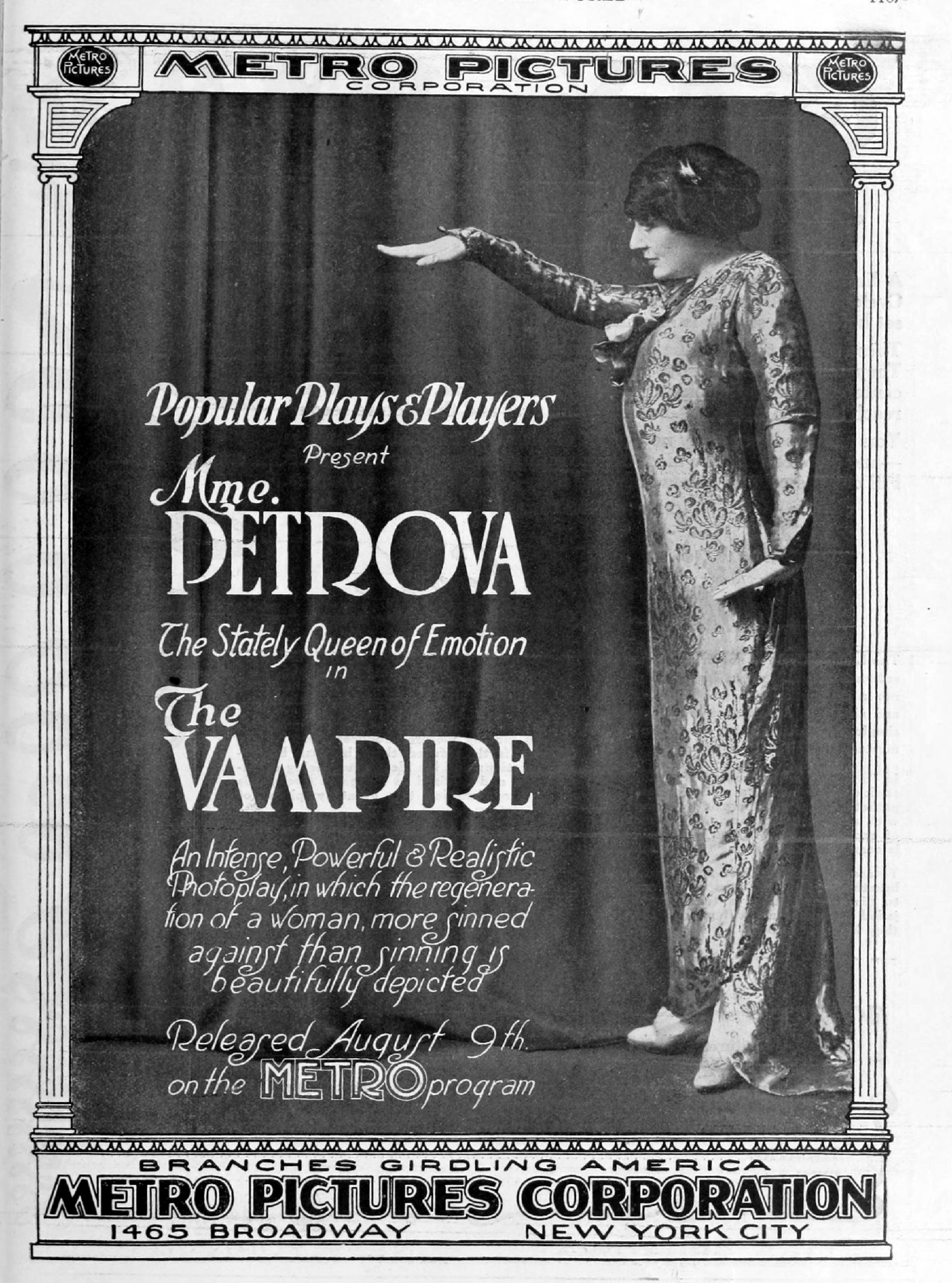
- Advertisement for film
- Directed by: Alice Guy
- Written by: Olga Petrova
- Story by: Lee Morrison
- Produced by: Herbert Blaché; Alice Guy
- Starring: Olga Petrova; Vernon Steele
- Production companies: Popular Plays and Players Inc.
- Distributed by: Metro Pictures
- Release date: August 9, 1915
- Running time: 5 reels
- Country: United States
- Language: Silent (English intertitles)

The Vampire is a surviving 1915 American silent drama film directed by Alice Guy and starring Olga Petrova. It was distributed through Metro Pictures. This is one of Petrova and Guy's few surviving silent films.

== Cast ==
- Olga Petrova as Jeanne Lefarge
- Vernon Steele as Robert Sterling
- William A. Morse as John Glenning
- Wallace Scott as Louis Katz
- Lawrence Grattan as Richard Sterling
- Albert Howson as Francis Murray
- Mary G. Martin

== Preservation status ==
The film is preserved in the collection of the Library of Congress.
