= Albertazzi =

Albertazzi is an Italian surname. Notable people with the surname include:

- Emma Albertazzi (1814–1847), English opera singer
- Giorgio Albertazzi (1923–2016), Italian actor and film director
- Michelangelo Albertazzi (born 1991), Italian footballer
