= Music Publishers Association (UK) =

- Industry: Music
- Founded: 1881
- Headquarters: London, United Kingdom
- Website: www.mpaonline.org.uk

The Music Publishers Association (MPA) is a non-profit organisation representing music publishers in the United Kingdom since 1881. It "exists to safeguard and promote the interests of music publishers and the writers signed to them; represent these interests to government, the music industry, the media and the public, provide publishers with a forum, a collective voice and a wide range of benefits, services and training courses; promote an understanding of the value of music and the importance of copyright; and provide information and guidance to members of the public". The MPA is a member of the music industry umbrella organisation UK Music.

== History ==
The MPA was founded in 1881 as a way to protect and safeguard the interests of sheet music publishers. The founding members were:

- Thomas Patey Chappell & Frank Chappell (Chappell & Co)
- Emile Enoch (Enoch & Sons)
- George Jeffreys (G F Jeffreys)
- Henry Littleton
- W Morley Jr
- C H Purday (J B Cramer & Co)
- Stroud L Cocks (R. Cocks & Co.)
- Barnard Lucas

They were soon joined by Charles Boosey, Edwin Ashdown and George Patey.

By 1887 the MPA had its own offices in Air Street, London. Over the years the offices have been situated in several London locations, most recently moving to British Music House in December 2005.

By 1905 the MPA had grown to 19 members and would continue to expand its membership to the present total of over 270 publishers handling over three thousand subsidiary companies, dealing in most musical genres.

In the fifties the MPA became involved in the introduction of the Ivor Novello Awards in 1956. A few years earlier in 1951 the MPA became a founder member of the British Joint Copyright Council (which would later become the British Copyright Council in 1965).

In 1976 the association acquired ownership of the Mechanical-Copyright Protection Society (MCPS).

The MPA was a founder member of British Music Rights (formed in 1996) together with the British Academy of Composers, Songwriters and Authors (BASCA), the Mechanical-Copyright Protection Society and the Performing Right Society. In 2008 British Music Rights grew into an expanded body called UK Music.

In October 2015 Jane Dyball was named CEO of MPA Group of Companies bringing together the MPA, Mechanical-Copyright Protection Society (MCPS), Independent Music Publishers e-Licensing (IMPEL) and Printed Music Licensing Limited (PMLL) under one umbrella.

In 2018 IMPEL became a standalone entity to focus on its independent members' interests.

Paul Clements (formally Executive Director of Membership, International & Licensing at PRS for Music) succeeded Jane Dyball as CEO on 1 February 2019.

== MPA Group ==
The MPA currently owns and operates two commercial businesses:

- Mechanical-Copyright Protection Society – MCPS is the UK collection society that licenses mechanical (or reproduction) copyrights on behalf of over 26,000 music publisher and composer members.
- Printed Music Licensing Ltd – PMLL represents music publishers to allow UK schools to make copies of printed music.

== Conduct ==
=== International Music Score Library Project ===
In April 2011, the MPA issued a DMCA takedown notice against the International Music Score Library Project (IMSLP), a publisher of public domain sheet music. Go Daddy, the domain name registrar for the IMSLP, removed the domain name "imslp.org", leaving it inaccessible. The MPA's argument was similar to that made in 2007 by Universal Edition. In particular, the MPA claimed that Rachmaninoff's 1913 choral symphony The Bells violated US and EU copyright. According to IMSLP, the action is without any merit. Almost 24 hours later, the MPA announced on Twitter that they had asked Go Daddy to reinstate the domain name.

=== Hargreaves Review ===
The Hargreaves Review has made recommendations that include exemptions of copyright such as 'format shifting', where music users would be allowed to copy music from one format to another legally; for example, copying from CD to MP3 – an act that is technically illegal under UK law. The MPA has taken a firm stance against these recommendations. The MPA claims that this could cost publishers up to £40 million a year. An explanation of why the customers of their members should pay an extra £40 million has not been given.

The Hargreaves Review also proposes an exemption for parodied works. This has also been fiercely opposed by the MPA.

=== Operation Creative ===
In August 2016 the MPA joined the Police Intellectual Property Crime Unit's Operation Creative initiative in the fight against online music piracy.

== Tony Pool Award ==
Created in 2018, The Tony Pool Award Award recognises and celebrates the achievements of those who have shown an outstanding contribution to the administrative areas of the music publishing industry.

The Tony Pool Award was created to recognise and applaud all those individuals that work in the "back office" areas of royalties, copyright, business affairs, finance, HR and IT for music publishers. While not in the spotlight, music publishing depends on this backbone to deliver its £505 million contribution to the UK economy.

The award is in memory of the late Tony Pool who died in 2016. Tony spent most of his working life with Boosey & Hawkes, eventually becoming Head of Business Affairs. He was a firm advocate of copyright reform and made a significant contribution to political discussions in the UK and in Europe. He also paved the way for the creation of British Music Rights.

== MPA Richard Toeman Scholarship ==
Founded in 2006, the MPA Richard Toeman Scholarship is designed to:

- Support the progress of outstanding individuals working within the music publishing industry.
- Encourage potential or new recruits to the industry to develop their skills via work placement or study.
- Offer tailored support to recipients towards a successful career in the music publishing industry.

The scholarship is in memory of the late Richard Toeman who died suddenly in March 2005 following a 40-year career at Josef Weinberger Ltd. Throughout his career, Richard gave his time and expertise to the MPA and to the music publishing business. He was admired and respected by colleagues working across all sectors of the industry. The MPA is proud to pay tribute to his contribution to our work via the Richard Toeman Scholarship.

== Events ==
The MPA hosts a varied range of events for its members and the wider industry.
