= Hormuzd Rassam =

Assyrian archaeologist (1826–1910)

Hormuzd Rassam ܗܪܡܙܕ ܪܣܐܡ
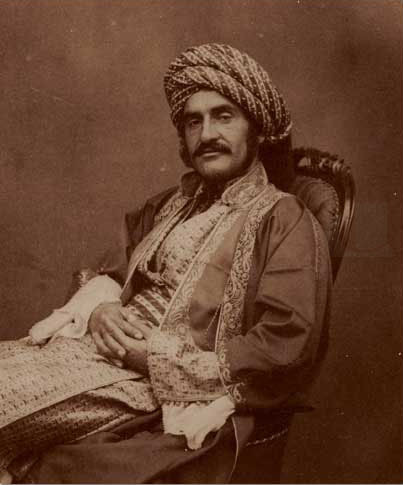
- Hormuzd Rassam in Mosul
- Born: October 3, 1826; Mosul, Mosul vilayet, Ottoman Empire (now Nineveh Governorate, Iraq)
- Died: September 16, 1910 (aged 83); Hove, England, United Kingdom
- Occupations: archaeologist, Assyriologist, activist, author

Hormuzd Rassam (Syriac: ܗܪܡܙܕ ܪܣܐܡ; Arabic: هرمز رسام; 1826 – 16 September 1910) was an Assyriologist and author. He is known for making a number of important archaeological discoveries from 1877 to 1882, including the Cyrus Cylinder and the clay tablets that contained the Epic of Gilgamesh, the world's oldest notable literature. He is widely believed to be the first-known Middle Eastern and Assyrian archaeologist from the Ottoman Empire. He emigrated to the United Kingdom, where he was naturalized as a British citizen, settling in Brighton. He represented the government as a diplomat, helping to free British diplomats from captivity in Ethiopia.

== Biography ==
=== Early life ===
Hormuzd Rassam was an ethnic Assyrian, born in Mosul in Upper Mesopotamia (now modern northern Iraq), then part of the Ottoman Empire. His father was a member of the Chaldean Catholic Church where his grandfather, Anton Rassam, from Mosul, was the church's archdeacon. His mother Theresa was a daughter of Isaak Halabee of Aleppo, also then within the Ottoman Empire. Hormuzd's brother was British Vice-Consul in Mosul, which was how he obtained his start with Layard.

=== Early archaeological career ===
At the age of 20 in 1846, Rassam was hired by British archaeologist Austen Henry Layard as his personal assistant at Nimrud, a nearby ancient Assyrian excavation site. Layard, who was in Mosul on his first expedition (1845–47), was impressed by the hardworking Rassam and took him under his wing; they would remain friends for life. Layard provided an opportunity for Rassam to travel to England and study at Magdalen College, Oxford. He studied there for 18 months before accompanying Layard on his second expedition to Iraq (1849–51).

Layard left archeology to begin a political career. Rassam continued field work (1852–54) at Nimrud and Nineveh, where he made a number of important and independent discoveries. These included the clay tablets that would later be deciphered by George Smith as the Epic of Gilgamesh, the world's oldest written narrative poem.

=== Diplomatic career ===
Rassam returned to England. With the help of Layard, he began a new career in government with a posting to the British Consulate in Aden, quickly rising to the post of First Political Resident and facilitating a number of agreements between the British and formerly hostile local community leaders. In 1866, an international crisis arose in Ethiopia when British missionaries were taken hostage by Emperor Tewodros II. England decided to send Rassam as an ambassador with a message from Queen Victoria in the aspiration of resolving the situation peacefully. After being delayed for about a year in Massawa, Rassam at last received permission from the Emperor to enter his realm. Due to rebellions in Tigray Province, Rassam was forced to follow a circuitous route taking him to Kassala, then to Metemma along the western shore of Lake Tana before finally meeting with Emperor Tewodros in northern Gojjam. At first his effort seemed promising, as the Emperor established him at Qorata, a village on the south-eastern shores of Lake Tana, and sent him numerous gifts. The emperor sent the British consul Charles Duncan Cameron, the missionary Henry Aaron Stern, and the other hostages to his encampment.

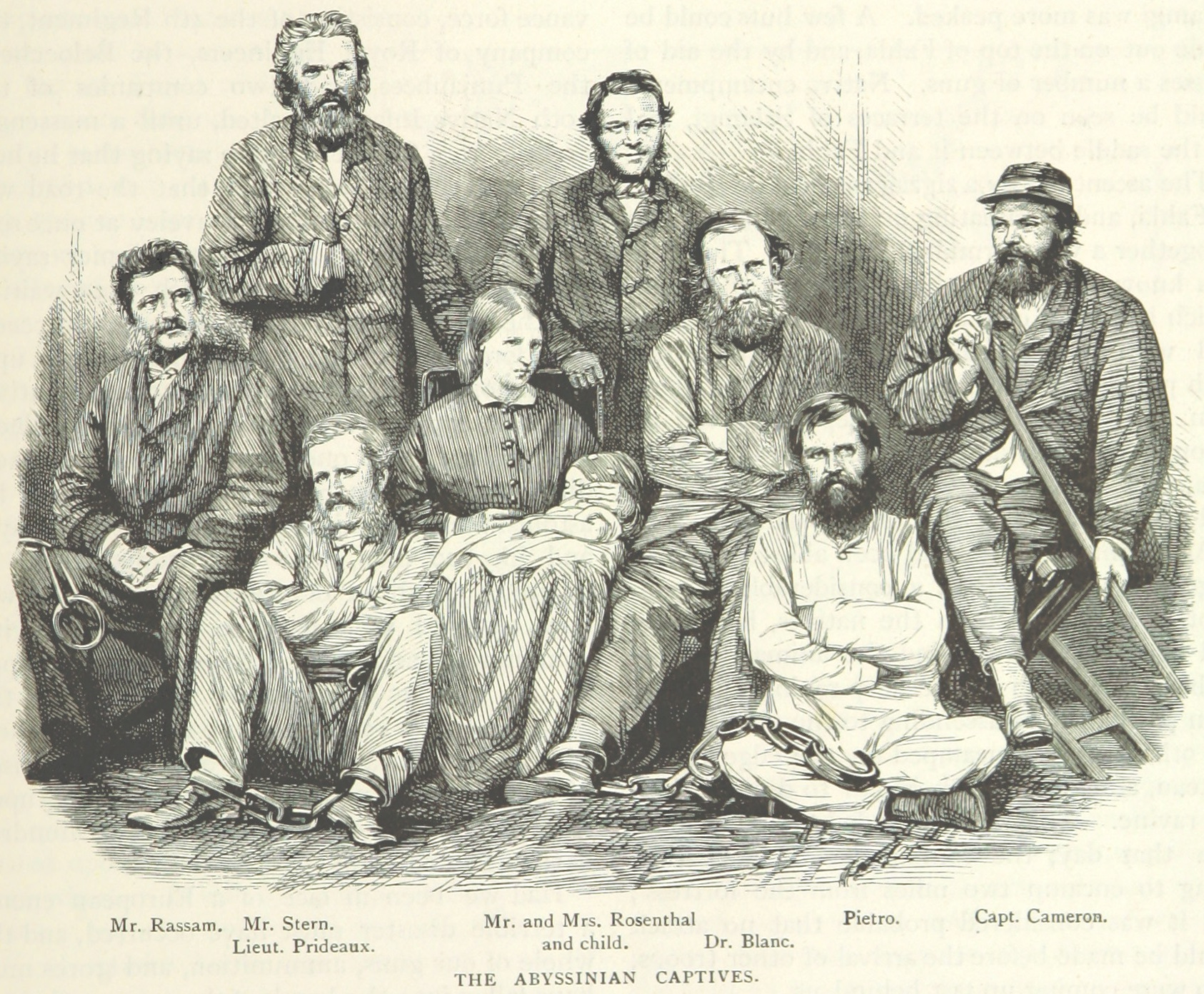
Rassam (far left) with the other captives of Tewodros II

However, about this time Charles Tilstone Beke arrived at Massawa and forwarded letters from the hostages' families to Tewodros asking for their release. At the least Beke's actions only made Tewodros suspicious. Rassam, writing in his memoirs of the incident, is more direct: "I date the change in the King's conduct towards me, and the misfortunes which eventually befell the members of the Mission and the old captives, from this day." The monarch suddenly changed his mind, and made Rassam a prisoner as well. The British hostages were held for two years until English and Indian troops under Robert Napier, 1st Baron Napier of Magdala in the 1868 British Expedition to Abyssinia resolved the standoff by defeating the warlord and his army. Rassam's reputation was damaged in newspaper accounts because he was unfairly portrayed as ineffectual in dealing with the emperor. This reflected Victorian prejudices of the time against "Orientals". However, Rassam did have supporters, both in the press and especially in government amongst both Liberal and Tory ministers. In 1869, the London Quarterly Review received Rassam's memoir of the Abyssinian crisis positively, acknowledged Rassam's qualifications for the mission and defended his actions under difficult circumstances:

[I]t will remove any doubts that may still exist as to the origin of his mission, the wisdom of the selection of its chief, and the manner in which a task of extraordinary difficulty, delicacy, and danger was performed...it [is] shown by Mr. Rassam that two successive Governments should have expressed their entire approval of his conduct Lord Stanley has done, that he is above party of a public officer who has been unjustly attacked and condemned; and in a letter to Mr. Rassam, laid before Parliament, he expressed the high sense entertained by Her Majesty's Government of his conduct during the difficult and arduous period of his employment under the Foreign Office, and declared that he had acted throughout for the best, and that his prudence, discretion, and good management seem to have tended greatly to preserve the peace. [and secured] prisoners in the most serious risk... This ample recognition of his services, coming from so high and impartial a quarter, ought to afford ample compensation to Ram for the injustice and cruelty - we might almost say malignity - of the attacks made upon his personal character and his public conduct, both in Parliament and the press, when he was in captivity and unable to reply or to defend himself.

Queen Victoria presented him with a purse of £5,000 for services rendered as her envoy in the crisis.

Rassam also stated in his account of the Ethiopian highlands that along with the Amhara ethnic identity, the word was used as a catch-all for Christians and that when people in the country discovered he was Christian they described him as Amhara "when they wished to distinguish us from the 'Turks.'" Rassam resumed his archaeological work, but did undertake other tasks for the British government in later years. During the Russo-Turkish War (1877–78), he undertook a mission of inquiry to report on the condition of the Christians, Armenian and Greek Christian communities of Anatolia and Armenia.

=== Later archaeological career ===
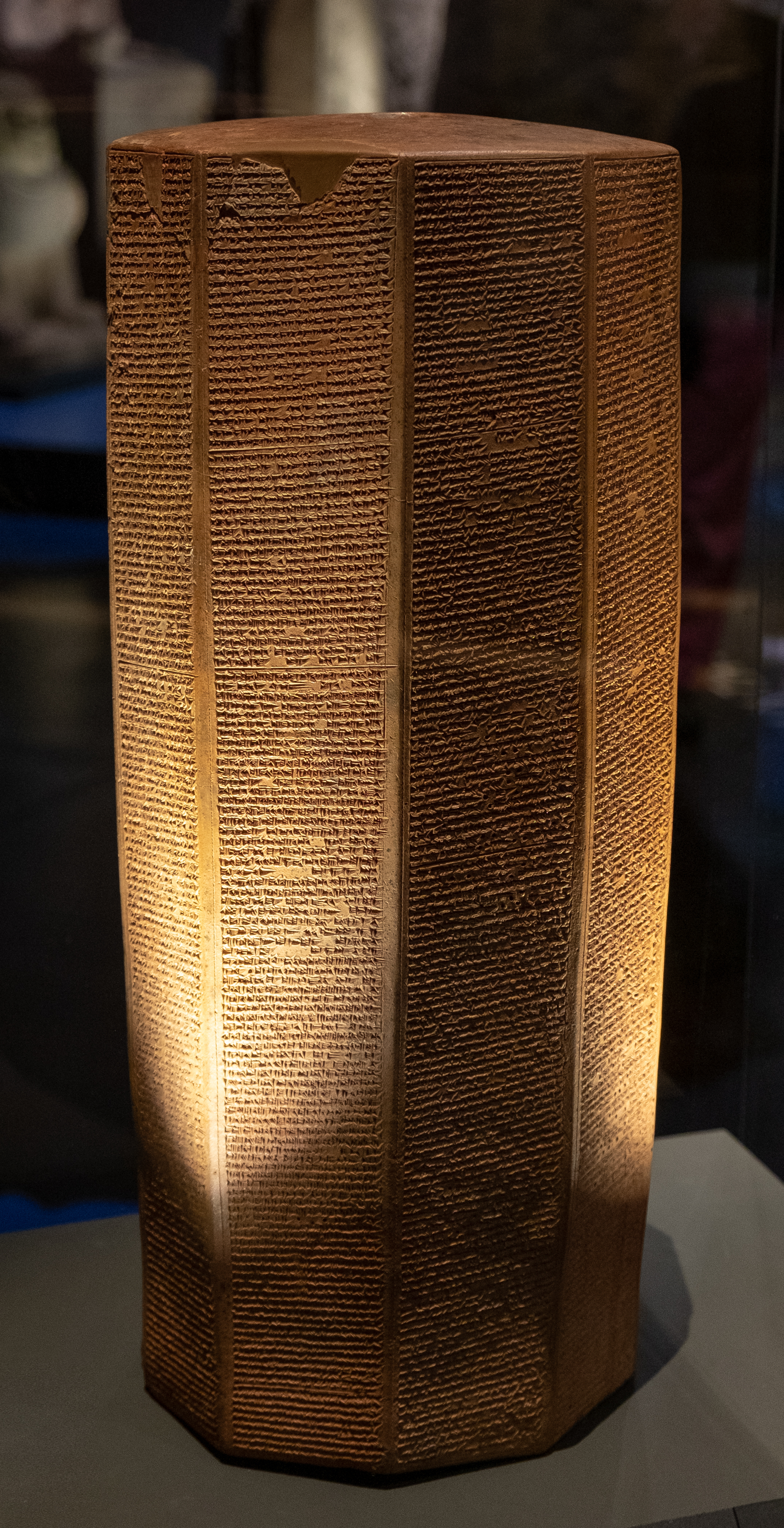
The Rassam cylinder of Ashurbanipal is named after its discoverer Hormuzd Rassam. It is a 10-sided prism and the most complete of the chronicles of Ashurbanipal, Nineveh, 643 BCE. British Museum.

From 1877 to 1882, while undertaking four expeditions on behalf of the British Museum, Rassam made some important discoveries. Numerous finds of significance were transported to the museum, thanks to an agreement made with the Ottoman Sultan by Rassam's old colleague Austen Henry Layard, now Ambassador at Constantinople, allowing Rassam to return and continue their earlier excavations and to "pack and dispatch to England any antiquities [he] found ... provided, however, there were no duplicates." A representative of the Sultan was instructed to be present at the dig to examine the objects as they were uncovered.

In Assyria his chief finds were the Ashurnasirpal temple in Nimrud (Calah), the cylinder of Ashurbanipal at Nineveh, and two of the unique and historically important bronze strips from the Balawat Gates. He identified the famous Hanging Gardens of Babylon with the mound known as Babil. He excavated a palace of Nebuchadnezzar II at Borsippa.

In March 1879 at the site of the Esagila in Babylon, Rassam found the Cyrus Cylinder, the famous declaration of Cyrus the Great that was issued in 539 BCE to commemorate the Achaemenid Empire's conquest of Babylonia.

At Abu Habba in 1881, Rassam discovered the temple of the sun at Sippar. There he found a Cylinder of Nabonidus and the stone tablet of Nabu-apla-iddina of Babylon with its ritual bas-relief and inscription. Besides these, he discovered some 50,000 clay tablets containing the temple accounts.

After 1882, Rassam lived mainly in Brighton, England. He wrote about Assyro-Babylonian exploration, the ancient Christian peoples of the Near East, and current religious controversies in England.

=== Archaeological reputation ===
Rassam's discoveries attracted worldwide attention. The Italian Royal Academy of Sciences at Turin awarded him the Brazza prize of 12,000 francs for the four years from 1879 to 1882. He was elected as a fellow of the Royal Geographical Society, the Society of Biblical Archaeology, and the Victoria Institute.

Sir Henry Rawlinson, the "Father of Assyriology", was a linguist who was a key figure in the deciphering of cuneiform, also one of the trustees of the British Museum at the time of Rassam's later excavations. He had been British Consul in Baghdad at the time of Rassam's original excavations at Nineveh, and had been placed in charge of the British excavations in 1853. Rawlinson alleged that he should receive the credit for the discovery of Ashurbanipal's palace himself. Rassam, he wrote, was just a "digger" who had overseen the work. In Rassam's defence, Layard wrote that he was, "one of the honestest and most straightforward fellows I ever knew, and one whose services have never been acknowledged".

Rassam believed that the credit for some of his other discoveries had been taken by senior British Museum staff. In 1893 Rassam had sued the British Museum keeper E. A. Wallis Budge in the British courts for both slander and libel. Budge had written that Rassam had used "his relatives" to smuggle antiquities out of Nineveh and had only sent "rubbish" to the British Museum. The elderly Rassam was upset by these accusations. When he challenged Budge in court, he received a partial apology that a later court considered "ungentlemanly". Rassam was fully supported by the courts. Later archaeological evidence found in relation to artefacts such as the Balawat Gates at Dur-Sharrukin support Rassam's account of the dispute. By the end of his life, Rassam's reputation and achievements were once again receiving greater recognition, at least amidst his professional colleagues; in their obituary for Rassam, the Royal Geographical Society wrote: "The death of Mr Hormuzd Rassam... deprives the Royal Geographical Society of one of its older and more distinguished Fellows..."

However, a 21st century account of the archaeology claims that Layard leaving Rassam in charge of his excavations when he left in 1851 was "not perhaps the wisest choice, since Rassam continued, even into the 1880s, an extensive and essentially unrecorded simultaneous looting of a large number of sites not only in Assyria but in Babylonia, at a times when other excavators were beginning to act more responsibly."

=== Published works ===
- The British Mission to Theodore, King of Abyssinia (1869), memoir
- Biblical Nationalities, Past and Present, article in Transactions of the Society of Biblical Archaeology, Vol.3, 8, pp. 358–385
- The Garden of Eden and Biblical Sages (1895)
- Asshur and the Land of Nimrod (1897).

== Personal life ==
Rassam married Anne Eliza Price, an Englishwoman. They had seven children together, five of whose names are known:

1. Theresa Rassam, born 1871. 2. Annie Ferida Rassam, born 1878. 3. Sarah Amina Rassam, born 1880. 4. Anthony Hormuzd Rassam, born 1883. 5. Mary Rassam.

His eldest daughter, Theresa Rassam, born in 1871, became a professional singer who performed with the D'Oyly Carte Opera Company.

His daughter, Annie Ferida Rassam, born in 1878, gave birth secretly at seven months of pregnancy, on September 10, 1914, to Jeanne Ferida Rassam at the Vercingétorix clinic, 219 rue Vercingétorix, in the 14th arrondissement at Paris. The baby girl's alleged father was Sir John Arnold Wallinger, delegate of the secret services. Jeanne was adopted by a French couple, Monsieur and Madame André Courthial. Annie Ferida Rassam returned to Brighton a few months later.

== Death ==
Rassam died on September 8, 1910, and was buried in Hove Cemetery. A number of personal effects relating to his career, including the chains he had worn in captivity in Ethiopia, were donated to Hove Museum, and were on display there until the 1950s, according to the recollections of his great-grandson, Cornelius Cavendish. Other items in the museum's possession relating to Rassam were at that time requested for the collections of the British Museum.

Hormuzd Rassam's great-grandson Cornelius Cavendish is currently writing his biography.

== See also ==
- List of Assyriologists
- Chaldean Catholics
- Cyrus Cylinder
- Epic of Gilgamesh
- Chaldean Catholic Church
