= Emma Howson =

Opera singer and actress (1844–1928)

Howson as Josephine

Emma Howson (28 March 1844 – 28 May 1928) was an Australian opera singer and actress primarily known as the creator of the principal soprano role of Josephine in the Gilbert and Sullivan comic opera H.M.S. Pinafore.

She began her operatic career in Australia as a teen. In her early 20s Howson's family moved to America, where she played leading roles in opera, Victorian burlesque, other dramatic forms, and on the concert stage. After vocal studies in Italy, she continued her career in England where, in 1878, she joined Richard D'Oyly Carte's company to originate the role of Josephine. In the early 1880s, she returned to the US where she continued to perform and, within a decade, retired to teach music.

== Early life and career ==
Howson was born in Hobart Town, Tasmania, and performed as a child in concerts with her father, Frank (a baritone and conductor) and her brothers. She was the niece of opera singer Emma Albertazzi (also born Emma Howson). Her father, with his tenor brother, John, moved to Sydney in 1845 and remained based there until 1866 when, at the suggestion of American actor Joseph Jefferson, the family moved to the United States. One of Howson's early mentors and teachers in Sydney was the English contralto Sara Flower. As a teen, Howson performed roles in such operas as The Night Dancers, The Mountain Sylph, The Rose of Castille, Il Trovatore and the opera adaptation of Guy Mannering, as well as in pantomime, Victorian burlesque, and on the concert stage.

In America, Howson performed in English-language opera as Amina in La Sonnambula (1866) as well as in comedy, drama, farce and burlesque with her family. Over the next three years in her engagements in California, including as the leading lady in La Grande-Duchesse de Gérolstein, La belle Hélène and Barbe-bleue, she earned critical acclaim as "the best operatic artist now in California". The family troupe worked its way east, through Salt Lake City, where the Howsons were the first opera troupe seen by the Mormons. Her father died of cancer during that tour in 1869, and her mother died some months afterwards. The family eventually arrived in New York, where Howson starred in Le roi Carotte and Maritana. In major North American cities, she played roles in Fra Diavolo, The Bohemian Girl, Martha, Oberon, The Marriage of Figaro, Der Freischütz and Il Trovatore. In 1873, she travelled to Europe with her brother Frank and studied in Milan, Italy, for two years. She debuted in Malta as Amina in La Sonnambula in 1875. In 1876, she arrived in England and toured in Italian operas in the English provinces.

== Pinafore and later years ==
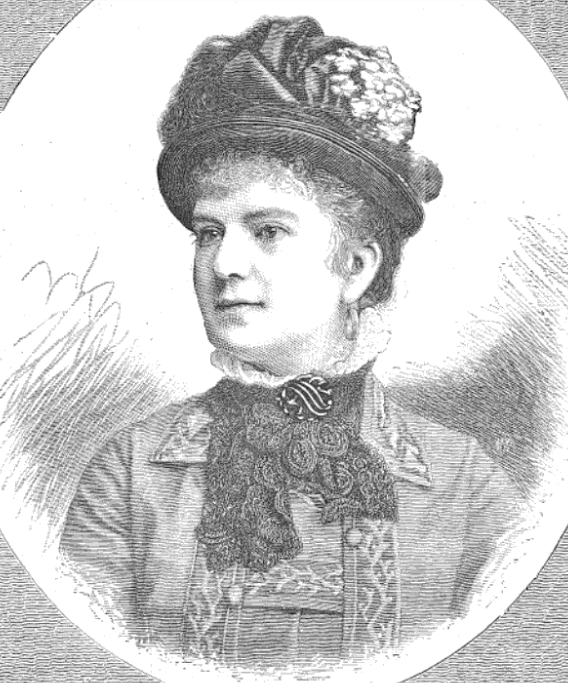
Howson, c.1878

She joined Richard D'Oyly Carte's Comedy Opera Company at the Opera Comique in May 1878, creating the role of Josephine in Gilbert and Sullivan's comic opera H.M.S. Pinafore, which became a sensation. She earned excellent notices from the critics and was popular with audiences. The Era noted after the opening night, "Miss Emma Howson is one of the brightest, liveliest little ladies imaginable. She has a voice of charming quality, pure, sweet, and admirably in tune. Her singing at once established her in the good graces of the audience, and her acting was full of intelligence and comic talent." Howson left the D'Oyly Carte's company in April 1879. She next starred in The Beggar's Opera. During this period, her elder brother, John (died 1887), was the leading man in the long-running London production of Les cloches de Corneville.

She and her brother returned to the US early in the 1880s, where they both performed in Gilbert and Sullivan and toured in other works. There she reprised Josephine in Pinafore and played the title role in Patience opposite John as Bunthorne. He impersonated Oscar Wilde to the delight of the crowd at a train stop during Wilde's American tour. In the early 1890s, she retired from the stage and settled in Brooklyn, New York, where she taught music.

Howson died in New York in June 1928 at the age of 84 and was buried in Green-Wood Cemetery in Brooklyn. Her nephew was the actor Albert Howson.

== See also ==
- Howson family
