= Anne Clarke (theatre manager) =

Australian theatre manager

Anne Clarke née Remans (born 1806), was a pioneering actress, singer and theatre manager in Tasmania, Australia, significant as the first woman to manage an Australian theatre, being director of the Theatre Royal, Hobart, in 1840–1847.

== Life ==
Anne Remans and fellow-actress Dinah Rudelhoff were brought out to Tasmania from England in 1834 under a sponsorship scheme, and first appeared with J. P. Deane's company, which at the time was playing at the Argyle Rooms in Hobart. Deane was early criticised for unfairly monopolizing their services. This was just one year after the introduction of professional theatre in Tasmania by the travelling company of Samson and Cordelia Cameron from England, and only two years after the first professional performance in Australia, at Barnett Levey's Royal Hotel in Sydney in December 1832. making her one of the first professional actors active in Australia.

In November 1834, by which time she had married Michael Clarke, she took part in Kotzebue's The Stranger with Deane's company, as Mrs Haller, a part previously taken in Hobart by Cordelia Cameron. Clarke performed with the Camerons' theatre company in 1834–36 and with that of their rival John Meredith in 1836–40.

=== Manager ===
In April 1840, she became the manager of Theatre Royal. Though Cordelia Cameron managed the theatre in Launceston in 1836 and was as such the first woman theatre director in Australia de facto, Cameron only did so as the proxy of her spouse during his absence, and Clarke was thereby the first woman to have formally been theatre director in Australia.

She recruited new actors from England in 1841–42, composed of Jerome Carandini, Theodosia Stirling, John Howson and Frank Howson of the celebrated Howson family of entertainers. By importing professional actors, she is said to have established acting as a respectable profession for both sexes in Australia. By advertising for respectable women interested in becoming actors, and giving them training, she introduced a new profession for women in the colony. The actors of her company somewhat became the pioneer Australian actor generation, many of whom moved on to careers in Melbourne and Sydney.

She was highly commended for her work, credited by the press with introducing 'a better class of performer and a superior style of management' and for giving theatre, which was then regarded as somewhat dubious, a good name. In July 1842, she applied to Parliament for an official government license for her theatre, thereby separating it from other places of entertainment and making it a respected institution: in September that year, the "Act for regulating Places of Public Entertainment and for punishing Persons Keeping disorderly Houses.", was passed. She is credited for having given the foundation for professional music life in the colony. The contemporary press credited her for her work developing the cultural life in the colony. She was regarded as an efficient businessperson and a progressive artist.

Despite her critical and artistic success, Clarke was forced to retire in 1847. The colony was small and the theatre struggled financially. She was by then separated from her spouse, and her later life is unknown. In the 1860s her theatre was still regarded as the role model for theatre life in the colony.

== See also ==
- Mrs W. H. Foley
