= Howson family =

Australian show-business dynasty

The Howson family was a show-business dynasty founded in Australia, several of whose members went on to further success in America, London and Europe.

== Family ==
Francis Howson (1794 – 13 April 1863) was an English pianist, arranger and voice coach. He married Sarah Sophie Tanner (1796 – 5 November 1839). Their children were given instruction in music and singing, with satisfactory results, particularly their daughter Emma and sons Frank and John. In 1841 his sons Frank (born 1818), John (born 1819), and Henry (born 1822), were recruited by theatre manager Anne Clarke, who needed talent for her theatre in Hobart, Tasmania, and together with Frank's wife Emma and child, left on the ship Sydney, arriving in Hobart on 28 January 1842. They were joined on 21 August 1843 by "W. Howson" and "A. Howson" on the bark Eamont The first has been identified as William Edwin and the second as Alfred, about whom nothing has been found. On 2 March 1844 they were joined by their father, two youngest brothers Frederick (born before 1835) and Walter (born before 1835), also a Miss Howson, most likely Sarah Clelia (born 1820s). They travelled by the ship Alfred from London to Sydney and Louisa for the last leg of the journey.

In September 1857 Frank Howson, John Howson and Sarah Clelia Howson (Note: Frank and John were 39 and 38 respectively; Clelia was around 30) performed a concert of sacred music in a choir led by Anna Bishop at the Prince of Wales Theatre, Sydney

Francis settled in Launceston, where, known as "Frank Howson, senior", he gave singing lessons. His advertisements made much of the success achieved by his daughter Emma, known as Madame Albertazzi. He later became insolvent, clearing his debts in 1859. He took part in the family's presentation of Handel's Messiah at the Theatre Royal, Castlemaine, Victoria in March 1863, died from exposure in Parramatta, New South Wales, a month later.

Children of Francis and Sarah Howson include:

- Emma Howson, best known as Emma Albertazzi (1 May 1815 – 25 September 1847), contralto; on 25 November 1829, at age 15, married Francesco (or Francis) Albertazzi (1807–1857).
- Frank Howson (20 September 1818 – 16 September 1869) married actress Emma Richardson (9 October 1820 – 7 December 1869) on 9 October 1838 in London, and travelled to Hobart in 1842 aboard Sydney.

He performed in a touring minstrel show with J. P. Hydes (Note: John Proctor Hydes (c. 1825 – 22 October 1882)) in Sydney in 1848–1851; in the last year included John, then Henry and Walter.
He had success in Australia as a baritone, comedian, stage director and manager, including Victoria Theatre, Brisbane, in 1865. He produced opera in conjunction with Catherine Hayes, Anna Bishop, and Lady Don. In 1866 he left with his wife and family for America, where he formed the "Howson Family Troupe", later styled "Howson English and Italian Opera Troupe", with daughters Emma and Clelia, and son Frank A. Howson.
After some unfortunate incident with Lady Don, details yet to find, he refused to share the stage with her. They had previously supported her return concert at the opening of the Haymarket Theatre, Melbourne in August 1864.
He died in Omaha, Nebraska. Their children included:
- Frank A. Howson (Francis Alfred Girolamo Howson) (28 March 1841 – 28 June 1926) played violoncello, in 1866 moved to New York where, according to IBDB, he worked 1872–1908 as musical director on Broadway, including Madison Square Theatre. It is likely he was the Frank Howson who wrote incidental music for the American premiere of Pinero's Trelawney of the 'Wells' in November 1898. In 1925 he composed a new setting for Rudyard Kipling's song "Rolling Down to Rio". He married Emma Amelia Hinchman (1858–1923). Their family included:

- Albert Sidney Howson (3 February 1881 – 2 August 1960) was born in New York, became stage and film actor and Warner Bros. department head.
- Charles Edwin Howson (6 August 1887 – 1 October 1916) joined Nova Scotia Regiment, Canadian Army, killed in France.
- Ethel Mildred Howson (22 June 1891 – 1977) married Leslie Clifford Hartley.

- John Jerome Howson (17 November 1842 – 16 December 1887), known as John Howson or (rarely) J. Jerome Howson, actor, singer, was born in Melbourne. or Hobart; left for America, played opera bouffe comedies. He played in, and occasionally conducted, Gilbert and Sullivan.
- Emma Howson (28 March 1844 – 28 May 1928) made her stage debut on 23 December 1858; was prima donna with Campobello-Sinico Grand Concert Party in 1878 born in Hobart. She had a considerable career in Gilbert and Sullivan, creating the role of Josephine in H.M.S. Pinafore in London.
- Clelia Sarah Howson (8 June 1845 – 28 October 1931), was born in Hobart, made her stage debut on 23 December 1858; played soubrette roles, moved to New York in 1866, married Hosmer Buskingham Parsons, a wealthy Wells Fargo merchant. She retired from the stage, died in New York.
- William Sydney Howson (23 September 1846 – 17 May 1900)
- Charles Edwin Howson (15 January 1848 – 4 November 1907), born in Sydney, studied in Milan from 1873 He had two daughters, Clelia and Amy, both actresses in London. Sons William and Charles were both portrait photographers in London in later years.

- John Howson (9 October 1819 – 4 September 1871) married Margaret Sylvia Galvin (died c. 24 August 1880), daughter of William Joseph Galvin in 1849. A tenor singer, he appeared with brother Frank in "Howard's (Ethiopian) Serenaders" in 1850; wrote song "Angry Words" for Sara Flower.

A music teacher of Hotham, Victoria, also referred to as William John Howson, he died after being struck by a cart on Queensberry Street, Carlton, Victoria. Margaret Howson had two children, one conceived while her husband was away.

- Henry Howson (6 March 1822 – 17 April 1893) also on the Sydney, was musical conductor of the old Victoria Theatre, later Theatre Royal, Hobart where, according to H. P. Lyons, (Note: Henry Percival Lyons (1841 – 28 June 1913),) he was known as Alfred Howson. He joined the gold rush to Victoria in 1852, and later opened a music shop in Golden Square (aka Market Square), Castlemaine, where he lived until 1890. He was leader of Castlemaine Philharmonic Society, 1859 – 1865 died 3 Frederick Street, Glenferrie, buried at Castlemaine. He married Harriett Slee (12 January 1823 – 4 January 1899), daughter of Josiah Slee (died 18 January 1838 at New Norfolk, Tasmania) and Harriett Slee (died 3 December 1854 at Carisbrook Victoria). Their children included:

- Ida Slee Howson (5 May 1847 – 24 December 1920) was born in Sandy Bay, Tasmania, taught piano in Castlemaine. She married Frederick Ewen Bull on 16 March 1871. She organised concerts with Henry Josiah Howson (Note: Nothing has been found on Henry Josiah Howson, who was associated with Ida Slee Howson (1847–1920) and Maude Effie Howson (c. 1857–1939) in concert management. He was perhaps the eldest son of Henry Howson, born sometime between 1847 and 1857. One Henry Josiah Howson of Campbell's Creek married Emily Jane Thomson on 4 January 1854.) and Maude Effie Howson. (no details found)
- Maude Effie Howson (c. 1857 – 18 January 1939) of Castlemaine/Mount Alexander was singer and pianist, married William Nathaniel McKail in July 1881
- second son (William) Frank Howson (1859 – 11 September 1930) of "Moodanong", Booligal, married Matilda Hazlett "Tillie" Reeves (c. 1861 – 26 January 1938) on 28 January 1885.
- Arthur Howson (1861 – 28 August 1931), pianist of Castlemaine; composed "Sunny Home Galop", published 1882. He married Emily Cleaves (c. 1862 – 2 June 1945) in 1885; children were Arthur, Victor, Cyril, Alfred, Percy, and Ivy (Mrs. Young).
- (Agnes) May Howson ( – 30 November 1923) married Carl C. F. Koster of Rewa, Suva, Fiji on 15 July 1889.
- Edward Slee "Ned" Howson (17 December 1866 – 9 October 1944) married "cousin" (Note: Edward Slee Howson was a grandson of Francis Howson, while Katherine Harriett Howson was a great-granddaughter of Francis Howson. Also remarkable was the 18+ years difference in their ages.) Katherine Harriett "Kitty" Howson (14 May 1885 – 1 September 1960), eldest daughter of Charles William Howson (died 1916), on 28 December 1915; they lived at "Moodanong", Castlemaine North.

- Denzil Edward Howson (3 September 1918 – 17 September 2005) married Dorothy Ellen Bradshaw on 15 February 1951. He was an actor, taking small parts in various TV series.

- Sarah Howson (c. 1824 – 1895) was a mezzo-soprano, styling herself as "Mdlle Albertazzi"; remained in England with her sister Emma Albertazzi, married Charles Egg on 8 May 1850.
- Sarah Clelia Howson (born c. 1820s) sang with brothers Frank and John in concert of sacred music September 1857. Perhaps the same person as Sarah Howson (1824–1895), but marriage to Charles Egg makes it less likely.
- William Edwin Howson (c. 1826 – 15 November 1898) played clarionet, returned to England in 1847. In 1884 he was employed by H.M.C.S., St John's Wood, London, England. He married Kathleen Fletcher, lived St Kilda. They had two sons:

- Frank Edward Howson (November 1851 – 18 June 1917) married Agnes Slee (14 July 1861 – 26 January 1890) on 9 April 1887. She was eldest daughter of Charles Slee of Newstead, Victoria, died in Fitzroy. Her remains were buried at Newstead (near Mount Alexander). (Note: Who was the A. Howson, pianist of Newstead in 1885? and the Mr Howson arrived in Newstead in 1869?)

- Jack Slee Howson (1889 – 8 August 1910) was eldest son.
He married again, to Flora Flintoff Carr (c. 1859 – 13 April 1932) on 13 July 1893 at Fitzroy, later of Wagga Wagga.
- Frank Howson (20 August 1894 – ) born in Barcaldine Qld in 1894, later of Macleay Street, Wagga Wagga

- Charles William Howson (c. 1853 – 9 July 1916) married Mary Augusta Bayles on 17 July 1884.

- eldest daughter Katherine Harriett (or Harriet) Howson (14 May 1885 – 1 September 1960) married "cousin" Edward Slee Howson (17 December 1866 – 9 October 1944) on 28 December 1915. See his entry above.

- Alfred Howson (born c. 1829) violinist, orchestra leader. Alfred and Henry Howson may be the same person, as asserted by H. P. Lyons.
- Walter Howson (born before 1835 – 13 January 1898) arrived in Hobart on 2 March 1844 with his father Francis, brother Frederick and a Miss C. Howson, identified as Miss Sarah Clelia Howson (born 1820s), about whom nothing has been found. Walter and Frederick were pupils of Mr Osborne in 1846. At a benefit for his father in Sydney, November 1848, Walter performed a minstrel song, accompanying himself on bones. He sang and played banjo, guitar in Howards' Serenaders in 1852–1853. (Note: Charles V. Howard and George B. Howard conducted and performed in minstrel shows, variously titled "Howards' Serenaders" and "Howards' Ethiopian Serenaders" in Australia from 1850 to 1856. They were previously members of Blyth Waterland's Serenaders, which became Waterland and Reading's Band.) He toured with brothers Frank, John and Henry, and J. P. Hydes in 1851 He purchased Wieland & (H. P.) Lyons' acrobatic troupe in 1869, died in South Africa.
- Frederick Howson (before 1835 – 28 July 1873) arrived in Sydney aboard Sydney and Hobart on Louisa with his father Francis Howson, brother Walter, and a Miss Sarah Clelia Howson (born 1820s) about whom nothing is known. Frederick and Walter were pupils of Mr. Osborne in 1846. He died in Soquel, Santa Cruz county, California. Australian newspapers recorded only his suicide; American newspapers reported how he was the lone survivor of a boating accident and three months later took an overdose of laudanum, dying the following day.

There is no reason to include John Michael Howson, whose paternal grandparents were William Howson (1886 – 7 May 1937), and Gertrude Eileen Howson, née Stack; he was a son of John Francis Howson (1853 – 2 June 1902), and Charlotte Howson, née Finch. The same argument applies to his cousin, the 20th-century Australian actor and filmmaker Frank Michael Howson.
