= Lead, Kindly Light =

Christian hymn

Lead, Kindly Light, amid the encircling gloom
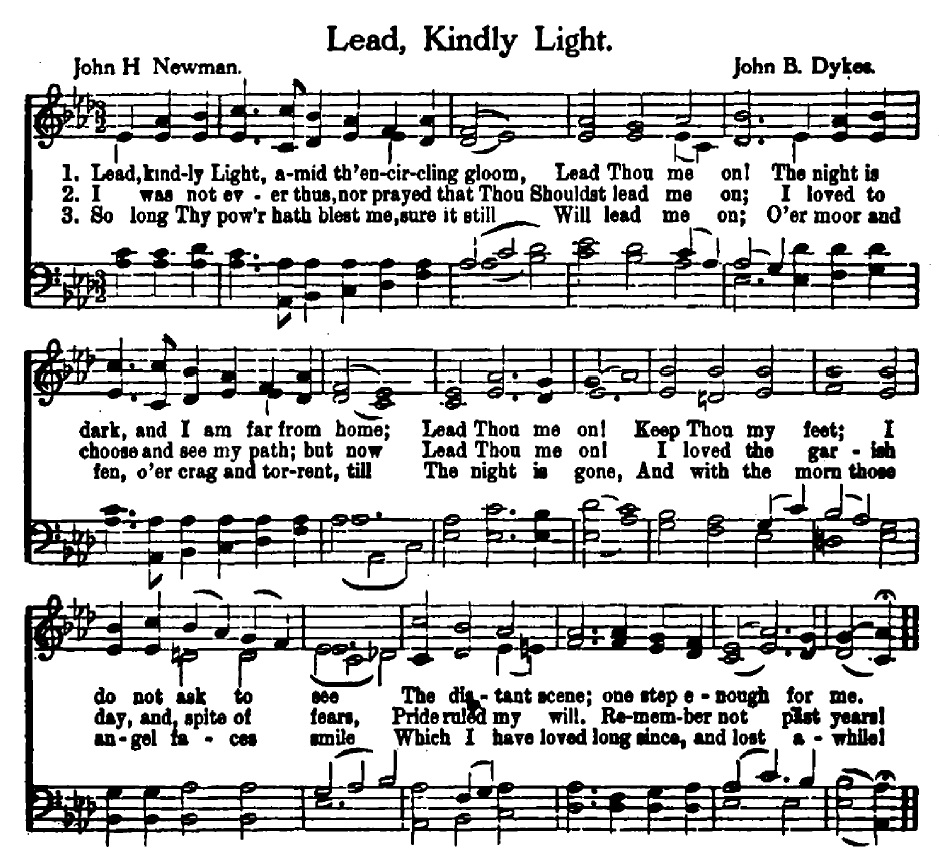
- "Lead, Kindly Light" (tune: Lux Benigna)
- Genre: Hymn
- Written: 1833
- Text: John Henry Newman
- Based on: Exodus 13:21-22
- Meter: 10.4.10.4.10.10
- Melody: Alberta – William H. Harris; Sandon – Charles H. Purday; Lux Benigna – J.B. Dykes

"Lead, Kindly Light, Amid the encircling gloom" is a hymn with words written in 1833 by John Henry Newman as a poem titled "the Pillar of the Cloud", which was first published in the British Magazine in 1834, and republished in Lyra Apostolica in 1836.

== History ==
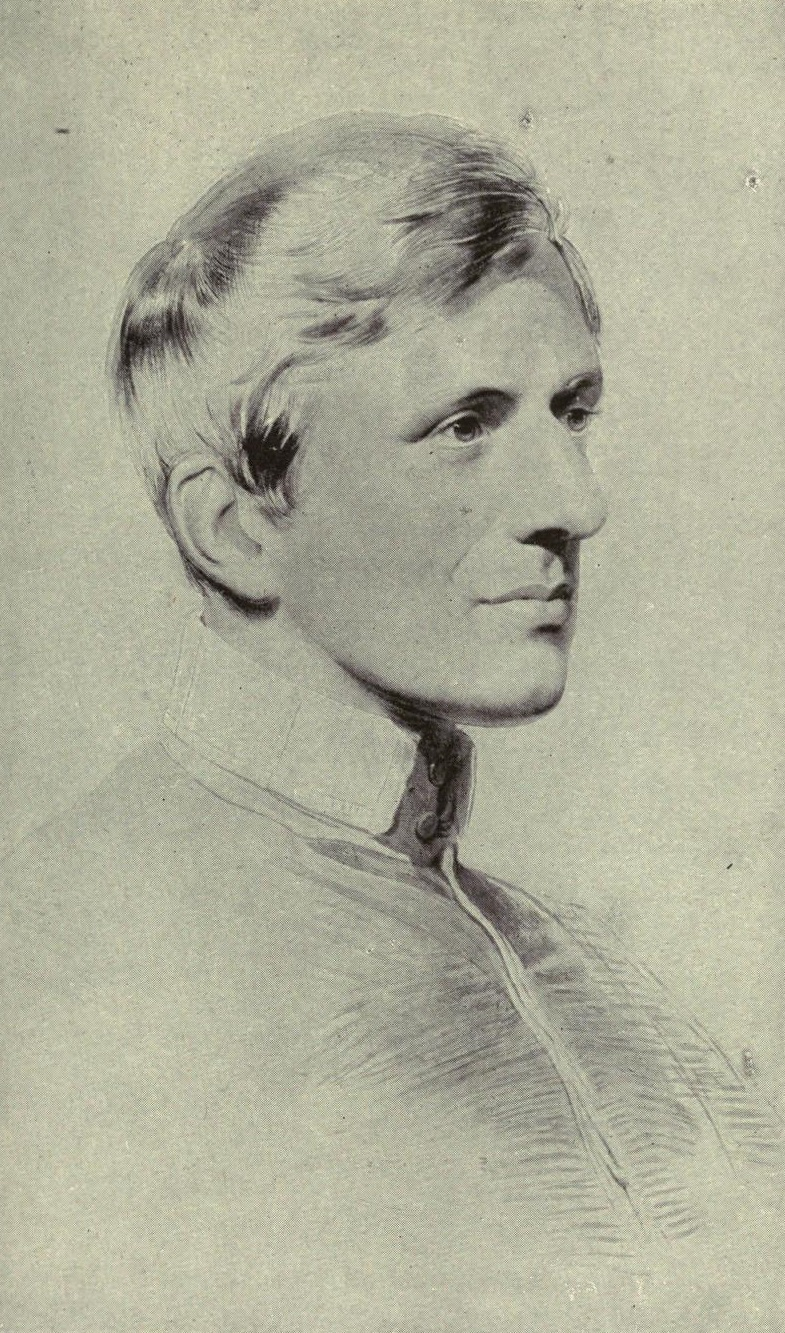
Author John Henry Newman

As a young priest, Newman became sick while in Italy and was unable to travel for almost three weeks. In his Apologia Pro Vita Sua, Newman described the writing thus:

Before starting from my inn in the morning of May 26th or 27th, I sat down on my bed and began to sob violently. My servant, who had acted as my nurse, asked what ailed me. I could only answer, "I have a work to do in England." I was aching to get home; yet for want of a vessel I was kept at Palermo for three weeks. I began to visit the Churches, and they calmed my impatience, though I did not attend any services. I knew nothing of the Presence of the Blessed Sacrament there. At last I got off in an orange boat, bound for Marseilles. Then it was that I wrote the lines, "Lead, kindly light", which have since become well known. We were becalmed a whole week in the Straits of Bonifacio. I was writing verses the whole time of my passage.

== Tune ==
The first musical setting of "Lead, Kindly Light" was published in Hymns Ancient and Modern in 1868, set to the hymn tune Lux Benigna, specially composed for the hymn by John Bacchus Dykes. Newman ascribed the popularity of the hymn to Dykes' tune. The hymn was later set to the tune Bonifacio by David Evans. When the hymn was republished in the 1931 edition of Songs of Praise, it was set to a tune by William Henry Harris entitled Alberta, which he had composed in 1924 on a train crossing Canada. The theologian David Brown notes that Lux Benigna has been criticised for its Victorian sentimentality, and that Dykes' once-popular tune has fallen out of favour, while Harris's Alberta has gained popularity.

Other popular settings of the hymn include Charles H. Purday's tune Sandon, composed in 1860, and Arthur Sullivan's tune, Lux in Tenebris, which Ian Bradley praises as a "much more sensitive and honest setting of Newman's ambiguity and expressions of doubt" than Dykes's "steady, reassuring" rhythms.

"Lead, Kindly Light" has also been set as a choral anthem by Sir John Stainer (1886).

== Notable occasions relating to hymn ==
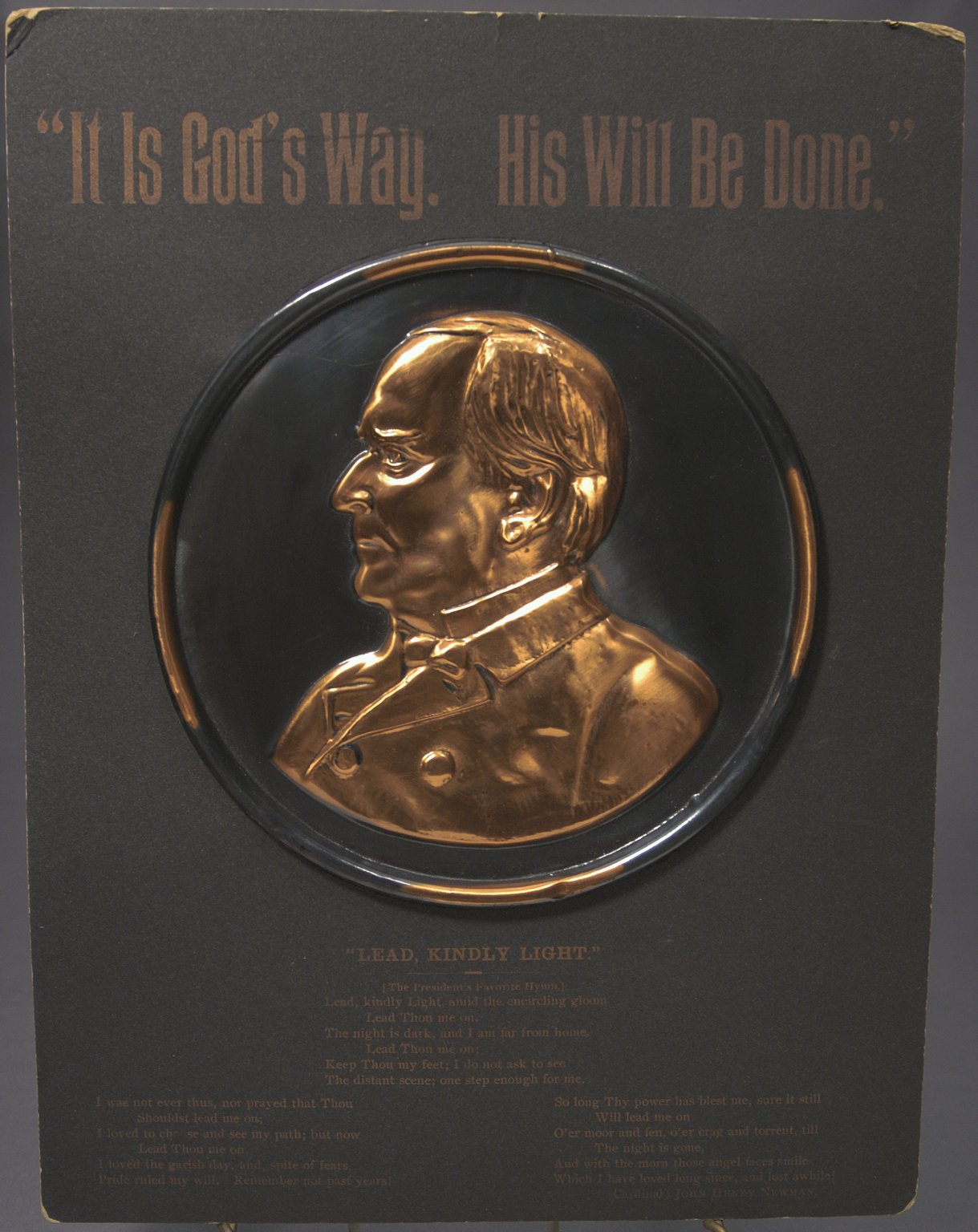
Portrait plaque of U.S. president William McKinley, labelled "It is God's Way – Lead, Kindly Light", c. 1901

The largest mining disaster in the Durham Coalfield in England was at West Stanley Colliery, known locally as "The Burns Pit", when 168 men and boys lost their lives as the result of two underground explosions at 3:45pm on Tuesday 16 February 1909. In the Towneley Seam 63 lay dead, in the Tilley Seam 18 lay dead, in the Busty Seam 33 lay dead and in the Brockwell Seam 48 lay dead. But incredibly, there were still men alive underground. A group of 34 men and boys in the Tilley Seam had found a pocket of clean air. They were led by Deputy Mark Henderson. A few of them panicked and left the group, they died instantly after inhaling the poison gas. The remainder sat in almost total darkness, when one of them began humming the Hymn "Lead Kindly Light". In no time at all, the rest of the miners joined in with the words, "Lead kindly light amidst the encircling gloom, lead thou me on, The night is dark, and I am far from home". This was probably sung to the tune "Sandon" by C. H. Purday, popular with miners in the Durham coalfield. Before the hymn ended, young Jimmy Gardner died of injuries. These 26 men were rescued after 14 hours; four others were later rescued.

"Lead, Kindly Light" was sung by Betsie ten Boom, sister of Corrie ten Boom, and other women as they were led by the S.S. Guards to the Ravensbrück concentration camp during the Holocaust.

"Lead, Kindly Light" was sung by a soloist, Marion Wright, on the RMS Titanic during a hymn-singing gathering led by the Rev. Ernest C. Carter, shortly before the ocean liner struck an iceberg on April 14, 1912. The hymn was also sung aboard one of the Titanic's lifeboats when the rescue ship Carpathia was sighted the following morning. It was suggested by one of the occupants, Noëlle, Countess of Rothes.

On one occasion in February 1915, "Lead, Kindly Light" was sung by a group of British troops to the accompaniment of nearby artillery fire on the Western Front during the First World War at services held before going into the trenches the following day.

Since 1922, the hymn "Lead, Kindly Light" is still sung in the morning of famous SB College Changanassery in Kerala which is said to halt everyone in the region, from their work. It is also the motto for the Cambridge High School, Abu Dhabi, United Arab Emirates; the Millennium School, Dubai, United Arab Emirates; Our Own English High School, United Arab Emirates; The Little Flower Higher Secondary School, Salem, Tamil Nadu, India; Soundararaja Vidyalaya, Dindigul, Tamil Nadu, India; Mangalam College of Engineering, Ettumanoor, Kerala, India; St. Thomas Public School, Pune, Maharashtra, India; Sri Kumaran Children's Home, Bangalore, Karnataka, India and for De Paul School, Kuravilangad, Kerala (Malayalam translation).

The hymn is referred to in Chapter LVI titled 'Beauty in Loneliness – After All' from Thomas Hardy's novel Far From The Madding Crowd.

The hymn was also a favourite of Mahatma Gandhi and is mentioned at the Gandhi Museum in Madurai, Tamil Nadu.

It was the favourite hymn of Percy French (1854–1920), who died suddenly in January 1920 at the home of his cousin in Formby, England. He was on his way back to his family after a final entertainment in Glasgow. These lines from "Lead Kindly Light" are etched on his grave in Saint Luke's Church, Formby:

So long thy power hath blessed me
Sure it still will lead me on,
O'er moor and fen, o'er crag and torrent;
Till the night is gone.

== Lyrics ==
Lead, Kindly Light, amidst th'encircling gloom,
Lead Thou me on!
The night is dark, and I am far from home,
Lead Thou me on!
Keep Thou my feet; I do not ask to see
The distant scene; one step enough for me.

I was not ever thus, nor prayed that Thou
Shouldst lead me on;
I loved to choose and see my path; but now
Lead Thou me on!
I loved the garish day, and, spite of fears,
Pride ruled my will. Remember not past years!

So long Thy power hath blest me, sure it still
Will lead me on.
O'er moor and fen, o'er crag and torrent, till
The night is gone,
And with the morn those angel faces smile,
Which I have loved long since, and lost awhile!

=== Pirate Verse ===
Edward Henry Bickersteth (later Bishop of Exeter) added a fourth 'pirate verse' for the poem's republication in the Hymnal Companion in 1870. It reads:

Meantime, along the narrow rugged path,
Thyself hast trod,
Lead, Saviour, lead me home in childlike faith,
Home to my God.
To rest forever after earthly strife
In the calm light of everlasting life.

Newman was not pleased, writing to the publishers: "It is not that the verse is not both in sentiment and language graceful and good, but I think you will at once see how unwilling an author must be to subject himself to the inconvenience of that being ascribed to him which is not his own." This verse is not usually included in modern printings of the hymn.

== See also ==
- Pillar of Cloud
