= Macready =

Macready is a surname. Notable people with the surname include:

- Agnes Macready (1855–1935), Australian nurse and journalist
- Carol MacReady, English actress
- Edward Nevil Macready, (1798–1848), British Army officer
- George Macready (1899–1973), American screen actor
- Gordon Macready (1891–1956), British Army officer
- Nevil Macready (1862–1946), British Army officer
- John Macready (gymnast) (born 1975), American gymnast and motivational speaker
- John A. Macready (1887–1979), American aviator
- William Macready (1793–1873), English actor
- William Macready the elder (1755–1829), Irish actor-manager
- Paul MacCready (1925–2007), American aeronautical engineer

== Fictional characters ==
- MacCready, supporting character voiced by Matthew Mercer in the video game Fallout 4
- R.J MacReady, protagonist of The Thing
- McReady, protagonist of Who Goes There ? (same character)

== See also ==
- Macready baronets
