= Albert Howson =

American actor

Albert S. Howson (3 February 1881 – 2 August 1960) was an American actor and head of the censorship department at Warner Brothers, who lived in Forest Hills Gardens, Queens.

He made his stage debut in New York in 1898 and appeared in 21 Broadway plays spanning 30 years, as well as seven films during World War I. Notable roles include Kassim Baba in the original Broadway production of Chu Chin Chow. He also wrote the 1927 silent film Matinee Ladies.

Howson, whose middle name has been reported as Sidney or Sydney, was a nephew of Australian opera singer Emma Howson of the Howson family.

== Selected filmography ==
- The Better Man (1914)
- The Vampire (1915)
- My Madonna (1915)
