= Cordelia Cameron =

Australian stage actor and theatre manager (1809–1892)

Cordelia Ann Cameron née Bouchier (1809–1892), was an Australian stage actor and theatre manager. She was the first woman theater manager in Australia.

== Life ==
Cordelia Cameron was married to her colleague, the actor-manager Samson Cameron, and managed a travelling theater company with him. The Camerons arrived with their company of actors to Tasmania in 1833. They introduced professional theatre in Tasmania with their performances in Hobart in December 1833 and in Launceston beginning June 1834, only one year after the introduction of professional theatre in Sydney in the Australian mainland. They also sent for a number of professional actors from England, many of whom came to play an important part in the history of Australian theatre, such as Anne Clarke (theatre manager).

Samson Cameron made frequent trips to Sydney in an (ultimately unsuccessful) attempt to establish a theatre there, Cordelia Cameron was often left in charge of his business in Tasmania: in 1834, she became the first woman theatre manager in Tasmania and Australia when she managed their theatre in Launceston during her husband's stay in Sydney, although she did so as his proxy rather than in her own name.

While Samson Cameron came to be known foremost for his work as theatre manager, Cordelia Cameron was highly regarded in contemporary Australia for her ability onstage and was seen as a role model by many contemporary actresses, who imitated many of her stage mannerisms.

The Camerons were eventually no longer able to compete against the growing competition in Tasmania, and left the island in 1844.
