= William Howson (footballer) =

English footballer

Personal information
- Date of birth: 1892
- Place of birth: Garforth, England
- Height: 5 ft 6 in (1.68 m)
- Position: Inside left

Senior career*
Years	Team	Apps	(Gls)
- Castleford Town
1920–1923	Bradford City	58	(16)
- Oldham Athletic
- * Club domestic league appearances and goals

William Howson (born 1892) was an English professional footballer who played as an inside left.

== Career ==
Born in Garforth, Howson played for Castleford Town, Bradford City and Oldham Athletic. For Bradford City, he made 58 appearances in the Football League; he also made 6 FA Cup appearances.

== Sources ==
- Frost, Terry (1988). Bradford City A Complete Record 1903-1988. Breedon Books Sport. ISBN 0-907969-38-0.
