= Joseph Mainzer =

German music teacher

Abbé Joseph Mainzer
- Born: October 21, 1801; Trèves, Sarre, French First Republic
- Died: November 10, 1851 (aged 50); Manchester, Salford Hundred, Lancashire, England
- Occupation(s): Miner, priest
- Era: Romantic
- Movement: Singing class

Joseph Mainzer (21 October 1801 – 10 November 1851) was a German music teacher, who spent the last period of his life in the United Kingdom, promoting a vision of choral singing for the masses, as part of the singing class movement.

== Life ==
Born at Trèves on 21 October 1801, Mainzer was educated in the maîtrise of Trier Cathedral, and learned several musical instruments. He subsequently worked in the Saar coal mines with a view to becoming an engineer; and after a time was ordained a Catholic priest in 1826, afterwards being made an abbé. He was appointed singing-master to the college at Trier.

Mainzer left Prussia on account of his political opinions, and in 1833 went to Brussels. There he wrote an opera, and acted as musical editor of L'Artiste. Moving to Paris, he taught popular singing classes and contributed musical articles to journals.

In 1839 Mainzer emigrated to the United Kingdom, and in 1841 he competed unsuccessfully for the music chair at the University of Edinburgh. He remained in Edinburgh till about 1848, when he left for Manchester. There he died, 10 November 1851.

== Works ==
Mainzer's best-known work was Singing for the Million, London, 1841. It passed through many editions, and its title was taken by Thomas Hood as the subject of a humorous poem. The system was the French method of solfège with absolute pitch: Mainzer himself had success with it. His other works include:

- Singschule: oder Praktische Anweisung zum Gesange, Trier, 1831.
- Treatise on Musical Grammar and the Principles of Harmony London, 1843.
- The Gaelic Psalm Tunes of Ross-shire and the Neighbouring Counties, Edinburgh, 1844, mostly recorders from the singing of the traditional teachers.
- The Standard Psalmody of Scotland, Edinburgh, 1845, based on the old tunes in John Knox's Psalter.
- Music and Education, London, 1848.

Mainzer's Musical Times, which he founded, was the basis of The Musical Times, still published. His musical compositions were largely ephemeral.
