= Howison =

Howison is a surname of Scottish origin which means "the son of Hugh." Notable people with the surname include:

- Alexander Howison Murray Jr. (1903–1997), mayor of Placerville, California
- Del Howison (born 1953), American horror author
- George Holmes Howison (1834–1916), American philosopher
- Henry L. Howison (1837–1914), American naval officer
- John Howison (c.1530–1618), Scottish minister
- Ryan Howison (born 1966), American golfer

== See also ==
- Howson
- Howie
