= Emma Albertazzi =

English opera singer (1815–1847)

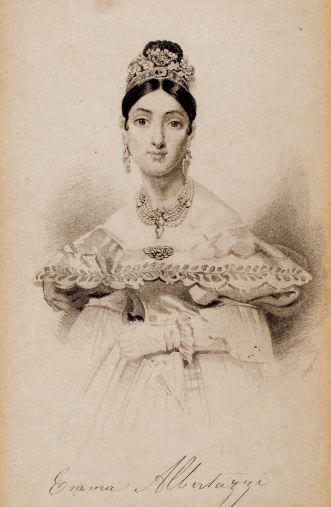
Emma Albertazzi

Emma Albertazzi (née Howson; 1 May 1815 – 25 September 1847) was an English operatic contralto. She began her opera career in Italy, France and Spain, making her British debut in 1837. Critics praised the beauty of her voice but found her acting too "ladylike" and lacking energy. She also sang prolifically on the concert stage. After giving birth to her fifth child, she returned briefly to singing, but died only months later at the age of 32.

== Early life and career ==
Albertazzi was born in Streatham, London, the daughter of Francis Howson (died 1863), an English music professor, and his wife Sarah, née Tanner (died 1839). She had three brothers and a sister, several of whom became performers and some of whom established the Howson family musical dynasty in Australia; her niece was Emma Howson. As a child, Albertazzi studied with a music teacher, Andrea Costa. In 1827, she moved in with Costa, and her parents signed a contract with him.

Her first public performance was in 1828 at the New Argyle Rooms, London, and she performed in a concert the following year at the King's Theatre Concert Room. In 1829 a young Italian, Francesco Albertazzi (died 1857), also began to study with Costa, and the two married in London on 25 November 1829; the bride was 14 years old. Her husband signed additional contracts with Costa. Sources variously report Albertazzi's activities over the next year or so, but she performed in Milan, Italy, in a concert at the Teatro Rè in September 1831.

== Operatic career ==
In July 1832, she appeared as the heroine in Adelina by Pietro Generali at Milan's Teatro della Canobbiana; this was apparently her operatic debut. In December, while still in Milan, she gave birth to her first child, Maria Caroline Clelia Albertazzi. The following year she appeared at La Scala in Il nuovo Figaro by Ricci. By July 1833, Albertazzi was singing Adina in L'elisir d'amore Teatro del Principe in Madrid. There she also appeared in Gli Arabi nelle Gallie, by Pacini, at the Teatro de la Cruz, and several other operas into 1835. She next went to Paris and was engaged at the Théâtre des Italiens where she began with the role of Jane Seymour in Anna Bolena and then the title role in La Cenerentola, followed by other roles there. In 1836 she returned to Italy to perform a season of roles at the Teatro Carignano in Turin, followed by another season in Paris, into 1837, where she continued to receive plaudits for her singing, though rarely her acting.

In 1837, she made her British operatic debut in La Cenerentola at the King's Theatre. The press notices were mostly ebullient, with many comparing Albertazzi's voice to that of Maria Malibran. She alternated busy seasons in London and Paris performing in opera and singing prolifically on the concert stage; among many other roles she performed as Ann Page in the world premiere of Balfe's Falstaff in July 1838.

During this time, her old singing teacher, Andrea Costa, sued her for 50% of her operatic earnings, based on the contracts that her parents and husband had signed. In Paris, in November 1839, she gave birth to her second daughter, Marianna Emma Clotilde Lucrecia Albertazzi. She soon returned for a summer concert tour of Europe and Britain. At the end of 1840, she rejoined the Théâtre des Italiens and followed the season with touring in Europe, avoiding London where the Costa case continued in the courts and the press. In 1841–1842, along with her operatic roles, Albertazzi continued to sing in may concerts, including in the première of Rossini's Stabat Mater.

She then gave concert tours in Italy and France, and gave birth to a third daughter, Fanny. In May 1843 she appeared as Adina in L'elisir d'amore at the Princess's Theatre in London, where she appeared in other roles that season, also singing in concerts in England. In January 1845, her fourth daughter, Emma Victorine Sarah Violet Albertazzi, was born. Albertazzi again earned warm reviews for her concert work during the 1845 season. After two seasons away from the operatic stage, she returned in June 1846, singing several roles at the Surrey Theatre. From October 1846, for the world premiere of Loder's opera The Wilis, or The Night Dancers, she sang the role of Giselle. She withdrew by January 1847 and gave birth to her fifth daughter, Sarah Henrietta Mary Albertazzi. She returned to the concert stage shortly thereafter, performing until March.

Albertazzi became ill that spring and died from tuberculous meningitis in September at her home in St John's Wood, London, at the age of 32.

== Reputation ==
In 1837 the critic of London's The Musical World called Albertazzi "a superb contralto with great range of compass upwards and though rather deficient in the descending scale, great flexibility, lightness and volume, correct intonation and polished execution. Her upper notes are equally steady and as full as those of a soprano; her great deficiencies are in power and in that animation which distinguishes the children of the south. Her transition to falsetto was without a break, and could she but throw her heart into her singing, we could have nothing against her. Her acting is miserably tame but ladylike and self-possessed. To see her Cenerentola ... was a rich treat". According to Baker's Biographical Dictionary of Musicians, she had a fine voice, but no passion or animation in singing or acting. Henry Fothergill Chorley expressed the same view in his musical memoirs. However, his near contemporary, dramatic author, Edward Fitzball took a different view: "As Ninetta in La Gazza Ladra, a more beautiful representative ... never presented itself to the tearful eye, or tender heart. ... Her voice was unsurpassable. ... Her singing of 'Di Piacer' is not to be described. [Her] … voice and execution have seldom been surpassed by a foreigner.
