= John Pyke Hullah =

English composer and teacher of music (1812–1884)

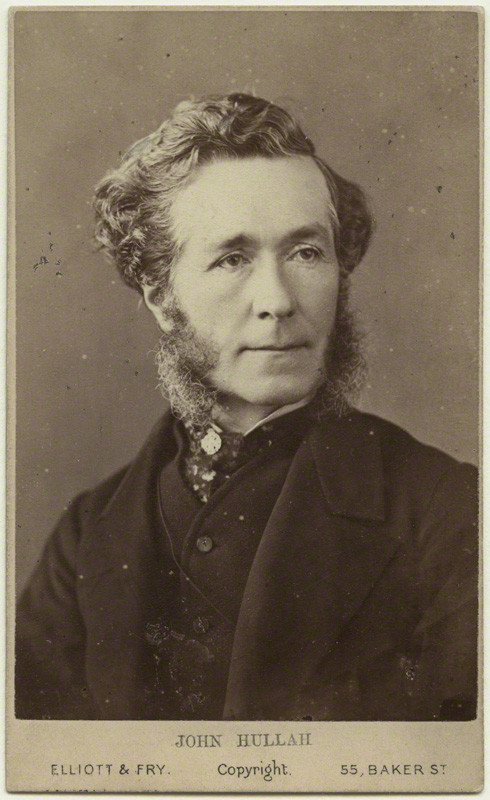
- Photograph by Elliott & Fry, 1860s

Background information
- Born: June 27, 1812; Worcester, England
- Died: February 21, 1884 (aged 71)
- Genres: Opera, ballads
- Occupations: Composer, music teacher, organist
- Years active: 1836–1883

John Pyke Hullah (27 June 1812 – 21 February 1884) was an English composer and teacher of music, whose promotion of vocal training is associated with the singing-class movement. He worked with Charles Dickens and knew Felix Mendelssohn.

== Life and career ==
Hullah was born at Worcester. He was a pupil of William Horsley from 1829, and entered the Royal Academy of Music in 1833. He wrote an opera to words by Dickens, The Village Coquettes, produced in 1836; The Barbers of Bassora in 1837; and The Outpost in 1838, the last two at Covent Garden. From 1839, when he went to Paris to investigate various systems of teaching music to large masses of people, he identified himself with Wilhem's system of the fixed "do," in contrast to the moveable "do" of the Tonic sol-fa. His adaptation of Wilhem's system was taught with enormous success from 1840 to 1860. His first-ever lesson was given at the Battersea College for training teachers (now University St Mark and St John Plymouth), in 1840, at the instigation of educationalist and college Principal James Kay Shuttleworth. His pupils included William Carter and Edmund Hart Turpin.

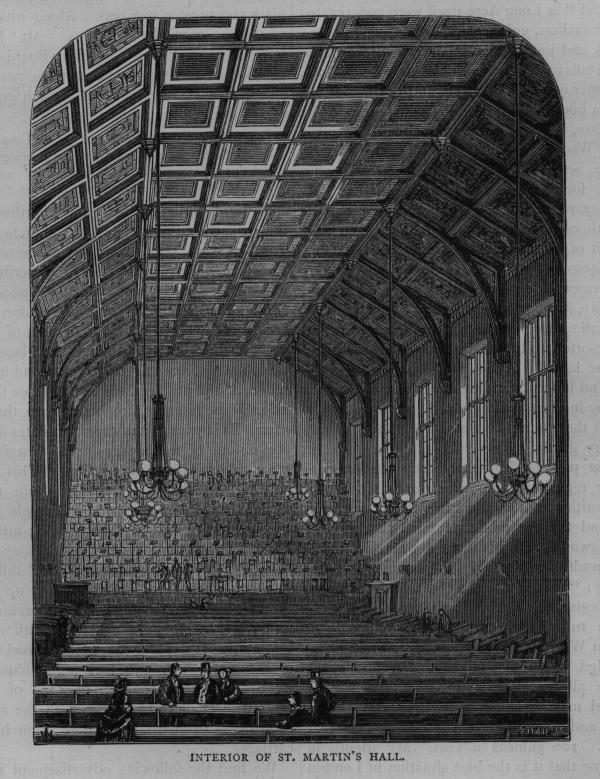
c.1850 print of the interior of St Martin's Hall.

In 1847 a large building in Long Acre, called St Martin's Hall, was built by subscription and presented to Hullah. It was inaugurated in 1850 and burnt to the ground in 1860, a blow from which Hullah was long in recovering. In 1849 William Sterndale Bennett, founder and chairman of the Bach Society, invited Hullah to join his committee, with a view to producing the first English performance of Johann Sebastian Bach's St Matthew Passion, which took place on 6 April 1854. As a sight-singing pioneer, Hullah produced his popular series Vocal Scores (1846) and Part-Music (1867). A series of lectures was given at the Royal Institution in 1861, and in 1864 he lectured in Edinburgh, but in the following year he was unsuccessful in his application for the Reid professorship.

He conducted concerts in Edinburgh in 1866 and 1867, and the concerts of the Royal Academy of Music from 1870 to 1873; he had been elected to the committee of management in 1869. In 1872 he was appointed by the Council of Education as Musical Inspector of Training Schools for the United Kingdom. In 1878 he went abroad to report on the condition of musical education in schools, and wrote a very valuable report, quoted in the memoir of him published by his wife in 1886. He was attacked by paralysis in 1880, and again in 1883.

Dr. Hullah was Honorary Fellow of King's College, London, and Professor of Vocal Music at Queen's College, London, and Bedford College, London. He succeeded Dr. Horsley as organist of the Charterhouse (in its original London location) in 1858, and held the post until his death. He received the honorary degree of Doctor of Laws from the University of Edinburgh in 1876.

His compositions, which remained popular for some years after his death in 1884, consisted mainly of ballads (such as his musical adaptation of Charles Kingsley's poem "Three Fishers"), but his importance in the history of music is due to his exertion in popularizing musical education, and his persistent opposition to the Tonic sol-fa system, which had a success he could not foresee. His objections to it were partly grounded on the character of the music which was in common use among the early teachers of the system.

The novelist Elizabeth Sara Sheppard portrayed Hullah as the character Lenhart Davy in her 1853 novel Charles Auchester. His widow, Frances Rosser Hullah, published a biography of her late husband.

== See also ==
- Psalmist movement

== Writings ==
- Wilhem's Method of Teaching Singing, adapted to English Use under Supervision of Committee of Council on Education (J.W. Parker, London 1841). Revised and Reconstructed Edition (Longmans & Co., London 1849). (After Guillaume Louis Bocquillon Wilhem (1781-1842).) (Further Editions, and in America as J. Hullah and J.B. Sharland, The Grammar School Chorus: containing Wilhem's Method of Teaching Vocal Music (Oliver Ditson & Co./C.H. Ditson & Co., Boston and New York 1860).)
- The Psalter: or Psalms of David in Metre from the Authorized Version of Brady and Tate with appropriate tunes, set in four parts (J.W. Parker, London 1843).
- An Introductory lecture, delivered at King's College, London, on Friday, February 2, 1844 (J.W. Parker, London 1844).
- The Duty and Advantage of Learning to Sing. A Lecture delivered at the Leeds Church Institution, February 1846. (J.W. Parker, London 1846).
- Chants, Chiefly by Masters of the Seventeenth and Eighteenth Centuries; with the Gregorian Tones harmonized by Thomas Morley (J.W. Parker, London 1847). 4th Edition (Longmans, London 1859).
- Musical Institute of London: Inaugural Address, Saturday, February 14, 1852 (J.W. Parker, London 1852).
- A Grammar of Musical Harmony: The Substance of Lectures Delivered in St. Martin's Hall and the Training Institutions of the National Society (J.W. Parker & Son, London 1852).
- Music in the Parish Church: A Lecture delivered at Newcastle-upon-Tyne, at a Meeting of the Durham and Northumberland Association for the Promotion of Church Music, November 27, 1855 (Longmans, London 1855).
- A Short Treatise on the Stave (Longmans, London, bef. 1856).
- The History of Modern Music; A Course of Lectures delivered at the Royal Institution of Great Britain (Parker, Son, & Bourn, London 1862). New & Enlarged Edition (Longmans, Green, Reader & Dyer, London 1875). (Further editions).
- A Grammar of Counterpoint, Part I (super-royal octavo) (Longman, Green, Longman, Roberts & Green, London 1864).
- A Course of Lectures on the Third or Transition Period of Musical History; Delivered at the Royal Institution of Great Britain (Longman, Green, Longman, Roberts & Green, London 1865). Second Edition (Longmans, Green & Co., London 1876) (Archive). (Further Editions).
- (as editor) The Song Book: Words and Tunes from the Best Poets and Musicians (Macmillan, London 1868).
- A Hymnal, chiefly from the Book of Praise by Roundell Palmer (Macmillan, London 1868).
- (as editor) 58 English Songs by Composers chiefly of the Seventeenth and Eighteenth Centuries (Augener & Co., London; G. Schirmer, New York, c. 1871).
- The Rudiments of Musical Harmony. New Edition, Revised and Reconstructed in 1872, in 2 Parts (Longmans, London).
- Time and Tune in the Elementary School: A New Method of Teaching Vocal Music (Longmans, Green, Reader & Dyer, London 1875).
- The Rudiments of Musical Grammar (Longmans, Green, Reader & Dyer, London 1876).
- Music in the House (Macmillan & Co., London 1877).
- The Cultivation of the Speaking Voice (Clarendon Press, Oxford 1884).
