= Charles H. Purday =

Scottish composer (1799–1885)

Charles Henry Purday (11 January 1799 – 1885) was a Scottish composer of music for hymns.

Purday was a precentor of the Church of Scotland, and was chosen to sing at the Coronation of Queen Victoria.

He was active in supporting strong copyright protection for composers and publishers; he was a foundation member of the Music Publishers Association.

== Compositions ==
=== Sacred ===
He wrote several hymn tunes for organ, which have been given the names:

- "Bayswater"
- "Gainsworth"
- "St Michael's"
- "Notting Hill"
- "Sandon", his most popular tune, familiar as "Lead, Kindly Light"
- "St Ulrich"

=== Profane ===
- "The Old English Gentleman"

== Publications ==
- Purday, C, H. (ed.), Songs for the young, sacred and moral (1851)
- Purday, C. H., Crown Court Psalmody (1854)
- Purday, C. H., Church and Home Metrical Psalter and Hymnal (1860)
- Purday, C. H. and Havergal, Francis, Songs of Peace and Joy (1879)
