= Musical Symbols (Unicode block) =

- Range: U+1D100..U+1D1FF (256 code points)
- Plane: SMP
- Scripts: Common (232 char.); Inherited (24 char.)
- Symbol sets: Modern musical notation
- Assigned: 256 code points
- Unused: 0 reserved code points

Unicode Version History
- 3.1 (2001): 219 (+219)
- 5.1 (2008): 220 (+1)
- 8.0 (2015): 231 (+11)
- 14.0 (2021): 233 (+2)
- 18.0 (2026): 256 (+23)

Unicode documentation
- Code chart ∣ Web page

Musical Symbols is a Unicode block containing characters for representing modern musical notation. Fonts that support it include Bravura, Euterpe, FreeSerif, Musica and Symbola. The Standard Music Font Layout (SMuFL), which is supported by the MusicXML format, expands on the Musical Symbols Unicode Block's 220 glyphs by using the Private Use Area in the Basic Multilingual Plane, permitting close to 2600 glyphs.

== Block ==
Musical Symbols^{[1]} Official Unicode Consortium code chart (PDF)
	0	1	2	3	4	5	6	7	8	9	A	B	C	D	E	F
U+1D10x	𝄀	𝄁	𝄂	𝄃	𝄄	𝄅	𝄆	𝄇	𝄈	𝄉	𝄊	𝄋	𝄌	𝄍	𝄎	𝄏
U+1D11x	𝄐	𝄑	𝄒	𝄓	𝄔	𝄕	𝄖	𝄗	𝄘	𝄙	𝄚	𝄛	𝄜	𝄝	𝄞	𝄟
U+1D12x	𝄠	𝄡	𝄢	𝄣	𝄤	𝄥	𝄦	𝄧	𝄨	𝄩	𝄪	𝄫	𝄬	𝄭	𝄮	𝄯
U+1D13x	𝄰	𝄱	𝄲	𝄳	𝄴	𝄵	𝄶	𝄷	𝄸	𝄹	𝄺	𝄻	𝄼	𝄽	𝄾	𝄿
U+1D14x	𝅀	𝅁	𝅂	𝅃	𝅄	𝅅	𝅆	𝅇	𝅈	𝅉	𝅊	𝅋	𝅌	𝅍	𝅎	𝅏
U+1D15x	𝅐	𝅑	𝅒	𝅓	𝅔	𝅕	𝅖	𝅗	𝅘	NULL; NOTE; HEAD	𝅚	𝅛	𝅜	𝅝	𝅗𝅥	𝅘𝅥
U+1D16x	𝅘𝅥𝅮	𝅘𝅥𝅯	𝅘𝅥𝅰	𝅘𝅥𝅱	𝅘𝅥𝅲	𝅥	𝅦	𝅧	𝅨	𝅩	𝅪	𝅫	𝅬	𝅭	𝅮	𝅯
U+1D17x	𝅰	𝅱	𝅲	BEGIN; BEAM	END; BEAM	BEGIN; TIE	END; TIE	BEGIN; SLUR	END; SLUR	BEGIN; PHR.	END; PHR.	𝅻	𝅼	𝅽	𝅾	𝅿
U+1D18x	𝆀	𝆁	𝆂	𝆃	𝆄	𝆅	𝆆	𝆇	𝆈	𝆉	𝆊	𝆋	𝆌	𝆍	𝆎	𝆏
U+1D19x	𝆐	𝆑	𝆒	𝆓	𝆔	𝆕	𝆖	𝆗	𝆘	𝆙	𝆚	𝆛	𝆜	𝆝	𝆞	𝆟
U+1D1Ax	𝆠	𝆡	𝆢	𝆣	𝆤	𝆥	𝆦	𝆧	𝆨	𝆩	𝆪	𝆫	𝆬	𝆭	𝆮	𝆯
U+1D1Bx	𝆰	𝆱	𝆲	𝆳	𝆴	𝆵	𝆶	𝆷	𝆸	𝆹	𝆺	𝆹𝅥	𝆺𝅥	𝆹𝅥𝅮	𝆺𝅥𝅮	𝆹𝅥𝅯
U+1D1Cx	𝆺𝅥𝅯	𝇁	𝇂	𝇃	𝇄	𝇅	𝇆	𝇇	𝇈	𝇉	𝇊	𝇋	𝇌	𝇍	𝇎	𝇏
U+1D1Dx	𝇐	𝇑	𝇒	𝇓	𝇔	𝇕	𝇖	𝇗	𝇘	𝇙	𝇚	𝇛	𝇜	𝇝	𝇞	𝇟
U+1D1Ex	𝇠	𝇡	𝇢	𝇣	𝇤	𝇥	𝇦	𝇧	𝇨	𝇩	𝇪	𝇫	𝇬	𝇭	𝇮	𝇯
U+1D1Fx	𝇰	𝇱	𝇲	𝇳	𝇴	𝇵	𝇶	𝇷	𝇸	𝇹	𝇺	𝇻	𝇼	𝇽	𝇾	𝇿
Notes 1.As of Unicode version 18.0

== History ==
The following Unicode-related documents record the purpose and process of defining specific characters in the Musical Symbols block:

Version	Final code points (Note: Proposed code points and characters names may differ from final code points and names)	Count	L2 ID	WG2 ID	Document
3.1	U+1D100..1D126, 1D12A..1D1DD	219	L2/97-129		Roland, Perry (1996-12-03), Proposal for encoding Western music symbols in ISO/IEC 10646
3.1	U+1D100..1D126, 1D12A..1D1DD	219	L2/97-264		Aliprand, Joan (1997-11-25), Comments on Proposal for Encoding Western Music Symbols
3.1	U+1D100..1D126, 1D12A..1D1DD	219		N1693	Roland, Perry (1998-02-19), Proposal for encoding Western Music symbols
3.1	U+1D100..1D126, 1D12A..1D1DD	219	L2/98-045		Roland, Perry (1998-02-23), Proposal for Encoding Western Music Symbols in ISO/IEC 10646
3.1	U+1D100..1D126, 1D12A..1D1DD	219	L2/98-039		Aliprand, Joan; Winkler, Arnold (1998-02-24), "3.A.1 REVISED PROPOSAL a. Western Music", Preliminary Minutes - UTC #74 & L2 #171, Mountain View, CA - December 5, 1997
3.1	U+1D100..1D126, 1D12A..1D1DD	219	L2/98-070		Aliprand, Joan; Winkler, Arnold, "Western Music", Minutes of the joint UTC and L2 meeting from the meeting in Cupertino, February 25-27, 1998
3.1	U+1D100..1D126, 1D12A..1D1DD	219	L2/98-286	N1703	Umamaheswaran, V. S.; Ksar, Mike (1998-07-02), "8.21", Unconfirmed Meeting Minutes, WG 2 Meeting #34, Redmond, WA, USA; 1998-03-16--20
3.1	U+1D100..1D126, 1D12A..1D1DD	219	L2/99-392		Hodgson, Andrew (1999-12-24), Comments on the Proposal for Encoding Western Music Symbols in ISO/IEC 10646
3.1	U+1D100..1D126, 1D12A..1D1DD	219	L2/00-179		Everson, Michael (2000-06-08), Draft Irish comments to FCD 10646-2:2000 (Musical symbols chart)
3.1	U+1D100..1D126, 1D12A..1D1DD	219		N2280	Suignard, Michel (2000-09-22), "Clause 10 Western musical symbols (Two identically named sectins: One under Ireland, one under Sweden)", Disposition of comments on SC2 N 3442 (ISO/IEC FCD 10646-2)
3.1	U+1D100..1D126, 1D12A..1D1DD	219	L2/04-258		Cline, Ernest (2004-04-17), Musical symbol errors
3.1	U+1D100..1D126, 1D12A..1D1DD	219	L2/04-316		Moore, Lisa (2004-08-19), "B.15.14", UTC #100 Minutes
5.1	U+1D129	1	L2/05-258	N2983	Andries, Patrick (2005-09-07), Defect report and proposal to add one musical multiple rest character
5.1	U+1D129	1	L2/05-270		Whistler, Ken (2005-09-21), "H. Musical symbol", WG2 Consent Docket (Sophia Antipolis)
5.1	U+1D129	1	L2/05-279		Moore, Lisa (2005-11-10), "C.10", UTC #105 Minutes
5.1	U+1D129	1		N2953 (pdf, doc)	Umamaheswaran, V. S. (2006-02-16), "11.3", Unconfirmed minutes of WG 2 meeting 47, Sophia Antipolis, France; 2005-09-12/15
8.0	U+1D1DE..1D1E8	11	L2/11-376		Andreev, Aleksandr; Shardt, Yuri; Simmons, Nikita (2011-09-29), Proposal to Encode Medieval East-Slavic Musical Notation in Unicode
8.0	U+1D1DE..1D1E8	11	L2/12-022	N4206	Andreev, Aleksandr; Shardt, Yuri; Simmons, Nikita (2011-09-29), Proposal to Encode Medieval East-Slavic Musical Notation
8.0	U+1D1DE..1D1E8	11	L2/12-122		Andreev, Aleksandr; Shardt, Yuri; Simmons, Nikita (2012-04-23), Proposal to Encode Medieval East-Slavic Musical Notation in Unicode
8.0	U+1D1DE..1D1E8	11	L2/12-327	N4362	Andreev, Aleksandr; Shardt, Yuri; Simmons, Nikita (2012-10-04), Proposal to Encode Medieval East-Slavic Musical Notation
8.0	U+1D1DE..1D1E8	11	L2/12-343R2		Moore, Lisa (2012-12-04), "Consensus 133-C15", UTC #133 Minutes, "Approve 11 East-Slavic musical symbols"
8.0	U+1D1DE..1D1E8	11		N4353 (pdf, doc)	"M60.14", Unconfirmed minutes of WG 2 meeting 60, 2013-05-23
14.0	U+1D1E9..1D1EA	2	L2/20-159		Pournader, Roozbeh (2020-04-23), Proposal to encode two accidentals for Iranian classical music
14.0	U+1D1E9..1D1EA	2	L2/20-169		Anderson, Deborah; Whistler, Ken; Pournader, Roozbeh; Moore, Lisa; Constable, Peter; Liang, Hai (2020-07-21), "27. Music Symbols", Recommendations to UTC #164 July 2020 on Script Proposals
14.0	U+1D1E9..1D1EA	2	L2/20-172		Moore, Lisa (2020-08-03), "Consensus 164-C17", UTC #164 Minutes
18.0	U+1D127..1D128, 1D1FF	3	L2/23-278R		Bala, Gavin Jared; Miller, Kirk (2024-01-05), Unicode request for three musical symbols
18.0	U+1D127..1D128, 1D1FF	3	L2/24-013R		Anderson, Deborah; Goregaokar, Manish; Kučera, Jan; Whistler, Ken; Pournader, Roozbeh; Constable, Peter (2024-01-22), "14. Three musical symbols", Recommendations to UTC #178 January 2024 on Script Proposals
18.0	U+1D127..1D128, 1D1FF	3	L2/24-006		Constable, Peter (2024-01-31), "Consensus 178-C36", UTC #178 Minutes, "Provisionally assign the following 3 musical symbol characters ..."
18.0	U+1D127..1D128, 1D1FF	3	L2/25-226		"Consensus 185-C40", UTC #185 Minutes, 2025-10-29, "UTC accepts for encoding in Unicode 18.0 ..."
18.0	U+1D1EB..1D1F6	12	L2/23-276		Bala, Gavin Jared; Miller, Kirk (2023-11-19), Unicode request for Stein-Zimmermann quarter-tone accidentals
18.0	U+1D1EB..1D1F6	12	L2/24-013R		Anderson, Deborah; Goregaokar, Manish; Kučera, Jan; Whistler, Ken; Pournader, Roozbeh; Constable, Peter (2024-01-22), "15. Unicode request for Stein-Zimmermann quarter-tone accidentals", Recommendations to UTC #178 January 2024 on Script Proposals
18.0	U+1D1EB..1D1F6	12	L2/24-006		Constable, Peter (2024-01-31), "Consensus 178-C37", UTC #178 Minutes, "Provisionally assign 12 musical symbols for Stein-Zimmermann quarter-tone accidentals ..."
18.0	U+1D1EB..1D1F6	12	L2/25-226		"Consensus 185-C40", UTC #185 Minutes, 2025-10-29, "UTC accepts for encoding in Unicode 18.0 ..."
18.0	U+1D1F7..1D1FE	8	L2/23-277		Bala, Gavin Jared; Miller, Kirk (2023-11-19), Unicode request for digits with slashes used in figured bass
18.0	U+1D1F7..1D1FE	8	L2/24-013R		Anderson, Deborah; Goregaokar, Manish; Kučera, Jan; Whistler, Ken; Pournader, Roozbeh; Constable, Peter (2024-01-22), "10. Numbers with slashes used in figured bass", Recommendations to UTC #178 January 2024 on Script Proposals
18.0	U+1D1F7..1D1FE	8	L2/24-006		Constable, Peter (2024-01-31), "Consensus 178-C31:Provisionally assign ...", UTC #178 Minutes
18.0	U+1D1F7..1D1FE	8	L2/24-166		Anderson, Deborah; Goregaokar, Manish; Kučera, Jan; Whistler, Ken; Pournader, Roozbeh; Constable, Peter (2024-07-18), "17. Numbers with slashes used in figured bass", Recommendations to UTC #180 July 2024 on Script Proposals
18.0	U+1D1F7..1D1FE	8	L2/24-159		Constable, Peter (2024-07-29), "Consensus 180-C38", UTC #180 Minutes, "Change the name [...] to replace the word "SLASH" with "STROKE""
18.0	U+1D1F7..1D1FE	8	L2/25-226		"Consensus 185-C40", UTC #185 Minutes, 2025-10-29, "UTC accepts for encoding in Unicode 18.0 ..."

== See also ==
- Ancient Greek Musical Notation (Unicode block)
- Byzantine Musical Symbols (Unicode block)
- Musical Symbols Supplement
- Znamenny Musical Notation (Unicode block)
- List of musical symbols
