= Millisecond =

One thousandth of a second

millisecond
- Unit system: SI
- Unit of: time
- Symbol: ms

Conversions
1 ms in ...	... is equal to ...
- SI units: 0.001 s

A millisecond (from milli- and second; symbol: ms) is a unit of time in the International System of Units equal to one thousandth (0.001 or 10^{−3} or ^{1}/_{1000}) of a second or 1000 microseconds.

A millisecond is to one second, as one second is to approximately 16.67 minutes.

A unit of 10 milliseconds may be called a centisecond, and one of 100 milliseconds a decisecond, but these names are rarely used. To help compare orders of magnitude of different times, this page lists times between 10^{−3} seconds and 10^{0} seconds (1 millisecond and one second). See also times of other orders of magnitude.

Horizontal logarithmic scale marked with units of time

== Examples ==
- 1 millisecond (1 ms) – cycle time for frequency 1 kHz; duration of light for typical photo flash strobe; time taken for sound wave to travel about 34 cm; repetition interval of GPS C/A PN code
- 1 millisecond – time taken for light to travel 204.19 km in a single mode fiber optic cable for a wavelength of 1550 nm (frequency: 193 THz).
- 1 millisecond – nerve conduction velocity (neuron signal firing) happens on the order of milliseconds
- 1.000692286 milliseconds – time taken for light to travel 300 km in a vacuum
- 1 to 5 milliseconds – typical response time in LCD computer monitors, especially high-end displays
- 2 milliseconds – Shift time for a modern Formula One car using a seamless-shift semi-automatic sequential transmission
- 2.27 milliseconds – cycle time for pitch A440, the most commonly used pitch for tuning musical instruments
- 3 milliseconds – a housefly's wing flap
- 3.3 milliseconds – normal delay time between initiation and detonation of a C4 explosive charge
- 4 milliseconds – typical average seek time for a 10,000 rpm hard disk
- 5 milliseconds – a honey bee's wing flap
- 5 milliseconds to 80 milliseconds – a hummingbird's wing flap
- 8 milliseconds – 1/125 of a second, a standard camera shutter speed (125); fastest shifting time of a car's mechanical transmission
- 10 milliseconds (10 ms) – a jiffy, cycle time for frequency 100 Hz
- 10.378 milliseconds – rotation period of pulsar B1639+36A
- 15.625 milliseconds – a two hundred fifty-sixth note at 60 BPM
- 16.67 milliseconds (1/60 second) – a third, cycle time for American 60 Hz AC electricity (mains grid)
- 16.68 milliseconds (1/59.94 second) – the amount of time one field lasts in 29.97 fps interlaced video (commonly erroneously referred to as 30 fps)
- 20 milliseconds – cycle time for European 50 Hz AC electricity
- 31.25 milliseconds – a hundred twenty-eighth note at 60 BPM
- 33.367 milliseconds – the amount of time one frame lasts in 29.97 fps video (most common for NTSC-legacy formats)
- 41.667 milliseconds – the amount of time one frame lasts in 24 fps video (most common cinematic frame rate)
- 41.708 milliseconds – the amount of time one frame lasts in 23.976 fps video (cinematic frame rate for NTSC-legacy formats)
- 50 milliseconds – the time interval between gear changes on a Lamborghini Aventador; with a 7-speed single-clutch automated manual transmission
- 50 milliseconds – cycle time for the lowest audible tone, 20 Hz
- 60 milliseconds – cycle time for European 16.7 Hz AC electrified railroad power grid
- 60 milliseconds – the time interval between gear changes on a Ferrari 458 Spider; with a 7-speed dual-clutch automatic transmission
- 62.5 milliseconds – a sixty-fourth note at 60 BPM
- 5 to 80 milliseconds – typical latency for a broadband internet connection (important for playing online games)
- 100 milliseconds – the time interval between gear changes on a Ferrari FXX; with a 6-speed single-clutch automated manual transmission
- 125 milliseconds – a thirty-second note at 60 BPM
- 134 milliseconds – time taken by light to travel around the Earth's equator
- 150 milliseconds – recommended maximum time delay for telephone service
- 100–400 milliseconds – the time for the human eye to blink
- 185 milliseconds – the duration of a full rotation of the main rotor on Bell 205, 212, and 412 helicopters (normal rotor speed is 324 RPM)
- 200 milliseconds – the time it takes the human brain to recognize emotion in facial expressions
- 250 milliseconds – a sixteenth note at 60 BPM
- 400 milliseconds – time in which the fastest baseball pitches reach the strike zone
- 430 to 500 milliseconds – common modern dance music tempos (120–140 BPM)
- 495 milliseconds – an approximate average of the round trip time for communications via geosynchronous satellites
- 500 milliseconds – an eighth note at 60 BPM
- 770 milliseconds – revolution period of a 78 rpm record
- 860 milliseconds – average human resting heart cycle time
- 1000 milliseconds – one second; the period of a 1 Hz oscillator
- 86,400,000 (24 × 60 × 60 × 1000) milliseconds – one day
- 604,800,000 (24 × 60 × 60 × 1000 × 7) milliseconds – one week
- 31,556,925,974.7 (86,400,000 × approximately 365.242) milliseconds – one year
- 31,556,908,800... or (31,556,925,974.7 × approximately 10) milliseconds – one decade

== See also ==
- International System of Units
- Second
- Microsecond
- Nanosecond
- Picosecond
- Femtosecond
- Attosecond
