= Note value =

Sign that indicates the relative duration of a note

Parts of a note symbol

In music notation, a note value indicates the relative duration of a note, using the texture or shape of the notehead, the presence or absence of a stem, and the presence or absence of flags/beams/hooks/tails. Unmodified note values are fractional powers of two, for example one, one-half, one fourth, etc.

A rest indicates a silence of an equivalent duration.

== List ==
Note	Rest	American name	British name	Relative value	Dotted value	Double dotted value	Triple dotted value
		large, duplex longa, or maxima (occasionally octuple note, octuple whole note, or octuple entire musical note)		8	8 + 4 = 12	8 + 4 + 2 = 14	8 + 4 + 2 + 1 = 15
		long or longa (occasionally quadruple note or quadruple whole note)		4	4 + 2 = 6	4 + 2 + 1 = 7	4 + 2 + 1 + 1/2 = 7 1/2
		double whole note, double note	breve	2	2 + 1 = 3	2 + 1 + 1/2 = 3 1/2	2 + 1 + 1/2 + 1/4 = 3 3/4
		whole note	semibreve	1	1 + 1/2 = 1 1/2	1 + 1/2 + 1/4 = 1 3/4	1 + 1/2 + 1/4 + 1/8 = 1 7/8
		half note	minim	1/2	1/2 + 1/4 = 3/4	1/2 + 1/4 + 1/8 = 7/8	1/2 + 1/4 + 1/8 + 1/16 = 15/16
	or	quarter note	crotchet; semiminim	1/4	1/4 + 1/8 = 3/8	1/4 + 1/8 + 1/16 = 7/16	1/4 + 1/8 + 1/16 + 1/32 = 15/32
		eighth note	quaver	1/8	1/8 + 1/16 = 3/16	1/8 + 1/16 + 1/32 = 7/32	1/8 + 1/16 + 1/32 + 1/64 = 15/64
		sixteenth note	semiquaver	1/16	1/16 + 1/32 = 3/32	1/16 + 1/32 + 1/64 = 7/64	1/16 + 1/32 + 1/64 + 1/128 = 15/128
		thirty-second note	demisemiquaver	1/32	1/32 + 1/64 = 3/64	1/32 + 1/64 + 1/128 = 7/128	1/32 + 1/64 + 1/128 + 1/256 = 15/256
		sixty-fourth note	hemidemisemiquaver	1/64	1/64 + 1/128 = 3/128	1/64 + 1/128 + 1/256 = 7/256	1/64 + 1/128 + 1/256 + 1/512 = 15/512
		hundred twenty-eighth note	semihemidemisemiquaver (rare)	1/128	1/128 + 1/256 = 3/256	1/128 + 1/256 + 1/512 = 7/512	1/128 + 1/256 + 1/512 + 1/1024 = 15/1024
		two hundred fifty-sixth note	demisemihemidemisemiquaver (rare)	1/256	1/256 + 1/512 = 3/512	1/256 + 1/512 + 1/1024 = 7/1024	1/256 + 1/512 + 1/1024 + 1/2048 = 15/2048

Shorter notes can be created theoretically ad infinitum by adding further flags, but are very rare.

== Variations ==
Variants of the breve. The first two are commonly used; the third is a stylistic alternative.

The breve appears in several different versions.

Sometimes the longa or breve is used to indicate a very long note of indefinite duration, as at the end of a piece (e.g. at the end of Mozart's Mass KV 192).

A single eighth note, or any faster note, is always stemmed with flags, while two or more are usually beamed in groups. When a stem is present, it can go either up (from the right side of the note head) or down (from the left side), except in the cases of the longa or maxima which are nearly always written with downward stems. In most cases, the stem goes down if the notehead is on the center line or above, and up otherwise. Any flags always go to the right of the stem.

Beamed notes

== Modifiers ==
A note value may be augmented by adding a dot after it. This dot adds the next briefer note value, making it one and a half times its original duration. A number of dots (n) lengthen the note value by (2^{n} − 1)/2^{n} its value, so two dots add two lower note values, making a total of one and three quarters times its original duration. The rare three dots make it one and seven eighths the duration, and so on.

The double dot was first used in 1752 by J. J. Quantz; in music of the 18th century and earlier the amount by which the dot augmented the note varied: it could be more or less than the modern interpretation, to fit into the context.

The vertical double dot was introduced by Willi Apel and is sometimes used in modern transcriptions of medieval and renaissance music written in mensural notation. It is used to write a note worth nine beats filling a full bar in 9/8 or 9/4 meter. The second dot lengthens an already dotted note by half once more. thus, a dotted half note (minim) consisting of 6 quarter notes becomes 9 quarter notes. Without this device, such a value would require writing a dotted half note tied to a dotted quarter note.

To divide a note value to three equal parts, or some other value than two, tuplets may be used. However, see swung note and notes inégales.

== History ==
=== Gregorian chant ===
Although note heads of various shapes, and notes with and without stems appear in early Gregorian chant manuscripts, many scholars agree that these symbols do not indicate different durations, although the dot is used for augmentation. See neume.

In the 13th century, chant was sometimes performed according to rhythmic modes, roughly equivalent to meters; however, the note shapes still did not indicate duration in the same way as modern note values.

=== Mensural notation ===
Around 1250, Franco of Cologne invented different symbols for different durations, although the relation between different note values could vary; three was the most common ratio. Philippe de Vitry's treatise Ars nova (1320) described a system in which the ratios of different note values could be 2:1 or 3:1, with a system of mensural time signatures to distinguish between them.

This black mensural notation gave way to white mensural notation around 1450, in which all note values were written with white (outline) noteheads. In white notation the use of triplets was indicated by coloration, i.e. filling in the noteheads to make them black (or sometimes red). Both black and white notation periodically made use of ligatures, a holdover from the clivis and porrectus neumes used in chant.

Around 1600 the modern notational system was generally adopted, along with barlines and the practice of writing multipart music in scores rather than only individual parts. In the 17th century, however, old usages came up occasionally.

== Origins of the names ==
The British names go back at least to English renaissance music, and the terms of Latin origin had international currency at that time. Longa means 'long', and many of the rest indicate relative shortness. Breve is from Latin brevis, 'short', minim is from minimus, 'very small', and quaver refers to the quavering effect of very fast notes. The elements semi-, demi- and hemi- mean 'half' in Latin, French and Greek respectively. The chain semantic shift whereby notes which were originally perceived as short came progressively to be long notes is interesting both linguistically and musically. However, the crotchet is named after the shape of the note, from the Old French for a 'little hook', and it is possible to argue that the same is true of the minim, since the word is also used in palaeography to mean a vertical stroke in mediaeval handwriting.
