= Tie (music) =

Musical notation

A quarter note tied to a sixteenth note

Dotted note notation and the equivalent durations in tied note notation.

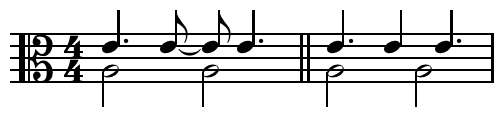
Tie across the beat, followed by identical rhythm notated without tie

In music notation, a tie is a curved line connecting the heads of two or more notes of the same pitch, indicating that they are to be played as a single note with a duration equal to the sum of the individual notes' values. A tie is similar in appearance to a slur; however, slurs join notes of different pitches which need to be played independently, but seamlessly (legato).

Ties are used for three reasons: (a) when holding a note across a bar line; (b) when holding a note across a beat within a bar, i.e. to allow the beat to be clearly seen; and (c) for unusual note lengths which cannot be expressed in standard notation.

== Explanation ==
A tie is a curved line above or below two notes of the same pitch, which indicates that they are to be performed like one note equal in length to the two.

A writer in 1901, said that the following definition is preferable to the previous:

A tie is a curved line connecting two notes of the same pitch, to show that the second is a continuation of the first.

Other sources:

Ties...are a notational device used to show the prolongation of a note into succeeding beats, as opposed to a repetition of a note. ... Our modern tie-mark, first systematically used in the early sixteenth century [Baroque music], is a curved line that connects the two successive note-heads indicating, together, the total time value desired. ... Ties are normally employed to join the time-value of two notes of identical pitch.

The tie is a curved line that connects two adjacent notes of the same pitch into a single sound with a duration equal to the sum of both note values.

The duration of a note can be prolonged...using a tie to the one note over to another of the same pitch....A tie adds to the time value of the first note the value of the succeeding note or notes that are paired together by the tie or ties.

A tie is a curved line connecting two notes of the same pitch, thereby creating a durational value equal to the sum of the values of the two notes. This is necessary when a note is to be sustained over a bar line, and under certain conditions, within the same measure. (Note: to indicate beat grouping, the example given is ._{_{˘}} in 4/4)

Ties are normally placed opposite the stem direction of the notes, unless there are two or more voices simultaneously.

The tie shown at the top right connects a quarter note (crotchet) to a sixteenth note (semiquaver), creating a note 5/4 as long as a quarter note, or five times as long as a sixteenth note—there is no single note value to express this duration. However, in some cases one might tie two notes that could be written with a single note value, such as a quarter note tied to an eighth note (the same length as a dotted quarter). This might be because:

- A barline is between the notes

- The second note begins a metric grouping, falling on a stressed beat of the meter. This change in notation (choosing the tie rather than the longer note value) does not affect performance, but it makes the music easier to read. Sometimes it can be used to make it clear that it has the appropriate rhythm. For example, a 6/8 measure with three equal notes would have a quarter note on each side but two tied eighth notes in the middle; a 3/4 measure with three equal notes would have all quarter notes.

Several notes in succession can be tied together. Such a succession can also be part of a larger, slurred phrase, in which case, ties and slurs must be used simultaneously and distinguishably.

When a chord is tied, a tie is drawn for every note in the chord. Where only some of the notes in a chord are to be held, a tie can be used on only the held notes (more commonly the held notes can be moved to a different voice; the second and third examples below are identical).

== History ==
The tie first appeared in 1523 in the Recerchari, motetti, canzoni by Marco Antonio Cavazzoni. The tie was used to show the duration of differing harmonies on early figured basses to show how they should be sounded over the held bass note. Many early pianists, like Beethoven, used the tie in many pieces to show the demand of gentle reiteration.
