= Semifusa =

In music, semifusa may refer to two distinct note values:

- a value in mensural notation corresponding to the modern sixteenth note
- the modern Spanish word for a sixty-fourth note
