= Dotted note =

Musical note duration

Dotted notes and their equivalent durations. The curved lines, called ties, add the note values together.

In Western musical notation, a dotted note is a note with a small dot written after it. (Note: For dots placed above or below notes, see Staccato and Portato.) In modern practice, the dot increases the duration of the original note by half of its value. This makes a dotted note equivalent to the original note tied to a note of half the value – for example, a dotted half note is equivalent to a half note tied to a quarter note. Subsequent dots add progressively halved value, as shown in the example to the right. (Note: If the base note is 1, then the xth dot adds $1/2^x$ the length (1/2, 1/4, 1/8, ...).)

The use of dotted notes dates back at least to the 10th century, but the exact amount of lengthening a dot provides in early music contexts may vary. Mensural notation uses a dot of division to clarify ambiguities about its context-dependent interpretation of rhythmic values, sometimes alongside the dot of augmentation as described above. In the gregorian chant editions of Solesmes, a dot is typically interpreted as a doubling of length (see also Neume).

Historical examples of music performance practices using unequal rhythms include notes inégales and swing. The precise performance of dotted rhythms can be a complex issue. Even in notation that employs dots, their performed values may be longer or shorter than the dot mathematically indicates, practices known as over-dotting or under-dotting.

== Notation ==
If a dotted note is on a space, the dot is placed in that space (a). If the note is on a line, the dot is placed in the space above (b). This principle also applies to notes on ledger lines.

When there are adjacent dotted notes (such as in a chord or in multiple voices) space may not allow for the dots to be placed according to this convention. When there is not room for the correct amount of dots, fewer dots may be shown (c), and simultaneous dotted notes on lines may show the dot on the lower in the space below (d).

Any note value can be dotted, as can rests of any value. If the rest is in its normal vertical position near the middle of the staff, dots are placed in the third staff space. Dotted rests are conventional in compound meters but can sometimes be used in simple meters as well.

In Baroque music, dotted notation was sometimes used to indicate triplet rhythms when the context makes it obvious.

Dots have been used across barlines, such as in H. C. Robbins Landon's edition of Joseph Haydn's Symphony No. 70 in D major, but this usage is obsolete—a tie across the barline is used instead.

== Double dotting ==
Incipit of the second movement of Haydn's String Quartet, Op. 74, No. 2. The first note is double-dotted.

A double-dotted note is a note with two small dots written after it, with a duration of 1 3/4 times its basic note value. Double-dotted notes are much less common than single dotted notes. Typically, as in the example to the right, they are followed by a note whose duration is one-quarter the length of the basic note value, completing the next higher note value. Double dots were not used until the mid-18th century, before which a single dot could sometimes mean a double dot.

In a French overture (and sometimes other Baroque music), notes written as single dotted notes are often interpreted to mean double-dotted notes, and the following note is commensurately shortened (see Historically informed performance).

== Beyond two dots ==
0 dots1 dot2 dots3 dots

Triple dotted notes are very uncommon, and quadruple dotted notes are extremely rare. Triple-dotted notes are found in the music of Richard Wagner and Anton Bruckner, especially in brass parts. Their duration is 1 7/8 times the basic note value.

Triple-dotted notes also appear in Frédéric Chopin's Prelude in G major for piano, Op. 28, No. 3. The piece, in common time (4/4), contains running semiquavers (sixteenth notes) in the left hand. Several times during the piece the right hand plays a triple-dotted minim (half note), lasting 15 semiquavers, simultaneously with the first left-hand semiquaver, then one semiquaver simultaneously with the last left-hand semiquaver.

Quadruple-dotted notes, with a duration of 1 15/16 times its basic note value, are extremely rare. A quintuple dotted note would be 1 31/32 times the original note's value. (Note: Tempos vary from ≤24 beats per minute to ≥200 bpm; at a slow larghetto tempo of quarter note = 60 (one quarter note per second; 60 bpm), the length of a quintuple dotted note is 0.03125 seconds longer than a quadruple dotted note and presumably below the just-noticeable difference for musical duration and too fast to allow proper counting and accuracy.) This becomes impractical due to the increasingly small gradation of the length of such a note (notes shorter than sixty-fourth notes are rare and at the limits of what is practical) and the fact that multiple dots obscure any intermediate divisions of the beat, making the rhythm more difficult to read.

Base note duration = 1
	Undotted	1 dot	2 dots	3 dots	4 dots
Lengthens	N/A ($0$)	1/2 $= 0.5$	1/4 $= 0.25$	1/8 $= 0.125$	1/16 $= 0.0625$
Decimal result	$1$	$1.5$	$1.75$	$1.875$	$1.9375$
Fractional result	$1$	$1$1/2	$1$3/4	$1$7/8	$1$15/16

== See also ==
- Dotted rest
- Tuplet

== Notes and references ==
Notes

Sources

- Read, Gardner (1969). Music Notation: A Manual of Modern Practice (2nd ed.). Boston: Allyn & Bacon. ISBN 978-0800854539.
