= Augmentation (music) =

Musical technique

In Western music and music theory, augmentation (from Late Latin augmentare, to increase) is the lengthening of a note or the widening of an interval.

Augmentation is a compositional device where a melody, theme or motif is presented in longer note-values than were previously used. Augmentation is also the term for the proportional lengthening of the value of individual note-shapes in older notation by coloration, by use of a sign of proportion, or by a notational symbol such as the modern dot. A major or perfect interval that is widened by a chromatic semitone is an augmented interval, and the process may be called augmentation.

== Augmentation in composition ==
A melody or series of notes is augmented if the lengths of the notes are prolonged; augmentation is thus the opposite of diminution, where note values are shortened. A melody originally consisting of four quavers (eighth notes) for example, is augmented if it later appears with four crotchets (quarter notes) instead. This technique is often used in contrapuntal music, as in the "canon by augmentation" ("per augmentationem"), in which the notes in the following voice or voices are longer than those in the leading voice, usually twice the original length. The music of Johann Sebastian Bach provides examples of this application:

Bach, Vom Himmel Hoch canonic variations, BWV 769, Variation 5

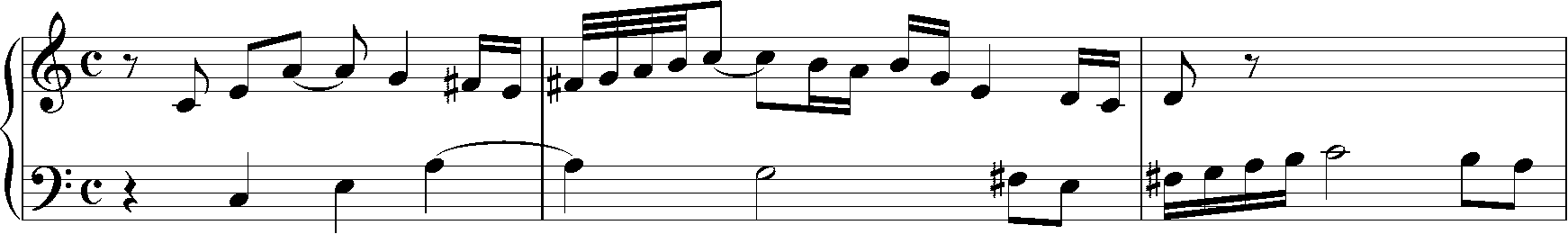
Bach, Vom Himmel Hoch canonic variations, BWV 769, Variation 5

Other ratios of augmentation, such as 1:3 (tripled note values) and 1:4 (quadrupled note values), are also possible. A motif is also augmented through expanding its duration.

Augmentation may also be found in later, non-contrapuntal pieces, such as the Pastoral Symphony (Symphony No. 6) of Beethoven, where the melodic figure first heard in the second violins at the start of the "Storm" movement ("Die Sturm"):

Beethoven Symphony No 6, fourth movement, bars 3-8

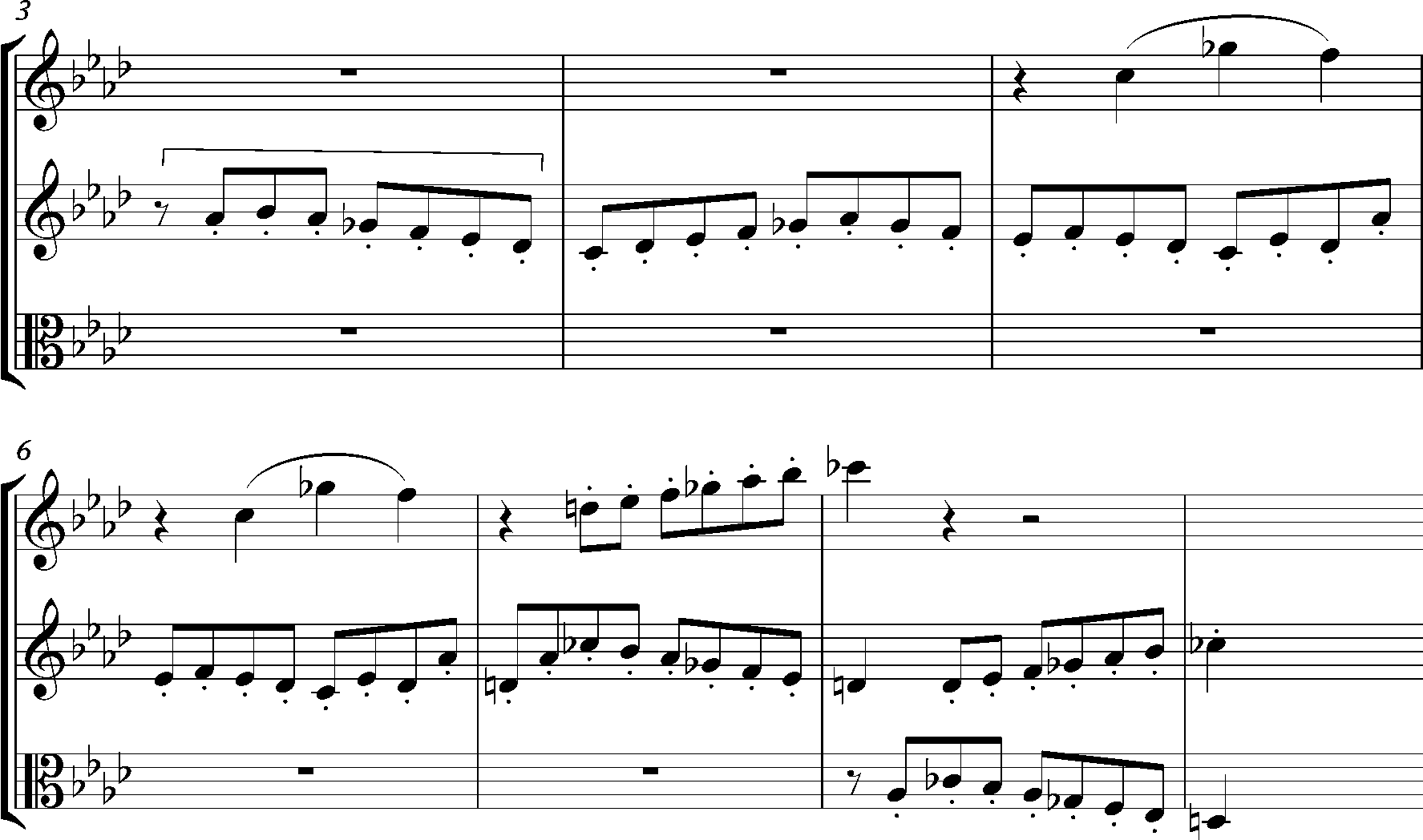
Beethoven Symphony No 6, fourth movement, bars 3–8

is heard again in an augmented and transposed version in the same movement’s closing ten bars:

Beethoven Symphony No 6, fourth movement, bars 146-155

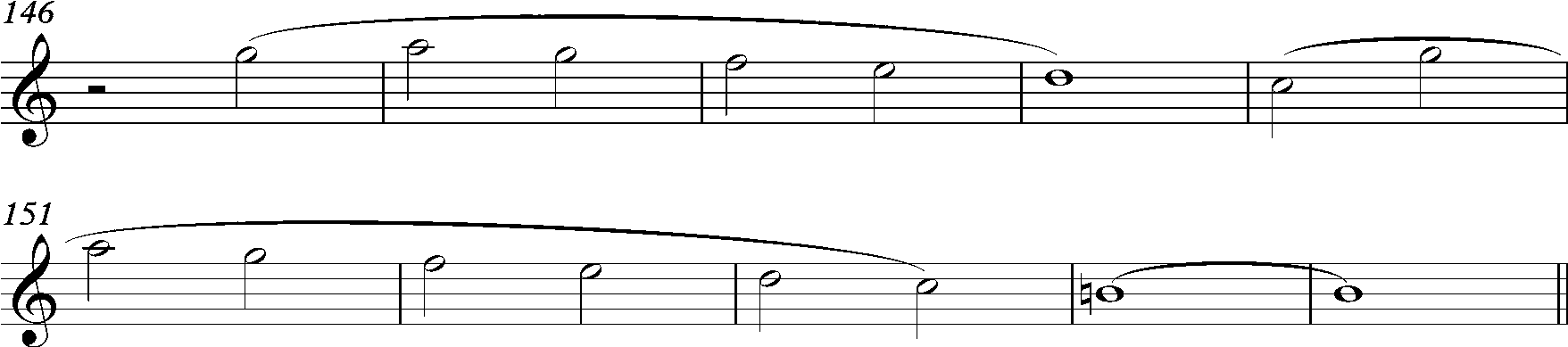
Beethoven Symphony No 6, fourth movement, bars 146–155

Examples of augmentation may be found in the development sections of sonata form movements, particularly in the symphonies of Brahms and Bruckner and in the protean leitmotifs in Wagner’s operas, which undergo all kinds of transformation as the characters change and develop through the unfolding drama. "Leitmotifs accumulate meaning, through expanding and fulfilling their musical potential."

In “Doctor Gradus ad Parnassum”, the first movement of his Children’s Corner Suite, Debussy exploits augmentation in a humorous vein. It opens with a vigorous parody of a technical study by a pedagogical composer such as Clementi, involving a seemingly perpetual stream of fast semiquavers:

Debussy, "Dr Gradus" from Children's Corner, bars 1-3

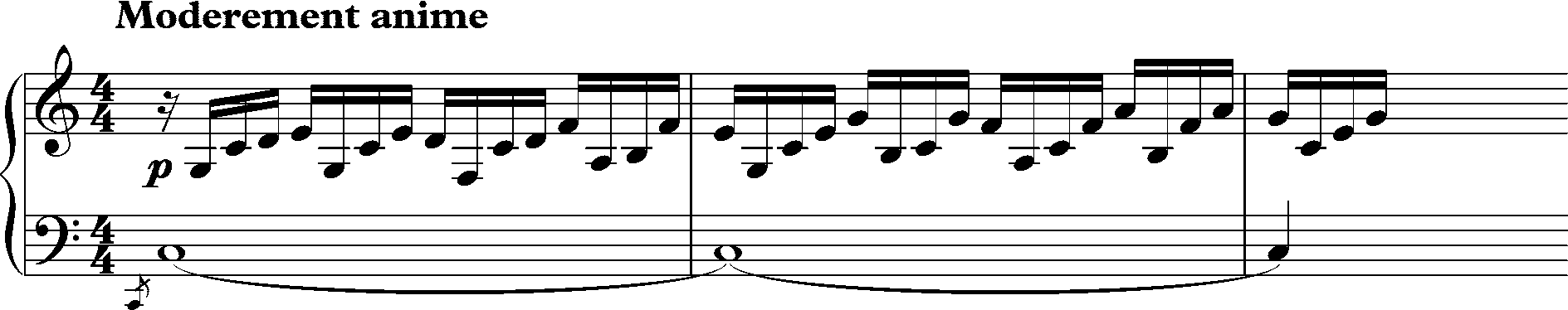
Debussy, "Dr Gradus" from Children's Corner, bars 1–3

In bar 33, this energetic movement subsides, leading to a dreamy passage in the key of D flat, where the opening figures of the piece move at half speed:

Debussy, "Dr Gradus" from Children's Corner, bars 36-43

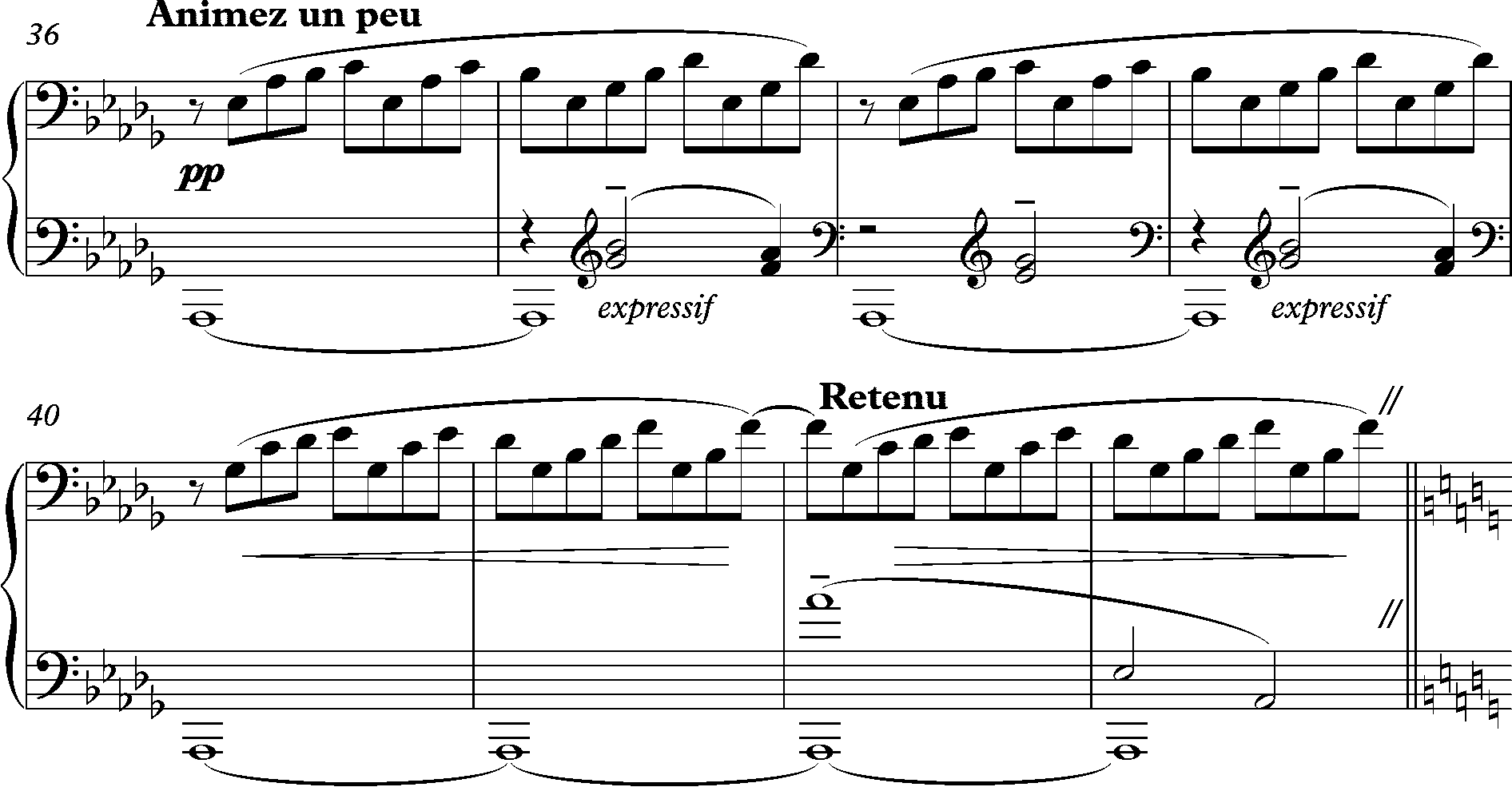
Debussy, "Dr Gradus" from Children's Corner, bars 36–43

According to Frank Dawes, in this piece “An amusing picture of a child practising is conjured up, beginning with the best of intentions, growing weary and plainly yawning with boredom in the D flat section.” Listen.

== Augmentation in notation ==
Dotted notes and their equivalent durations. The curved lines, called ties, add the note values together.

== Augmentation of intervals ==
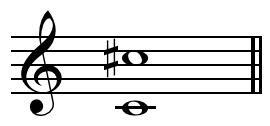
Augmented octave on C.

An augmented interval is an interval obtained from a major interval or perfect interval by widening it by a chromatic semitone, meaning that the interval is widened by a semitone, but the staff positions are not changed (only an accidental is changed). For example, an augmented third is a chromatic semitone wider than the major third: starting with the interval from A♭ to C, which is a major third, four semitones wide, the interval from A♭ to C♯ is an augmented third, spanning five semitones, but the same staff lines. By contrast, the interval from A♭ to D♭ is not an augmented third (it is a perfect fourth): even though it is four semitones wide, it spans four staff positions, and is thus a fourth, not a third; it is a diatonic semitone wider than a major third. The augmented fourth (A4) is the only augmented interval that appears in diatonic scales (in D♭ major it occurs between G♭ and C). The standard abbreviations for augmented intervals are AX, such that an augmented third = A3.

Augmented intervals on C
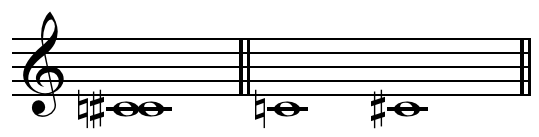
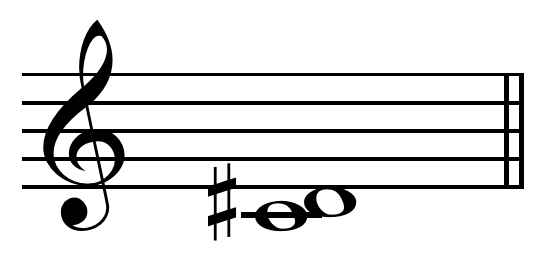
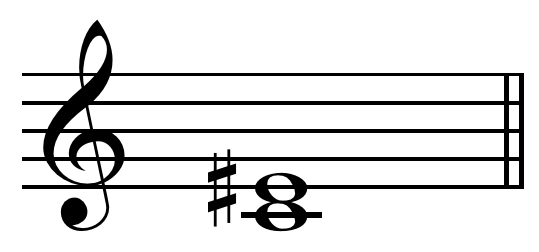
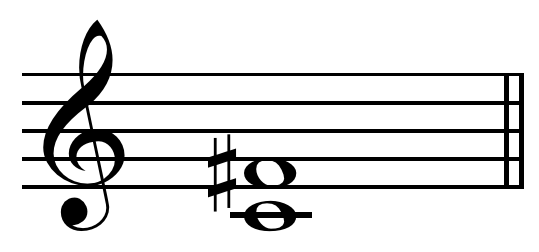
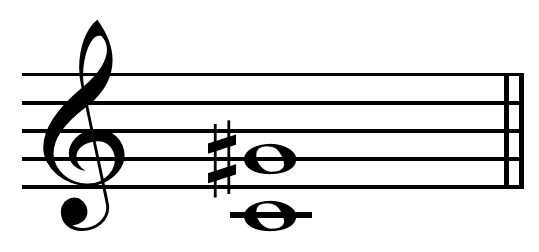
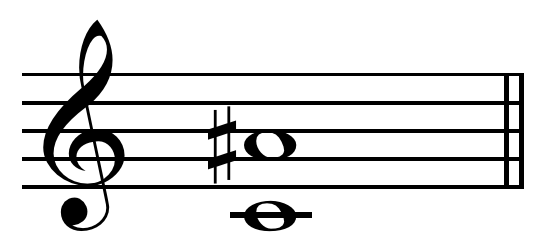
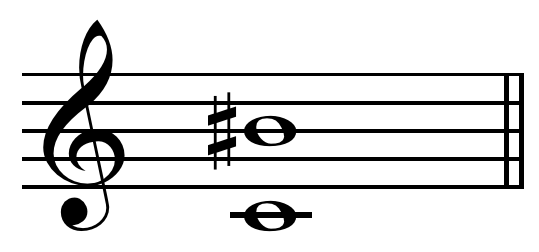
Augmented unison	Augmented second	Augmented third	Augmented fourth	Augmented fifth	Augmented sixth	Augmented seventh

A good example of this can be seen in the left hand part of Chopin's famous E minor prelude Op. 28, No. 4. Many of the chord sequences change with the top or bottom note augmenting or diminishing the next chord as the music progresses.

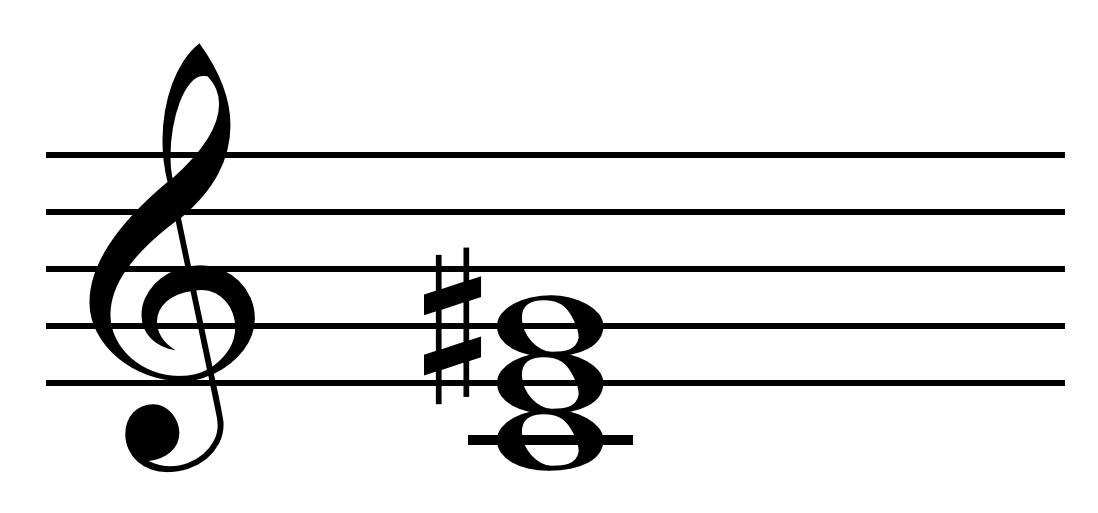
Augmented triad on C

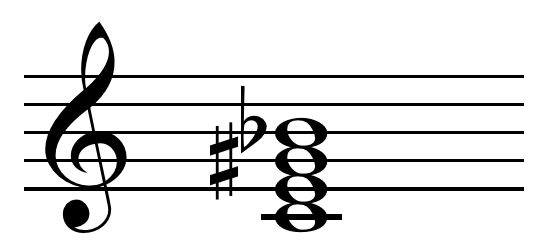
Augmented dominant seventh
chord on C

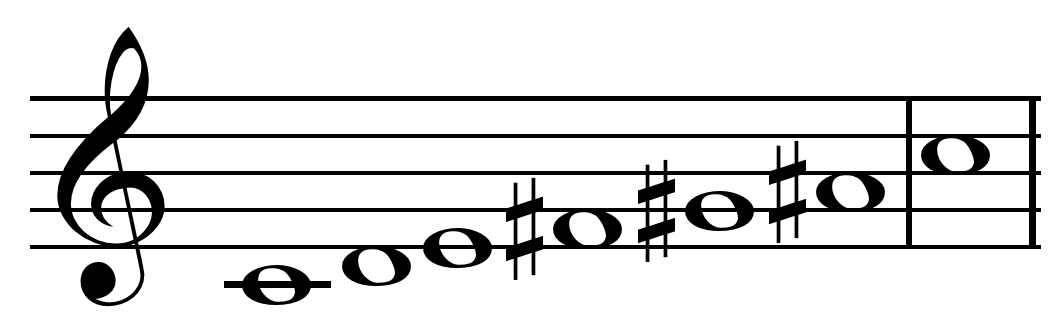
Whole tone scale on C.

An augmented chord is one which contains an augmented interval, almost invariably the 5th of the chord. An augmented triad is a major triad whose fifth has been raised by a chromatic semitone; it is the principal harmony of the whole tone scale. For example, the D♭ augmented triad contains the notes D♭—F—A.

== See also ==
- List of musical intervals
- List of pitch intervals
