= Tuplet =

Type of beat-subdividing rhythm in music

Rhythm with triplets: a triplet on the second beat and a quintuplet on the fourth

In music, a tuplet (also irrational rhythm or groupings, artificial division or groupings, abnormal divisions, irregular rhythm, gruppetto, extra-metric groupings, or, rarely, contrametric rhythm) is "any rhythm that involves dividing the beat into a different number of equal subdivisions from that usually permitted by the time-signature (e.g., triplets, duplets, etc.)" This is indicated by a number, or sometimes two indicating the fraction involved. The notes involved are also often grouped with a bracket or (in older notation) a slur.

The most common type of tuplet is the triplet.

== Terminology ==
The modern term 'tuplet' comes from a rebracketing of compound words like quintu(s)-(u)plet and sextu(s)-(u)plet, and from related mathematical terms such as "tuple", "-uplet" and "-plet", which are used to form terms denoting multiplets (Oxford English Dictionary, entries "multiplet", "-plet, comb. form", "-let, suffix", and "-et, suffix^{1}"). An alternative modern term, "irrational rhythm", was originally borrowed from Greek prosody where it referred to "a syllable having a metrical value not corresponding to its actual time-value, or ... a metrical foot containing such a syllable" (Oxford English Dictionary, entry "irrational"). The term would be incorrect if used in the mathematical sense (because the note-values are rational fractions) or in the more general sense of "unreasonable, utterly illogical, absurd".

Alternative terms found occasionally are "artificial division", "abnormal divisions", "irregular rhythm", and "irregular rhythmic groupings". The term "polyrhythm" (or "polymeter"), sometimes incorrectly used instead of "tuplets", actually refers to the simultaneous use of opposing time signatures.

Besides "triplet", the terms "duplet", "quadruplet", "quintuplet", "sextuplet", "septuplet", and "octuplet" are used frequently. The terms "nonuplet", "decuplet", "undecuplet", "dodecuplet", and "tredecuplet" had been suggested but up until 1925 had not caught on. By 1964 the terms "nonuplet" and "decuplet" were usual, while subdivisions by greater numbers were more commonly described as "group of eleven notes", "group of twelve notes", and so on.

== Triplet ==
The most common tuplet is the triplet (German Triole, French triolet, Italian terzina or tripletta, Spanish tresillo). Whereas normally two quarter notes (crotchets) are the same duration as a half note (minim), three triplet quarter notes have that same duration, so the duration of a triplet quarter note is 2/3 the duration of a standard quarter note.

Similarly, three triplet eighth notes (quavers) are equal in duration to one quarter note. If several note values appear under the triplet bracket, they are all affected the same way, reduced to 2/3 their original duration.

The triplet indication may also apply to notes of different values, for example a quarter note followed by one eighth note, in which case the quarter note may be regarded as two triplet eighths tied together.

In some older scores, rhythms like this would be notated as a dotted eighth note and a sixteenth note as a kind of shorthand presumably so that the beaming more clearly shows the beats.

== Tuplet notation ==
=== Notation ===
Three triplet quarter notes for example are expressed by quarter notes accompanied by typically either a bracket or with a number above or below the beam if the notes are beamed together. Much less commonly the tuplet is notated with a ratio (instead of just a number) — with the first number in the ratio indicating the number of notes in the tuplet and the second number indicating the number of normal notes they have the same duration as — or with a ratio and a note value. In the following examples, all 4 notations are valid. Either of the first two is almost always used.

However when tuplets are repeated regularly it is common to omit tuplet indicator completely. For example repeated triplet eighths are written just like beamed three eighths. In the example below all beamed chunks are understood to be triplets; otherwise it would contradict the time signature.

=== Rhythm ===
==== Simple meter ====
For other tuplets, the number indicates a ratio to the next lower normal value in the prevailing meter (a power of 2 in simple meter). So a quintuplet (quintolet or pentuplet) indicated with the numeral 5 means that five of the indicated note value total the duration normally occupied by four (or, as a division of a dotted note in compound time, three), equivalent to the second higher note value. For example, five quintuplet eighth notes total the same duration as a half note (or, in 3/8 or compound meters such as 6/8, 9/8, etc. time, a dotted quarter note).

Some numbers are used inconsistently: for example septuplets (septolets or septimoles) usually indicate 7 notes in the duration of 4—or in compound meter 7 for 6—but may sometimes be used to mean 7 notes in the duration of 8. Thus, a septuplet lasting a whole note can be written with either quarter notes (7:4) or eighth notes (7:8).

To avoid ambiguity, composers sometimes write the ratio explicitly instead of just a single number. This is also done for cases like 7:11, where the validity of this practice is established by the complexity of the figure. A French alternative is to write pour ("for") or de ("of") in place of the colon, or above the bracketed "irregular" number. This reflects the French usage of, for example, "six-pour-quatre" as an alternative name for the sextolet.

There are disagreements about the sextuplet (pronounced with stress on the first syllable, according to Baker)—which is also called sestole, sestolet, sextole, or sextolet. This six-part division may be regarded either as a triplet with each note divided in half (2 + 2 + 2)—therefore with an accent on the first, third, and fifth notes—or else as an ordinary duple pattern with each note subdivided into triplets (3 + 3) and accented on both the first and fourth notes. This is indicated by the beaming in the example below.

Some authorities treat both groupings as equally valid forms, while others dispute this, holding the first type to be the "true" (or "real") sextuplet, and the second type to be properly a "double triplet", which should always be written and named as such. Some go so far as to call the latter, when written with a numeral 6, a "false" sextuplet. Still others, on the contrary, define the sextuplet precisely and solely as the double triplet, and a few more, while accepting the distinction, contend that the true sextuplet has no internal subdivisions—only the first note of the group should be accented.)

==== Compound meter ====
In compound meter, even-numbered tuplets can indicate that a note value is changed in relation to the dotted version of the next higher note value. Thus, two duplet eighth notes (most often used in 6/8 meter) take the time normally totaled by three eighth notes, equal to a dotted quarter note. Four quadruplet (or quartole) eighth notes would also equal a dotted quarter note. The duplet eighth note is thus exactly the same duration as a dotted eighth note, but the duplet notation is far more common in compound meters.

A duplet in compound time is more often written as 2:3 (a dotted quarter note split into two duplet eighth notes) than 2:1 1/2 (a dotted quarter note split into two duplet quarter notes), even though the former is inconsistent with a quadruplet also being written as 4:3 (a dotted quarter note split into four quadruplet eighth notes).

=== Nested tuplets ===
On occasion, tuplets are used "inside" tuplets. These are referred to as nested tuplets.

== Counting ==
Tuplets can produce rhythms such as the hemiola or may be used as polyrhythms when played against the regular duration. They are extrametric rhythmic units. The example below shows sextuplets in quintuplet time.

Tuplets may be counted, most often at extremely slow tempos, using the least common multiple (LCM) between the original and tuplet divisions. For example, with a 3-against-2 tuplet (triplets) the LCM is 6. Since 6 ÷ 2 = 3 and 6 ÷ 3 = 2 the quarter notes fall every three counts (overlined) and the triplets every two (underlined):

1̅	2	3	4̅	5	6

This is fairly easily brought up to tempo, and depending on the music may be counted in tempo, while 7-against-4, having an LCM of 28, may be counted at extremely slow tempos but must be played intuitively ("felt out") at tempo:

1̅	2	3	4	5	6	7	8̅	9	10	11	12	13	14	1̅5̅	16	17	18	19	20	21	2̅2̅	23	24	25	26	27	28

To play a half-note (minim) triplet accurately in a bar of 4/4, count eighth-note triplets and tie them together in groups of four

With a stress on each target note, one would count: 1 – 2 – 3 1 – 2 – 3 1 – 2 – 3 1 – 2 – 3 1 The same principle can be applied to quintuplets, septuplets, and so on.

== See also ==
- Composite rhythm
- Cross-beat
- Duple and quadruple metre
- Metre (hymn)
- Metre (poetry)
- Metric modulation
- List of musical works in unusual time signatures
- Schaffel
- Sextuple metre
- Triple metre
