= Two hundred fifty-sixth note =

Musical note duration

Wolfgang Amadeus Mozart used 128th and 256th notes in his Variations on "Je suis Lindor", K. 354. at =40 (=20)

In music, a two hundred fifty-sixth note (North American), or demisemihemidemisemiquaver (British), is a note played for 1/256 of the duration of a whole note. It lasts half as long as a hundred twenty-eighth note and takes up one quarter of the length of a sixty-fourth note. In musical notation it has a total of six flags or beams.

A single 256th note is always stemmed with flags, while two or more are usually beamed in groups. Notes this short are very rare in printed music, but not unknown. They are principally used for brief, rapid sections in slow movements. For example, they occur in some editions of the second movement (Largo) of Beethoven's Third Piano Concerto (Op. 37) (1800), to notate rapid scales. Another example is in Mozart's Variations on "Je suis Lindor" (1778), where four of them are used in the slow (molto adagio) eleventh variation. A further example occurs (Grave.Adagio non troppo) in Jan Ladislav Dussek's (1760–1812) Fifth Piano Sonata, Op. 10 No. 2. They also occur (Largo) in Vivaldi's (1678–1741) Concerto, RV 444, and in bar 15 of François Couperin's Second Prelude from L'art de toucher le clavecin (1716).

256th note

256th rest

== Even shorter notes ==
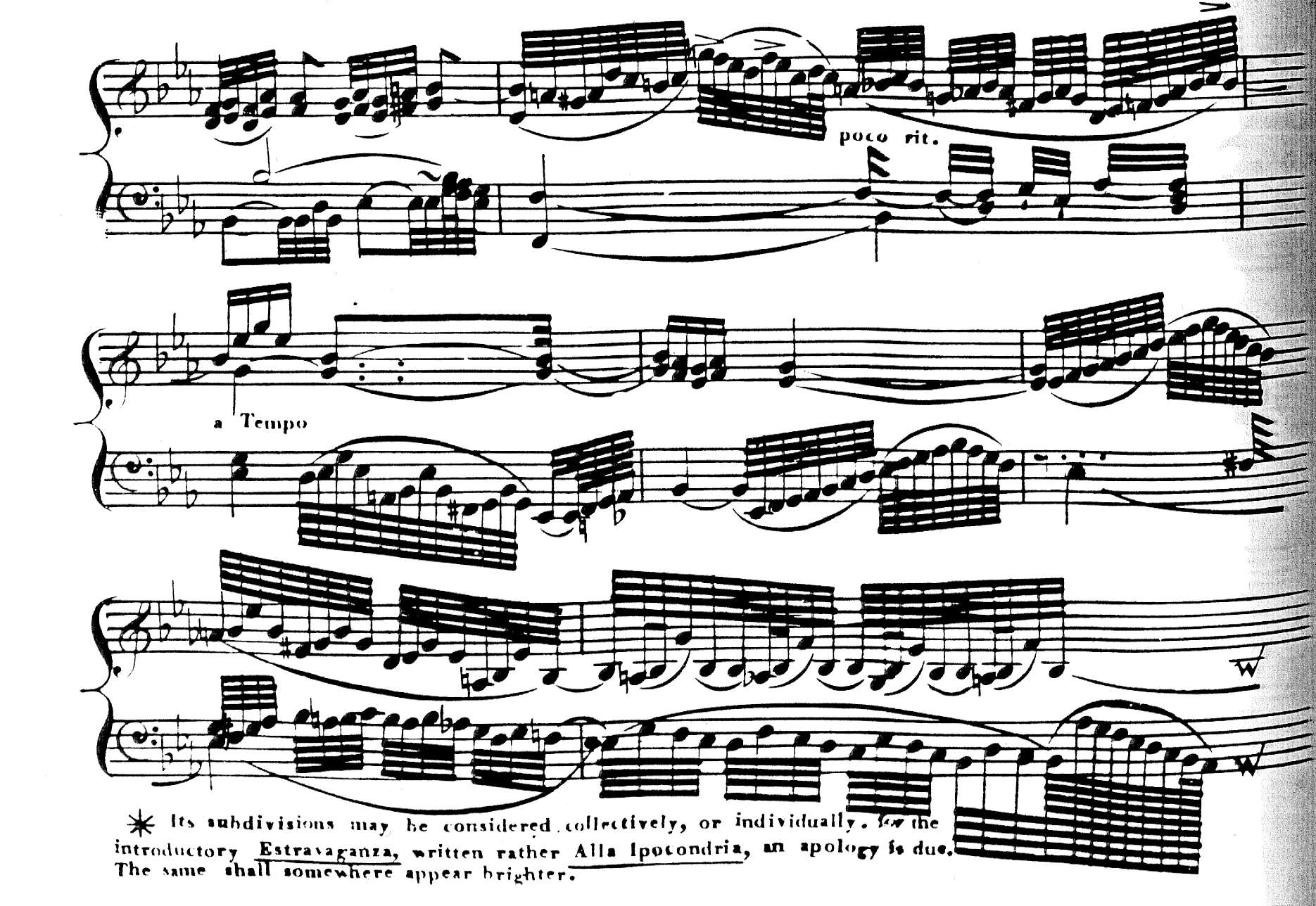
Some 128th notes with 5 beams are shown in this passage from Heinrich's Toccata Grande Cromatica. The pair of 2048th notes with 9 beams that appear at the end of this passage were notation errors; they should have been 1024th notes. Likewise, the seven notes that correctly precede it, written as 1024th notes (8 beams), should have been 512th notes.

The next note value shorter than the two hundred fifty-sixth note is the five hundred twelfth note with seven flags or beams; it is half as long as the two hundred fifty-sixth note. After this would come the thousand twenty-fourth note (eight flags or beams), the two thousand forty-eighth note (nine flags or beams), the four thousand ninety-sixth note (ten flags or beams), and so on indefinitely, with each note half the length of its predecessor. Anthony Philip Heinrich's Toccata Grande Cromatica from The Sylviad, Set 2, written around 1825, contains two 1024th notes (notated incorrectly as 2048ths). 256th notes occur frequently in this piece, and some 512th notes also appear; the passage is marked grave but the composer also intended a huge ritardando. Also, in the fourth and final movement of Charles Ives' Concord Sonata, two 64th notes are incorrectly written as 1024th.

Brian Ferneyhough uses many note and rest values well smaller than a 256th note and rest in his works Quirl (2011–2013) and Inconjunctions (2014). In Inconjunctions, in addition to occasional 512th and 1024th rests, there are multiple examples of 4096th notes. Many of these are also contained within tuplets, making their ratio to the whole note even smaller.

=== Software ===
Sibelius supports 512th notes (with 7 beams) as of version 7. MuseScore supports up to a 1024th note (with 8 beams), which is also the shortest duration in the SMuFL standard. The shortest duration supported by Finale is a 4096th note (with 10 beams), while LilyPond can write notes as short as a 1073741824th (2^{−30}) note with up to 28 beams.

== See also ==
- List of musical symbols
- Snare rush
- Totalism
