= Sixteenth note =

Musical note duration

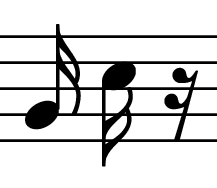
Figure 1. A 16th note with stem facing up, a 16th note with stem facing down, and a 16th rest.

Figure 2. Four 16th notes beamed together.

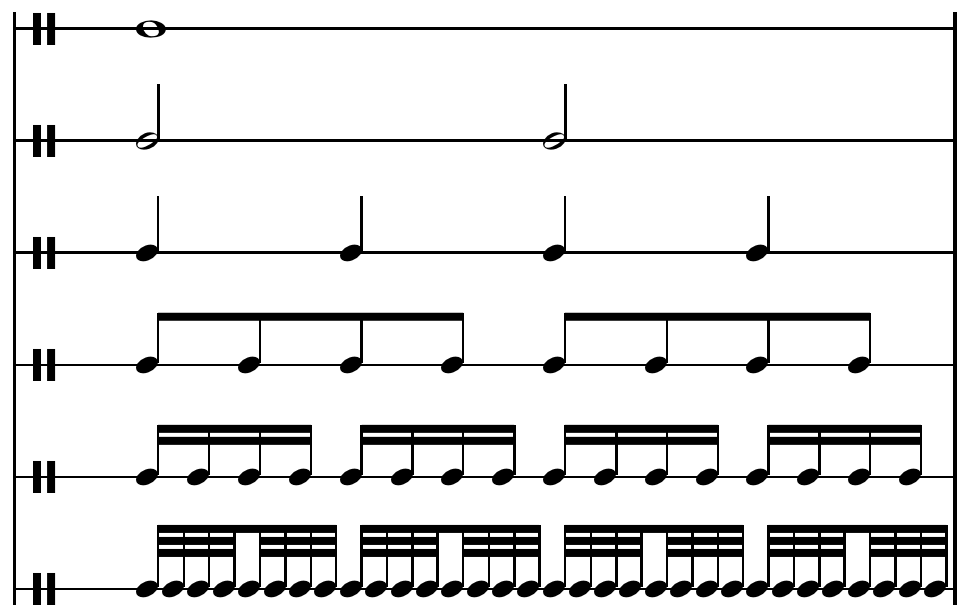
Comparison of duple note values: = 2×, etc.

Drum pattern, s on bass and snare, accompanied by ride patterns of various duple lengths from to 128th (all at =60)
1	2	4	8
16	32	64	128

In music, a 1/16, sixteenth note (American) or semiquaver (British) is a note played for half the duration of an eighth note (quaver), hence the names. It is the equivalent of the semifusa in mensural notation, first found in 15th-century notation.

Sixteenth notes are notated with an oval, filled-in note head and a straight note stem with two flags (see Figure 1). A single sixteenth note is always stemmed with flags, while two or more are usually beamed in groups. A corresponding symbol is the sixteenth rest (or semiquaver rest), which denotes a silence for the same duration. As with all notes with stems, sixteenth notes are drawn with stems to the right of the notehead, facing up, when they are below the middle line of the musical staff (or on the middle line, in vocal music). When they are on the middle line (in instrumental music) or above it, they are drawn with stems on the left of the note head, facing down. Flags are always on the right side of the stem, and curve to the right. On stems facing up, the flags start at the top and curve down; for downward facing stems, the flags start at the bottom of the stem and curve up. When multiple sixteenth notes or eighth notes (or thirty-second notes, etc.) are next to each other, the flags may be connected with a beam, like the notes in Figure 2. Note the similarities in notating sixteenth notes and eighth notes. Similar rules apply to smaller divisions such as thirty-second notes (demisemiquavers) and sixty-fourth notes (hemidemisemiquavers).

In Unicode, U+266C (♬) is a pair of beamed semiquavers.

The note derives from the semifusa in mensural notation. However, semifusa also designates the modern sixty-fourth note in Spanish, Catalan and Portuguese.

== See also ==
- List of musical symbols
