= Sixty-fourth note =

Musical note duration

In music notation, a sixty-fourth note (North American), also known as a hemidemisemiquaver or semidemisemiquaver (both used in other Anglosphere countries), sometimes called a half-thirty-second note, is a note played for half the duration of a thirty-second note (or demisemiquaver), hence the name. It first occurs in the late 17th century and, apart from rare occurrences of hundred twenty-eighth notes (semihemidemisemiquavers) and two hundred fifty-sixth notes (demisemihemidemisemiquavers), it is the shortest value found in musical notation.

Figure 1

Sixty-fourth notes are notated with a filled-in oval notehead and a straight note stem with four flags. The stem is drawn to the left of the notehead going downward when the note is above or on the middle line of the staff. When the notehead is below the middle line the stem is drawn to the right of the notehead going upward. A single 64th note is always stemmed with flags, while two or more are usually beamed in groups.

Figure 2: Sixty-fourth notes beamed together

A similar, but rarely encountered symbol is the sixty-fourth rest (or hemidemisemiquaver rest, shown in figure 1) which denotes silence for the same duration as a sixty-fourth note.

Notes shorter than a sixty-fourth note are very rarely used, though the hundred twenty-eighth note—otherwise known as the semihemidemisemiquaver—and even shorter notes, are occasionally found.

== See also ==
- List of musical symbols
