= Musical note =

Representation of isolatable musical sound

In music, notes are distinct and isolatable sounds that act as the most basic building blocks for nearly all of music. This discretization facilitates performance, comprehension, and analysis. Notes may be visually communicated by writing them in musical notation.

Notes can distinguish the general pitch class or the specific pitch played by a pitched instrument. Although this article focuses on pitch, notes for unpitched percussion instruments distinguish between different percussion instruments (and/or different manners to sound them) instead of pitch. Note value expresses the relative duration of the note in time. Dynamics for a note indicate how loud to play them. Articulations may further indicate how performers should shape the attack and decay of the note and express fluctuations in a note's timbre and pitch. Notes may even distinguish the use of different extended techniques by using special symbols.

The term note can refer to a specific musical event, for instance when saying the song "Happy Birthday to You", begins with two notes of identical pitch. Or more generally, the term can refer to a class of identically sounding events, for instance when saying "the song begins with the same note repeated twice."

== Distinguishing duration ==
A note can have a note value that indicates the note's duration relative to the musical meter. In order of halving duration, these values are:

	"American" name	"British" name
double whole note	double note	breve
whole note	whole note	semibreve
half note	half note	minim
quarter note	quarter note	crotchet
eighth note	eighth note	quaver
sixteenth note	sixteenth note	semiquaver
thirty-second note	thirty-second note	demisemiquaver
sixty-fourth note	sixty-fourth note	hemidemisemiquaver
𝅘𝅥𝅲	hundred twenty-eighth note	semihemidemisemiquaver, quasihemidemisemiquaver

Longer note values (e.g. the longa; twice the length of a breve) and shorter note values (e.g. the two hundred fifty-sixth note) do exist, but are very rare in modern times. These durations can further be subdivided using tuplets or extended using dots. Furthermore, a tie can combine two notes together to create a more specific duration which cannot be represented by a single note's value.

A rhythm is formed from a sequence in time of consecutive notes and rests (the spaces between notes) of various durations. Rhythms are agnostic to pitches, so if a melody is transposed to a different scale, its rhythm will remain constant.

== Distinguishing pitch ==
The note A or La notated as a symbol on a treble clef staff.

Latin alphabet names of notes of the A minor scale on a staff.

=== Distinguishing pitches of a scale ===
Music theory in most European countries and others (Note: Solfège is used in Albania, Belgium, Bulgaria, France, Greece, Italy, Portugal, Romania, Russia, Spain, Turkey, Ukraine, most Latin American countries, Arabic-speaking and Persian-speaking countries.) use the solfège naming convention. Fixed do uses the syllables re–mi–fa–sol–la–si specifically for the C major scale, while movable do labels notes of any major scale with that same order of syllables.

Alternatively, particularly in English- and some Dutch-speaking regions, and certainly in all of Germany, pitch classes are typically represented by the first seven letters of the Latin alphabet (A, B, C, D, E, F and G), corresponding to the A minor scale. Several European countries, including Germany and Czechia, use H instead of B (see § 12-tone chromatic scale for details). Byzantium used the names Pa–Vu–Ga–Di–Ke–Zo–Ni (Πα–Βου–Γα–Δι–Κε–Ζω–Νη). A single note is sometimes called a monad.

In traditional Indian music, musical notes are called svaras and commonly represented using the seven notes, Sa, Re, Ga, Ma, Pa, Dha and Ni.

=== Writing notes on a staff ===
In a score, each note is assigned a specific vertical position on a staff position (a line or space) on the staff, as determined by the clef. Each line or space is assigned a note name. These names are memorized by musicians and allow them to know at a glance the proper pitch to play on their instruments.

The staff above shows the notes C, D, E, F, G, A, B, C and then in reverse order, with no key signature or accidentals.

=== Accidentals ===
Notes that belong to the diatonic scale relevant in a tonal context are called diatonic notes. Notes that do not meet that criterion are called chromatic notes and are indicated by accidentals. Accidental symbols visually communicate a modification of a note's pitch from its tonal context. Most commonly, (Note: Another style of notation, rarely used in English, uses the suffix "is" to indicate a sharp and "es" (only "s" after A and E) for a flat (e.g. Fis for F♯, Ges for G♭, Es for E♭). This system first arose in Germany and is used in almost all European countries whose main language is not English, Greek, or a Romance language (such as French, Portuguese, Spanish, Italian, and Romanian). In most countries using these suffixes, the letter H is used to represent what is B natural in English, the letter B is used instead of B♭, and Heses (i.e., H𝄫) is used instead of B𝄫 (although Bes and Heses both denote the English B𝄫). Dutch-speakers in Belgium and the Netherlands use the same suffixes, but applied throughout to the notes A to G, so that B, B♭ and B have the same meaning as in English, although they are called B, Bes, and Beses instead of B, B flat and B double flat. Denmark also uses H, but uses Bes instead of Heses for B𝄫.) the sharp symbol (♯) raises a note by a half step, while the flat symbol (♭) lowers a note by a half step. This half step interval is also known as a semitone (which has an equal temperament frequency ratio of ^{12}√2 ≅ 1.0595). The natural symbol (♮) indicates that any previously applied accidentals should be cancelled. Advanced musicians use the double-sharp symbol to raise the pitch by two semitones, the double-flat symbol to lower it by two semitones, and even more advanced accidental symbols (e.g. for quarter tones). Accidental symbols are placed to the right of a note's letter when written in text (e.g. F♯ is F-sharp, B♭ is B-flat, and C♮ is C natural), but are placed to the left of a note's head when drawn on a staff.

Systematic alterations to any of the 7 lettered pitch classes are communicated using a key signature. When drawn on a staff, accidental symbols are positioned in a key signature to indicate that those alterations apply to all occurrences of the lettered pitch class corresponding to each symbol's position. Additional explicitly-noted accidentals can be drawn next to noteheads to override the key signature for all subsequent notes with the same lettered pitch class in that bar. However, this effect does not accumulate for subsequent accidental symbols for the same pitch class.

=== 12-tone chromatic scale ===
Assuming enharmonicity, accidentals can create pitch equivalences between different notes (e.g. the note B♯ represents the same pitch as the note C). Thus, a 12-note chromatic scale adds 5 pitch classes in addition to the 7 lettered pitch classes.

The following chart lists names used in different countries for the 12 pitch classes of a chromatic scale built on C. Their corresponding symbols are in parentheses. Differences between German and English notation are highlighted in bold typeface. Although the English and Dutch names are different, the corresponding symbols are identical.

Chromatic scale note naming conventions of various languages and countries
English	C	C sharp (C♯)	D	D sharp (D♯)	E	F	F sharp (F♯)	G	G sharp (G♯)	A	A sharp (A♯)	**B**
English	C	D flat (D♭)	D	E flat (E♭)	E	F	G flat (G♭)	G	A flat (A♭)	A	**B flat** **(B♭)**	**B**
German (Note: used in Austria, Czechia, Germany, Denmark, Estonia, Finland, Hungary, Iceland, Norway, Poland, Serbia, Slovakia, Slovenia, Sweden and Switzerland.)	C	Cis (C♯)	D	Dis (D♯)	E	F	Fis (F♯)	G	Gis (G♯)	A	Ais (A♯)	**H**
German	C	Des (D♭)	D	Es (E♭)	E	F	Ges (G♭)	G	As (A♭)	A	**B**	**H**
Swedish compromise	C	Ciss (C♯)	D	Diss (D♯)	E	F	Fiss (F♯)	G	Giss (G♯)	A	Aiss (A♯)	**H**
Swedish compromise	C	Dess (D♭)	D	Ess (E♭)	E	F	Gess (G♭)	G	Ass (A♭)	A	**Bess** **(B♭)**	**H**
Dutch (Note: used in the Netherlands, and sometimes in Scandinavia after the 1990s, and Indonesia.)	C	Cis (C♯)	D	Dis (D♯)	E	F	Fis (F♯)	G	Gis (G♯)	A	Ais (A♯)	B
Dutch	C	Des (D♭)	D	Es (E♭)	E	F	Ges (G♭)	G	As (A♭)	A	Bes (B♭)	B
Romance languages (Note: used in Italy (diesis/bemolle are Italian spellings), France, Belgium, Spain, Portugal, Romania, Bulgaria, Russia, Latvia, Greece, Turkey, Israel, Latin America and many other countries.)	do	do diesis (do♯)	re	re diesis (re♯)	mi	fa	fa diesis (fa♯)	sol	sol diesis (sol♯)	la	la diesis (la♯)	si
Romance languages	do	re bemolle (re♭)	re	mi bemolle (mi♭)	mi	fa	sol bemolle (sol♭)	sol	la bemolle (la♭)	la	si bemolle (si♭)	si
Byzantine	Ni	Ni diesis	Pa	Pa diesis	Vu	Ga	Ga diesis	Di	Di diesis	Ke	Ke diesis	Zo
Byzantine	Ni	Pa hyphesis	Pa	Vu hyphesis	Vu	Ga	Di hyphesis	Di	Ke hyphesis	Ke	Zo hyphesis	Zo
Japanese	Ha (ハ)	Ei-ha (嬰ハ)	Ni (ニ)	Ei-ni (嬰ニ)	Ho (ホ)	He (ヘ)	Ei-he (嬰へ)	To (ト)	Ei-to (嬰ト)	I (イ)	Ei-i (嬰イ)	Ro (ロ)
Japanese	Ha (ハ)	Hen-ni (変ニ)	Ni (ニ)	Hen-ho (変ホ)	Ho (ホ)	He (ヘ)	Hen-to (変ト)	To (ト)	Hen-i (変イ)	I (イ)	Hen-ro (変ロ)	Ro (ロ)
Hindustani Indian	Sa (सा)	Re Komal (रे॒)	Re (रे)	Ga Komal (ग॒)	Ga (ग)	Ma (म)	Ma Tivra (म॑)	Pa (प)	Dha Komal (ध॒)	Dha (ध)	Ni Komal (नि॒)	Ni (नि)
Carnatic Indian	Sa	Shuddha Ri (R1)	Chatushruti Ri (R2)	Sadharana Ga (G2)	Antara Ga (G3)	Shuddha Ma (M1)	Prati Ma (M2)	Pa	Shuddha Dha (D1)	Chatushruti Dha (D2)	Kaisika Ni (N2)	Kakali Ni (N3)
Carnatic Indian	Sa	Shuddha Ri (R1)	Shuddha Ga (G1)	Shatshruti Ri (R3)	Antara Ga (G3)	Shuddha Ma (M1)	Prati Ma (M2)	Pa	Shuddha Dha (D1)	Shuddha Ni (N1)	Shatshruti Dha (D3)	Kakali Ni (N3)
Bengali Indian	Sa (সা)	Komôl Re (ঋ)	Re (রে)	Komôl Ga (জ্ঞ)	Ga (গ)	Ma (ম)	Kôṛi Ma (হ্ম)	Pa (প)	Komôl Dha (দ)	Dha (ধ)	Komôl Ni (ণ)	Ni (নি)

=== Distinguishing pitches of different octaves ===
Two pitches that are any whole number of octaves apart (i.e. their fundamental frequencies are in a ratio equal to a power of two) are perceived as very similar. Because of that, all notes with these kinds of relations can be grouped under the same pitch class and are often given the same name.

The top note of a musical scale is the bottom note's second harmonic and has double the bottom note's frequency. Because both notes belong to the same pitch class, they are often called by the same name. That top note may also be referred to as the "octave" of the bottom note, since an octave is the interval between a note and another with double frequency.

==== Middle C ====
Middle C centrally
set on a grand staff

Middle C is often used as a common reference point when discussing octaves. This is the C between the typical treble and bass staves; either one ledger line below the treble staff, or one ledger line above the bass. In standard tuning it has a pitch of 261.626 Hz.

Middle C is a convenient reference, as it can be played on most common instruments. It can be sung by both male and female singers. It also falls near the middle of a standard 88-key piano.

The most common tuning, the A440 pitch standard, defines the A above middle C to be exactly 440 Hz.

==== Scientific versus Helmholtz pitch notation ====
Several nomenclature systems for differentiating pitches that have the same pitch class but which fall into different octaves.

1. Scientific pitch notation, where a pitch class letter (**C**, **D**, **E**, **F**, **G**, **A**, **B**) is followed by a subscript Arabic numeral designating a specific octave.
  - Middle **C** is named **C**_{4} and is the start of the 4th octave.
  - Higher octaves use successively higher number and lower octaves use successively lower numbers (including negative numbers)
  - The lowest note on most pianos is **A**_{0}, the highest is **C**_{8}.
2. Helmholtz pitch notation, which distinguishes octaves using prime symbols and letter case of the pitch class letter.
  - The scale is based on the **C** one octave below middle **C** (**C**_{3} in scientific pitch notation), sometimes called *tenor **C***.
  - The octave starting at tenor **C** are written as lower case letters, so tenor **C** itself is written **c** in Helmholtz notation.
  - Higher octaves are notated by appending additional prime symbols above the letter. Thus, middle C is written **c′**, the next octave **c′′**, etc.
  - Octaves below tenor **C** are written with upper case letters, with sub-prime symbols prepended for each additional octave. Thus the octaves below tenor **C** are written **C**, **͵C**, **͵͵C**, etc.
  - A number of typographic variants exist for Helmholtz notation. For instance, primes and sub-primes may be replaced with apostrophe and comma characters, sub-primes can be placed either before or after the note letter, or letters can be repeated (**͵͵C** = **C͵͵** = **C,,** = **CCC**).
  - Octaves are also named (see table below).
3. The MIDI standard for electronic musical instruments doesn't specifically designate pitch classes, but instead names pitches sequentially.
  - The supported lowest note, **C**_{−1} (≈ 8.1758 Hz), is numbered 0.
  - Subsequent notes are numbered chromatically to the highest, number 127 (**G**_{9} ≈ 12,544 Hz).
  - Although the MIDI standard is clear, the octaves actually played by any one MIDI device don't necessarily match the octaves shown below, especially in older instruments.

For instance, the standard 440 Hz tuning pitch is named A_{4} in scientific notation, a′ in Helmholtz notation, and number 69 in MIDI.

Comparison of pitch naming conventions over different octaves
Helmholtz notation		'Scientific' note names	Latin notation	MIDI note numbers	Frequency of that octave's A (in hertz)	Frequency of that octave's C (in hertz)
octave name	note names	'Scientific' note names	Latin notation	MIDI note numbers	Frequency of that octave's A (in hertz)	Frequency of that octave's C (in hertz)
sub-subcontra	**͵͵͵C** – **͵͵͵B**	**C**_{−1} – **B**_{−1}	**Do**_{−2} – **Si**_{−2}	0 – 11	13.75	8.176
sub-contra	**͵͵C** – **͵͵B**	**C**_{0} – **B**_{0}	**Do**_{−1} – **Si**_{−1}	12 – 23	27.5	16.352
contra	**͵C** – **͵B**	**C**_{1} – **B**_{1}	**Do**_{0} – **Si**_{0}	24 – 35	55	32.703
great	**C** – **B**	**C**_{2} – **B**_{2}	**Do**_{1} – **Si**_{1}	36 – 47	110	65.406
small	**c** – **b**	**C**_{3} – **B**_{3}	**Do**_{2} – **Si**_{2}	48 – 59	220	130.813
one-lined	**c′** – **b′**	**C**_{4} – **B**_{4}	**Do**_{3} – **Si**_{3}	60 – 71	440	261.626
two-lined	**c″** – **b″**	**C**_{5} – **B**_{5}	**Do**_{4} – **Si**_{4}	72 – 83	880	523.251
three-lined	**c‴** – **b‴**	**C**_{6} – **B**_{6}	**Do**_{5} – **Si**_{5}	84 – 95	1 760	1046.502
four-lined	**c⁗** – **b⁗**	**C**_{7} – **B**_{7}	**Do**_{6} – **Si**_{6}	96 – 107	3 520	2093.005
five-lined	**c″‴** – **b″‴**	**C**_{8} – **B**_{8}	**Do**_{7} – **Si**_{7}	108 – 119	7 040	4186.009
six-lined	**c″⁗** – **b″⁗**	**C**_{9} – **B**_{9}	**Do**_{8} – **Si**_{8}	120 – 127 (ends at **G**_{9})	14 080	8372.018

=== Pitch frequency in hertz ===
Pitch is associated with the frequency of physical oscillations measured in hertz (Hz) representing the number of these oscillations per second. While notes can have any arbitrary frequency, notes in more consonant music tend to have pitches with simpler mathematical ratios to each other.

Western music defines pitches around a central reference "concert pitch" of A_{4}, currently standardized as 440 Hz. Notes played in tune with the 12 equal temperament system will be an integer number $h$ of half-steps above (positive $h$) or below (negative $h$) that reference note, and thus have a frequency of:

$$f = 2^\frac{h}{12} \times 440 \text{ Hz}.\,$$

Octaves automatically yield powers of two times the original frequency, since $h$ can be expressed as $12v$ when $h$ is a multiple of 12 (with $v$ being the number of octaves up or down). Thus the above formula reduces to yield a power of 2 multiplied by 440 Hz:

$$\begin{align}
f &= 2^\frac{12v}{12} \times \text{440 Hz}\\
&= 2^v \times \text{440 Hz} \,.
\end{align}$$

==== Logarithmic scale ====
Logarithmic plot of frequency in hertz versus pitch of a chromatic scale starting on middle C. Each subsequent note has a pitch equal to the frequency of the prior note's pitch multiplied by ^{12}√2.

The base-2 logarithm of the above frequency–pitch relation conveniently results in a linear relationship with $h$ or $v$:

$$\begin{align}
\log_{2}(f) &= \tfrac{h}{12} + \log_{2}(\text{440 Hz})\\
&= v + \log_{2}(\text{440 Hz}).
\end{align}$$

When dealing specifically with intervals (rather than absolute frequency), the constant $\log_{2}(\text{440 Hz})$ can be conveniently ignored, because the difference between any two frequencies $f_1$ and $f_2$ in this logarithmic scale simplifies to:

$$\begin{align}
\log_{2}(f_1) - \log_{2}(f_2) &= \tfrac{h_1}{12} - \tfrac{h_2}{12}\\
&= v_1 - v_2 \,.
\end{align}$$

Cents are a convenient unit for humans to express finer divisions of this logarithmic scale that are 1/100^{th} of an equally-tempered semitone. Since one semitone equals 100 cents, one octave equals 12 ⋅ 100 cents = 1200 cents. Cents correspond to a difference in this logarithmic scale, however in the regular linear scale of frequency, adding 1 cent corresponds to multiplying a frequency by ^{1200}√2 (≅ 1.000578).

==== MIDI ====
For use with the MIDI (Musical Instrument Digital Interface) standard, a frequency mapping is defined by:

$$p = 69 + 12 \times \log_2\frac{f}{440 \text{ Hz}} \, ,$$

where $p$ is the MIDI note number. 69 is the number of semitones between C_{−1} (MIDI note 0) and A_{4}.

Conversely, the formula to determine frequency from a MIDI note $p$ is:

$$f=2^\frac{p-69}{12} \times 440 \text{ Hz} \, .$$

=== Pitch names and their history ===
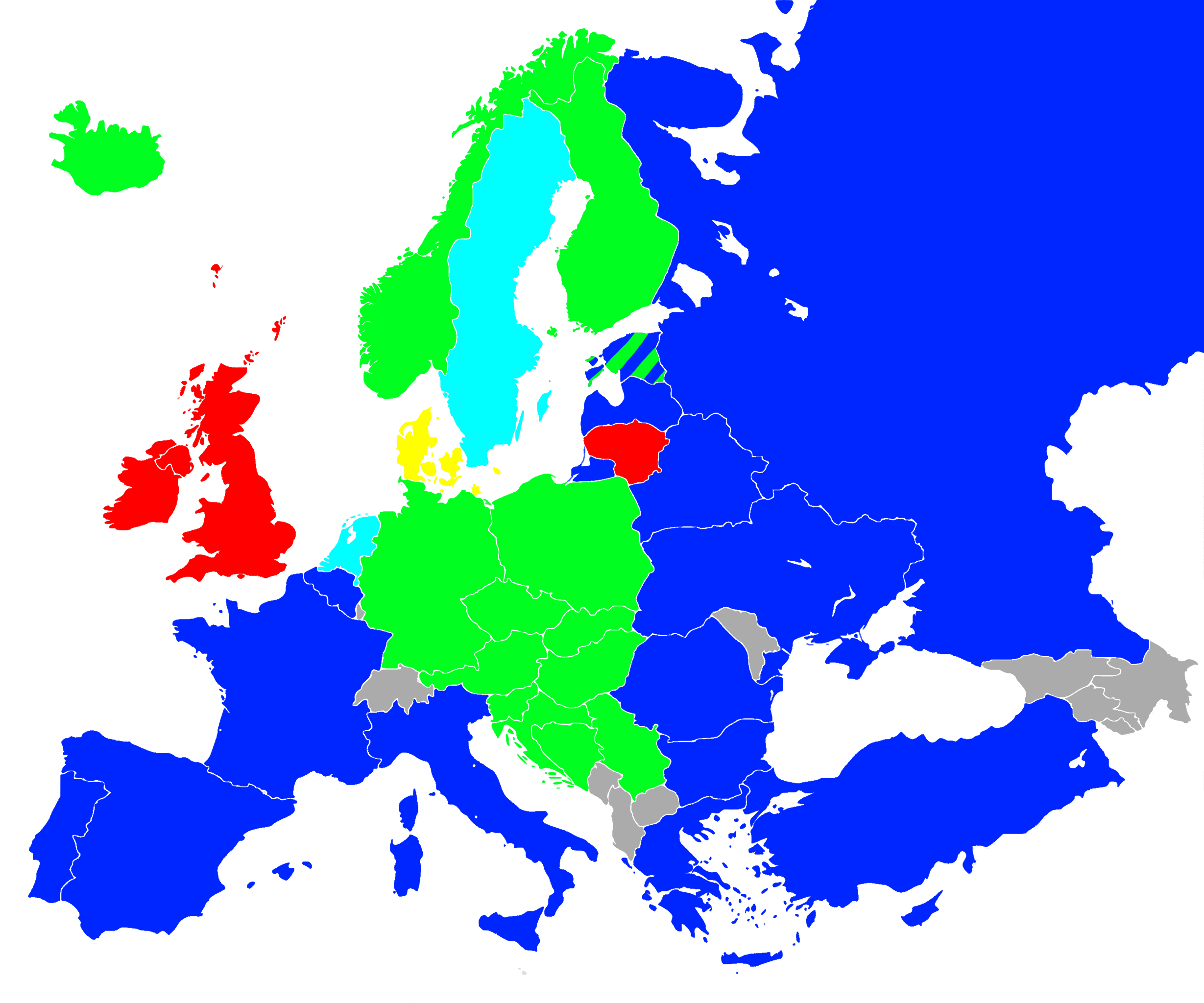
Map of current European preferred note naming Fixed do solfège (Si, La diesis, Si bemolle) English system (B, A#, Bb) German system (H, Ais, B) Dutch system (B, Ais, Bes) Danish system (H, A#, Bb) No data

Music notation systems have used letters of the alphabet for centuries. The 6th century philosopher Boethius is known to have used the first fourteen letters of the classical Latin alphabet (the letter J did not exist until the 16th century),

A B C D E F G H I K L M N O

to signify the notes of the two-octave range that was in use at the time and in modern scientific pitch notation are represented as

A_{2} B_{2} C_{3} D_{3} E_{3} F_{3} G_{3} A_{3} B_{3} C_{4} D_{4} E_{4} F_{4} G_{4}

Though it is not known whether this was his devising or common usage at the time, this is nonetheless called Boethian notation. Although Boethius is the first author known to use this nomenclature in the literature, Ptolemy wrote of the two-octave range five centuries before, calling it the perfect system or complete system – as opposed to other, smaller-range note systems that did not contain all possible species of octave (i.e., the seven octaves starting from A, B, C, D, E, F, and G). A modified form of Boethius' notation later appeared in the Dialogus de musica (ca. 1000) by Pseudo-Odo, in a discussion of the division of the monochord.

Following this, the range (or compass) of used notes was extended to three octaves, and the system of repeating letters A–G in each octave was introduced, these being written as lower-case for the second octave (a–g) and double lower-case letters for the third (aa–gg). When the range was extended down by one note, to a G, that note was denoted using the Greek letter gamma (Γ), the lowest note in Medieval music notation. (It is from this gamma that the French word for scale, gamme derives, and the English word gamut, from "gamma-ut".)

The remaining five notes of the chromatic scale (the black keys on a piano keyboard) were added gradually; the first being B♭, since B was flattened in certain modes to avoid the dissonant tritone interval. This change was not always shown in notation, but when written, B♭ (B flat) was written as a Latin, cursive "𝒷", and B♮ (B natural) a Gothic script (known as Blackletter) or "hard-edged" 𝔟. These evolved into the modern flat (♭) and natural (♮) symbols respectively.

==== B♭, B and H ====
In parts of Europe, including Germany, Czechia, Slovakia, Poland, Hungary, Norway, Denmark, Serbia, Croatia, Slovenia, Finland, and Iceland (as well as Sweden before the 1990s), the Gothic 𝔟 transformed into the letter h. Therefore, in current German music terminology, H is used instead of B♮ (B natural), and B instead of B♭ (B flat).

==== System "do–re–mi–fa–sol–la–si" ====
In Italian, Portuguese, Spanish, French, Romanian, Greek, Albanian, Russian, Mongolian, Flemish, Persian, Arabic, Hebrew, Ukrainian, Bulgarian, Turkish and Vietnamese the note names are do–re–mi–fa–sol–la–si rather than C–D–E–F–G–A–B. These names follow the original names reputedly given by Guido d'Arezzo, who had taken them from the first syllables of the first six musical phrases of a Gregorian chant melody Ut queant laxis, whose successive lines began on the appropriate scale degrees. These became the basis of the solfège system. For ease of singing, the name ut was largely replaced by do (most likely from the beginning of Dominus, "Lord"), though ut is still used in some places. It was the Italian musicologist and humanist Giovanni Battista Doni (1595–1647) who successfully promoted renaming the name of the note from ut to do. For the seventh degree, the name si (from Sancte Iohannes, St. John, to whom the hymn is dedicated), though in some regions the seventh is named ti (again, easier to pronounce while singing).

== See also ==
- Ghost note
- Grace note
- Letter notation
- Musical tone
- Pensato
- Shape note

== Bibliography ==
- Nattiez, Jean-Jacques (1990) [1987]. Music and Discourse: Toward a Semiology of Music [Musicologie générale et sémiologie]. Translated by Carolyn Abbate. Princeton University Press. ISBN 0-691-02714-5.
