= Hundred twenty-eighth note =

Musical note duration

Beethoven used hundred twenty-eighth notes in the first movement of his Pathétique Sonata (Op. 13)

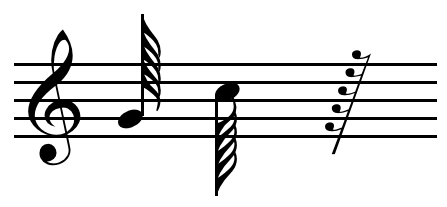
A hundred twenty-eighth note with stem pointing up, a hundred twenty-eighth note with stem pointing down, and a hundred twenty-eighth rest.

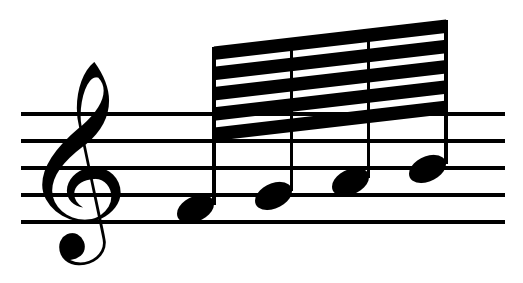
Hundred twenty-eighth notes beamed together.

In music, a hundred twenty-eighth note (North American) or semihemidemisemiquaver or quasihemidemisemiquaver (British) is a note played for 1/128 of the duration of a whole note. It lasts half as long as a sixty-fourth note. It has a total of five flags or beams.

A single 128th note is always stemmed with flags, while two or more are usually beamed in groups. Notes this short are very rare in printed music, but not unknown. One reason that notes with many beams are rare is that, for instance, a thirty-second note at = 50 lasts the same amount of time as a sixteenth note at = 100; every note in a piece may be notated as twice as long but last the same amount of time if the tempo is also doubled. They are principally used for brief, rapid sections in slow movements. For example, they occur in the first movement of Beethoven's Pathétique Piano Sonata (Op. 13), to notate rapid scales. Another example is in Mozart's Variations on Je suis Lindor, where many of them are used in the slow twelfth variation. Likewise, 128th notes are used in the explicitly notated ornamental runs in the opening Adagio of Bach's g minor Sonata for Unaccompanied Violin (BWV 1001).

These five-beamed notes also appear occasionally where a passage is to be performed rapidly, but where the actual tempo is at the discretion of the performer rather than being a strict division of the beat. In such cases, the aggregate time of the notes may not add up exactly to a full measure, and the phrase may be marked with an odd time division to indicate this. Sometimes such notation is made using smaller notes, sized like grace notes. One rare instance where such five-beamed notes occur as acciaccaturas occurs in the final measures of No. 2 of Charles-Valentin Alkan's Trois grandes études, Op. 76.

Hundred twenty-eighth rests are also rare, but again not unknown. One is used in Beethoven's Piano Sonata No. 13 "Quasi una fantasia" (bar 24 in the adagio movement) where it is followed by an ascending run of 128th notes, as well as in the finale of Charles-Valentin Alkan's Grande sonate 'Les quatre âges'.

== See also ==
- List of musical symbols
