= Notehead =

Elliptical part of a note

Parts of the note

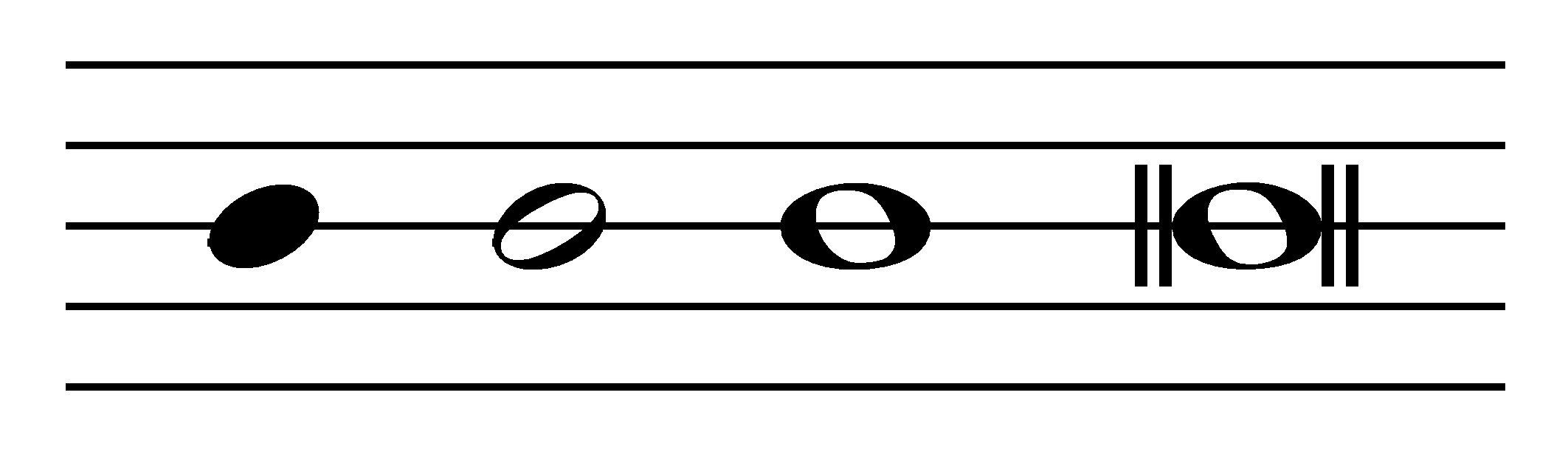
Noteheads of quarter (and all further subdivisions), half, whole, and double whole notes

Left: breve in modern notation. Centre: breve in mensural notation used in some modern scores as well. Right: less common stylistic variant of the first form.

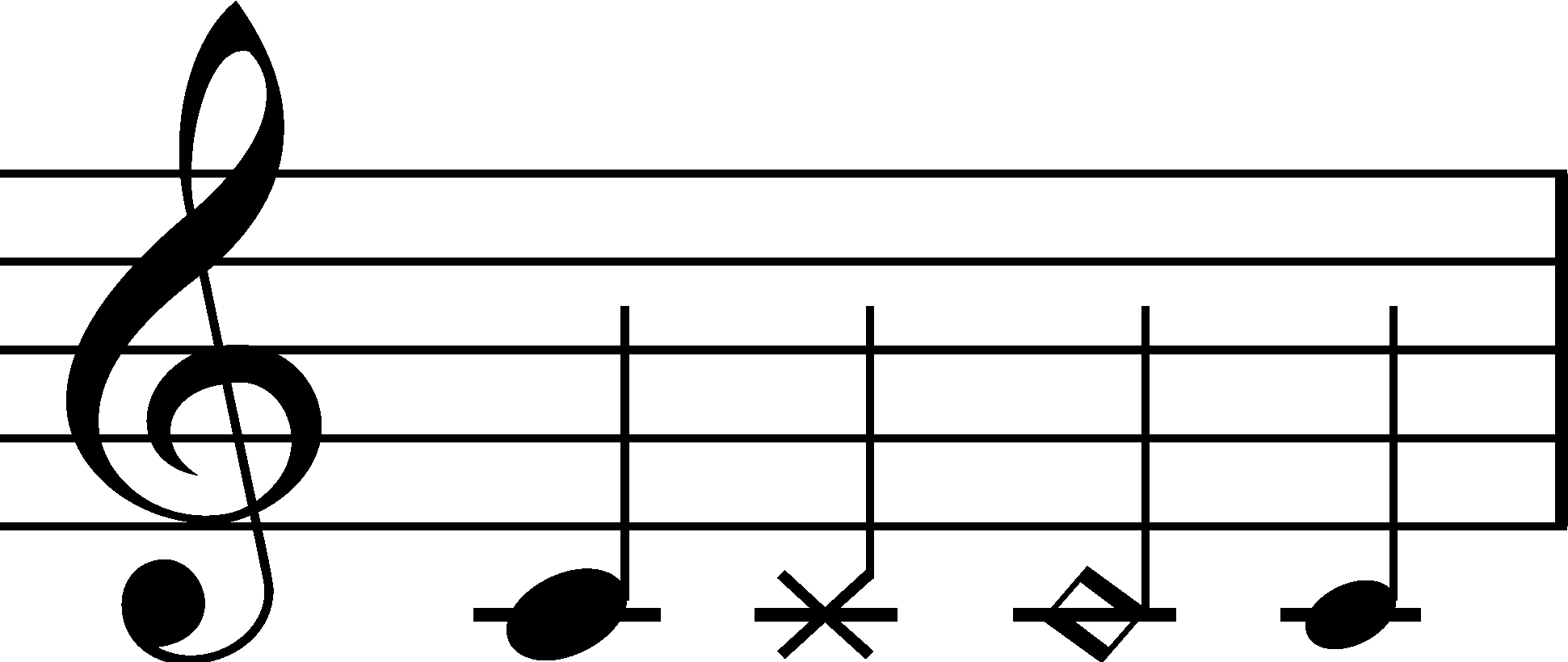
Regular, cross, square, and small noteheads

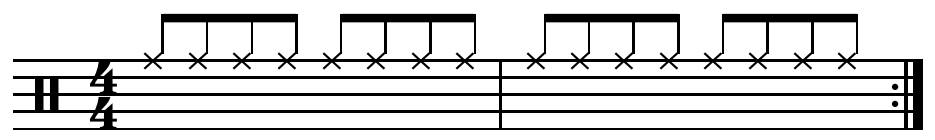
Ride pattern on a cymbal

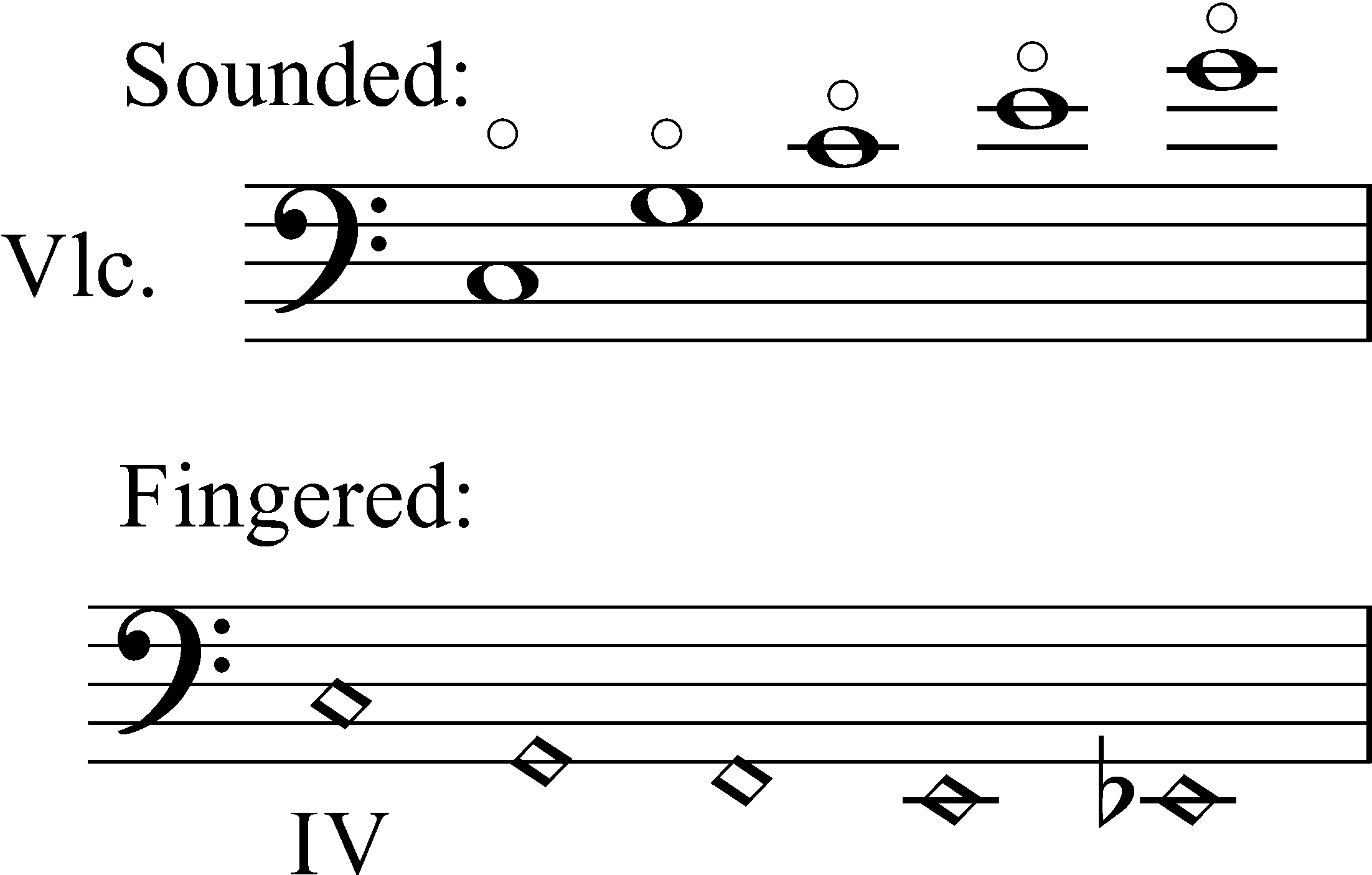
Natural harmonics on the cello notated first as sounded (more common), then as fingered (easier to sightread).

In music, a notehead is the part of a note, usually elliptical in shape, whose placement on the staff indicates the pitch, to which modifications are made that indicate duration. Noteheads may be the same shape but colored completely black or white, indicating the note value (i.e., rhythmic duration). In a whole note, the notehead, shaped differently than shorter notes, is the only component of the note. Shorter note values attach a stem to the notehead, and possibly beams or flags. The longer double whole note can be written with vertical lines surrounding it, two attached noteheads, or a rectangular notehead. An "x" shaped notehead may be used to indicate percussion, percussive effects (ghost notes), or speaking. A square, diamond, or box shaped notehead may be used to indicate a natural or artificial harmonic. A small notehead can be used to indicate a grace note.

== History ==
Noteheads ultimately derive from the neumes used to notate Gregorian chant. The punctum, seen at right, is the simplest of the shapes and most clearly anticipates the modern notehead. When placed on a clef, the position of a notehead indicates the relative pitch of a note. The development of different colors of noteheads, and the use of it to indicate rhythmic values, was the use of white mensural notation, adopted around 1450.

Franco of Cologne, ancient composer and music theorist, codified a system of rhythm notation. He explained this system in his work, Ars Cantus Mensurabilis (“The Art of Measurable Music”), circa 1280. In this system, the relative duration of notes was indicated by the note shapes. The noteheads were rectangles, squares, or diamonds depending on the note length. This system was expanded during the Ars Nova period.

Shortly before the Renaissance, scribes began to write the notes of the Franconian and Ars Nova style with open noteheads. During the Renaissance, composers added shorter note durations that used filled-in noteheads. Near the end of the 16th century, the square or diamond-shaped notes changed to the round noteheads that are used today.

== See also ==
- Note value
- Shape note
