= Eighth note =

Musical note duration

Figure 1. An eighth note with stem extending up, an eighth note with stem extending down, and an eighth rest.

Figure 2. Four eighth notes beamed together.

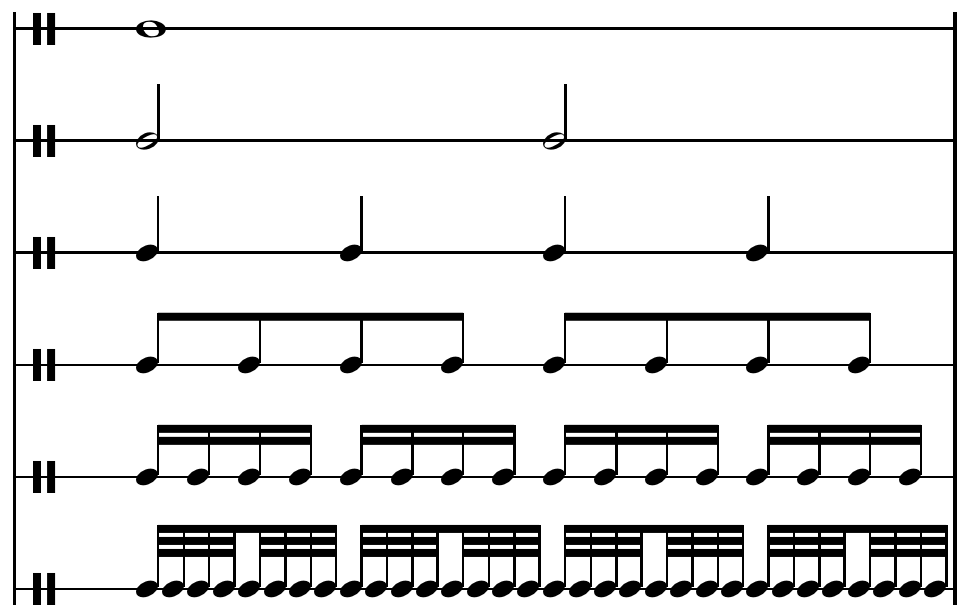
Comparison of duple note values: = 2×, etc.

Drum pattern, s on bass and snare, accompanied by ride patterns of various duple lengths from to 128th (all at =60)
1	2	4	8
16	32	64	128

An eighth note (American) or a quaver (British) is a musical note played for one eighth the duration of a whole note (semibreve). Its length relative to other rhythmic values is as expected—e.g., half the duration of a quarter note (crotchet), one quarter the duration of a half note (minim), and twice the value of a sixteenth note. It is the equivalent of the fusa in mensural notation.

== Notation ==
Eighth notes are notated with an oval, filled-in note head and a straight note stem with one note flag (see Figure 1). The stem is on the right of the notehead extending upwards or on the left extending downwards, depending primarily on where the notehead lies relative to the middle line of the staff. A related symbol is the eighth rest (or quaver rest), which denotes a silence for the same duration.

Eighth notes may be beamed together in groups (Figure 2). In 3/8, 6/8, 9/8, and 12/8 they are typically beamed in groups of three. A single eighth note is always stemmed with a flag, while two or more are usually beamed in groups in instrumental music.

In Unicode, the symbol U+266A (♪) is a single eighth note and U+266B (♫) is a beamed pair of eighth notes. These symbols are inherited from the early 1980s code page 437, where they occupied codes 13 and 14 respectively. Additions to the Unicode standard incorporated eighth note depictions from Japanese emoji sets: ascending eighth notes (U+1F39C, 🎜), descending eighth notes (U+1F39D, 🎝), a graphical generic musical note generally depicted as an eighth note (U+1F3B5, 🎵), and three unconnected eighth notes in sequence (U+1F3B6, 🎶). All of these are graphical dingbats. In contrast, Unicode's Musical Symbols block includes eighth note symbols designed to be used in computerized musical notation.

== See also ==
- List of musical symbols
