= Duration (music) =

Length of time which a note can last

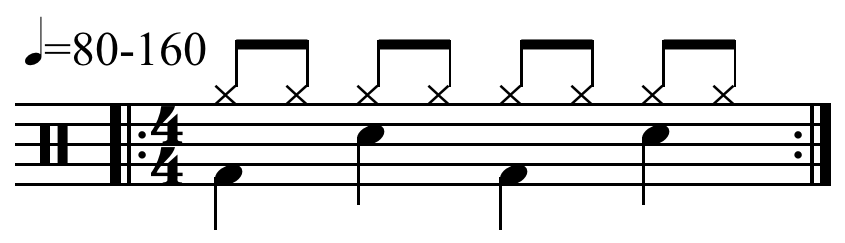
Simple [quadr]duple drum pattern, against which duration is measured in much popular music: divides two beats into two.

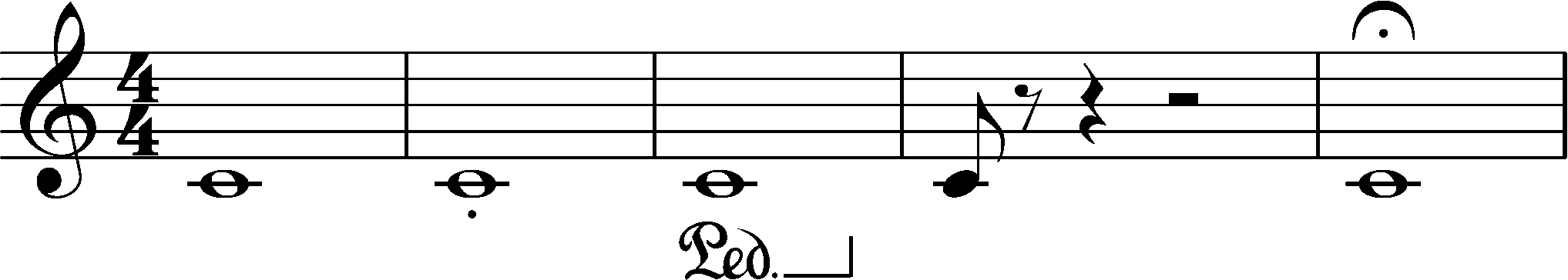
Various durations

In music, duration is an amount of time or how long or short a note, phrase, section, or composition lasts. "Duration is the length of time a pitch, or tone, is sounded." A note may last less than a second, while a symphony may last more than an hour. One of the fundamental features of rhythm, or encompassing rhythm, duration is also central to meter and musical form. Release plays an important part in determining the timbre of a musical instrument and is affected by articulation.

The concept of duration can be further broken down into those of beat and meter, where beat is seen as (usually, but certainly not always) a 'constant', and rhythm being longer, shorter or the same length as the beat. In serial music the beginning of a note may be considered, or its duration may be (for example, is a 6 the note which begins at the sixth beat, or which lasts six beats?).

Durations, and their beginnings and endings, may be described as long, short, or taking a specific amount of time. Often duration is described according to terms borrowed from descriptions of pitch. As such, the duration complement is the amount of different durations used, the duration scale is an ordering (scale) of those durations from shortest to longest, the duration range is the difference in length between the shortest and longest, and the duration hierarchy is an ordering of those durations based on frequency of use.

Durational patterns are the foreground details projected against a background metric structure, which includes meter, tempo, and all rhythmic aspects which produce temporal regularity or structure. Duration patterns may be divided into rhythmic units and rhythmic gestures (Winold, 1975, chap. 3). But they may also be described using terms borrowed from the metrical feet of poetry: iamb (weak–strong), anapest (weak–weak–strong), trochee (strong–weak), dactyl (strong–weak–weak), and amphibrach (weak–strong–weak), which may overlap to explain ambiguity.

== See also ==
- tuplet
