= Beam (music) =

Thick line used to connect notes in musical notation

A quaver, a dotted quaver, and a semiquaver, all joined with a primary beam (the semiquaver has a secondary beam)

In musical notation, a beam is a horizontal or diagonal line used to connect multiple consecutive notes (and occasionally rests) to indicate rhythmic grouping. Only eighth notes (quavers) or shorter can be beamed. The number of beams is equal to the number of flags that would be present on an unbeamed note. Beaming refers to the conventions and use of beams. A primary beam connects a note group unbroken, while a secondary beam is interrupted or partially broken.

== Grouping ==
Beam spans indicate rhythmic groupings, usually determined by the time signature. Therefore, beams do not usually cross bar lines or major subdivisions of bars. A single eighth note, or any faster note, is always stemmed with flags, while two or more are typically beamed in groups.

In modern practice, beams may span across rests in order to make rhythmic groups clearer.

=== Sub-grouping ===
Beyond basic note grouping, beams are often used to indicate internal rhythmic subdivisions. This is achieved by using primary and secondary beams.

For example, in a run of eight 16th notes, the entire sequence is unified by a continuous primary beam—the outermost line—which signifies the overarching beat or pulse. To clarify the internal structure, however, the secondary beams are interrupted between the fourth and fifth notes. By breaking these inner beams while maintaining the continuity of the primary beam, two distinct sub-groups of four notes are created.

This technique improves legibility and communicates the desired phrasing to the performer, without altering the underlying rhythmic value of the passage.

=== Vocal music ===
In vocal music, beams were traditionally used only to connect notes sung to the same syllable. In modern practice it is more common to use standard beaming rules, while indicating multi-note syllables with slurs.

== Positioning ==
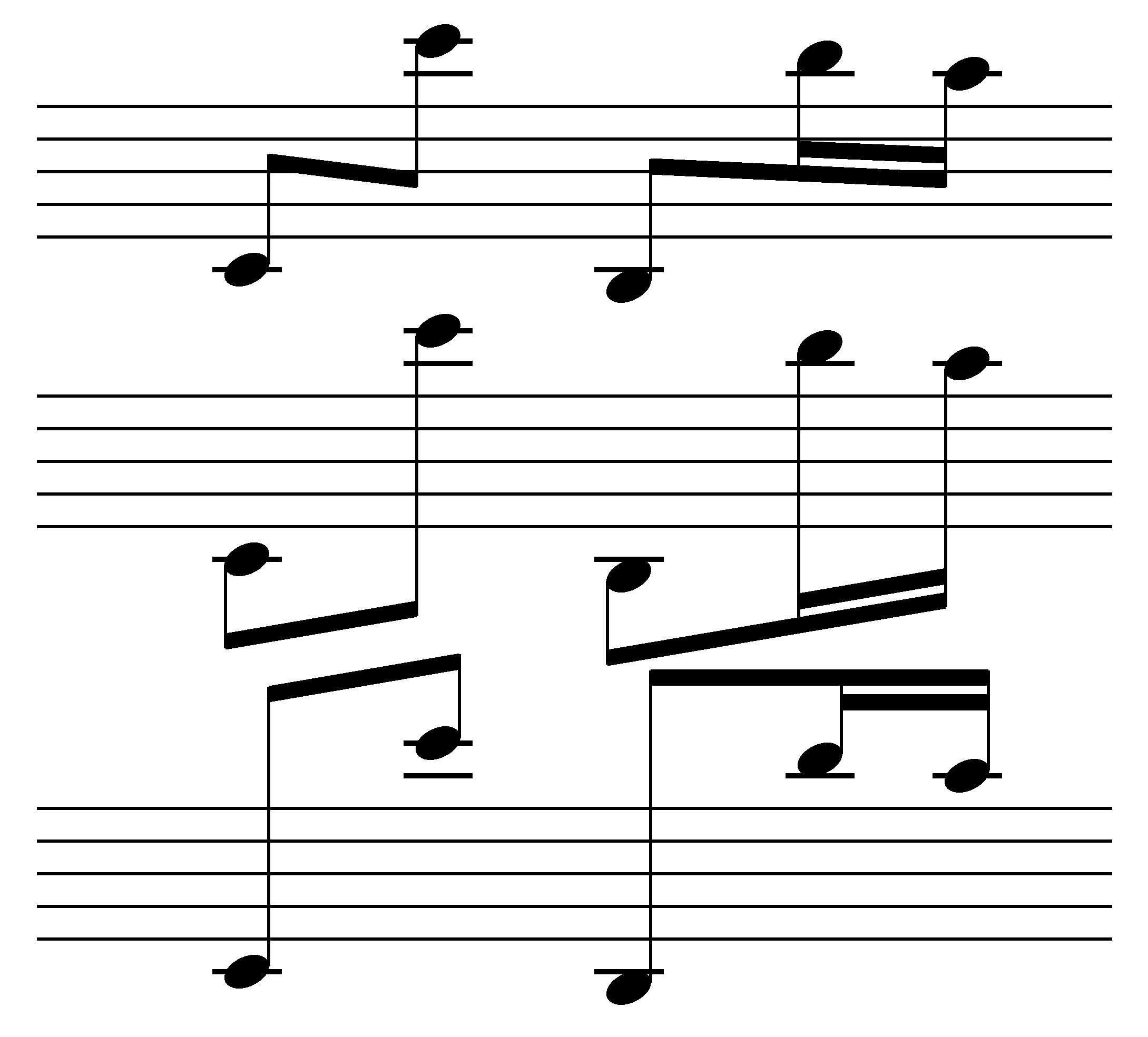
Midway beams, though exceptional, can help prevent crowded staves, thus the top staff may be preferable to the bottom two options

Notes joined by a beam usually have all the stems pointing in the same direction (up or down). The average pitch of the notes is used to determine the direction – if the average pitch is below the middle staff-line, the stems and beams usually go above the notehead, otherwise they go below.

The direction of beams usually follows the general direction of the notes it groups, slanting down if the notes go down, slanting up if the notes go up, and level if the first and last notes are the same.

== Feathered beaming ==
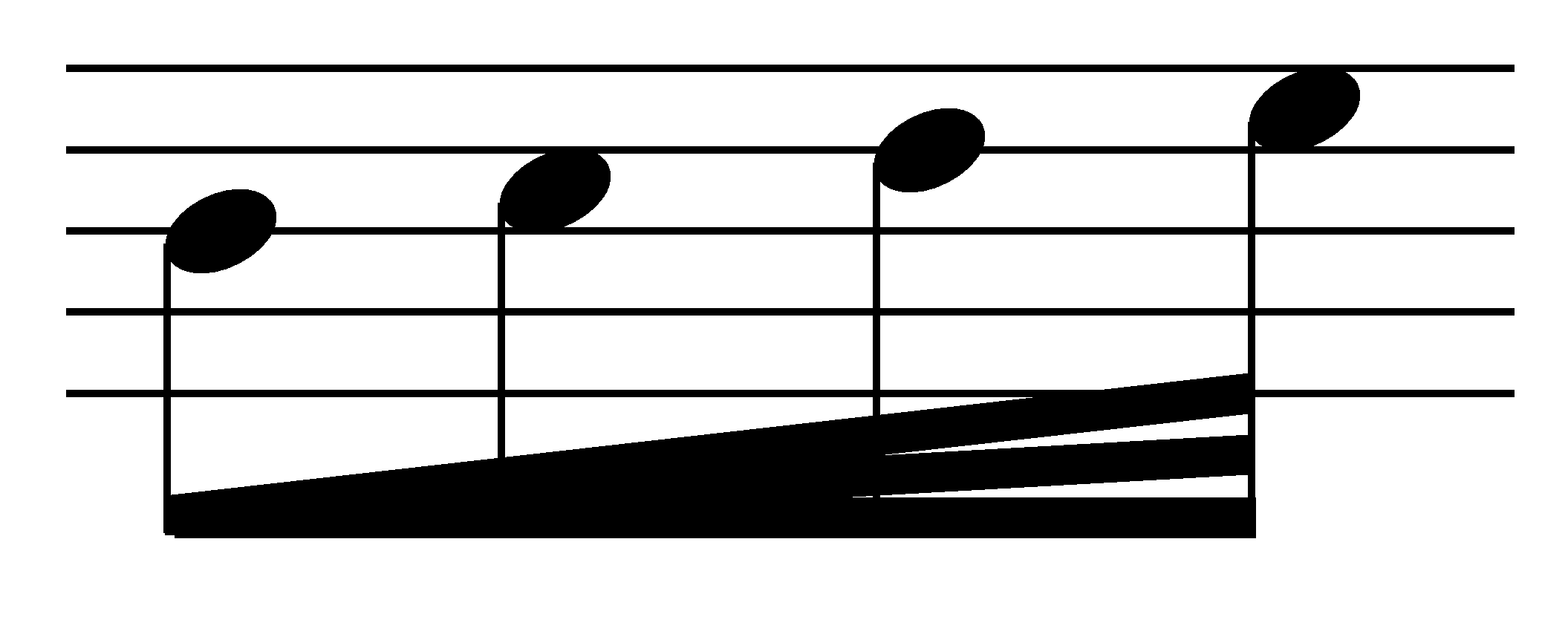
Feathered beams

Feathered beaming shows a gradual change in the speed of notes. It is shown with a primary straight beam and other diagonal secondary beams (that together resemble a feather, hence the name). These secondary beams suggest a gradual acceleration or deceleration from the first note value within the feathered beam to the last. (A beam getting wider from left to right shows acceleration.) The longest value possible to show being the eighth note (quaver). When the number of notes played is not of interest, but rather the effect of acceleration or deceleration, an approximate number of headless stems are used. To ensure clarity, sometimes the number of notes within the beam, or the duration of the total beamed notes, is shown above the music, as is done with tuplets.

== Tremolo ==
Multi-note tremolo

Single-note tremolo

Beams are also used as a notational abbreviation to indicate tremolos. If used for this purpose, a note, or pair of notes, of any value can be beamed and/or marked with beam-like strokes.
