= Byzantine Musical Symbols =

Unicode block (U+1D000..U+1D0FF)

- Range: U+1D000..U+1D0FF (256 code points)
- Plane: SMP
- Scripts: Common
- Symbol sets: Byzantine musical notation
- Assigned: 246 code points
- Unused: 10 reserved code points

Unicode Version History
- 3.1 (2001): 246 (+246)

Unicode documentation
- Code chart ∣ Web page

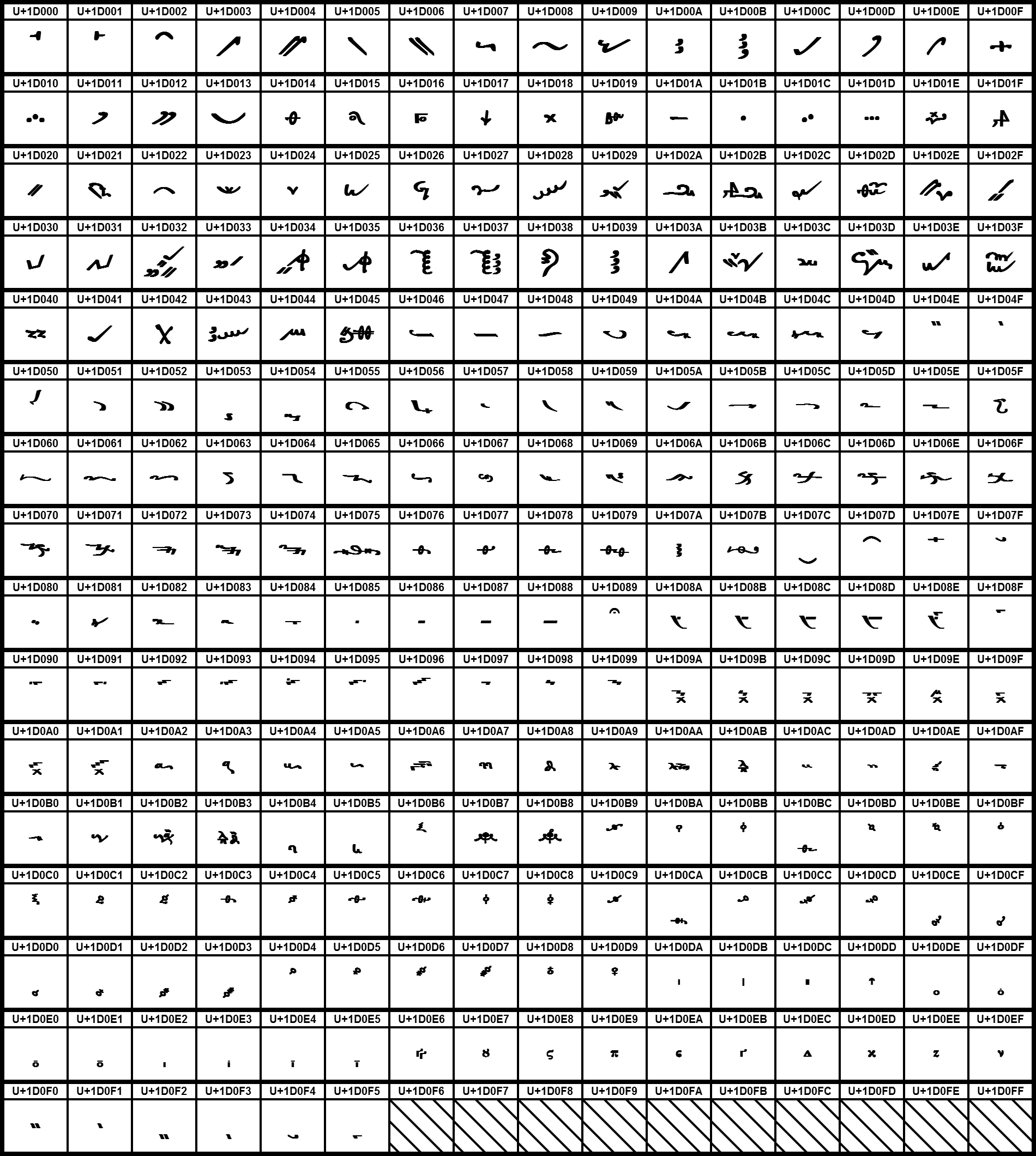
Graphical representation of the Byzantine Musical Symbols Unicode block

Byzantine Musical Symbols is a Unicode block containing characters for representing Byzantine music in ekphonetic notation.

== Block ==
Byzantine Musical Symbols^{[1]}^{[2]} Official Unicode Consortium code chart (PDF)
	0	1	2	3	4	5	6	7	8	9	A	B	C	D	E	F
U+1D00x	𝀀	𝀁	𝀂	𝀃	𝀄	𝀅	𝀆	𝀇	𝀈	𝀉	𝀊	𝀋	𝀌	𝀍	𝀎	𝀏
U+1D01x	𝀐	𝀑	𝀒	𝀓	𝀔	𝀕	𝀖	𝀗	𝀘	𝀙	𝀚	𝀛	𝀜	𝀝	𝀞	𝀟
U+1D02x	𝀠	𝀡	𝀢	𝀣	𝀤	𝀥	𝀦	𝀧	𝀨	𝀩	𝀪	𝀫	𝀬	𝀭	𝀮	𝀯
U+1D03x	𝀰	𝀱	𝀲	𝀳	𝀴	𝀵	𝀶	𝀷	𝀸	𝀹	𝀺	𝀻	𝀼	𝀽	𝀾	𝀿
U+1D04x	𝁀	𝁁	𝁂	𝁃	𝁄	𝁅	𝁆	𝁇	𝁈	𝁉	𝁊	𝁋	𝁌	𝁍	𝁎	𝁏
U+1D05x	𝁐	𝁑	𝁒	𝁓	𝁔	𝁕	𝁖	𝁗	𝁘	𝁙	𝁚	𝁛	𝁜	𝁝	𝁞	𝁟
U+1D06x	𝁠	𝁡	𝁢	𝁣	𝁤	𝁥	𝁦	𝁧	𝁨	𝁩	𝁪	𝁫	𝁬	𝁭	𝁮	𝁯
U+1D07x	𝁰	𝁱	𝁲	𝁳	𝁴	𝁵	𝁶	𝁷	𝁸	𝁹	𝁺	𝁻	𝁼	𝁽	𝁾	𝁿
U+1D08x	𝂀	𝂁	𝂂	𝂃	𝂄	𝂅	𝂆	𝂇	𝂈	𝂉	𝂊	𝂋	𝂌	𝂍	𝂎	𝂏
U+1D09x	𝂐	𝂑	𝂒	𝂓	𝂔	𝂕	𝂖	𝂗	𝂘	𝂙	𝂚	𝂛	𝂜	𝂝	𝂞	𝂟
U+1D0Ax	𝂠	𝂡	𝂢	𝂣	𝂤	𝂥	𝂦	𝂧	𝂨	𝂩	𝂪	𝂫	𝂬	𝂭	𝂮	𝂯
U+1D0Bx	𝂰	𝂱	𝂲	𝂳	𝂴	𝂵	𝂶	𝂷	𝂸	𝂹	𝂺	𝂻	𝂼	𝂽	𝂾	𝂿
U+1D0Cx	𝃀	𝃁	𝃂	𝃃	𝃄	𝃅	𝃆	𝃇	𝃈	𝃉	𝃊	𝃋	𝃌	𝃍	𝃎	𝃏
U+1D0Dx	𝃐	𝃑	𝃒	𝃓	𝃔	𝃕	𝃖	𝃗	𝃘	𝃙	𝃚	𝃛	𝃜	𝃝	𝃞	𝃟
U+1D0Ex	𝃠	𝃡	𝃢	𝃣	𝃤	𝃥	𝃦	𝃧	𝃨	𝃩	𝃪	𝃫	𝃬	𝃭	𝃮	𝃯
U+1D0Fx	𝃰	𝃱	𝃲	𝃳	𝃴	𝃵										
Notes 1.As of Unicode version 17.0 2.Grey areas indicate non-assigned code points

== History ==
The following Unicode-related documents record the purpose and process of defining specific characters in the Byzantine Musical Symbols block:

Version	Final code points (Note: Proposed code points and characters names may differ from final code points and names)	Count	UTC ID	L2 ID	WG2 ID	Document
3.1	U+1D000..1D0F5	246		X3L2/95-122	N1208	Byzantine musical notation system, 1995-03-30
3.1	U+1D000..1D0F5	246		X3L2/95-090	N1253 (doc, txt)	Umamaheswaran, V. S.; Ksar, Mike (1995-09-09), "6.4.2", Unconfirmed Minutes of WG 2 Meeting # 28 in Helsinki, Finland; 1995-06-26--27
3.1	U+1D000..1D0F5	246	UTC/1995-054			"Byzantine Music", Unicode Technical Committee Meeting #66, Draft Minutes, 1995-09-29
3.1	U+1D000..1D0F5	246			N1303 (html, doc)	Umamaheswaran, V. S.; Ksar, Mike (1996-01-26), "8.3 Byzantine music symbols", Minutes of Meeting 29, Tokyo
3.1	U+1D000..1D0F5	246	UTC/1996-013			McGowan, Rick (1996-03-08), Greek (Byzantine) Musical Notation System, Notes and observations on ISO/IEC JTC1/SC2/WG2 N1208 and attachments
3.1	U+1D000..1D0F5	246			N1375	Revised Proposal - Repertoire of Greek Byzantine Musical Notation System, 1996-04-16
3.1	U+1D000..1D0F5	246			N1353	Umamaheswaran, V. S.; Ksar, Mike (1996-06-25), "8.7.1", Draft minutes of WG2 Copenhagen Meeting # 30
3.1	U+1D000..1D0F5	246		L2/97-144	N1582	3rd revision for proposal of repertoire of Greek Byzantine Music Notation System, 1997-06-11
3.1	U+1D000..1D0F5	246		L2/97-288	N1603	Umamaheswaran, V. S. (1997-10-24), "8.3", Unconfirmed Meeting Minutes, WG 2 Meeting # 33, Heraklion, Crete, Greece, 20 June – 4 July 1997
3.1	U+1D000..1D0F5	246		L2/01-050	N2253	Umamaheswaran, V. S. (2001-01-21), "8.1 (Comments from Ireland section, Byzantine musical symbols item)", Minutes of the SC2/WG2 meeting in Athens, September 2000
3.1	U+1D000..1D0F5	246		L2/05-106		Nicholas, Nick (2005-05-02), Byzantine Musical Notation: Proposal for Changes
3.1	U+1D000..1D0F5	246		L2/05-153		Freytag, Asmus (2005-05-12), Recommendations on how to handle the input from document L2/05-106 Proposal for Changes in Byzantine Musical Notation
3.1	U+1D000..1D0F5	246		L2/05-108R		Moore, Lisa (2005-08-26), "Consensus 103-C16", UTC #103 Minutes, "Swap the glyphs for U+1D09C BYZANTINE MUSICAL SYMBOL AGOGI ARGI and U+1D09F BYZANTINE MUSICAL SYMBOL AGOGI GORGI."
3.1	U+1D000..1D0F5	246		L2/05-341		Anderson, Deborah (2005-10-25), Summary of proposed changes from L2/05-106, Byzantine Musical Notation

== See also ==
- Byzantine music
- Musical Symbols (Unicode block)
- Ancient Greek Musical Notation (Unicode block)
- Znamenny Musical Notation (Unicode block)
