= Musical Symbols Supplement =

- Range: U+1D250..U+1D28F (64 code points)
- Plane: SMP
- Scripts: Common (48 char.); Inherited (2 char.)
- Assigned: 50 code points
- Unused: 14 reserved code points

Unicode Version History
- 18.0 (2026): 50 (+50)

Unicode documentation
- Code chart ∣ Web page

Musical Symbols Supplement is a Unicode block created as an extension of the Musical Symbols block. It contains additional characters for musical notation.

== Block ==
Musical Symbols Supplement^{[1]}^{[2]} Official Unicode Consortium code chart (PDF)
	0	1	2	3	4	5	6	7	8	9	A	B	C	D	E	F
U+1D25x	𝉐	𝉑	𝉒	𝉓	𝉔	𝉕	𝉖	𝉗	𝉘	𝉙	𝉚	𝉛	𝉜	𝉝	𝉞	𝉟
U+1D26x	𝉠	𝉡	𝉢	𝉣	𝉤	𝉥	𝉦	𝉧	𝉨	𝉩	𝉪	𝉫	𝉬	𝉭	𝉮	𝉯
U+1D27x	𝉰	𝉱	𝉲	𝉳	𝉴	𝉵	𝉶	𝉷	𝉸	𝉹	𝉺	𝉻	𝉼	𝉽	𝉾	𝉿
U+1D28x	𝊀	𝊁														
Notes 1.As of Unicode version 18.0 2.Grey areas indicate non-assigned code points

== History ==
The following Unicode-related documents record the purpose and process of defining specific characters in the Musical Symbols Supplement block:

Version	Final code points (Note: Proposed code points and characters names may differ from final code points and names)	Count	L2 ID	Document
18.0	U+1D250..1D255	6	L2/24-172	Bala, Gavin Jared; Miller, Kirk (2024-07-05), Unicode request for 256th, 512th, and 1024th notes and rests
18.0	U+1D250..1D255	6	L2/24-166	Anderson, Deborah; Goregaokar, Manish; Kučera, Jan; Whistler, Ken; Pournader, Roozbeh; Constable, Peter (2024-07-18), "18. Music Symbols", Recommendations to UTC #180 July 2024 on Script Proposals
18.0	U+1D250..1D255	6	L2/24-159	Constable, Peter (2024-07-29), "Consensus 180-C39", UTC #180 Minutes, "Provisionally assign 6 musical symbol note and rest ..."
18.0	U+1D250..1D255	6	L2/25-226	"Consensus 185-C40", UTC #185 Minutes, 2025-10-29, "UTC accepts for encoding in Unicode 18.0 ..."
18.0	U+1D256..1D25A	5	L2/24-174	Bala, Gavin Jared; Miller, Kirk (2024-07-05), Unicode request for Turkish and Arabic accidentals
18.0	U+1D256..1D25A	5	L2/24-166	Anderson, Deborah; Goregaokar, Manish; Kučera, Jan; Whistler, Ken; Pournader, Roozbeh; Constable, Peter (2024-07-18), "19. Music Symbols", Recommendations to UTC #180 July 2024 on Script Proposals
18.0	U+1D256..1D25A	5	L2/24-159	Constable, Peter (2024-07-29), "Consensus 180-C40", UTC #180 Minutes, "Provisionally assign ..."
18.0	U+1D256..1D25A	5	L2/25-065	Bala, Gavin Jared; Miller, Kirk (2025-01-05), Response to feedback on the accidentals in L2/24-174
18.0	U+1D256..1D25A	5	L2/25-091R	Kučera, Jan; et al. (2025-04-22), "3.7 On the naming on some musical symbols", Recommendations to UTC #183 (April 2025) on Script Proposals
18.0	U+1D256..1D25A	5	L2/25-085	Leroy, Robin (2025-04-28), "Consensus 183-C21", UTC #183 Minutes, "Change the name of code point U+1D258 ..."
18.0	U+1D256..1D25A	5	L2/25-226	"Consensus 185-C39", UTC #185 Minutes, 2025-10-29, "UTC accepts for encoding in Unicode 18.0 ..."
18.0	U+1D25B..1D25F	5	L2/24-174	Bala, Gavin Jared; Miller, Kirk (2024-07-05), Unicode request for Turkish and Arabic accidentals
18.0	U+1D25B..1D25F	5	L2/25-065	Bala, Gavin Jared; Miller, Kirk (2025-01-05), Response to feedback on the accidentals in L2/24-174
18.0	U+1D25B..1D25F	5	L2/25-091R	Kučera, Jan; et al. (2025-04-22), "Consensus 183-C21", Recommendations to UTC #183 (April 2025) on Script Proposals, "Change the name of code point U+1D258 ..."
18.0	U+1D25B..1D25F	5	L2/25-085	Leroy, Robin (2025-04-28), "Consensus 183-C21", UTC #183 Minutes, "Change the name of code point U+1D258 ..."
18.0	U+1D25B..1D25F	5	L2/25-226	"Consensus 185-C40", UTC #185 Minutes, 2025-10-29, "UTC accepts for encoding in Unicode 18.0 ..."
18.0	U+1D260	1	L2/24-214	Bala, Gavin Jared; Miller, Kirk (2024-09-20), Unicode request for triple and quadruple flat
18.0	U+1D260	1	L2/24-228	Kučera, Jan; et al. (2024-11-01), "3.2 Music", Recommendations to UTC #181 (November 2024) on Script Proposals
18.0	U+1D260	1	L2/24-221	Constable, Peter (2024-11-12), "Consensus 181-C38", UTC #181 Minutes, "Provisionally assign ..."
18.0	U+1D260	1	L2/25-226	"Consensus 185-C40", UTC #185 Minutes, 2025-10-29, "UTC accepts for encoding in Unicode 18.0 ..."
18.0	U+1D261	1	L2/25-015	Bala, Gavin Jared; Miller, Kirk (2024-10-18), Unicode request for additional Baroque ornament
18.0	U+1D261	1	L2/25-010	Kučera, Jan; et al. (2025-01-16), "2.2 Music", Recommendations to UTC #182 (January 2025) on Script Proposals
18.0	U+1D261	1	L2/25-003	Leroy, Robin (2025-01-28), "Consensus 182-C11", UTC #182 Minutes, "Provisionally assign ..."
18.0	U+1D261	1	L2/25-226	"Consensus 185-C40", UTC #185 Minutes, 2025-10-29, "UTC accepts for encoding in Unicode 18.0 ..."
18.0	U+1D262..1D27F	30	L2/25-017	Bala, Gavin Jared; Miller, Kirk (2025-01-03), Unicode request for miscellaneous musical symbols
18.0	U+1D262..1D27F	30	L2/25-010	Kučera, Jan; et al. (2025-01-16), "2.1 Music", Recommendations to UTC #182 (January 2025) on Script Proposals
18.0	U+1D262..1D27F	30	L2/25-003	Leroy, Robin (2025-01-28), "Consensus 182-C10", UTC #182 Minutes, "Provisionally assign ..."
18.0	U+1D262..1D27F	30	L2/25-226	"Consensus 185-C40", UTC #185 Minutes, 2025-10-29, "UTC accepts for encoding in Unicode 18.0 ..."
18.0	U+1D262..1D27F	30	L2/26-006	Scherer, Markus; Hadley, Josh (2026-01-16), "1.3 U+1D26A: HALF FILLED or HALF-FILLED?", UTC #186 properties feedback & recommendations
18.0	U+1D262..1D27F	30	L2/26-003	"Consensus 186-C4", UTC #186 Minutes, 2026-02-01, "Change the name of U+1D26A ..."
18.0	U+1D280..1D281	2	L2/25-018	Bala, Gavin Jared; Miller, Kirk (2025-01-03), Unicode request for musical bowing symbols
18.0	U+1D280..1D281	2	L2/25-091R	Kučera, Jan; et al. (2025-04-22), "2.2 Music", Recommendations to UTC #183 (April 2025) on Script Proposals
18.0	U+1D280..1D281	2	L2/25-085	Leroy, Robin (2025-04-28), "Consensus 183-C13", UTC #183 Minutes, "Provisionally assign ..."
18.0	U+1D280..1D281	2	L2/25-226	"Consensus 185-C40", UTC #185 Minutes, 2025-10-29, "UTC accepts for encoding in Unicode 18.0 ..."

== See also ==
- Ancient Greek Musical Notation (Unicode block)
- Byzantine Musical Symbols (Unicode block)
