= Dionysius Thrax =

Greek grammarian (170–90 BC)

Dionysius Thrax (Ancient Greek: Διονύσιος ὁ Θρᾷξ, romanized: Dionýsios ho Thrâix, 170–90 BC) was a Greek grammarian and a pupil of Aristarchus of Samothrace. He was long considered to be the author of the earliest grammatical text on the Greek language, one that was used as a standard manual for perhaps some 1,500 years, and which was until recently regarded as the groundwork of the entire Western grammatical tradition. (Note: "Elle a été considérée comme le texte d'ancrage de toute la tradition grammaticale occidentale.")

== Life ==
His place of origin was not Thrace, as the epithet "Thrax" denotes, but probably Alexandria. His Thracian background was inferred from the name of his father Tērēs (Τήρης), which is considered to be a Thracian name. One of his co-students during his studies in Alexandria under Aristarchus was Apollodorus of Athens, who also became a distinguished grammarian. Rudolf Pfeiffer dates his shift to the isle of Rhodes to c. 144/143 BC, when political upheavals associated with the policies of Ptolemy VIII Euergetes II are thought to have led to his exile. According to a report in Athenaeus' Deipnosophistae (11,489a, b), his Rhodian pupils, grateful for his learning, gathered enough silver to enable him to fashion a cup whose shape aspired to recreate that of Nestor mentioned in the Iliad (Book 11, lines 632–637).

Dionysius was primarily a Homeric scholar, which was integral to his training under Aristarchus in Alexandria. His work shows some influence of earlier Stoic grammatical theory, particularly on word classes. He is also reported by Varro to have been an erudite analyst of Greek lyric poetry, perhaps referring to his linguistic and prosodic use of that material. He wrote prolifically in three genres: philological questions (γραμματικά); running commentaries (ὑπομνήματα) and treatises (συνταγματικά). Of the last genre, he wrote a polemical monograph criticizing the Homeric interpretations of Krates. Another work he is said to have written was the Περὶ ποσοτήτων (On quantities). From the scholia (Note: There are extensive scholia to the Techne, which have been edited by A. Hilgard in 1901: Scholia in Dionysii Thracis Artem Grammaticam, recensuit et apparatum criticum indicesque adiecit Alfredus Hilgard, Lipsiae: in aedibus B.G. Teubneri 1901. The collections of scholia are the following: Prolegomena Vossiana (p. 1); Commentarius Melampodis seu Diomedis (p. 10); Commentarius Heliodori (p. 67); Scholiorum collectio Vaticana (p. 106); Scholiorum collectio Marciana (p. 292); Scholiorum collectio Londinensis (p. 442); Commentariolus Byzantinus (pp. 565–586).) preserved from the critical works of Aristonicus and Didymus who excerpted Dionysius' work it is clear that he was decidedly independent in his textual judgements on the Homeric corpus, since he frequently contradicts his master's known readings. His teaching may have exercised a formative impact on the rise of Roman grammatical studies if as an entry in the Suda suggests, the elder Tyrannion was one of his pupils. The founder of classical scholarship in Rome, L. Aelius Stilo, may have profited from Dionysius' instruction, since he accompanied to Rhodes Q. Metellus Numidicus when the latter went into voluntary exile, and while Dionysius was still teaching there.

== Tékhnē grammatikē ==
Dionysius Thrax was credited traditionally as the author of the first extant grammar of Greek, Art of Grammar (Τέχνη γραμματική, Tékhnē grammatikē). The Greek text, in August Immanuel Bekker's edition, runs to fifty pages. (Note: Immanuel Bekker, Anecdota Graeca, Volume 2 Berlin 1816 pp 627–643) Its importance in Byzantine scholarship is attested by the fact that commentaries on it by Byzantine scholiasts run to some 600 pages. The text itself was thought to be the unique extant example of a work by Hellenistic scholars. This general consensus began to break down when examinations of grammatical texts datable to a later period emerged among the finds of the Oxyrhynchus Papyri which, until relatively late, showed no awareness of key elements in the text attributed to Dionysius Thrax. It concerns itself primarily with a morphological description of Greek, lacking any treatment of syntax. The work was translated into Armenian sometime around the 5th to 6th centuries AD, and into Syriac by Joseph Huzaya around that same period.

Dionysius defines grammar at the beginning of the Tékhnē as "the empirical knowledge of what is for the most part being said by poets and prose writers". He states that grammatikē, what we might nowadays call "literary criticism", (Note: Strictly speaking, "literary criticism" is more or less what the sixth section of the treatise, krisis poiēmatōn, deals with. That phrase was translated by Di Benedetto as "textual criticism" which however in classical Greek was called διόρθωσις (diorthōsis).) comprises six parts:

Grammatikḗ

- (a) ἀνάγνωσις ἐντριβὴς κατὰ προσῳδίαν (anagnōsis...): reading aloud with correct pronunciation, accent and punctuation.
- (b) ἐξήγησις κατὰ τοὺς ἐνυπάρχοντας ποιητικοὺς τρόπους (exēgēsis...): exposition of the tropes/τρόποι, the figurative language of texts.
- (c) ἀπόδοσις πρόχειρος γλωσσῶν τε καὶ ἰστοριῶν (apodosis...): common exposition of obsolete words and subject matter.
- (d) εὕρεσις ἐτυμολογίας (heuresis...): finding the correct meaning of words according to their origin (etymology).
- (e) ἐκλογισμὸς ἀναλογίας (eklogismos...): setting forth or considering analogies.
- (f) κρίσις ποιημάτων (krisis...): critical judgement of the works examined. (Note: Diorthōsis (διόρθωσις), literally "correction", indicates the scholarly work of "recension" of a text, that is, the establishment of the correct text by critical analysis and choice of specific readings. The ekdosis (ἔκδοσις) is the final result of such an operation.)

Paragraph 6 outlines the στοιχεῖα (stoikheia) or letters of the alphabet, together with the divisions into vowels, diphthongs and consonants.

Paragraphs 7–10 deal with syllables, long (μακραὶ συλλαβαί), short (βραχεῖαι συλλαβαί) and anceps (κοιναὶ συλλαβαί).

Paragraph 11 treats the eight-word classes, though strong doubts exist as to whether or not this division goes back to Dionysius Thrax, since ancient testimonies assert that he conflated proper nouns and appellatives, and classified the article together with pronouns. In the text attributed to Dionysius, the eight classes, which Di Benedetto and others argue was probably developed by Tryphon several decades after Dionysius, are as follows:

- (a) the 'name' (ὄνομα ónoma), translated as noun: a part of speech inflected for case. Its three genders: masculine (ἀρσενικόν), feminine (θηλυκόν) and neutral (οὐδέτερον) are distinguished, together with the five case endings. (Note: Classification according to gender was, fide Aristotle, the invention of Protagoras. He designated the neuter category by the word σκεῦoς (inanimate thing; σκεύη in NOM pl.), which Aristotle replaced by μεταξύ (in between), meaning neither male nor female, a terminology which was adopted in Stoic approaches, which however established οὐδέτερον as the default term.) He also notes however that two other terms are also in use: κοινόν (common) designating those words whose gender varies depending on the sex of the creature, such as ἵππος (hippos 'horse') and ἐπίκοινον (epicene) used to define words whose gender is stable, but which can refer to either sex, instancing χελιδών (khelidōn 'swallow'). The name includes various species like nouns, adjectives, proper nouns, appellatives, collectives, ordinals, numerals and more.
  - For example, the appellative (προσηγορία), which he considers a species (εἶδος) of the proper noun, not a distinct part of speech.
- (b) the verb (ῥῆμα) with its tenses.
- (c) the participle (μετοχή)
- (d) the article (ἄρθρον)
- (e) the pronoun (ἀντωνυμία)
- (f) the preposition (πρόθεσις)
- (g) the adverb (ἐπίρρημα)
- (h) the conjunction (σύνδεσμος)

Paragraphs 12-20 then elaborate successively on the parts of speech.

== Authorship ==
Modern scepticism over the attribution is associated with the pioneering work of Vincenzo Di Benedetto in particular, though as early as 1822 Karl Wilhelm Göttling, by analyzing the scholia on the text that had recently been collected and published by A. I. Bekker, concluded that the text as we have it was to be dated, not to the Hellenistic period but rather to the Byzantine period. Göttling's thesis convinced neither Moritz Schmidt nor Gustav Uhlig, and disappeared from view. In 1958/1959, Di Benedetto revived doubts by comparing the received text with ancient grammatical papyri that had since come to light. He argued that before the 3rd to 4th centuries AD, no papyri on Greek grammar reveal material structured in a way similar to the exposition we have in Dionysius's treatise, that the surviving witnesses for the period before that late date, namely authors such as Sextus Empiricus, Aelius Herodianus, Apollonius Dyscolus and Quintilian, fail to cite him, and that Dionysius's work only begins to receive explicit mention in the works written from the 5th century onwards by such scholars as Timotheus of Gaza, Ammonius Hermiae and Priscian. Di Benedetto concluded that only the first five paragraphs of the treatise came from Dionysius' hand.

Though initially rebuffed by scholars of the calibre of Pfeiffer and Hartmut Erbse, Di Benedetto's argument has found general acceptance today among specialists. It is now thought that most of the text was written in the 3rd or 4th century AD. The classical division into word classes that was thought to be seen first in Thrax was attributed by Di Benedetto to Tryphon, who worked slightly later than Dionysius in the 1st century BC, while new research suggests that it was used already by Aristarchus of Samothrace, who was active in the 2nd century BC.

== Sources ==
- Athenaeus (1933). Gulick, Charles Burton [in German] (ed.). Deipnosophistae. Vol. 5. Harvard University Press.
- Berglund, Carl Johan (2018). "Interpreting readers: the Role of Greco-Roman Education in Early Interpretation of New Testament Writings". In Wilk, Florian (ed.). Scriptural Interpretation at the Interface between Education and Religion: In Memory of Hans Conzelmann. Brill. pp. 204–246. ISBN 978-9-004-38569-6.
- Berrettoni, Pierangelo (2004). "On the Geometrical Background of Dionysius Thrax' Definition of Comparatives". In Petrilli, Raffaella; Gambarara, Daniele (eds.). Actualité des anciens sur la théorie du langage. Nodus Publications. pp. 17–36. ISBN 3-89323-314-8.
- Clackson, James Peter (1998) [First published 1995]. "The Technē in Armenian". In Law, Vivien; Sluiter, Ineke (eds.). Dionysius Thrax and the Technē Grammatikē. Munster: Nodus Publikationen. pp. 121–133. ISBN 3-89323-451-9.
- De Jonge, Casper Constantijn (2008). Between Grammar and Rhetoric: Dionysius of Halicarnassus on Language, Linguistics, and Literature. Brill. ISBN 978-9-004-16677-6.
- Di Benedetto, Vincenzo (1958–1959). "Dionisio Trace e la Techne a lui attribuita". Annali della Scuola Normale Superiore di Pisa. 62/28: 169–210, 87–118.
- Di Benedetto, Vincenzo (1990). "At the Origins of Greek Grammar". Glotta. 68: 19–39.
- Di Benedetto, Vincenzo (2007). Il richiamo del testo. Contributi di filologia e letteratura. Vol. 2. Edizioni ETS. pp. 381–461. ISBN 978-8-846-71940-9. Archived from the original on 2 April 2019.
- Ildefonse, Frédérique (1997). La Naissance de la Grammaire dans l'Antiquité grecque. Paris: Vrin. ISBN 2-7116-1311-9.
- Janko, Richard (1995). "Crates Mallos, Dionysius Thrax and the Tradition of Stoic Grammatical Theory". In Ayres, L. (ed.). The Passionate Intellect. Essays on the Transformation of Classical Traditions Presented to Prof. I. G. Kidd. Rutgers University Press. pp. 213–233. ISBN 9781412830539.
- Kemp, J. Alan, ed. (1986). "The Tekhne Grammatike of Dionysius Thrax". Historiographia Linguistica. 13 (2/3): 343–363. doi:10.1075/hl.13.2-3.12kem.
- Lallot, Jean (2003) [First published 1998]. La grammaire de Denys le Thrace (2nd ed.). Paris: CNRS Éditions.
- Michael, Ian (2010). English Grammatical Categories: And the Tradition to 1800. Cambridge University Press. ISBN 978-0-521-14326-4.
- Pagani, Lara (2014). "Techne Grammatike e la documentazione papiracea". Rivista di Filologia e di Istruzione Classica. 142: 205–217. doi:10.1484/J.RFIC.5.123263.
- Pfeiffer, Rudolf (1968). History of classical scholarship from the beginnings to the end of the Hellenistic age. Vol. 1. Clarendon Press. ISBN 9780198143420.
- Robertson, David (2008) [First published 1903]. Word and Meaning in Ancient Alexandria: Theories of Language from Philo to Plotinus. Ashgate Publishing. ISBN 978-0-754-60696-3.
- Robins, Robert Henry (1987). "The Tekhne grammatike of Dionysius Thrax in its Historical Perspective: The Evolution of the Traditional European Word Class System". In Swiggers, Pierre; van Hoecke, Willy (eds.). Mots et parties du discours. Leuven: Leuven University Press. pp. 9–37.
- Robins, Robert Henry (1998) [First published 1995]. "The Authenticity of the Technē". In Law, Vivien; Sluiter, Ineke (eds.). Dionysius Thrax and the Technē Grammatikē. Munster: Nodus Publikationen. pp. 13–26. ISBN 3-89323-451-9.
- Sandys, John Edwin (2010) [First published 1903]. A History of Classical Scholarship: From the End of the Sixth Century B.C. to the End of the Middle Ages. Cambridge University Press. ISBN 978-1-108-02706-9.
- Schironi, Francesca (2018). The Best of the Grammarians: Aristarchus of Samothrace on the Iliad. University of Michigan Press. ISBN 978-0-472-13076-4.
- Škiljan, Dubravko (2000). "The Amnesic Syndromes of Structuralism". In Tomić, Olga Mišeska; Radovanović, Milorad (eds.). History and Perspectives of Language Study: Papers in Honor of Ranko Bugarski. John Benjamins Publishing. pp. 85–99. ISBN 978-9-027-23692-0.
