= Adalbert Merx =

German theologian and orientalist

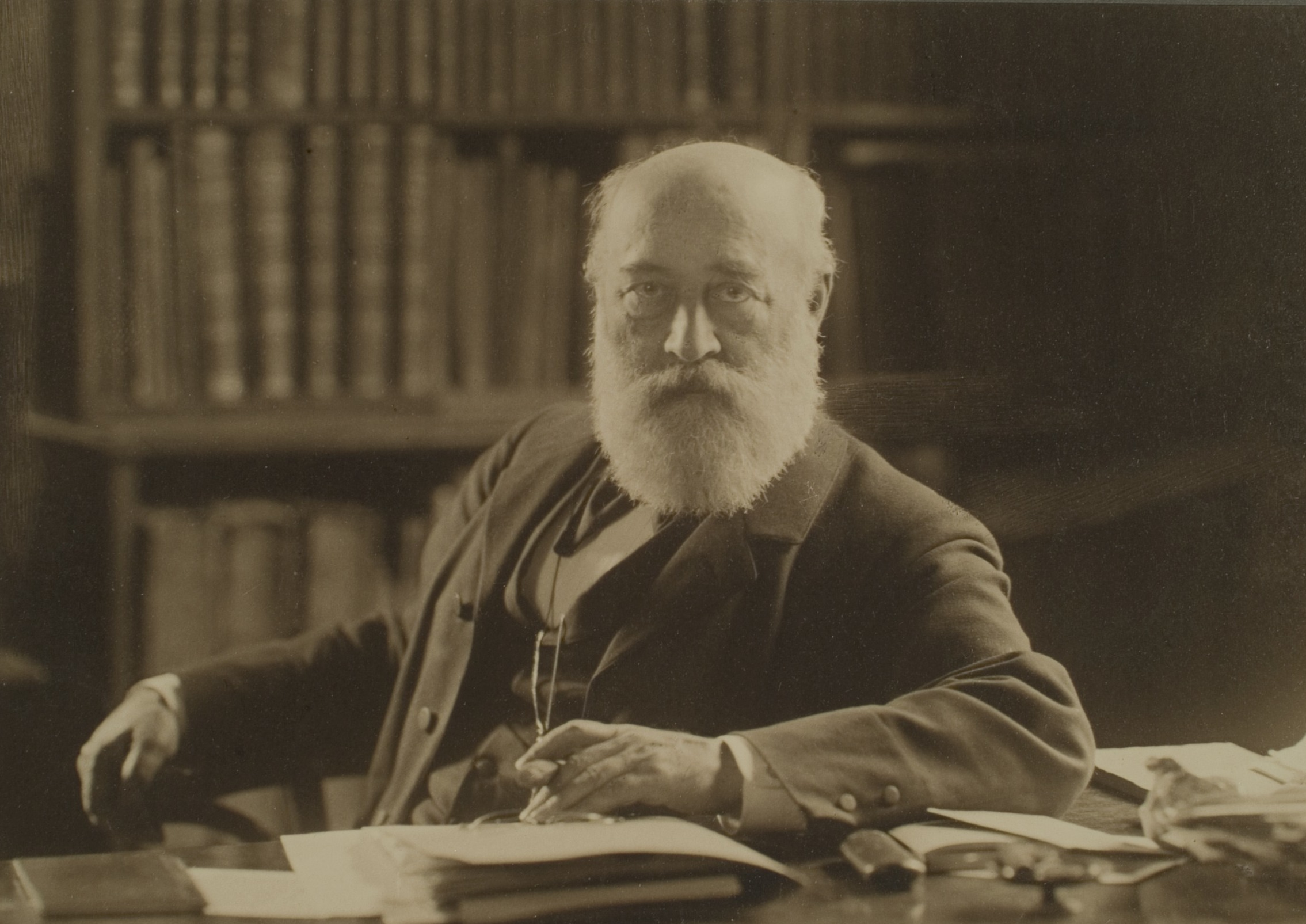
- Born: November 2, 1838; Bleicherode, Kingdom of Prussia
- Died: August 6, 1909 (aged 70); Heidelberg, Kingdom of Prussia
- Education: University of Jena
- Theological work
- Language: German

Adalbert Merx (2 November 1838 – 6 August 1909) was a German Protestant theologian and orientalist.

== Biography ==
He studied at the University of Jena, where he became an associate professor in 1869. Subsequently, he was a full professor of philosophy at the University of Tübingen, and in 1873 a professor of theology at the University of Giessen. From 1875 till his death he was a professor of theology of the University of Heidelberg. In the course of his researches he made several journeys in the East.

Merx devoted much of his later research to the elucidation of the Sinaitic Palimpsest discovered in 1892 by Mrs. Agnes Smith Lewis, the results (Die Evangelien des Markus und Lukas nach der Syrischen im Sinaikloster gefundenen Palimpsesthandschrift) being embodied in Die vier kanonischen Evangelien nach dem ältesten bekannten Texte (4 volumes, 1897–1905). His last work was an edition of the books of Moses and Joshua.

== Works ==
Among his many works are:

- Grammatica syriaca (1867–1870)
- Vocabulary of the Tigre language Written down by Moritz von Beurmann, published with a grammatical sketch by Adalbert Merx (1868).
- Das Gedicht vom Hiob (1871)
- Die Prophetie des Joel und ihre Ausleger (1879)
- Die Saadjanische Übersetzung der Hohe Liedes ins Arabische (1882)
- Dionysii Thracis ars grammatica, qualem exemplaria vetustissima exhibent (with Gustav Uhlig, 1883) – an edition of Dionysius Thrax.
- Chrestomathia Targumica (1888)
- Historia artis grammaticae apud Syros (1889)
- Ein samaritanisches Fragment (1893)
- Idee und Grundlinien einer allgemeiner Geschichte der Mystik (1893)
- Die Bücher Moses und Josua; eine Einführung für Laien (1907)
- Der Messias oder Ta'eb der Samaritaner, nach bisher unbekannten Quellen (1909)
