= Znamenny Musical Notation =

- Range: U+1CF00..U+1CFCF (208 code points)
- Plane: SMP
- Scripts: Common (116 char.); Inherited (69 char.)
- Assigned: 185 code points
- Unused: 23 reserved code points

Unicode version history
- 14.0 (2021): 185 (+185)

Unicode documentation
- Code chart ∣ Web page

Znamenny Musical Notation is a Unicode block containing characters for Znamenny musical notation from Russia.

Few fonts support this block as of 2021. Ones that do and are free for personal use include the specialist fonts Mezenets Unicode, Slavonic 1.00 (non-commercial use only), Voskresensky and Smolensky, as well as Symbola 14.0.

== Block ==
Znamenny Musical Notation^{[1]}^{[2]} Official Unicode Consortium code chart (PDF)
	0	1	2	3	4	5	6	7	8	9	A	B	C	D	E	F
U+1CF0x	𜼀	𜼁	𜼂	𜼃	𜼄	𜼅	𜼆	𜼇	𜼈	𜼉	𜼊	𜼋	𜼌	𜼍	𜼎	𜼏
U+1CF1x	𜼐	𜼑	𜼒	𜼓	𜼔	𜼕	𜼖	𜼗	𜼘	𜼙	𜼚	𜼛	𜼜	𜼝	𜼞	𜼟
U+1CF2x	𜼠	𜼡	𜼢	𜼣	𜼤	𜼥	𜼦	𜼧	𜼨	𜼩	𜼪	𜼫	𜼬	𜼭		
U+1CF3x	𜼰	𜼱	𜼲	𜼳	𜼴	𜼵	𜼶	𜼷	𜼸	𜼹	𜼺	𜼻	𜼼	𜼽	𜼾	𜼿
U+1CF4x	𜽀	𜽁	𜽂	𜽃	𜽄	𜽅	𜽆									
U+1CF5x	𜽐	𜽑	𜽒	𜽓	𜽔	𜽕	𜽖	𜽗	𜽘	𜽙	𜽚	𜽛	𜽜	𜽝	𜽞	𜽟
U+1CF6x	𜽠	𜽡	𜽢	𜽣	𜽤	𜽥	𜽦	𜽧	𜽨	𜽩	𜽪	𜽫	𜽬	𜽭	𜽮	𜽯
U+1CF7x	𜽰	𜽱	𜽲	𜽳	𜽴	𜽵	𜽶	𜽷	𜽸	𜽹	𜽺	𜽻	𜽼	𜽽	𜽾	𜽿
U+1CF8x	𜾀	𜾁	𜾂	𜾃	𜾄	𜾅	𜾆	𜾇	𜾈	𜾉	𜾊	𜾋	𜾌	𜾍	𜾎	𜾏
U+1CF9x	𜾐	𜾑	𜾒	𜾓	𜾔	𜾕	𜾖	𜾗	𜾘	𜾙	𜾚	𜾛	𜾜	𜾝	𜾞	𜾟
U+1CFAx	𜾠	𜾡	𜾢	𜾣	𜾤	𜾥	𜾦	𜾧	𜾨	𜾩	𜾪	𜾫	𜾬	𜾭	𜾮	𜾯
U+1CFBx	𜾰	𜾱	𜾲	𜾳	𜾴	𜾵	𜾶	𜾷	𜾸	𜾹	𜾺	𜾻	𜾼	𜾽	𜾾	𜾿
U+1CFCx	𜿀	𜿁	𜿂	𜿃												
Notes: 1. As of Unicode version 16.0; 2. Grey areas indicate non-assigned code points

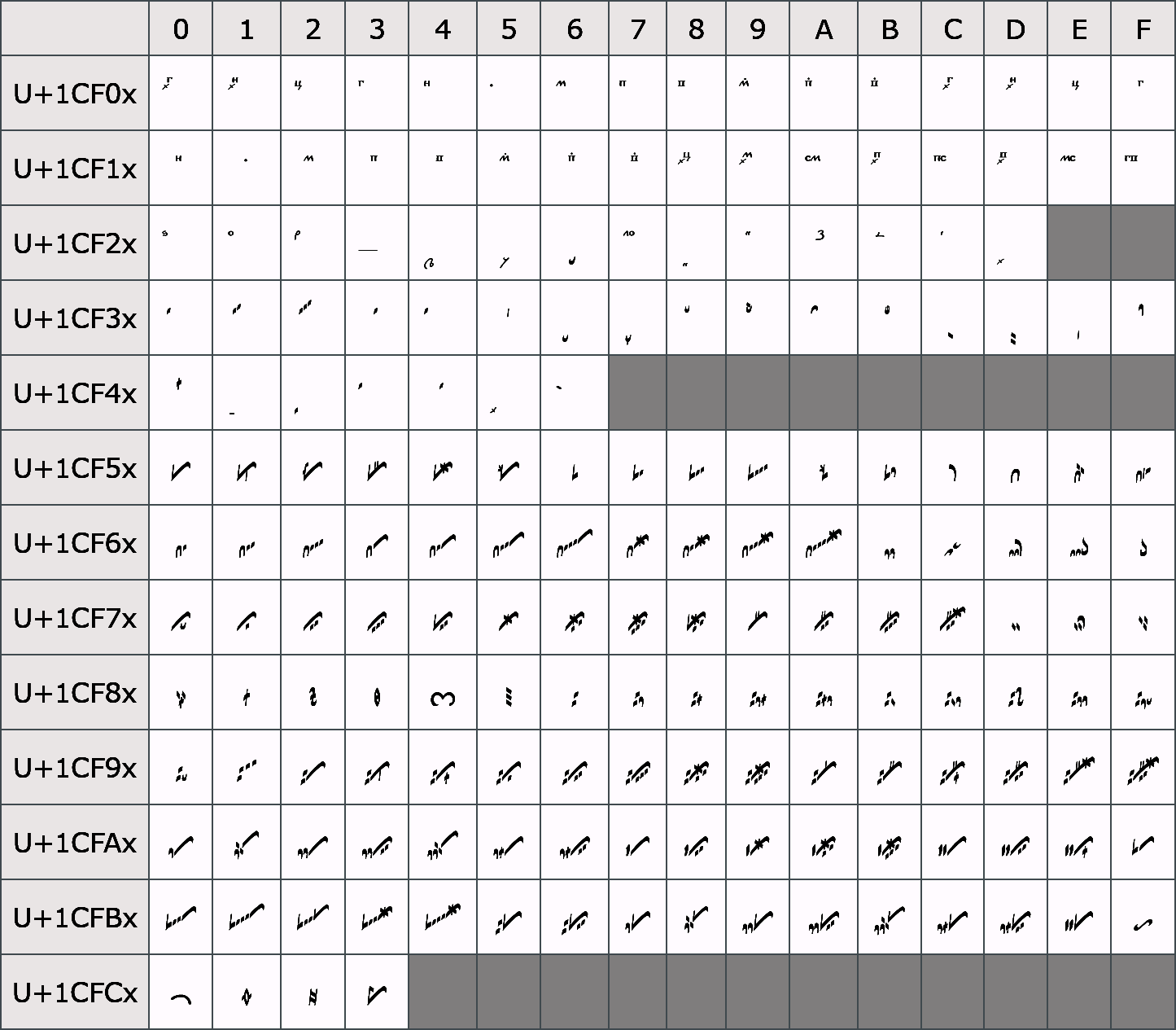
Preview of the Znamenny Musical Notation Unicode block for systems without a supporting typeface.

== History ==
The following Unicode-related documents record the purpose and process of defining specific characters in the Znamenny Musical Notation block:

Version	Final code points (Note: Proposed code points and characters names may differ from final code points and names)	Count	L2 ID	Document
14.0	U+1CF00..1CF2D, 1CF30..1CF46, 1CF50..1CFC3	185	L2/19-053	Andreev, Aleksandr; Simmons, Nikita (2019-04-17), Proposal to Encode Znamenny Musical Notation in Unicode (Preliminary and Incomplete)
14.0	U+1CF00..1CF2D, 1CF30..1CF46, 1CF50..1CFC3	185	L2/19-047	Anderson, Deborah; et al. (2019-01-13), "28. Znamenny Notation", Recommendations to UTC #158 January 2019 on Script Proposals
14.0	U+1CF00..1CF2D, 1CF30..1CF46, 1CF50..1CFC3	185	L2/19-286	Anderson, Deborah; Whistler, Ken; Pournader, Roozbeh; Moore, Lisa; Liang, Hai (2019-07-22), "18. Znamenny Musical Notation", Recommendations to UTC #160 July 2019 on Script Proposals
14.0	U+1CF00..1CF2D, 1CF30..1CF46, 1CF50..1CFC3	185	L2/19-270	Moore, Lisa (2019-10-07), "E.2", UTC #160 Minutes
14.0	U+1CF00..1CF2D, 1CF30..1CF46, 1CF50..1CFC3	185	L2/21-033R	Buff, Charlotte (2021-01-28), Canonical Combining Classes of Znamenny Notation Characters (revised)
14.0	U+1CF00..1CF2D, 1CF30..1CF46, 1CF50..1CFC3	185	L2/21-016R	Anderson, Deborah; Whistler, Ken; Pournader, Roozbeh; Moore, Lisa; Liang, Hai (2021-01-14), "28 CCC of Znamenny Notation Characters", Recommendations to UTC #166 January 2021 on Script Proposals
14.0	U+1CF00..1CF2D, 1CF30..1CF46, 1CF50..1CFC3	185	L2/21-009	Moore, Lisa (2021-01-27), "Consensus 166-C27", UTC #166 Minutes
14.0	U+1CF00..1CF2D, 1CF30..1CF46, 1CF50..1CFC3	185	L2/21-060	Andreev, Aleksandr (2021-03-07), Changes to the Znamenny Encoding Model Proposed during Alpha-Review
14.0	U+1CF00..1CF2D, 1CF30..1CF46, 1CF50..1CFC3	185	L2/21-073	Anderson, Deborah; Whistler, Ken; Pournader, Roozbeh; Moore, Lisa; Liang, Hai (2021-04-23), "17 Znamenny Musical Notation", Recommendations to UTC #167 April 2021 on Script Proposals
14.0	U+1CF00..1CF2D, 1CF30..1CF46, 1CF50..1CFC3	185	L2/21-066	Moore, Lisa (2021-05-05), "Consensus 167-C8", UTC #167 Minutes

== See also ==
- Ancient Greek Musical Notation (Unicode block)
- Byzantine Musical Symbols (Unicode block)
- Musical Symbols (Unicode block)
