= Moritz von Beurmann =

German explorer (1835-1863)

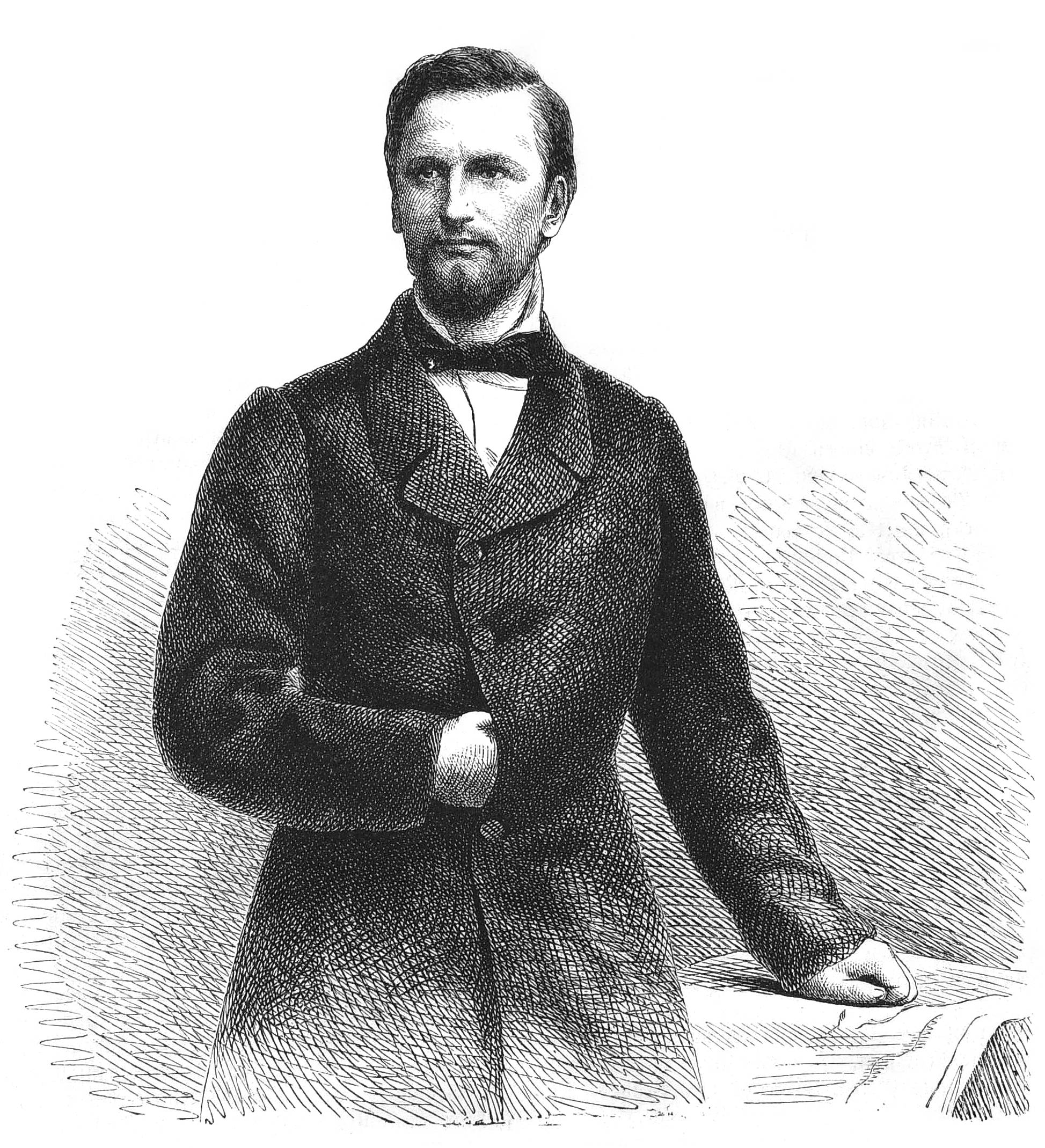
Moritz von Beurmann

Karl Moritz von Beurmann (born on 28 July 1835 in Potsdam – February 1863) was a German explorer. His father, also named Carl Moritz von Beurmann (1802–1870), was a Prussian government official.

He was trained in the Prussian military, becoming an officer in 1856. However, he soon became dissatisfied with military life, and within three years resigned his commission. In the meantime, he began learning Semitic languages with designs of traveling to lesser known regions of Africa. In 1860 he journeyed to northeastern Africa, where he explored the Nubian Desert and visited Kassala, Khartoum and the lands of the Bilen people. In 1861 he returned to Germany and published Reisen in Nubien und dem Sudan 1860 und 1861 ("Travels to Nubia and the Sudan in 1860/61") in Petermann's Geographische Mitteilungen.

After his return to Germany, he made plans for an expedition into the interior of Africa in order to ascertain the fate of the "lost" explorer Eduard Vogel. In February 1862 he traveled southward from the Libyan coast, then crossed the Sahara Desert, eventually reaching Kuka, the capital of the Bornu Empire, in early September. In February 1863 he was murdered in the village of Mao, possibly the result of orders given by the Sultan of Wadai.

Beurmann's glossary of the Tigre language was posthumously edited and published by Adalbert Merx as Vocabulary of the Tigré language (1868).
