= Alessandro Lami =

Italian classical philologist

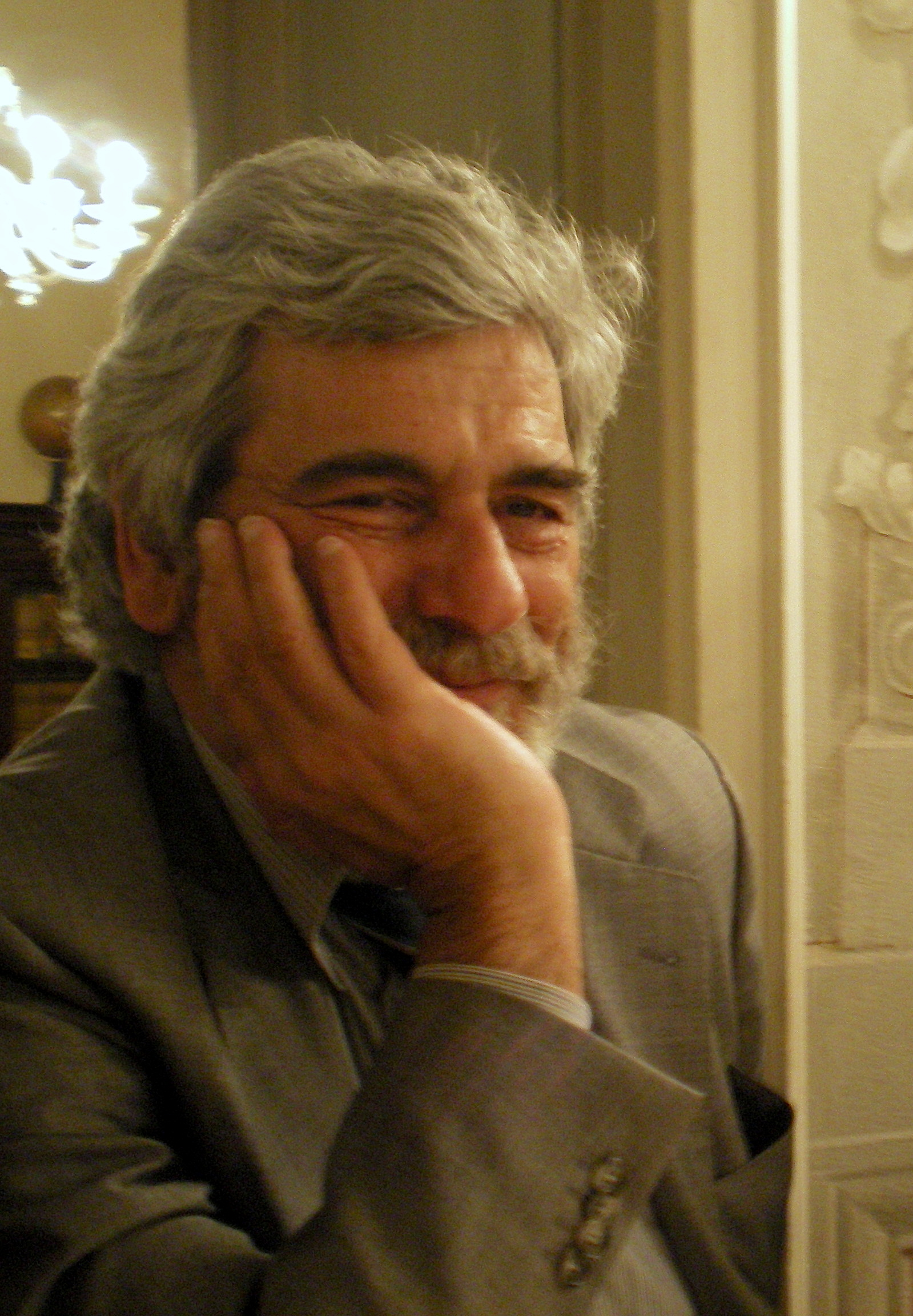
- Born: Alessandro Lami; 27 January 1949; Rosignano Marittimo, Italy
- Died: 8 March 2015 (aged 66); Livorno, Italy
- Occupation: Philologist
- Spouse: Elisabetta Piccioni
- Parent(s): Pietro Lami, Rina Colombini

Alessandro Lami (27 January 1949–8 March 2015) was an Italian classical philologist.

== Life ==
Born to the workman Pietro Lami and his wife Rina Colombini in Rosignano Marittimo, he grew up in Castiglioncello and was schooled in the knowledge of Latin and Classical Greek at the Liceo Classico "Niccolini Guerrazzi" in Livorno where he first met his wife, Elisabetta Piccioni.

Having received a scholarship from the Scuola Normale Superiore, he eventually finishes his studies at the University of Pisa, where his academic mentor is Vincenzo di Benedetto. There he teaches Greek Literature, first as an assistant professor, than as an associate professor.

He keeps up with his research until shortly before his death, collaborating with Galenos, a journal of philology of medical texts directed by his friend and coworker Ivan Garofalo.

He died in the morning of 8 March 2015 next to his wife.

His ashes rest in the Castiglioncello sea.

== Achievements ==
His areas of expertise included the history of Greek Philosophy, the history of Greek Medicine and Hippocratic Corpus. His work, with comment and translation, of the Galenic treatise De opinionibus propriis, is considered the best.
