= Leonensia =

Male student fraternity in Heidelberg

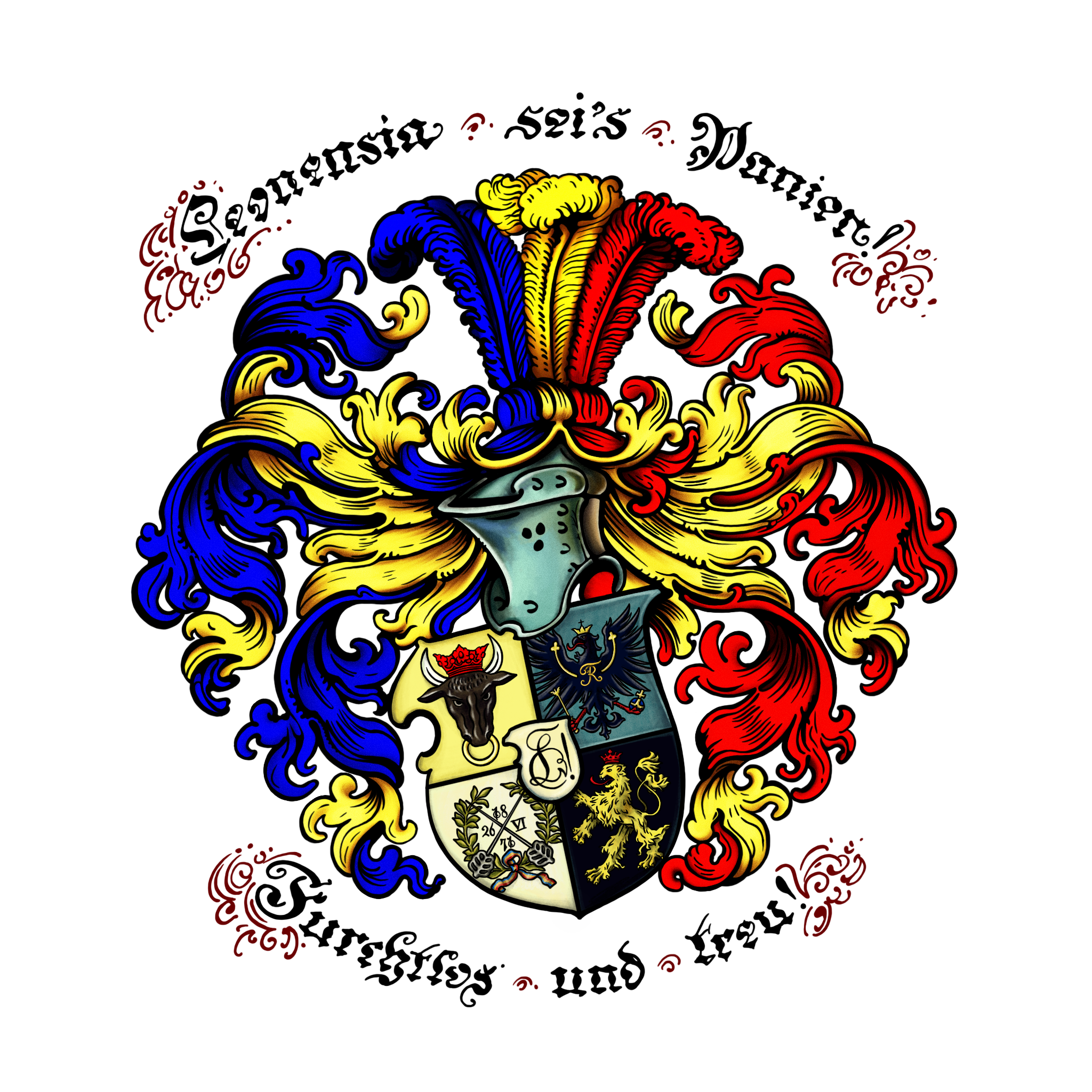
- Named after: Zum Goldenen Löwen (restaurant)
- Formation: 1871; refounded 1949
- Founded at: Heidelberg
- Location: Klingentorstraße 10, Heidelberg, Germany
- Members: Male students
- Official language: German
- Website: www.verbindung-leonensia.de

Leonensia is a male student fraternity (Studentenverbindung) in Heidelberg. Unlike most German fraternities, members wear no couleur and are not obliged to engage in academic fencing. It was founded in 1871 and ranks among Central Europe's oldest (AMV Stochdorphia Tübingen) non-couleur-wearing fraternities. In 1919, Leonensia and five other fraternities founded the umbrella organization Miltenberger Ring.

== History ==
=== German Empire, 1871–1918 ===
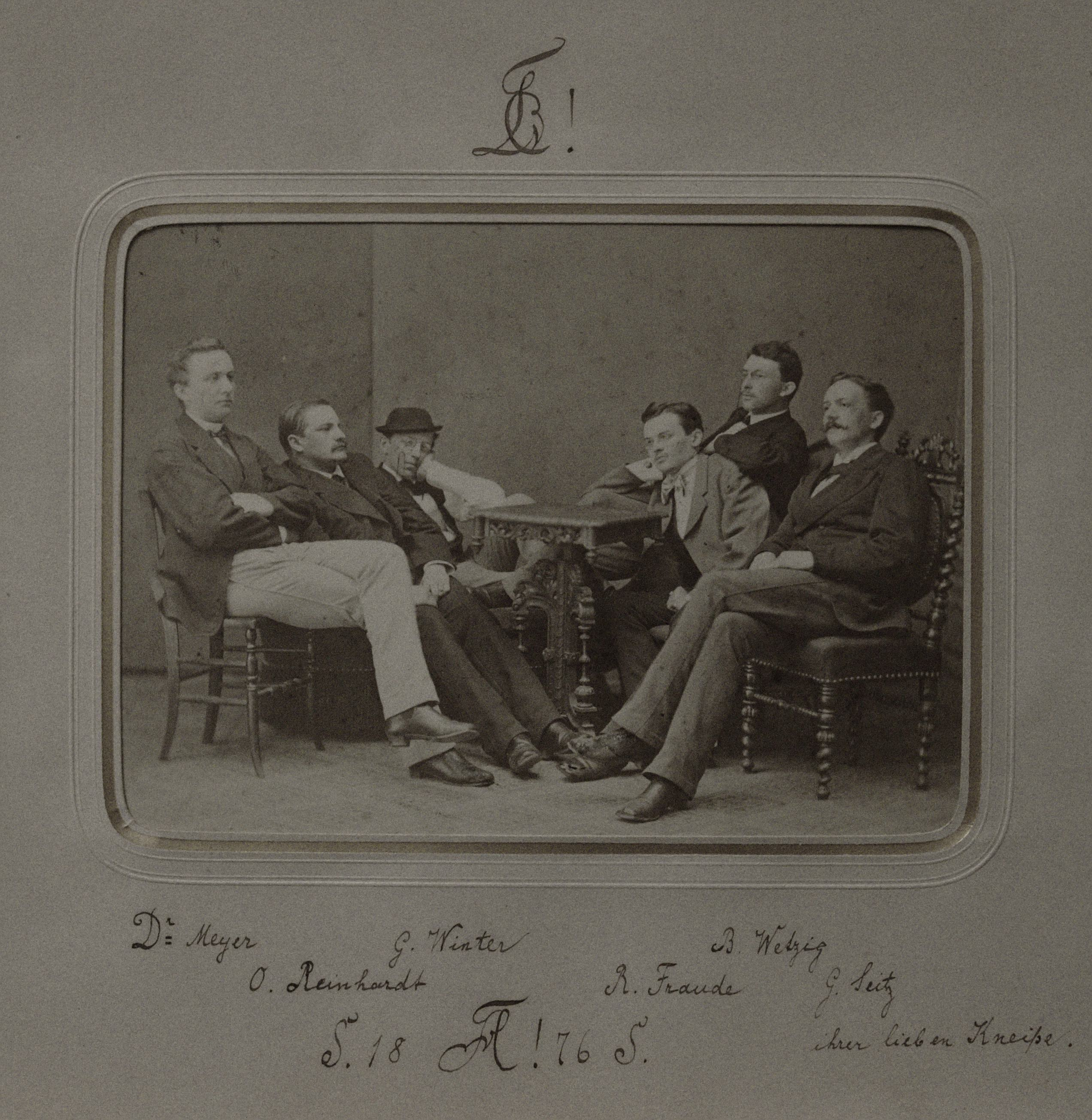
Senior members (Alter Herr) of Leonensia (1876)

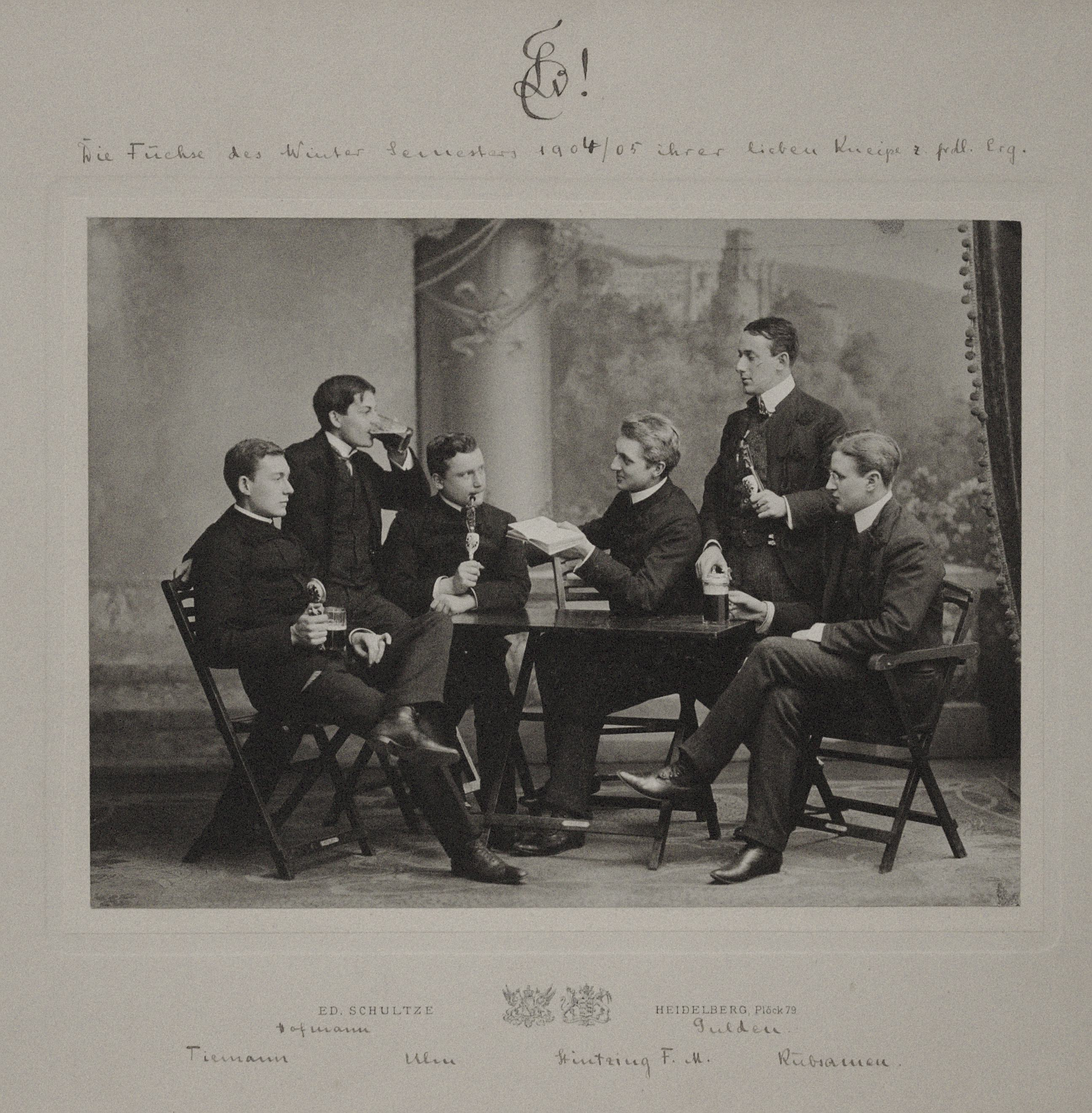
New members (Fuchs) of Leonensia sporting traditional jackets called Kneipjacke Pekesche (1904)

Shortly after the Franco-Prussian War, Leonensia was founded by students in the restaurant Zum Goldenen Löwen in Heidelberg. In the beginning, the "society" (Gesellschaft) had few rules, among them regulations (Bier-Comment) on how to properly consume vast amounts of beer during social gatherings (commercium). The creation of a Zirkel and of a fraternity hymn (commercium song) furthered the identity of the young society.

In 1878, Leonensia clashed with another fraternity, called Corps Vandalia. As both fraternities focussed on recruiting freshmen from Mecklenburg, Vandals challenged members of Leonensia to duels hoping to destroy the rival fraternity. Under this pressure, it was decided to amend the society's constitution so as to make it compulsory for members of Leonensia to give satisfaction where an offence had violated the honor of the challenging party. With this decision, Leonensia was able to adhere to the code of honor of fraternities in Heidelberg while protecting itself from frivolous mass challenges by Vandalia. A further amendment to the constitution outlawed the wearing of couleur for members of Leonesia. This decision was taken to distance Leonensia from couleur-wearing fraternities like Vandalia.

Historian Bernd Kasten describes Leonensia as the "most important civic student fraternity of Mecklenburg" (wichtigste bürgerliche Studentenverbindung für Mecklenburg) during the German Empire. Historian Martin Dröge confirms this assessment in a biography on Nazi politician Karl-Friedrich Kolbow: "If you wanted to start a career as a jurist in Mecklenburg, establishing contacts as an active member of Leonensia was essential." (Wer später in der mecklenburgischen Heimat als Jurist Karriere machen wollte, musste als aktiver Leonenser in Heidelberg die entsprechenden Kontakte geknüpft haben.)

The influence of Leonensia in Mecklenburg is borne out by the fact that its member, Adolf Langfeld, served as first minister of the Grand Duchy of Mecklenburg-Schwerin until the outbreak of the German Revolution of 1918–19. The flag of Leonensia is identical to the Grand Duchy. The upper right field of the Duchy's and Leonensia's coat of arms bears the head of a crowned bull.

=== Weimar Republic, 1918–1933 ===
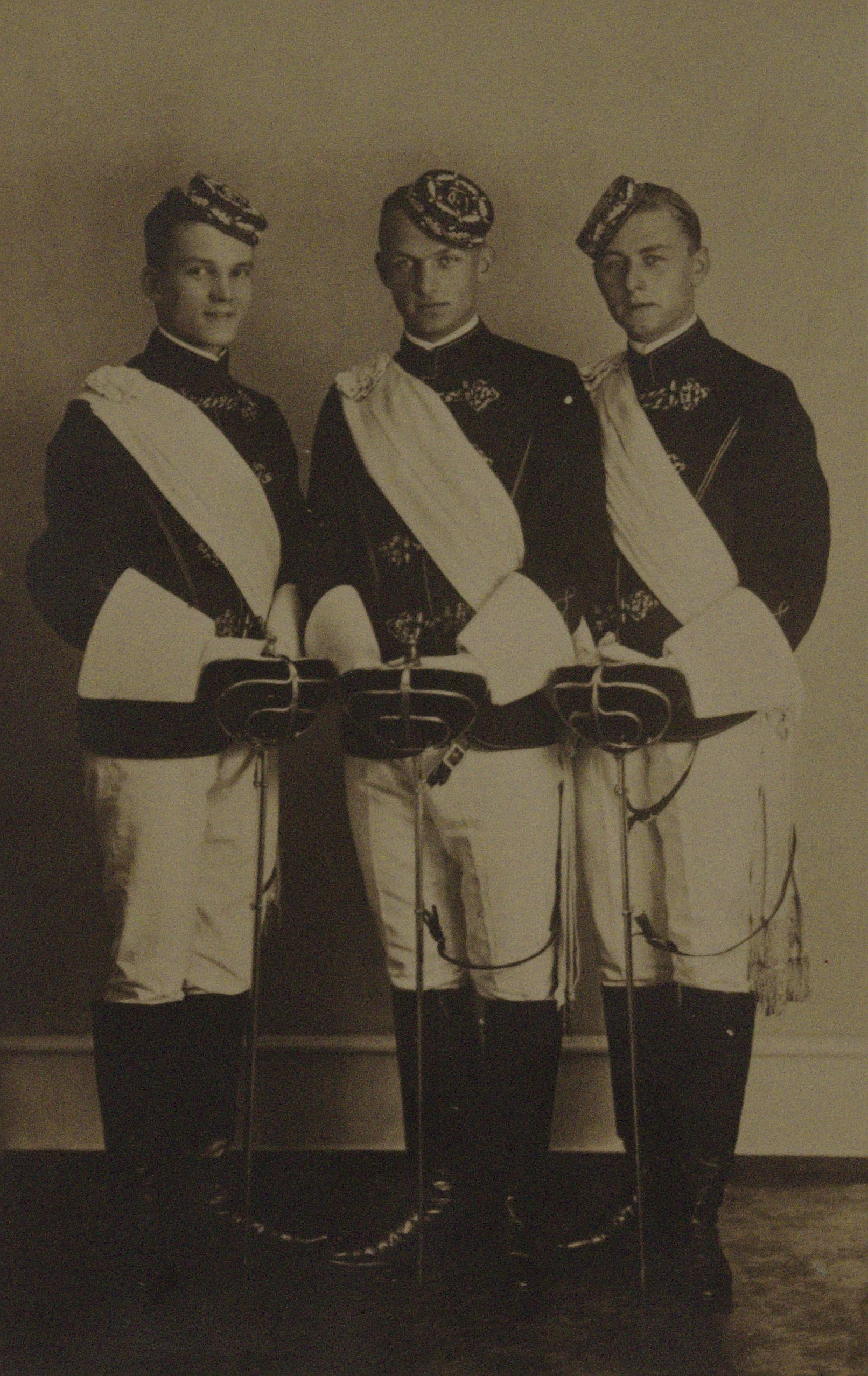
Charges of Leonensia sporting Wichs (1930)

Economic hardship of Weimar Germany took its toll on everyday fraternity life. Legal historian Björn Bertram writes about Leonensia's Hermann Krause that the fraternity could host tablerounds only twice a month. During the German Empire, in contrast, Leonensia used to host tablerounds at least twice a week.

Like most student fraternities, Leonensia took a critical stance towards the political order of the interwar period. In 1921, Carl Gernandt, then executive officer (Vorstandsmitglied) of Leonensia's association of senior members (Altherrenverein), condemned the international impotence of the Weimar Republic and called for revenge on France. In a speech during the fraternity's 50th anniversary, he said: "Now, as Germany is on her knees, we have to profess ourselves and so we commemorate her during all the great tablerounds singing patriotic songs while commemorating the God who made iron grow!" (Jetzt aber liegt Deutschland am Boden, jetzt heißt es bekennen und so gedenken wir seiner bei allen großen Kneipen, singen die vaterländischen Lieder, gedenken des Gottes, der Eisen wachsen ließ!)

=== National Socialism, 1933–1945 ===
During the Gleichschaltung, many student fraternities adopted National Socialist reforms to ward off suspension by the state. By July 1933, Leonensia's two main conventions decided to introduce the Führerprinzip. Senior member (Alter Herr) Friedrich Tischbein was elected Führer of the fraternity. As such, Tischbein could take binding decisions without being bound by instructions of the fraternity.

Student fraternities were problematic to the National Socialist state in three respects: First, a core tenet of fraternities is grassroots democracy. Jewish members were, often in theory only, entitled to loyalty by their fellow members. Finally, the student code of honor distinguished fraternities from the National Socialist ideal of a homogenous Volksgemeinschaft. Clashes with the Sturmabteilung in Göttingen and Heidelberg demonstrate the potential for conflict between National Socialism and some student fraternities.

By summer 1936, students had to join the National Socialist German Students' League or face exmatriculation. As league members, students had also to join suborganisations of the NSDAP (Sturmabteilung, Schutzstaffel, National Socialist Motor Corps, Hitler Youth etc.). On 14 May 1936, Hitler's deputy Rudolf Heß issued a decree outlawing simultaneous membership in a suborganization of the NSDAP and in a student fraternity. Two days later, the convention of Leonensia decided to suspend its student activities. The association of senior members (Altherrenverein), however, was not affected by this suspension. At this point, student fraternities were faced with the danger of potential extinction since they could no longer recruit new members. The National Socialist state encouraged former fraternities to turn into (Kameradschaften). A Kameradschaft was a militarized community of male students living together. The Führer of each Kameradschaft was appointed by the National Socialist German Students' League. On 18 September 1937, Leonensia's senior members decided with 101 against 87 votes to establish a Kameradschaft. 43 senior members, having voted against this decision, left the Leonensia. The Kameradschaft was dubbed after Heidelberg's romantic Achim von Arnim.

=== Allied Occupation, 1945–1949 ===
On 10 October 1945, the Allied Control Council disbanded all suborganisations of the NSDAP by decree (Kontrollratsgesetz Nr. 2). The Kameradschaft Achim von Armin, being itself a suborganisation of the National Socialist German Student's League, was subsequently disbanded. Leonensia's association of senior members was unaffected by the decree. US military seized the fraternity house and used it as an officer's mess. On 16 June 1948 Leonensia managed to host a tableround celebrating the fraternity's 77th anniversary.

=== Federal Republic of Germany, 1949–today ===
By June 1949, Heidelberg University returned the fraternity house to Leonensia. One year later, Leonensia already had ten active student members.

In July 1958, the convention of the senior member's association decided to abandon the principle of compulsory satisfaction which Leonensia had adopted 80 years earlier. Since then, members may choose whether they want to practice academic fencing.

Until 1968, it was custom for charges to sport a Wichs (ceremonial uniform) on highly official occasions. This custom was abandoned by the younger generation when a memorial plaque, paying tribut to Leonensia's casualties of World War II, was to be inaugurated at the fraternity house.

== Fraternity house ==
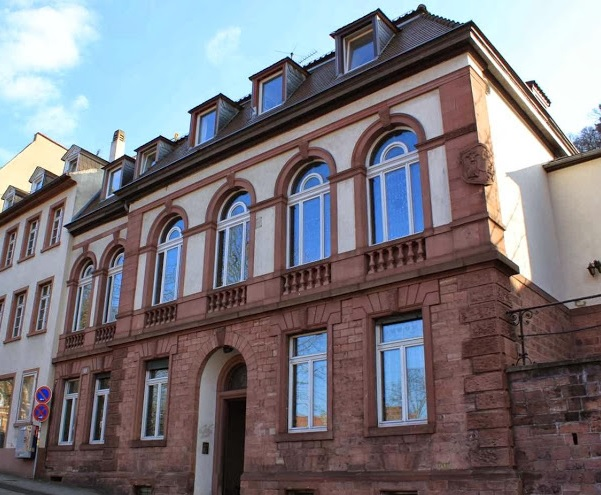
North facade (2014)

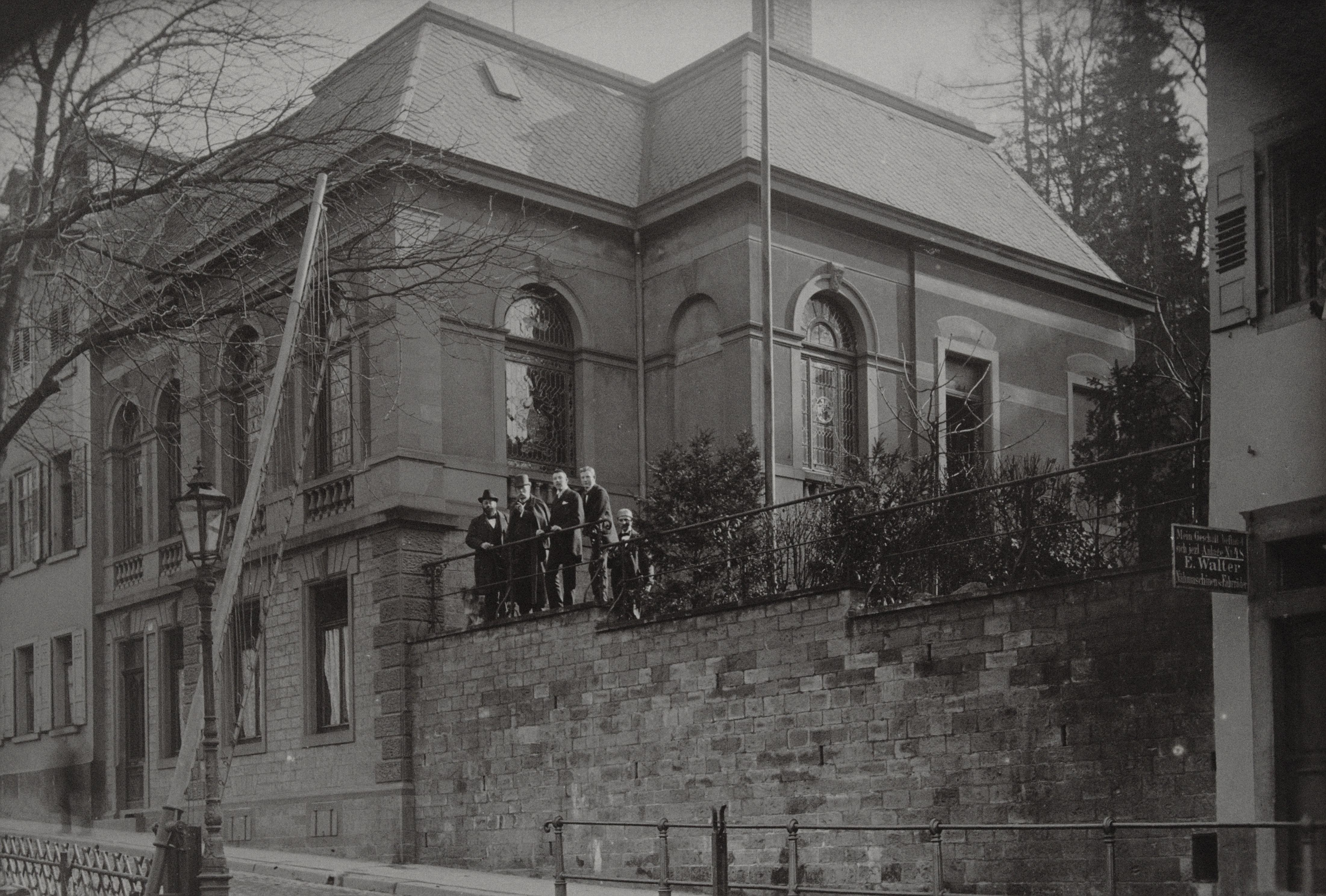
North facade (before 1907)

On 1 August 1891, the convention of senior members decided to build a fraternity house. The association of senior members bought property for 12,000 German gold mark in the old town of Heidelberg (Klingentorstrasse 10). Construction under architect Friedrich Müller totalled at 25,000 mark and was completed on 14 January 1893. In 1907, the Western part of the house was expanded under architect Frank Sales Kuhn.

After Germany's capitulation, US forces seized the house and used it as an officer's mess. Later, US authorities handed the house to Heidelberg University whose president Karl Geiler handed it back to Leonensia on 18 July 1949.

== Notable members ==
Photo	Name	Accession	Profession
	Paul Felisch	1873	Judge, writer
	Adolf Langfeld	1873	First minister of the Grand Duchy of Mecklenburg-Schwerin
alternativtext=	Friedrich Zelck	1881	Jurist, mayor
alternativtext=	Bernhard Kahle	1882	Philologist
	Hans Linck	1882	Jurist, member of Weimar Reichstag
	Adolf Frankede	1884	Electrical engineer
	Oscar Vulpius	1885	Orthopedis
	Emil Lemcke	1889	Jurist
	Wilhelm Zangemeister	1889	Gynecologist
	Franz Schieck	1890	Ophthalmologist
	Carl Uhlig	1890	Meteorologist, geographer
	Waldemar Gädecke	1893	Jurist
	Ulrich Gerhardt	1893	Zoologist
	Walther Schieck	1893	Prime minister of Saxony
	Franz Thorbecke	1894	Geographer
	Max Reich	1894	Physicist
	Hermann von Siemens	1904	Industrialist
	Paul Ramdohr	1909	Mineralogist
	Hermann Krause	1921	Legal historian
	Karl Heinz Fielitz	1928	Leading official at the ministry of economics in Rhineland-Palatine
