= Joseph Huzaya =

East Syriac teacher and author (fl. 530)

Joseph (Yawsep) Hūzāyā (fl. c. 530) was an East Syriac teacher and author. His name indicates that he hailed from Khuzestan.

Joseph was a disciple of Narsai. He was the maqryānā (reader) of the School of Nisibis at the end of the 5th and in the first half of the 6th century. His position involved the teaching of reading and interpretation. Later accounts make him the second director of the school, but this is an error.

According to a note on the last page (folio 312v) of the only surviving manuscript of the Nestorian Mašlmonutho (British Library, Add. 12138), Joseph invented the nine accents or points of Syriac ekphonetic notation. These punctuation marks indicate tone and rhythm for recitation. According to the Jacobite historian Bar Hebraeus, Joseph merely altered a preexisting system from Edessa into the one that prevailed in the Nestorian churches. The truth may lie somewhere between these interpretations. Joseph's system was in widespread use by 600.

Bar Hebraeus also records that Joseph wrote a work on homographs, which may have been the first in the history of the Syriac language. Since the Syriac alphabet is purely consonantal, homographs are words with the same consonants but different vowels and different meanings. According to the Nestorian manuscripts and the work of the Nestorian literary historian ʿAbdishoʿ bar Brikha, the Syriac translation of Dionysius Thrax's Art of Grammar was the work of Joseph. The Jacobite manuscript tradition, however, leaves the translation anonymous. This translation may better be called an adaptation. Joseph omits those part of the Art that are specific only to Greek (such as those on orthography and phonology), while adapting others (e.g., diathesis) with Syriac examples.

== Bibliography ==
- Becker, Adam H. (2006). Fear of God and the Beginning of Wisdom: The School of Nisibis and the Development of Scholastic Culture in Late Antique Mesopotamia. University of Pennsylvania Press.
- Farina, Margherita (2008). "Diathesis and Middle Voice in the Syriac Ancient Grammatical Tradition: The Translations and Adaptations of the Téchne Grammatiké and the Arabic Model". Aramaic Studies. 6 (2): 175–193. doi:10.1163/147783508X393039. S2CID 161176275.
- Juckel, Andreas (2018). "Masora". In Sebastian P. Brock; Aaron M. Butts; George A. Kiraz; Lucas Van Rompay (eds.). Gorgias Encyclopedic Dictionary of the Syriac Heritage: Electronic Edition. Beth Mardutho.
- Loopstra, Jonathan, ed. (2014). An East Syrian Manuscript of the Syriac 'Masora' Dated to 899 CE (Volume 1): A Facsimile Reproduction of British Library, Add. MS 12138. Gorgias Press.
- Loopstra, Jonathan, ed. (2015). An East Syrian Manuscript of the Syriac 'Masora' Dated to 899 CE (Volume 2): Introduction, List of Sample Texts, and Indices to Marginal Notes in British Library, Additional MS 12138. Gorgias Press.
- Loopstra, Jonathan (2019). "The Syriac Bible and its interpretation". In Daniel King (ed.). The Syriac World. Routledge. pp. 293–308.
- Segal, Judah B. (1953). The Diacritical Point and the Accents in Syriac. Oxford University Press.
- Van Rompay, Lucas (2018). "Yawsep Huzaya". In Sebastian P. Brock; Aaron M. Butts; George A. Kiraz; Lucas Van Rompay (eds.). Gorgias Encyclopedic Dictionary of the Syriac Heritage: Electronic Edition. Beth Mardutho.
- Vollandt, Ronny (2015). Arabic Versions of the Pentateuch: A Comparative Study of Jewish, Christian, and Muslim Sources. Brill.
