= Gustav Uhlig =

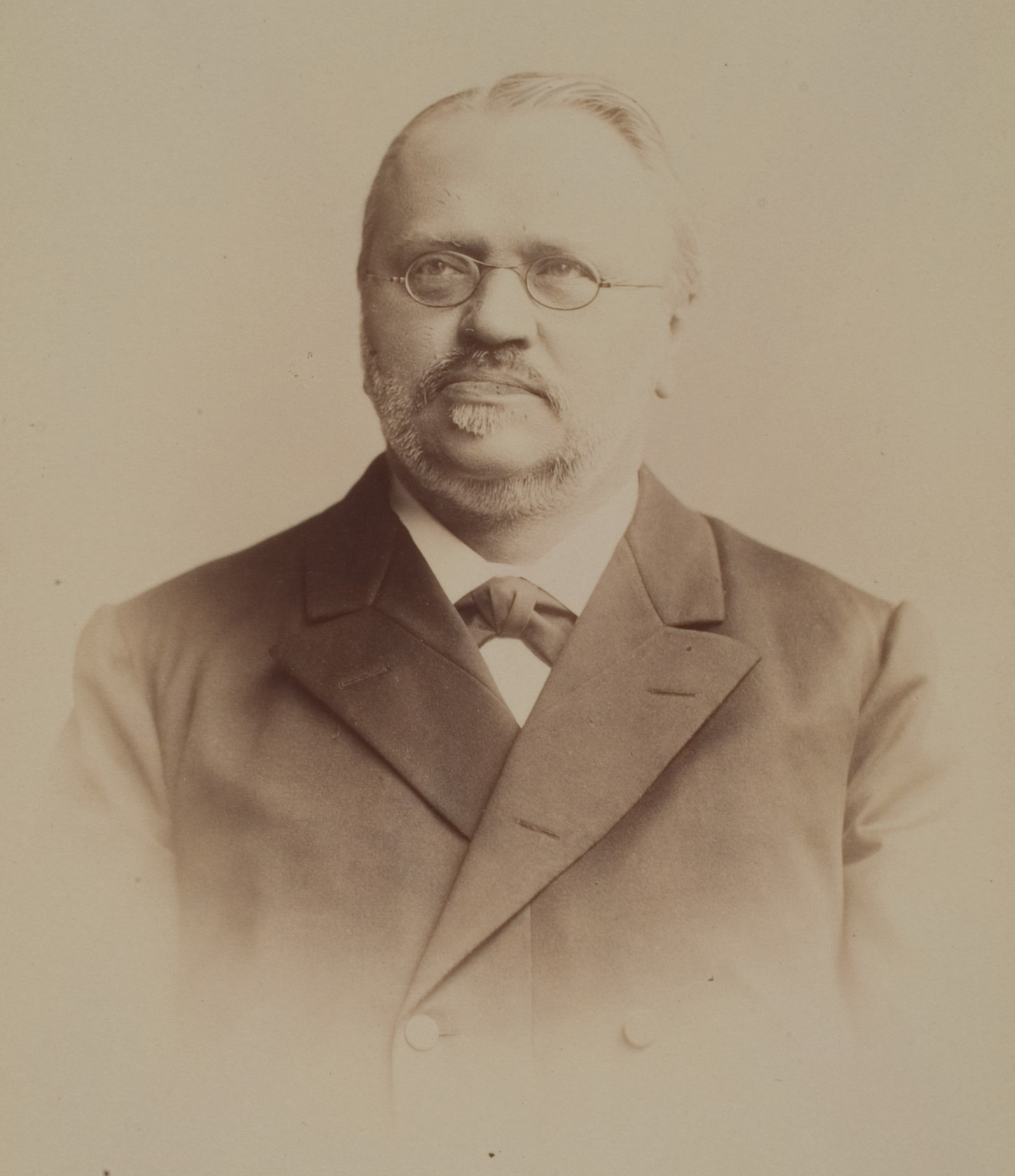
Gustav Uhlig (ca. 1900)

Gustav Uhlig (9 July 1838 in Gleiwitz – 14 June 1914 in Schmiedeberg im Riesengebirge) was a German educator and classical philologist. He was the father of geographer Carl Uhlig (1872–1938).

He studied classical philology at the universities of Bonn and Berlin, and from 1866 worked as a schoolteacher at the cantonal gymnasium in Aarau. In 1869 he became an associate professor of classical philology at the University of Zürich, then around 1872 was appointed a gymnasium director in Heidelberg, where he also became an honorary professor at the university. During his career, he traveled widely throughout Europe, taking educational trips to Italy (1869), Greece (1870), France, England, Holland (1874), Sweden, Norway (1887) and Denmark (1888).

== Published works ==
- Emendationum Apollonianarum specimen (dissertation, 1862).
- Zur Wiederherstellung des ältesten occidentalischen Compendiums der Grammatik, 1882 – To the restoration of the oldest Occidental compendiums of grammar.
- Dionysii Thracis ars grammatica, qualem exemplaria vetustissima exhibent (with Adalbert Merx, 1883) – edition of Dionysius Thrax.
- Die Stundenpläne für Gymnasien und Realgymnasien in den bedeutendsten Staaten Deutschlands (1883) – Timetables for schools and realgymnasiums in the more important states of Germany.
- Die Einheitsschule mit lateinlosem Unterbau (1892).
- Apollonii Dyscoli de constructione libri quattuor (1910) – edition of Apollonius Dyscolus.
- Die Entwicklung des Kampfes gegen das Gymnasium (1910).

From 1890 he was editor of the magazine Das Humanistische Gymnasium, a publication issued by the Deutscher Gymnasialverein (German Gymnasium Association).
