= Carl Uhlig =

German geographer and meteorologist

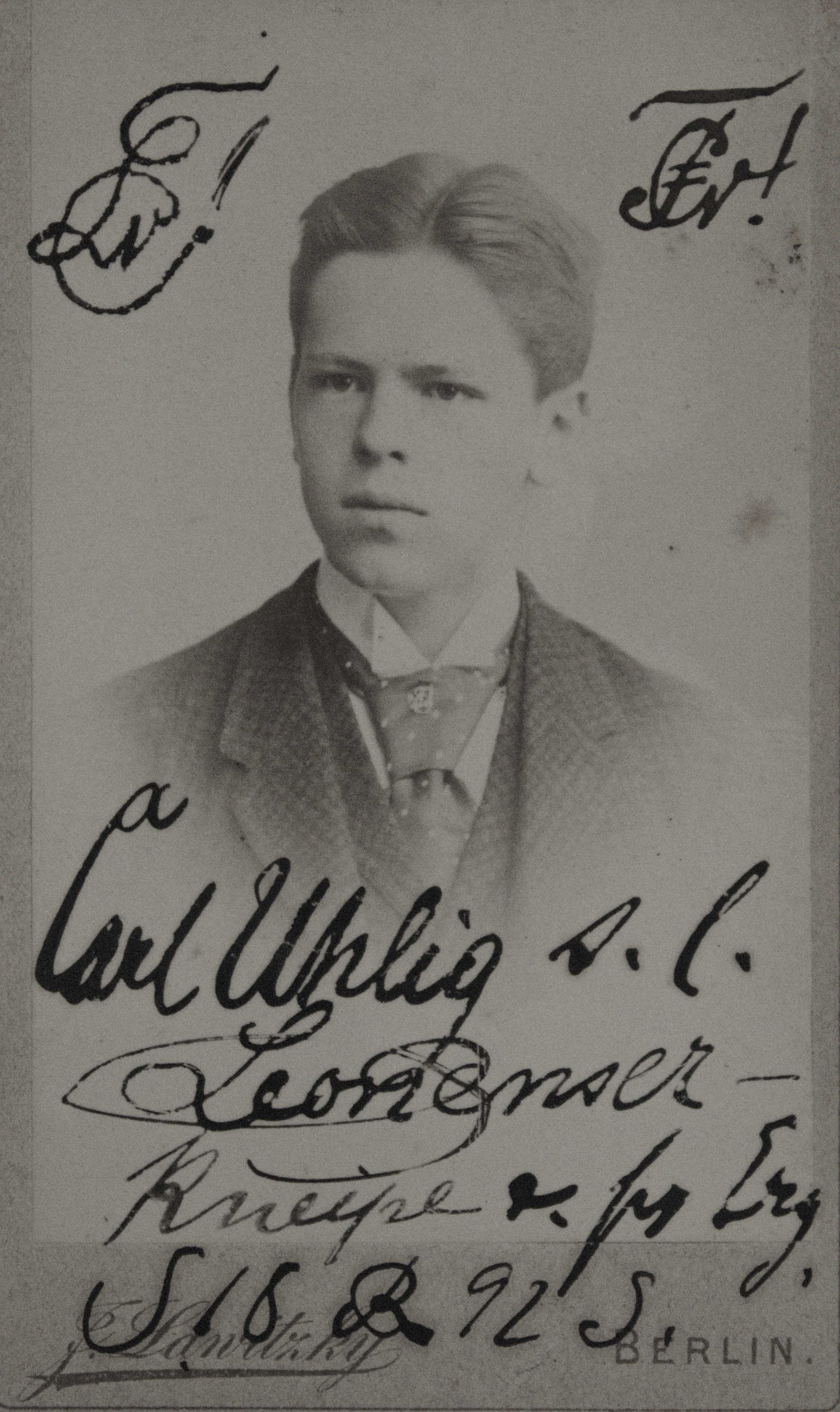
Carl Uhlig as a member of student fraternity Leonensia in Heidelberg (1890)

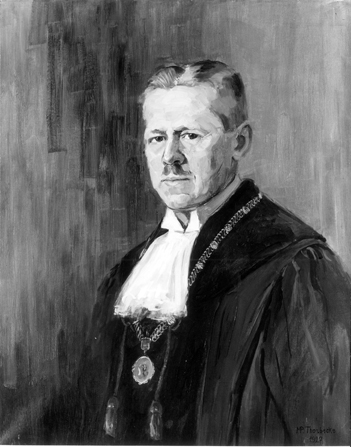
Carl Uhlig as professor of Tübingen University

Carl Ludwig Gustav Uhlig (29 August 1872, in Heidelberg – 12 September 1938, in Tübingen) was a German geographer and meteorologist. He was the son of philologist Gustav Uhlig (1838–1914).

He studied natural sciences at the universities of Heidelberg, Freiburg, Göttingen and Berlin, receiving his doctorate in 1897 with the thesis Die Veränderungen der Volksdichte im nördlichen Baden 1852–1895. In Heidelberg, Uhlig joined the German student fraternity Leonensia. From 1900 to 1906 he worked as a meteorologist and geographer for the government of German East Africa, during which time, he carried out investigations of Kilimanjaro and Mount Meru (1901) as well as scientific studies of Lake Victoria (1904). In 1903 he visited Egypt and in 1906 he conducted research in Transvaal and Cape Colony.

From 1907 he taught classes on the geography of German East Africa at the Seminar for Oriental languages in Berlin. In 1908 he obtained his habilitation, then in 1910 was named a full professor of geography at the University of Tübingen. In 1926/27 he was appointed university rector. In addition to his African studies, he also conducted geographical research in the United States, Palestine, Eastern Europe and Scandinavia.

The now vanished Uhlig glacier on Kilimanjaro was named after him.

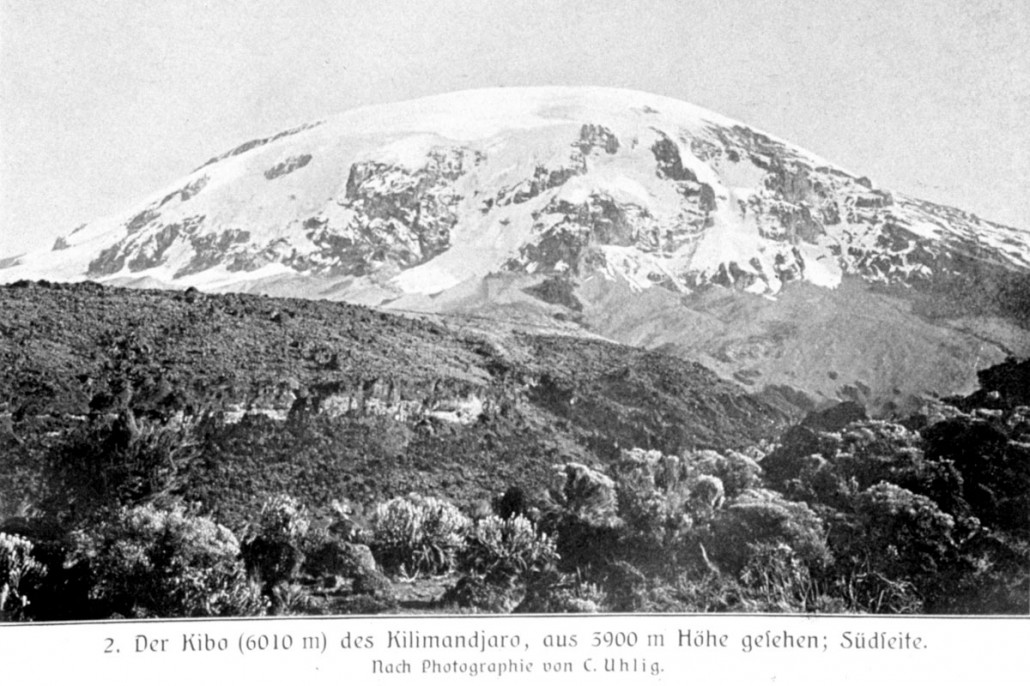
Kibo summit, (Kilimanjaro); photograph by Carl Uhlig

== Selected works ==
- Regenmessungen aus Usambara. Berlin 1903 – Rain measurements of Usambara.
- Wirtschaftskarte von Deutsch-Ostafrika. 1904 – Economic map of German East Africa.
- Die ostafrikanische Bruchstufe und die angrenzenden Gebiete zwischen den Seen Magad und Lawa ja Mweri sowie dem Westfuß des Meru. (with Fritz Jaeger): Leipzig 1909 – The East African fault scarp and adjacent areas, etc.
- Tübingen und Umgebung. Ein Beitrag zur Landeskunde des Gebietes, zugleich eine Erläuterung des Kartenbildes. Öhringen 1923 – Tübingen and surroundings. A contribution to the geography of the area.
- Süddeutschland von oben. Folge 1: Württemberg und Hohenzollern. (with Paul Strähle) Tübingen 1925 – Southern Germany from above; Württemberg and Hohenzollern.
- Die bessarabische Frage. Eine geopolitische Betrachtung. Breslau 1926 – The Bessarabian issue; a geopolitical consideration.
