= The Art of Grammar =

2nd century BCE, first treatise on Greek grammar, attributed to Dionysius Thrax

The Art of Grammar (Ancient Greek: Τέχνη Γραμματική Téchnē Grammatikḗ) is a treatise on Ancient Greek grammar, attributed to Dionysius Thrax, who wrote in the 2nd century BC.

== Contents ==
It is the first work on grammar in Greek, and also the first concerning a Western language. It sought mainly to help speakers of Koine Greek understand the language of Homer, and other great poets of the past. It has become a source for how ancient texts should be acted out based on the experience from commonly read ancient authors. There are six parts to understanding grammar including trained reading by understanding the dialect from certain poetical figures. There is a nine-part word classification system, which strayed away from the previous eight-part classification system. It describes morphological structure as containing no middle diathesis. There is no morphological analysis and the text uses the Word and Paradigm model.

== Translation ==
It was translated into Syriac by Joseph Huzaya of the school of Nisibis in the 6th century. It was also translated into Armenian.
