= Altomonte =

- Comune
- Comune di Altomonte
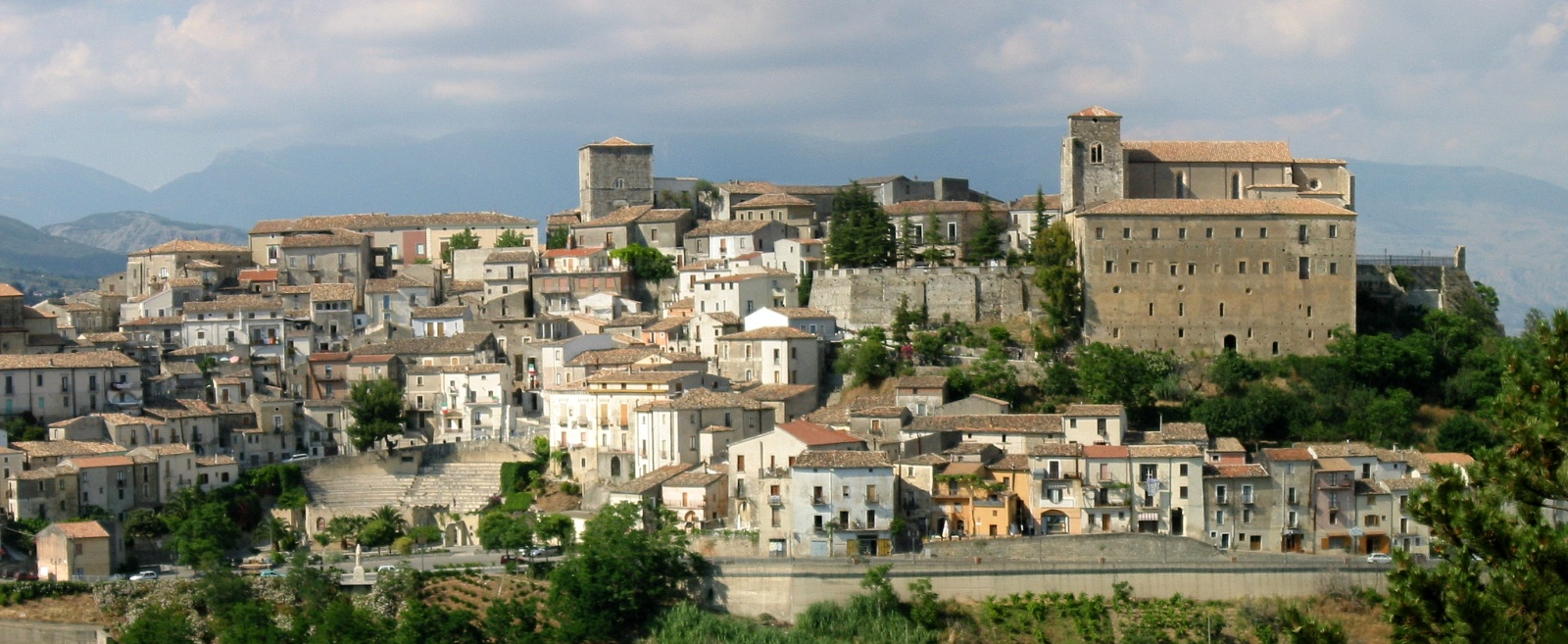

- Coat of arms

- Location within Italy Location within Calabria
- Coordinates: 39°42′N 16°8′E
- Country: Italy
- Region: Calabria
- Province: Cosenza (CS)
- Frazioni: Casello

Government
  - Mayor: Gianpietro Carlo Coppola

Area
  - Total: 65.72 km^{2} (25.37 sq mi)
- Elevation: 455 m (1,493 ft)

Population (30 April 2017)
  - Total: 4,427
  - Density: 67.36/km^{2} (174.5/sq mi)
- Demonym: Altomontesi
- Time zone: UTC+1 (CET)
  - Summer (DST): UTC+2 (CEST)
- Postal code: 87042
- Dialing code: 0981
- Patron saint: St. Francis
- Saint day: 2 April
- Website: Official website

Altomonte is a town and comune in the province of Cosenza, in the Calabria region of southern Italy. It is one of I Borghi più belli d'Italia ("The most beautiful villages of Italy").

== People ==
- Vincenzo Di Benedetto, classical philologist

== Twin towns ==
- Vigarano Mainarda, Italy
