= Ekphonetic notation =

Mnemonic symbols in sacred texts

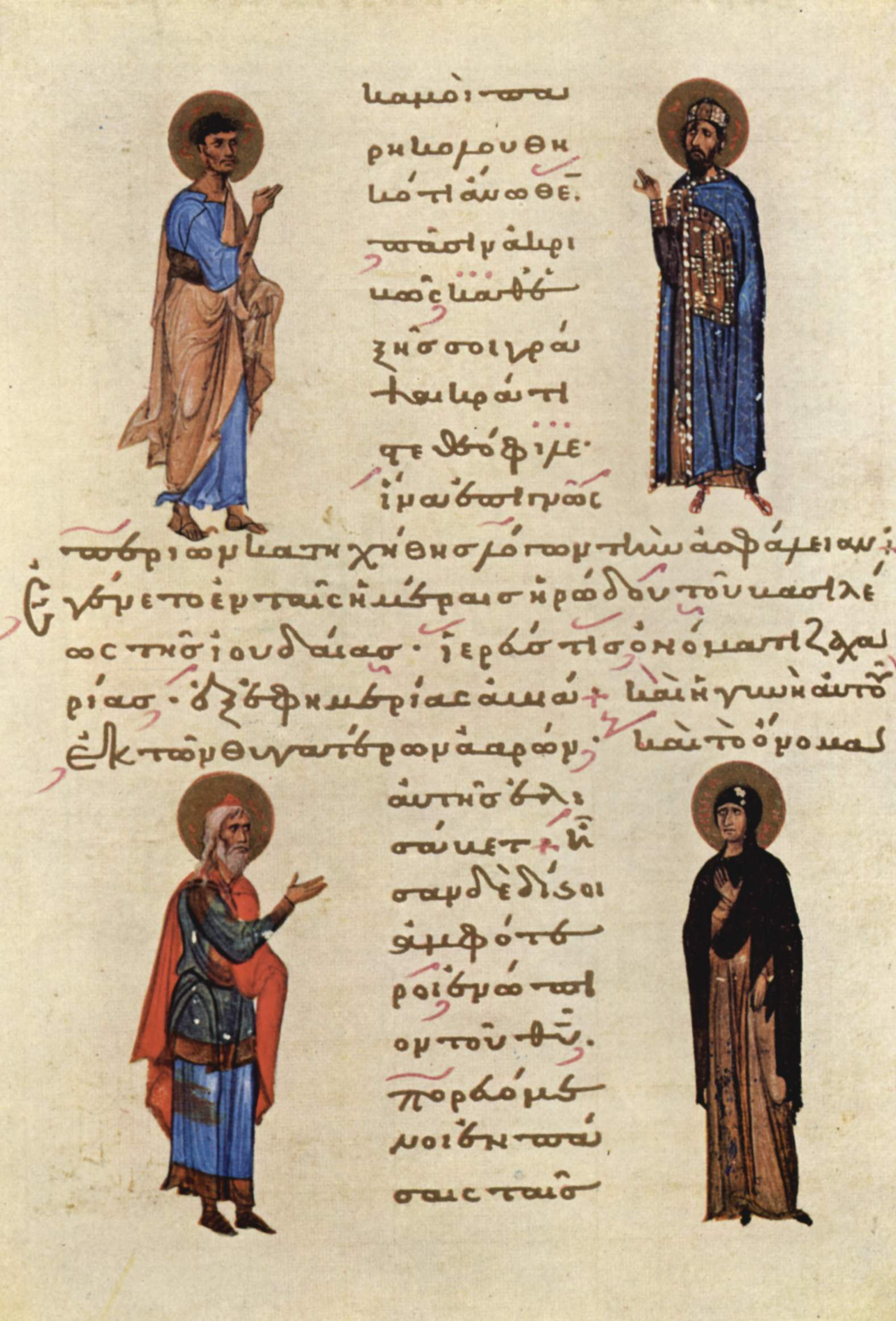
An example of polytonic text with Ekphonetic neumes in red ink from a Byzantine manuscript, of 1020 AD, displaying the beginning of the Gospel of Luke (1:3–6)

Ekphonetic notation consists of symbols added to certain sacred texts, especially lectionary readings of Biblical texts, as a mnemonic device to assist in their cantillation. Ekphonetic notation can take a number of forms, and has been used in several Jewish and Christian plainchant traditions, but is most commonly associated with Byzantine chant.

Joseph Huzaya introduced ekphonetic notation into Syriac in the early 6th century.

Ekphonetic notation ceased to be used about the fourteenth century. In many cases, the original meaning of ekphonetic neumes is obscure, and must be reconstructed by comparison with later notation.

== See also ==
- Hebrew cantillation
