= Ineke Sluiter =

Ineke Sluiter FBA
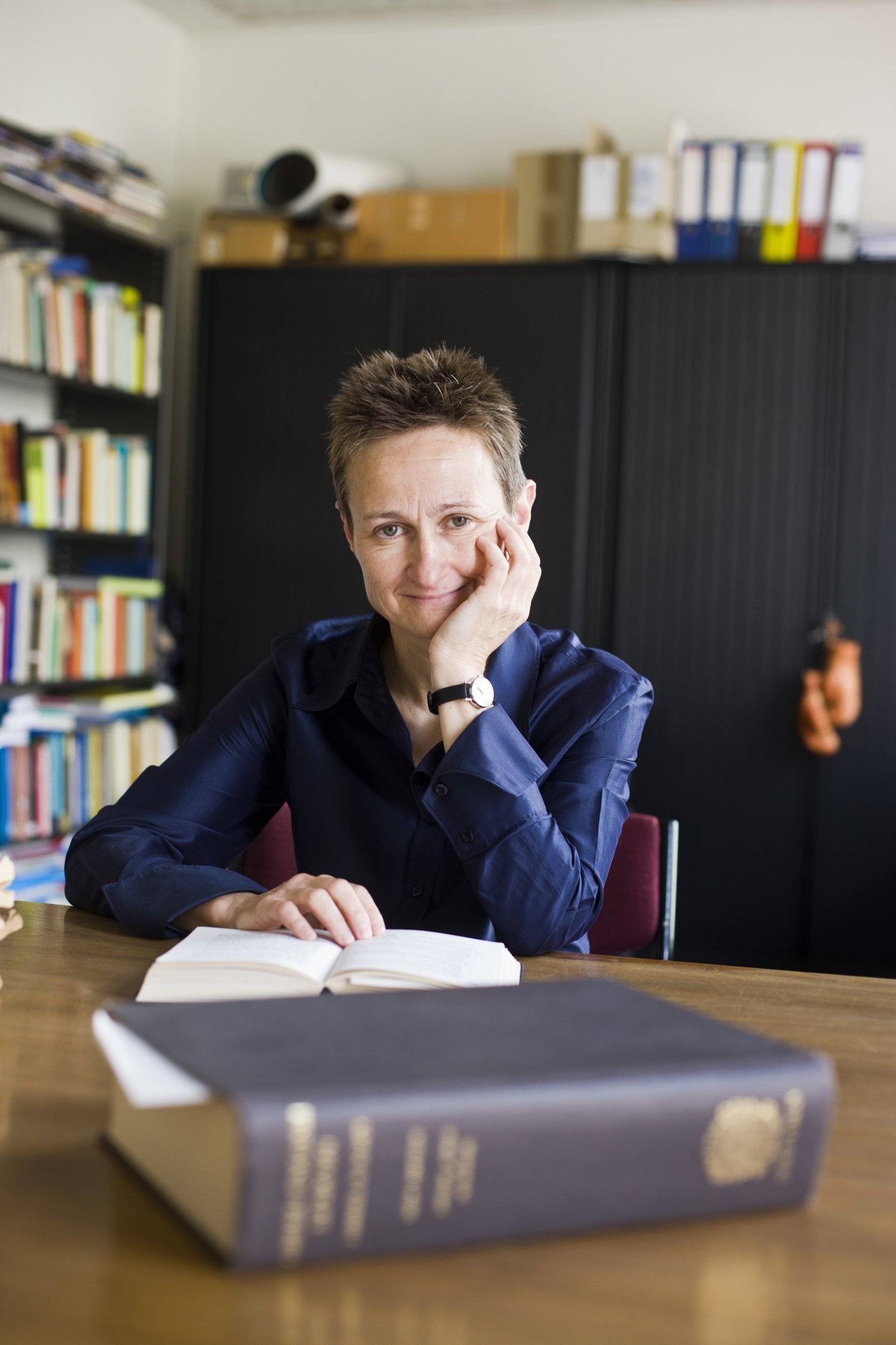
- Ineke Sluiter (2010)
- Born: 13 November 1959 (age 66); Amsterdam, Netherlands
- Occupation: Classicist
- Awards: Spinoza Prize (2010); Arts and Sciences Medal of Honour (2024)

Academic background
- Education: Vrije Universiteit Amsterdam
- Thesis: Ancient grammar in context. Contributions to the study of ancient linguistic thought (1990)

Academic work
- Institutions: Leiden University

Ineke Sluiter FBA (born 13 November 1959) is a Dutch classicist and professor of Greek language and literature at Leiden University since 1998. Her research focuses on language, literature, and public discourse in classical antiquity. She was a winner of the 2010 Spinoza Prize and was awarded the Arts and Sciences Medal of Honour in 2024. Sluiter served as president of the Royal Netherlands Academy of Arts and Sciences between 2020 and 2022.

== Career ==
Sluiter was born in Amsterdam on 13 November 1959. She studied Greek and Latin language and culture at the Vrije Universiteit Amsterdam and graduated in 1984. Sluiter obtained her doctorate cum laude from the same university in 1990. Her dissertation was entitled Ancient grammar in context. Contributions to the study of ancient linguistic thought. Between 1984 and 1997 she was a lecturer and researcher at the Vrije Universiteit Amsterdam. She completed a post-doctoral fellowship from the Royal Netherlands Academy of Arts and Sciences, she was a Junior Fellow at Harvard's Center for Hellenic Studies (Washington DC, 1994/5) and spent a year at the Institute for Advanced Study (Princeton, 1996/7). In 1998 she became professor of Greek Language and Literature at Leiden University. From 2000 to 2011, she was the academic director of OIKOS, the National Research School in Classical Studies in the Netherlands. She was one of the founders and continues to be the academic director of the national Anchoring Innovation programme, the Gravitation Grant research agenda of OIKOS that is financially supported by the Dutch Ministry of Education, Culture, and Science (2017–2027). From 2007 to 2011, Sluiter served as Chair of the Board for the Humanities of the Netherlands Organisation for Scientific Research.

In 2010 she was one of four winners of the Dutch Spinoza Prize and received a 2.5 million euro grant from the Netherlands Organisation for Scientific Research to be spent on new research.

Sluiter has been a member of the Royal Netherlands Academy of Arts and Sciences (KNAW) since 2012. In 2013 she was elected a member of Academia Europaea. In 2016 Sluiter won the KNAW Academy Professor Prize, the other winner was Hans Clevers. In July 2017 she was elected a Corresponding Fellow of the British Academy, the United Kingdom's national academy for the humanities and social sciences. In 2018, Sluiter was elected as vice-president of the Royal Netherlands Academy of Arts and Sciences (2018–2020). In June 2020, she succeeded Wim van Saarloos as president, serving until 2022, when she stepped down from her role and was succeeded by Marileen Dogterom.

In 2024, Sluiter was awarded the Arts and Sciences Medal of Honour for her work on Greek language and literature and for her services in the advisory body of the Royal Palace of Amsterdam Foundation.

== Selected works ==
- Rosen, Ralph M.; Sluiter, Ineke, eds. (2004). Free Speech in Classical Antiquity. Leiden: Brill. ISBN 978-90-47-40568-9.
- Rosen, Ralph M.; Sluiter, Ineke, eds. (2006). City, Countryside, and the Spatial Organization of Value in Classical Antiquity. Leiden: Brill. ISBN 978-90-47-40918-2.
- Copeland, Rita; Sluiter, Ineke (2009). Medieval Grammar and Rhetoric. Language Arts and Literary Theory, AD 300-1475. Oxford: Oxford University Press. ISBN 9780198183419.
- Rosen, Ralph M.; Sluiter, Ineke, eds. (2010). Valuing Others in Classical Antiquity. Leiden: Brill. ISBN 978-90-04-19233-1.
- Rosen, Ralph M.; Sluiter, Ineke, eds. (2012). Aesthetic Value in Classical antiquity. Leiden: Brill. ISBN 978-90-04-23282-2.
- Rosen, Ralph M.; Sluiter, Ineke, eds. (2016). Valuing Landscape in Classical Antiquity: Natural Environment and Cultural Imagination. Leiden: Brill. ISBN 978-90-04-31971-4.
