= Vincenzo Di Benedetto =

Italian classical philologist (1934–2013)

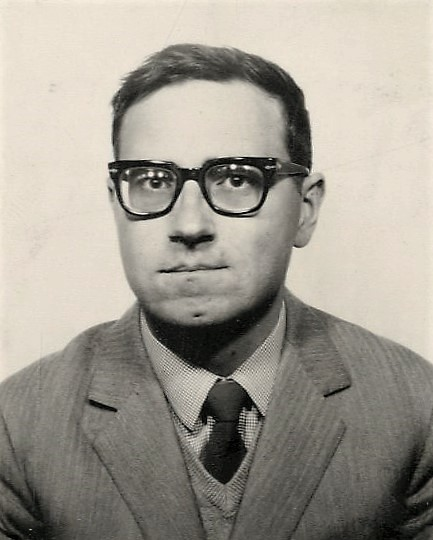
- Born: 12 January 1934; Altomonte, Calabria
- Died: 20 July 2013 (aged 79); Pisa
- Education: University of Pisa
- Scientific career
- Fields: Classical scholars
- Academic advisors: Aurelio Peretti, Augusto Campana, Alessandro Perosa, Ignazio Cazzaniga, Giovanni Pugliese Carratelli, Vittorio Bartoletti, Eduard Fraenkel
- Notable students: Alessandro Lami

Vincenzo Di Benedetto (12 January 1934 – 19 or 20 July 2013) was an Italian classical philologist.

== Life ==
Born to the tailor Saverio Di Benedetto and his wife Maria Gaetana (née Santoro) he grew up in Saracena (Calabria) and acquired a sound knowledge of Latin and Classical Greek at the Liceo Classico in Castrovillari. Having received a scholarship from the Scuola Normale Superiore, he went on to study from 1952 to 1958 in Pisa and Oxford (Corpus Christi College). Apart from his academic mentors, he also acknowledged the influence of his friend, Latinist Sebastiano Timpanaro and his mother, historian of philosophy Maria Timpanaro Cardini. From 1969 onwards until his retirement in 2006 he taught Greek literature at the University of Pisa, and, from 1971 until 1993, Classical Philology at the Scuola Normale. In 1996, he was diagnosed with Parkinson's disease and used a wheelchair since 2006. Despite this, he managed to continue working until shortly before his death.

On May 14, 1972, he married philologist Diana Fiorini; their son Saverio was born on November 27, 1972.

== Achievements ==
His areas of expertise included the history of Greek grammar, Greek tragedy, the so-called Hippocratic Corpus, Sappho, and the Homeric epics, but also the works of Dante, Foscolo, and Manzoni. He published numerous monographs as well as bilingual editions, intended both for a larger public and experts. A household name in his native Italy, he never quite achieved the international recognition he deserved, although his last major work, a bilingual commented edition of the Odyssey (2010), received excellent reviews, such as by Barbara Graziosi, who referred to the book as "a monumental achievement“. Even the selection of his minor works, titled Il richiamo del testo and published by Riccardo Di Donato in 2007, takes up four weighty volumes, containing some of his most important insights, such as his proof that Aristotle, when quoting his sources, had been far more reliable than had hitherto been assumed.

== Selection of works ==
- La tradizione manoscritta euripidea, Padua 1965, ASIN: B0063Y3D5G.
- Euripidis Orestes, introduzione, testo critico, commento e appendice metrica a cura di V. Di Benedetto, Florence 1965.
- Euripide: teatro e società, Turin 1971, ISBN 8806128728.
- L'ideologia del potere e la tragedia greca. Ricerche su Eschilo, Turin 1978, ISBN 88-06-35469-8.
- with Alessandro Lami: Filologia e marxismo. Contro le mistificazioni, Naples 1981, ISBN 88-20-71005-6.
- Sofocle, Florence 1983 (2nd edition 1988), ISBN 88-22-10386-6.
- Il medico e la malattia. La scienza di Ippocrate, Turin 1986, ISBN 88-06-59327-7.
- with Franco Ferrari: Saffo, Poesie, Introduzione di Vincenzo Di Benedetto. Traduzione e note di Franco Ferrari, Milan 1987, ISBN 88-17-16623-5.
- Lo scrittoio di Ugo Foscolo, Turin 1990, ISBN 88-06-11714-9.
- Ugo Foscolo, il sesto tomo dell' Io, edizione critica e commento a cura di V. Di Benedetto, Turin 1991, ISBN 88-06-12179-0.
- Nel laboratorio di Omero, Turin 1994 (considerably enlarged edition 1998), ISBN 88-06-12738-1.
- La tragedia sulla scena: la tragedia greca in quanto spettacolo teatrale (with Enrico Medda). Turin 1997, ISBN 88-06-13777-8.
- Guida ai Promessi sposi. I personaggi, la gente, le idealità, Milan 1999, ISBN 88-17-17268-5.
- Euripide, Le Baccanti, premessa, introduzione, traduzione, costituzione del testo originale e commento a cura di V. Di Benedetto, appendice metrica di E.Cerbo, Milan 2004, ISBN 88-29-80130-5.
- Omero, Odissea, Milan 2010, ISBN 88-17-02071-0.
