= Ancient Greek Musical Notation =

- Range: U+1D200..U+1D24F (80 code points)
- Plane: SMP
- Scripts: Greek
- Symbol sets: Ancient Greek music notation
- Assigned: 70 code points
- Unused: 10 reserved code points

Unicode version history
- 4.1 (2005): 70 (+70)

Unicode documentation
- Code chart ∣ Web page

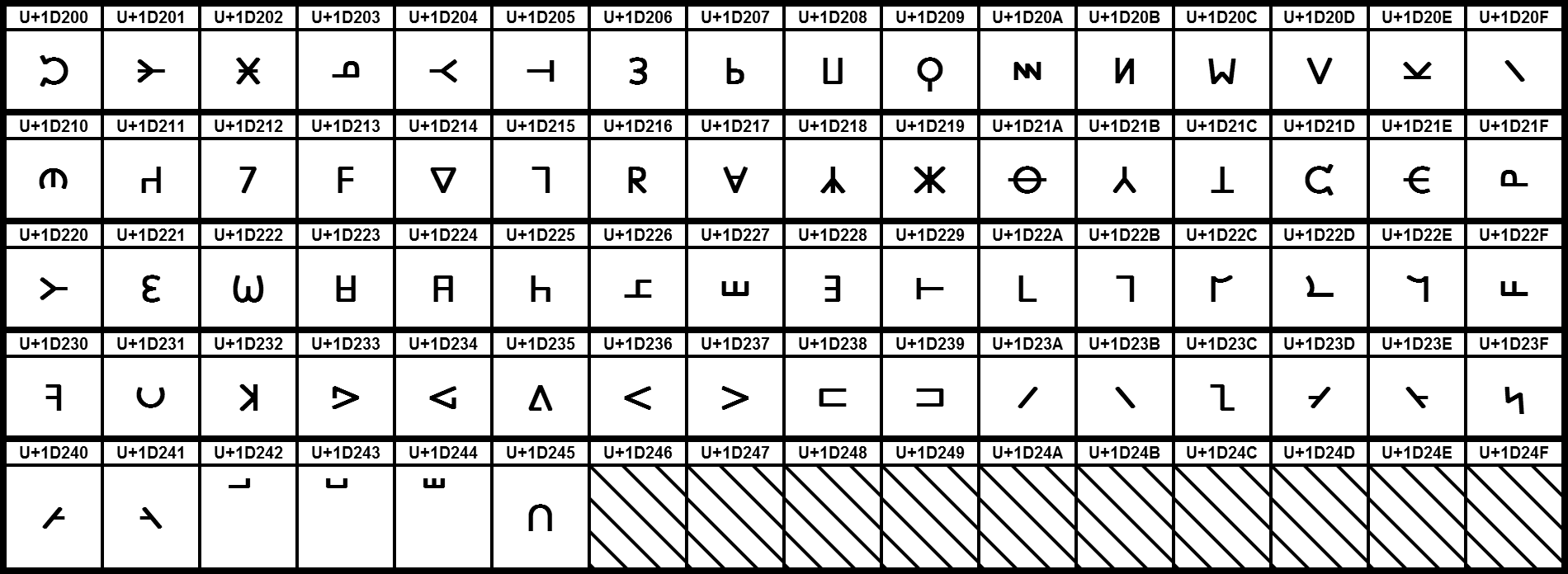
Graphical representation of the Ancient Greek Musical Notation Unicode block

Ancient Greek Musical Notation is a Unicode block containing symbols representing musical notations used in ancient Greece.

== Block ==
Ancient Greek Musical Notation^{[1]}^{[2]} Official Unicode Consortium code chart (PDF)
	0	1	2	3	4	5	6	7	8	9	A	B	C	D	E	F
U+1D20x	𝈀	𝈁	𝈂	𝈃	𝈄	𝈅	𝈆	𝈇	𝈈	𝈉	𝈊	𝈋	𝈌	𝈍	𝈎	𝈏
U+1D21x	𝈐	𝈑	𝈒	𝈓	𝈔	𝈕	𝈖	𝈗	𝈘	𝈙	𝈚	𝈛	𝈜	𝈝	𝈞	𝈟
U+1D22x	𝈠	𝈡	𝈢	𝈣	𝈤	𝈥	𝈦	𝈧	𝈨	𝈩	𝈪	𝈫	𝈬	𝈭	𝈮	𝈯
U+1D23x	𝈰	𝈱	𝈲	𝈳	𝈴	𝈵	𝈶	𝈷	𝈸	𝈹	𝈺	𝈻	𝈼	𝈽	𝈾	𝈿
U+1D24x	𝉀	𝉁	𝉂	𝉃	𝉄	𝉅										
Notes: 1. As of Unicode version 16.0; 2. Grey areas indicate non-assigned code points

== History ==
The following Unicode-related documents record the purpose and process of defining specific characters in the Ancient Greek Musical Notation block:

Version	Final code points (Note: Proposed code points and characters names may differ from final code points and names)	Count	L2 ID	WG2 ID	Document
4.1	U+1D200..1D245	70	L2/02-032		Anderson, Deborah (2002-01-21), Unicode Musical Proposal
4.1	U+1D200..1D245	70	L2/02-033		Anderson, Deborah (2002-01-21), TLG Unicode Proposal (draft)
4.1	U+1D200..1D245	70	L2/02-053		Anderson, Deborah (2002-02-04), Description of TLG Documents
4.1	U+1D200..1D245	70	L2/02-273		Pantelia, Maria (2002-07-31), TLG Unicode Proposal
4.1	U+1D200..1D245	70	L2/02-287		Pantelia, Maria (2002-08-09), Proposal Summary Form accompanying TLG Unicode Proposal (L2/02-273)
4.1	U+1D200..1D245	70	L2/02-316R2	N2547	Pantelia, Maria (2002-11-07), Proposal to encode Ancient Greek Musical Symbols in the UCS
