= NoteEdit =

Defunct music scorewriter

- Final release: 2.8.1 / 4 September 2006; 20 years ago
- Written in: C++
- Operating system: Unix-like
- Type: Scorewriter
- License: GPL-2.0-or-later
- Website: www.berlios.de/software/noteedit/

NoteEdit is a defunct music scorewriter for Linux and other Unix-like computer operating systems. Its official successor is Canorus.

NoteEdit is written in C++, uses the Qt3 toolkit, and is integrated with KDE. Released under the GPL-2.0-or-later license, NoteEdit is free software.

== Features ==
NoteEdit, unlike some Linux-based music editors, features a graphical user interface. NoteEdit's design has been praised by ITworld, and Linux Journal praised both the interface and the relatively wide range of features and applications of the program.

It supports an unlimited number and length of staves, polyphony, MIDI playback of written notes, chord markings, lyrics, and a number of import and export filters to many formats like MIDI, MusicXML, abc, MUP, PMX, MusiXTeX and LilyPond.

Linux Magazine recommends using NoteEdit with FluidSynth, a software synthesizer, to expand NoteEdit's abilities. FluidSynth uses SoundFont technology (a sample-based synthesis) to simulate the sound of a NoteEdit score played by live instruments.

== Authors ==
NoteEdit was maintained by Jörg Anders for a long time. Since August 2004, a new development team was formed. Now there are quite a few people behind this software project:

- Reinhard Katzmann, project manager
- Christian Fasshauer, programmer
- Erik Sigra, developer
- David Faure, KDE User Interface
- Matt Gerassimoff
- Leon Vinken, MusicXML
- Georg Rudolph, LilyPond interface
- Matevž Jekovec, developer and composer
- Karai Csaba, developer

In Autumn 2006 the development team decided to rewrite as score editor in Qt4 from scratch (now known as Canorus). Version 0.1.0 to 0.7.2 released under GPL-2.0-only, and since version 0.7.3 under GPL-3.0-only.

== See also ==
- List of music software
