= Letter notation =

Musical nomenclature with letters to indicate pitch

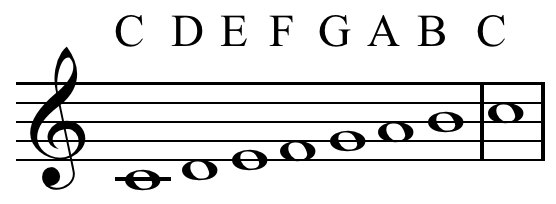
C major scale letter notation. The print letters, above the staff, are not normally included.

In music, letter notation is a system of representing a set of pitches, for example, the notes of a scale, by letters. For the complete Western diatonic scale, for example, these would be the letters A-G, possibly with a trailing symbol to indicate a half-step raise (sharp, ♯) or a half-step lowering (flat, ♭). This is the most common way of specifying a note in speech or in written text in English or German. In Germany, Scandinavia, and parts of Central and Eastern Europe, H is used instead of B, and B is used instead of B♭.

If we consider the chromatic scale, new sounds are obtained by lowering or raising the seven diatonic notes by a semitone by means of flats (♭) and sharps (♯). Use of solfege or letter names depends on language. For a more complete table and explanation, see Musical note.

| Diatonic scale note | first | | second | | third | fourth | | fifth | | sixth | | seventh |
|---|---|---|---|---|---|---|---|---|---|---|---|---|
| Solfege/Italian | do | | re | | mi | fa | | sol | | la | | si |
| Variations | ut | | - | | - | - | | so | | - | | ti |
| Sharp | | do♯ di | | re♯ ri | | | fa♯ fi | | sol♯ si | | la♯ li | |
| Flat | | re♭ ra | | mi♭ me | | | sol♭ se | | la♭ le | | si♭ te | |
| English | C | | D | | E | F | | G | | A | | B |
| Sharp | | C sharp | | D sharp | | | F sharp | | G sharp | | A sharp | |
| Flat | | D flat | | E flat | | | G flat | | A flat | | B flat | |
| German | C | | D | | E | F | | G | | A | B | H |
| Sharp | | Cis | | Dis | | | Fis | | Gis | | Ais | |
| Flat | | Des | | Es | | | Ges | | As | | B | |

Western letter pitch notation has the virtue of identifying discrete pitches, but among its disadvantages are its occasional inability to represent pitches or inflections lying outside those theoretically derived, or (leaving aside chordal and tablature notations) representing the relationship between pitches—e.g., it does not indicate the difference between a whole step and a half step, knowledge of which was so critical to Medieval and Renaissance performers and theorists.

== History ==
The earliest known letter notation in the Western musical tradition appear in the textbook on music De institutione musica by the 6th-century philosopher Boethius. A modified form is next found in the Dialogus de musica (ca. 1000) by Pseudo-Odo, in a discussion of the division of the monochord.

== Guitar chords ==
Letter notation is the most common way of indicating chords for accompaniment, such as guitar chords, for example B♭^{7}. The bass note may be specified after a /, for example C/G is a C major chord with a G bass.

Where a capo is indicated, there is little standardisation. For example, after capo 3, most music sheets will write A to indicate a C chord, that is, they give the chord shape rather than its pitch, but some specify it as C, others give two lines, either the C on top and the A on the bottom or vice versa. A few even use the /, writing C/A or A/C, but this notation is more commonly used for specifying a bass note and will confuse most guitarists.

== Choice of note names ==
In the context of a piece of music, notes must be named for their diatonic functionality. For example, in the key of D major, it is not generally correct to specify G♭ as a melodic note, although its pitch may be the same as F♯, as F♯ is diatonic to D major, while G♭ is not. (In many tuning systems other than twelve tone equal temperament, the pitch of G♭ is not the same as that of F♯). This is normally only an issue in describing the notes corresponding to the black keys of the piano; there is little temptation to write C as B♯ although both may be valid names of the same note. Each is correct in its context.

Note names are also used for specifying the natural scale of a transposing instrument such as a clarinet, trumpet, or saxophone. The note names used are conventional, for example a clarinet is said to be in B♭, E♭, or A (the three most common registers), never in A♯, and D♯, and B (double-flat), while an alto flute is in G.

== Octaves ==
Note names can also be qualified to indicate the octave in which they are sounded. There are several schemes for this, the most common being scientific pitch notation.

Scientific pitch notation is often used to specify the range of an instrument. Where sharps or flats are necessary for this, these are related to the natural scale of the instrument if it has one, otherwise the choice is arbitrary.

== Other note naming schemes ==
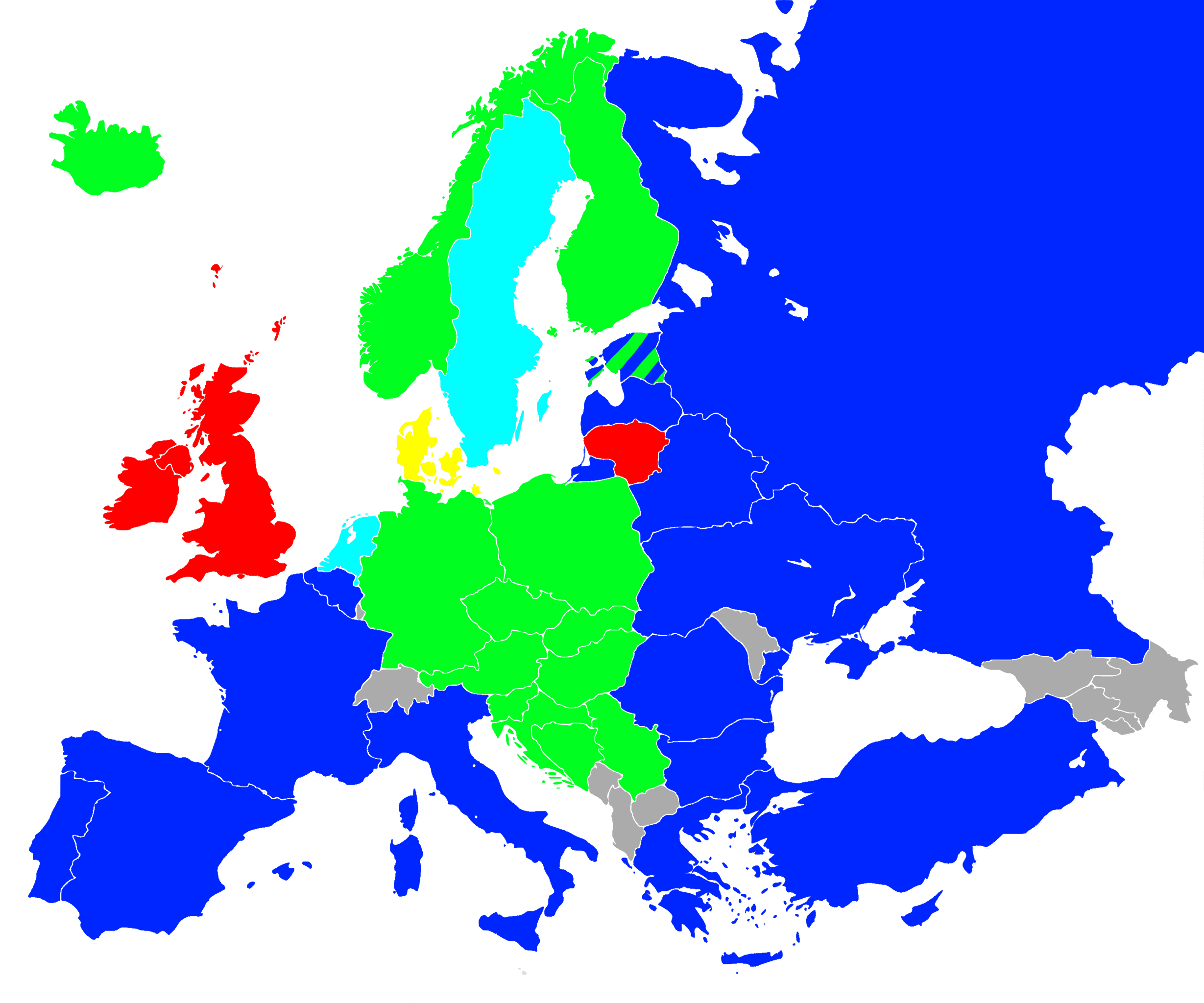
Map of current European preferred note naming Fixed do solfège (Si, La diesis, Si bemolle) English system (B, A#, Bb) German system (H, Ais, B) Dutch system (B, Ais, Bes) Danish system (H, A#, Bb) No data

- In many languages (such as those in the Romance and Slavic families), notes are named by solmization syllables (do, re, mi,...) instead of letters.
- Tonic sol-fa is a type of notation using the initial letters of solfege.
- Alpha is a chromatic extension of the letter notation proposed by the French musician Raphaël André.

== See also ==
- Antiphonary of St. Benigne, letter notation by William of Volpiano
- Abc notation, a letter notation based file format for computer storage of music
- Helmholtz pitch notation
- Keyboard tablature
- Musical notation
- Solfege
- Swara
