= PMX =

PMX can refer to:

- Pacific Media Expo, a multi-genre convention held since 2004 in California.
- PMX (technology) to generate local weather information
- Microsoft Premium Mobile Experiences team, responsible for the KIN phones
- PMX-1000, a computer system-on-a-chip
- A very compact notation for typesetting music; also the preprocessor which expands that notation to MusiXTeX code.
- Pharmacometrics, a discipline that develops mathematical models of biology, pharmacology, disease, and physiology.
- Beretta PMX, a submachine gun produced by Italian firearm maker Beretta
- PMX Global, a brand within Penske Media Corporation
