= Choral Public Domain Library =

Online database for choral and vocal music

- Website type: Music score library
- Available in: English with some help pages in other languages
- Owner: CPDL community
- Creator: Rafael Ornes
- Website: www.cpdl.org
- Commercial: No
- Registration: Optional (required for contributing)
- Launched: December 1998 (27 years ago)
- Current status: Active

The Choral Public Domain Library (CPDL), also known as ChoralWiki, is an online community and repository for choral and vocal music. Its contents primarily include sheet music in the public domain or otherwise freely available for printing and performing (such as via permission from the copyright holder).

It is a 501(c)(3), tax-deductible organization, whose contents are published under one of multiple types of specific copyright licenses. Editing articles or contributing scores is allowed only for contributors who create a free account. CPDL stands with Musopen and the Wind Repertory Project as among the most prominent online music repertoire databases.

== Overview ==
The site CPDL.org was launched in December 1998 by Rafael Ornes. In 2005 CPDL was ported, or converted, to wiki format, and is also known as ChoralWiki. In July 2008, Ornes stepped back from site administration and turned over operational responsibilities to a transition committee which subsequently incorporated CPDL as a non-profit under California state law and now operates CPDL.

In addition to making sheet music scores available, the site includes:

- original texts, their sources and translations;
- cross-indexing of choral music using criteria including musical genre, period, and number/distribution of voice parts;
- composer information;
- description and performance considerations can be included for works;
- indexes of published collections (primarily historical collections) of choral music;
- community discussion such as through a bulletin board forum or via "Talk" pages related to composers or specific works.
- sponsorship recognition and a way to donate via credit card or PayPal.

Music is available for free download in a variety of formats, including score images in PDF, PS and TIFF format, sound files in MIDI and MP3 formats, and in the notation formats supported by various notation programs, including Finale, Sibelius, NoteWorthy Composer, Encore, and the open source GNU LilyPond. Most scores on CPDL are distributed under an open-source license. As of 1 December 2017, CPDL archives over 27,800 scores by more than 2,900 composers, contributed by over 1,200 editors and contributors. It includes large numbers of scores from the Renaissance and Baroque eras, including nearly complete vocal works by William Byrd and Tomás Luis de Victoria in excellent editions.

CPDL is suggested as a resource by departmental or faculty websites at Kent State University, Northern Illinois University, the University of Oregon, the University of Western Ontario, the Internet Public Library of the University of Michigan, the University at Albany, The State University of New York, by the UCLA Music Library, by the libraries at the Universities of Boston and Stanford and by inclusion by faculty members in syllabi for courses at the University of Wisconsin–Oshkosh. It is recommended by the Iowa and Massachusetts chapters of the American Choral Directors Association, and is included in the resource database of Intute, an association of institutions in the UK.

Jason Sickel has described the CPDL as a Gold Mine for Choral Directors.

== License terms ==
Unless a contributor elects one of multiple copyright license types supported, contents are published under a default specific copyright license based on the GNU GPL license.

The default CPDL license allows copying and distributing copies of a musical edition, as well as modification and derivative works free or for a fee, as permitted by the license, conspicuously retaining on each copy the applicable copyright notice or other references to the license or terms under which it is distributed.

== See also ==
- List of online music databases
- Public domain resources
- Werner Icking Music Archive
- Mutopia Project
- Kantoreiarchiv
- International Music Score Library Project (IMSLP)
