= Decebal =

Decebal may refer to:

- Decebalus, 1st-century king of Dacia
- Decebal, a village in Tătărăuca Veche, Moldova
- Decebal, a village in Vetiș, Romania
- Decebal (name), a Romanian given name

== See also ==
- Decibel (disambiguation)
