= Werner Icking Music Archive =

Web archive of public domain sheet music

The Werner Icking Music Archive (often abbreviated WIMA) is a web archive of liberally licensed sheet music of public domain music. The scores are electronically typeset by volunteers and distributed in PDF, often accompanied by their typesetting files. WIMA continues the defunct GMD Music Archive and is named after its founder, the late Werner Icking. After a merge completed in 2012, the archive forms part of the International Music Score Library Project (IMSLP).

== History ==
Icking's original archive at the GMD (Gesellschaft für Mathematik und Datenverarbeitung) in Germany was the oldest online collaborative distribution site for music scores. Following Icking's death in 2001, the administration of the site was taken over by Danish composer and computer programmer Christian Mondrup. Renamed as the Werner Icking Music Archive in honour of its founder, the site was transferred to the Department of Computer Science (DAIMI) at the University of Aarhus, Denmark. By February 2010, the university could no longer host it and Mondrup opted for a commercial web host sponsored by the Danish firm Paldam IT.

WIMA offers primarily Baroque and Renaissance music, but the archive also contains jazz scores. WIMA is also the home site of MusiXTeX, a suite of open source music typesetting utilities based on the typesetting system TeX. The majority of the compositions represented in WIMA are early music. Some of the early music scores published in WIMA are the first modern editions of these compositions. A number of contemporary composers have chosen to publish their works in WIMA. The older music offered in WIMA is out of copyright.

== Werner Icking ==
The mathematician and computer scientist Werner Icking (25 June 1943–8 February 2001) spent a large part of his career at the Gesellschaft für Mathematik und Datenverarbeitung, a national research centre for applied mathematics and computer science in Sankt Augustin, Germany. (The GMD was later absorbed into the Fraunhofer-Gesellschaft.) He not only played a key role in the development and distribution of MusiXTeX software, but also produced new editions of music by baroque composers, most notably the complete Urtext editions of Bach's works for solo violin and cello. He had played the violin since he was a child and for a time was first violin in the Chamber Orchestra of the Musikschule der Bundesstadt Bonn (City of Bonn Music School). Icking died at the age of 57 in a cycling accident while returning home from work. Several original compositions on the Werner Icking Music Archive are dedicated to his memory. His academic publications included:

- BITS programmer's guide, Issue 15 of Institut für Software Technologie (St. Augustin), 1973
- GMDTEXT: eine Texter-Verpackung Benutzeranleitung (Volume 197 of Arbeitspapiere der Gesellschaft für Mathematik und Datenverarbeitung, GMD, 1986
- "MuTeX, MusicTeX, and MusiXTeX" in Eleanor Selfridge-Field (ed.) Beyond MIDI: The handbook of musical codes, MIT Press, 1997, pp. 222-231. ISBN 0-262-19394-9

== IMSLP merge ==
On August 23, 2011, an announcement was made that the Werner Icking Music Archive would merge with International Music Score Library Project (IMSLP). WIMA had announced the merge on its own site five days before in an open letter to contributors. After working out some technical issues, IMSLP decided to officially commence the merge on August 28. On July 21, 2012, the merge project was reported officially complete. Since then, virtually the entire collection of WIMA forms part of IMSLP.

== See also ==
- Public domain resources
- List of online music databases

Other public domain music projects

- International Music Score Library Project
- Choral Public Domain Library
- Mutopia Project
