= Decibel (disambiguation) =

The decibel (dB) is a unit of measurement expressing the ratio of two physical quantities.

Decibel may also refer to:

== Music ==
- Decibel (band), an Italian punk rock band
- Decibels (album), an album by Razor
- "Decibel", a song by AC/DC from the album Black Ice

== Other uses ==
- Decibel (film), 2022 South Korean film
- Decibel (company), former name of Quantone, a company providing a music discovery metadata database
- Decibel (magazine), a heavy metal periodical magazine
- Decibel Festival, an electronic music and visual art event
- Decibel, an alternate codename of Marvel Comics character Chamber

== See also ==
- Decebal (disambiguation)
