= WIMA =

WIMA may refer to:

- Werner Icking Music Archive
- WIMA (AM), an AM radio station located in Lima, Ohio
- WIMA Spezialvertrieb elektronischer Bauelemente GmbH & Co.KG, a capacitor manufacturer company
- Women's International Motorcycle Association
