= List of music sharing websites =

Name	Launched	Tracks	Type	Users	Genres	Headquarters
Amazon Music Unlimited	2016	2000000	Trial-ware	—	General	United States
Apple Music	2015	45000000	Trial-ware	30000000	General	United States
DatPiff	2005	—	Free	15000000	Hip Hop, Urban	United States
Deezer	2007	53000000	Free	14000000	General	France
Google Play Music	2011	15000	Trial-ware	50,000	General	United States
Jamendo	2005	400000	Free	—	General	Luxembourg
Live Music Archive	1996	170000	Free	—	General	United States
Musopen	2005	—	Free	—	Classical music	United States
Noise Trade	2008	—	Free	1.3000000	General	United States
SoundCloud	2007	125000000	Free	40000000	General	Germany
Spotify	2006	35000000	Free	140000000	General	Luxembourg
Tidal	2014	60000000	Trial-ware	—	General	Norway
YouTube Music	2015	30000000	Free	—	General	United States

== See also ==
- List of online music databases
- List of Internet radio stations
