= Scientific pitch notation =

Musical notation system to describe pitch and relative frequency

Scientific pitch notation (SPN), also known as American standard pitch notation (ASPN) and international pitch notation (IPN), is a method of specifying musical pitch by combining a musical note name (with accidental if needed) and a number identifying the pitch's octave.

Although scientific pitch notation was originally designed as a companion to scientific pitch (see below), the two are not synonymous. Scientific pitch is a pitch standard—a system that defines the specific frequencies of particular pitches (see below). Scientific pitch notation concerns only how pitch names are notated, that is, how they are designated in printed and written text, and does not inherently specify actual frequencies. Thus, the use of scientific pitch notation to distinguish octaves does not depend on the pitch standard used.

== Nomenclature ==
The notation makes use of the traditional tone names (A to G) which are followed by numbers showing which octave they are part of.

For standard A440 pitch equal temperament, the system begins at a frequency of 16.35160 Hz, which is assigned the value C_{0}.

The octave 0 of the scientific pitch notation is traditionally called the sub-contra octave, and the tone marked C_{0} in SPN is written as ,,C or C,, or CCC in traditional systems, such as Helmholtz notation. Octave 0 of SPN marks the low end of what humans can actually perceive, with the average person being able to hear frequencies no lower than 20 Hz as pitches.

The octave number increases by 1 upon an ascension from B to C. Thus, A_{0} refers to the first A above C_{0} and middle C (the one-line octave's C or simply c′) is denoted as C_{4} in SPN. For example, C_{4} is one note above B_{3}, and A_{5} is one note above G_{5}.

The octave number is tied to the alphabetic character used to describe the pitch, with the division between note letters 'B' and 'C', thus:

- "B_{3}" and all of its possible variants (B, B♭, B, B♯, B) would properly be designated as being in octave "3".
- "C_{4}" and all of its possible variants (C, C♭, C, C♯, C) would properly be designated as being in octave "4".
- In equal temperament "C♭_{4}" is the same frequency as "B_{3}".

== Use ==
Scientific pitch notation is often used to specify the range of an instrument. It provides an unambiguous means of identifying a note in terms of textual notation rather than frequency, while at the same time avoiding the transposition conventions that are used in writing the music for instruments such as the clarinet and guitar. It is also easily translated into staff notation, as needed. In describing musical pitches, nominally enharmonic spellings can give rise to anomalies where, for example in Pythagorean intonation C♭_{4} is a lower frequency than B_{3}; but such paradoxes usually do not arise in a scientific context.

Scientific pitch notation avoids possible confusion between various derivatives of Helmholtz notation which use similar symbols to refer to different notes. For example, "C" in Helmholtz's original notation refers to the C two octaves below middle C, whereas "C" in ABC Notation refers to middle C itself. With scientific pitch notation, middle C is always C_{4}, and C_{4} is never any note but middle C. This notation system also avoids the "fussiness" of having to visually distinguish between four and five primes, as well as the typographic issues involved in producing acceptable subscripts or substitutes for them. C_{7} is much easier to quickly distinguish visually from C_{8}, than is, for example, c′′′′ from c′′′′′, and the use of simple integers (e.g. C7 and C8) makes subscripts unnecessary altogether.

Although pitch notation is intended to describe sounds audibly perceptible as pitches, it can also be used to specify the frequency of non-pitch phenomena. Notes below E_{0} or higher than E♭_{10} are outside most humans' hearing range, although notes slightly outside the hearing range on the low end may still be indirectly perceptible as pitches due to their overtones falling within the hearing range. For an example of truly inaudible frequencies, when the Chandra X-ray Observatory observed the waves of pressure fronts propagating away from a black hole, their one oscillation every 10 million years was described by NASA as corresponding to the B♭ fifty-seven octaves below middle C (B♭_{−53}) or 3.235 fHz).

The notation is sometimes used in the context of meantone temperament, and does not always assume equal temperament nor the standard concert A_{4} of 440 Hz; this is particularly the case in connection with earlier music.

The standard proposed to the Acoustical Society of America explicitly states a logarithmic scale for frequency, which excludes meantone temperament, and the base frequency it uses gives A_{4} a frequency of exactly 440 Hz. However, when dealing with earlier music that did not use equal temperament, it is understandably easier to simply refer to notes by their closest modern equivalent, as opposed to specifying the difference using cents every time. (Note: The conventions of musical pitch notation require the use of sharps and flats on the circle of fifths closest to the key currently in use, and forbid substitution of notes with the same frequency in equal temperament, such as A♯ and B♭. These rules have the effect of (usually) producing more nearly consonant pitches when using meantone systems, and other non-equal temperaments. In almost all meantone temperaments, the so-called enharmonic notes, such as A♯ and B♭, are a different pitch, with A♯ at a lower frequency than the enharmonic B♭. With the single exception of equal temperament (which fits in among meantone systems as a special case) enharmonic notes always have slightly different frequencies.)

== Table of note frequencies ==
An 88-key piano keyboard, with the octaves numbered and middle C (cyan) and A440 (yellow) highlighted

The table below gives notation for pitches based on standard piano key frequencies: standard concert pitch and twelve-tone equal temperament. When a piano is tuned to just intonation, C_{4} refers to the same key on the keyboard, but a slightly different frequency. Notes not produced by any piano are highlighted in medium gray, and those produced only by an extended 112-key piano, light gray.

Fundamental frequency in hertz (MIDI note number)
Octave Note	−1	0	1	2	3	4	5	6	7	8	9	10
C	8.175799 (0)	16.35160 (12)	32.70320 (24)	65.40639 (36)	130.8128 (48)	261.6256 (60)	523.2511 (72)	1046.502 (84)	2093.005 (96)	4186.009 (108)	8372.018 (120)	16744.04
C♯/D♭	8.661957 (1)	17.32391 (13)	34.64783 (25)	69.29566 (37)	138.5913 (49)	277.1826 (61)	554.3653 (73)	1108.731 (85)	2217.461 (97)	4434.922 (109)	8869.844 (121)	17739.69
D	9.177024 (2)	18.35405 (14)	36.70810 (26)	73.41619 (38)	146.8324 (50)	293.6648 (62)	587.3295 (74)	1174.659 (86)	2349.318 (98)	4698.636 (110)	9397.273 (122)	18794.55
E♭/D♯	9.722718 (3)	19.44544 (15)	38.89087 (27)	77.78175 (39)	155.5635 (51)	311.1270 (63)	622.2540 (75)	1244.508 (87)	2489.016 (99)	4978.032 (111)	9956.063 (123)	19912.13
E	10.30086 (4)	20.60172 (16)	41.20344 (28)	82.40689 (40)	164.8138 (52)	329.6276 (64)	659.2551 (76)	1318.510 (88)	2637.020 (100)	5274.041 (112)	10548.08 (124)	21096.16
F	10.91338 (5)	21.82676 (17)	43.65353 (29)	87.30706 (41)	174.6141 (53)	349.2282 (65)	698.4565 (77)	1396.913 (89)	2793.826 (101)	5587.652 (113)	11175.30 (125)	22350.61
F♯/G♭	11.56233 (6)	23.12465 (18)	46.24930 (30)	92.49861 (42)	184.9972 (54)	369.9944 (66)	739.9888 (78)	1479.978 (90)	2959.955 (102)	5919.911 (114)	11839.82 (126)	23679.64
G	12.24986 (7)	24.49971 (19)	48.99943 (31)	97.99886 (43)	195.9977 (55)	391.9954 (67)	783.9909 (79)	1567.982 (91)	3135.963 (103)	6271.927 (115)	12543.85 (127)	25087.71
A♭/G♯	12.97827 (8)	25.95654 (20)	51.91309 (32)	103.8262 (44)	207.6523 (56)	415.3047 (68)	830.6094 (80)	1661.219 (92)	3322.438 (104)	6644.875 (116)	13289.75	26579.50
A	13.75000 (9)	27.50000 (21)	55.00000 (33)	110.0000 (45)	220.0000 (57)	440.0000 (69)	880.0000 (81)	1760.000 (93)	3520.000 (105)	7040.000 (117)	14080.00	28160.00
B♭/A♯	14.56762 (10)	29.13524 (22)	58.27047 (34)	116.5409 (46)	233.0819 (58)	466.1638 (70)	932.3275 (82)	1864.655 (94)	3729.310 (106)	7458.620 (118)	14917.24	29834.48
B	15.43385 (11)	30.86771 (23)	61.73541 (35)	123.4708 (47)	246.9417 (59)	493.8833 (71)	987.7666 (83)	1975.533 (95)	3951.066 (107)	7902.133 (119)	15804.27	31608.53

Mathematically, given the number n of semitones above middle C, the fundamental frequency in hertz is given by $440 \cdot 2^{(n-9)/12}$. Given the MIDI NoteOn number m, the frequency of the note is normally $440 \cdot 2^{(m-69)/12}$ Hz, using standard tuning.

== Scientific pitch versus scientific pitch notation ==
Scientific pitch is an absolute pitch standard, first proposed in 1713 by French physicist Joseph Sauveur. It was defined so that all Cs are integer powers of 2, with middle C (C_{4}) at 256 hertz. As already noted, it is not dependent upon, nor a part of scientific pitch notation described here. To avoid the confusion in names, scientific pitch is sometimes also called "Verdi tuning" or "philosophical pitch".

The current international pitch standard, using A_{4} as exactly 440 Hz, had been informally adopted by the music industry as far back as 1926, and A440 became the official international pitch standard in 1955. SPN is routinely used to designate pitch in this system. A_{4} may be tuned to other frequencies under different tuning standards, and SPN octave designations still apply (ISO 16).

With changes in concert pitch and the widespread adoption of A440 as a musical standard, new scientific frequency tables were published by the Acoustical Society of America in 1939, and adopted by the International Organization for Standardization in 1955. C_{0}, which was exactly 16 Hz under the scientific pitch standard, is now 16.35160 Hz under the current international standard system.

== See also ==
- Music and mathematics
- Helmholtz pitch notation
- MIDI
- MIDI tuning standard
- Piano key frequencies
- Keyboard tablature
- Letter notation
