= Wind Repertory Project =

Wind music database

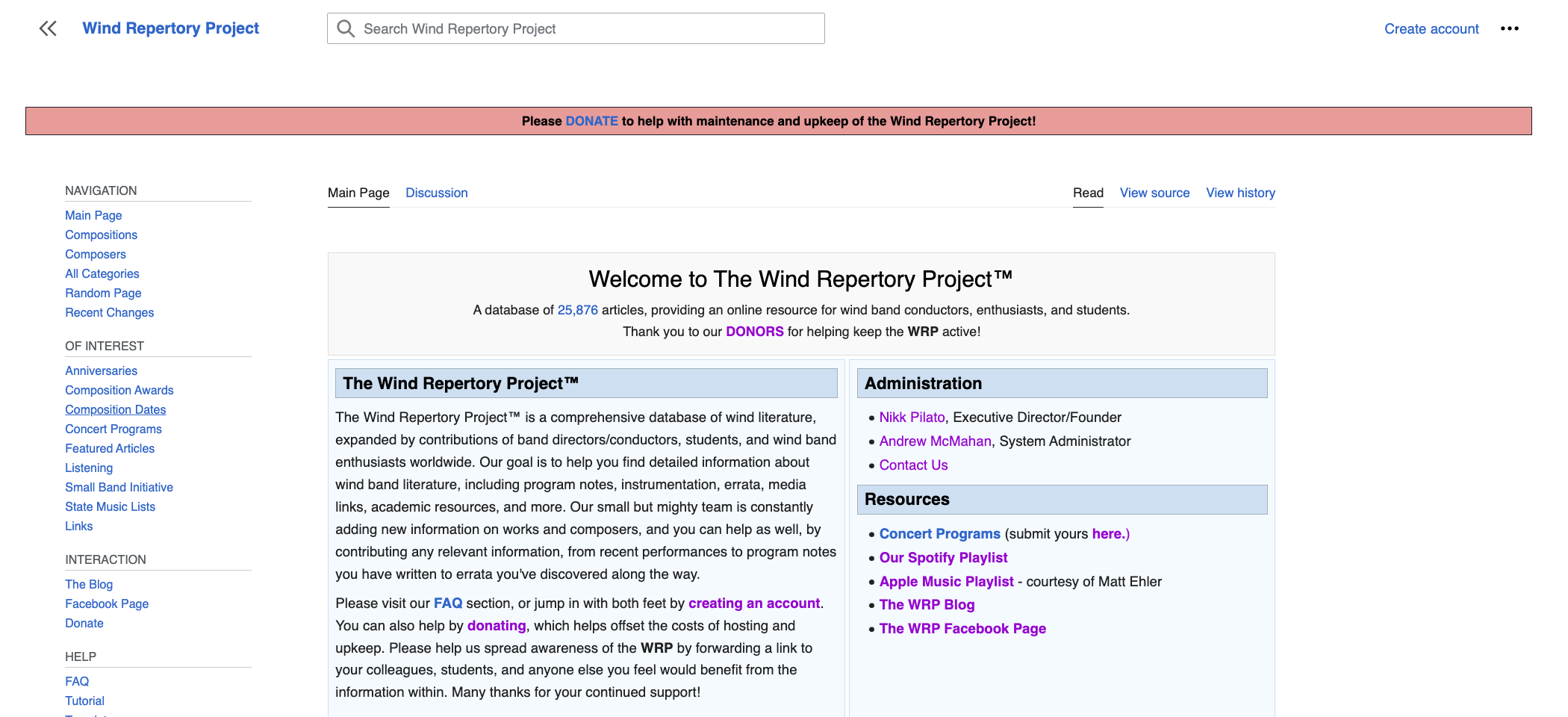
- The Wind Repertory homepage as of June 2024
- Creator: Nikk Pilato
- Website: www.windrep.org
- Launched: 2008; 18 years ago
- Current status: Active

The Wind Repertory Project (WRP) is an online database of music written for wind and percussion instruments (concert band). Built on the MediaWiki framework, the WRP is primarily intended as a reference work for band directors and other musicians.

Founded in 2008 by conductor and educator Nikk Pilato, as of 2025 the WRP includes over 28,000 entries on individual compositions and composers. It stands with the ChoralWiki and Musopen as among the most prominent online music repertoire databases.

== Overview ==
The Wind Repertory Project (WRP) is an extensive database documenting and listing wind repertoire—music written for wind instruments. Primarily intended for band directors, the site's search is customizable, by composer, demographics, instrumentation, form, style and instrumental solo features. Built on the MediaWiki framework, WRP is a collaborative wiki site, guest editors can contribute their own additions and discussions. Regular editors include a variety of musicians, including university faculty and graduate students.

The WRP was founded in 2008 by Nikk Pilato while working on a post-doctoral fellowship at the University of Louisville. Pilato originally developed the idea as a potential doctoral dissertation during graduate work at Florida State University; intending the dissertation to be a "document comprising a listing of wind repertory information," inspired by conductor David Daniels, whose Orchestral Music: A Handbook served a similar role for orchestral music.

As of 2025, the WRP includes over 28,000 entries on individual compositions and composers. Each composition entry includes instrumentation, program notes, erratas, state ratings and performance histories. Nikk Pilato remains the executive director, while Andrew McMahan is the System Administrator.

The Wind Repertory Project stands with the ChoralWiki and Musopen as among the most prominent online music repertoire databases. It has also been likened to Wikipedia, as two sites in which musicians may contribute to as they develop their own knowledge and skills.
