= Wikifonia =

2006–2013 sheet music website

Wikifonia was an on-line publisher of sheet music, combining a MusicXML-based technology in a wiki system, with copyright clearance. Its score database was accessible from 2006 to 2013.

== Development ==
The Wikifonia system was developed in a collaboration between several institutes of higher education in Ghent, Belgium. In March 2005 the researchers of the project received the Creativity to Business Award from the Ghent University Association. (Note: For information on the Ghent University Association, see their archived about page.) The system went live on 6 November 2006.

== Copyrights ==
The Wikifonia system aimed at the creation of music, the publication of public domain traditionals, and the publication of previously copyrighted music.

Music published on the Wikifonia website was licensed by Musi©opy, a music copyright clearance organisation based in the Netherlands. The actual rights were paid for by the Wikifonia foundation, a non-profit organisation founded in July 2006.

== Wiki ==
The Wikifonia website could be browsed and the sheet music downloaded in PDF or MusicXML format, without login or subscription.

Uploading music, in MusicXML format, and commenting on published music required login or registration.

== Termination ==
The Wikifonia website was discontinued on 25 December 2013 due to Wikifonia Foundation's inability to continue to obtain copyright licenses. After this date, the website encouraged visitors to use MuseScore.

== See also ==
- List of online music databases
