= International Music Score Library Project =

Library of public-domain music scores

IMSLP Petrucci Music Library

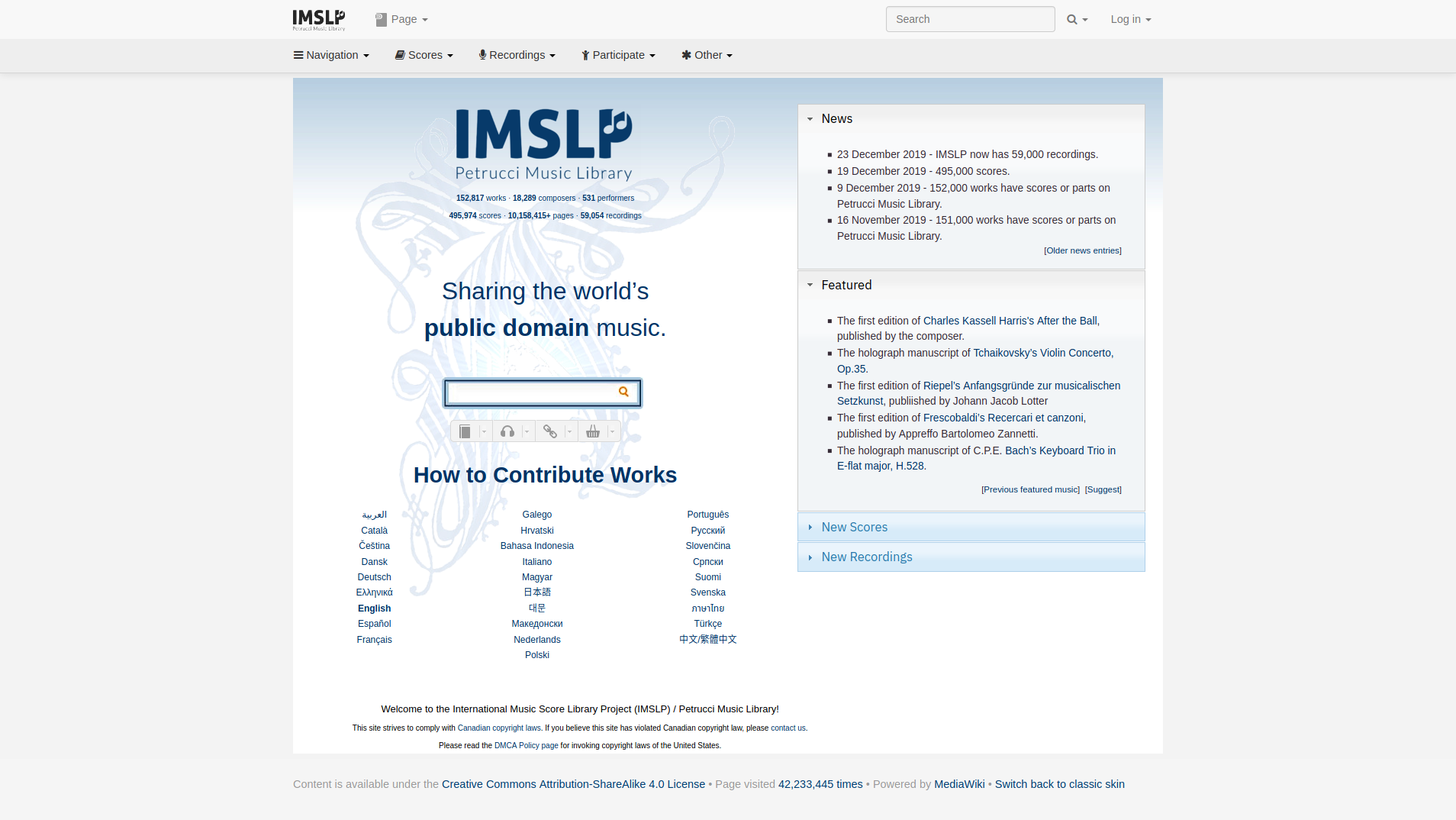
- Screenshot IMSLP main page in 2019
- Website type: Online library of sheet music
- Available in: Arabic; Catalan; Chinese; Croatian; Czech; Danish; Dutch; English; Finnish; French; Galician; German; Greek; Hungarian; Indonesian; Italian; Japanese; Korean; Macedonian; Polish; Portuguese; Russian; Serbian; Slovenian; Spanish; Swedish; Thai; Turkish
- Headquarters: Canada
- Owner: Project Petrucci LLC (private company)
- Creator: Edward W. Guo (Feldmahler)
- Website: imslp.org; petruccilibrary.org
- Commercial: Yes (subscription)
- Registration: Optional (required for contributing and unconstrained access)
- Launched: February 16, 2006; 20 years ago (website); July 10, 2018; 8 years ago (iOS); March 28, 2019; 7 years ago (Android)
- Current status: Active
- Content licence: Creative Commons Attribution-ShareAlike 4.0 International

The International Music Score Library Project (IMSLP), also known as the Petrucci Music Library after publisher Ottaviano Petrucci, is a digital library of public-domain music scores, available either as a subscription-based service or free without registering. The project uses MediaWiki software, and as of 24 November 2023 had uploaded more than 736,000 scores and 80,700 recordings by 1,900 performers of more than 226,000 works by 27,400 composers. IMSLP has both an iOS app and an Android app.

== History ==
=== Overview ===
The site was launched on February 16, 2006. The library consists mainly of scans of old musical editions out of copyright. In addition, it admits scores by contemporary composers who wish to share their music with the world by releasing it under a Creative Commons license. One of the main projects of the IMSLP was the sorting and uploading of the complete works of Johann Sebastian Bach in the Bach-Gesellschaft Ausgabe (1851–99), a task that was completed on November 3, 2008. Besides J.S. Bach's complete public domain works, many or all available public domain works of Amy Beach, Ludwig van Beethoven, Johannes Brahms, Joseph Canteloube, Emmanuel Chabrier, Ernest Chausson, Frédéric Chopin, Joseph Haydn, Arcangelo Corelli, Claude Debussy, Vincent d'Indy, Paul Dukas, Gabriel Fauré, Pierre-Octave Ferroud, George Frideric Handel, Jean Huré, Albéric Magnard, Giovanni Pierluigi da Palestrina, Maurice Ravel, Albert Roussel, Erik Satie, Florent Schmitt, Franz Schubert, Clara Schumann, Robert Schumann, Alexander Scriabin and Jean Sibelius are available, as well as a large percentage of Wolfgang Amadeus Mozart and Franz Liszt's works. Some less-played scores of these composers remain unavailable, as well as many scores being available only as the composer's original manuscript.

Besides providing a digital repository, the IMSLP offers possibilities as a musicological encyclopaedia, since multiple and historical editions of a single composition can be uploaded. Also, pages on publishers provide valuable information, and the work pages themselves often contain a large quantity of information, e.g. roles in an opera.

IMSLP is recommended as a research tool by MIT, which also uses it extensively for providing scores for its OpenCourseWare courses. It is suggested as a resource by the Sibley Music Library and by libraries at other universities such as Stanford University, University of California, Los Angeles, Brown University, University of Pennsylvania, University of Wisconsin–Madison, Oberlin Conservatory of Music, Manhattan School of Music University of Maryland, University of Washington, University of Cincinnati, University of Wisconsin–Milwaukee, Appalachian State University in the US, McGill University in Canada, University of Oxford, University of Cambridge, University of Edinburgh University of Bristol in the UK, University of Melbourne in Australia, and others. In 2019, IMSLP and TwoSetViolin collaborated to make a TwoSetViolin x IMSLP merchandise lineup.

=== Logo ===
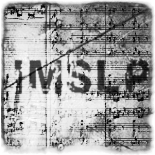
IMSLP logo (2007–2015)

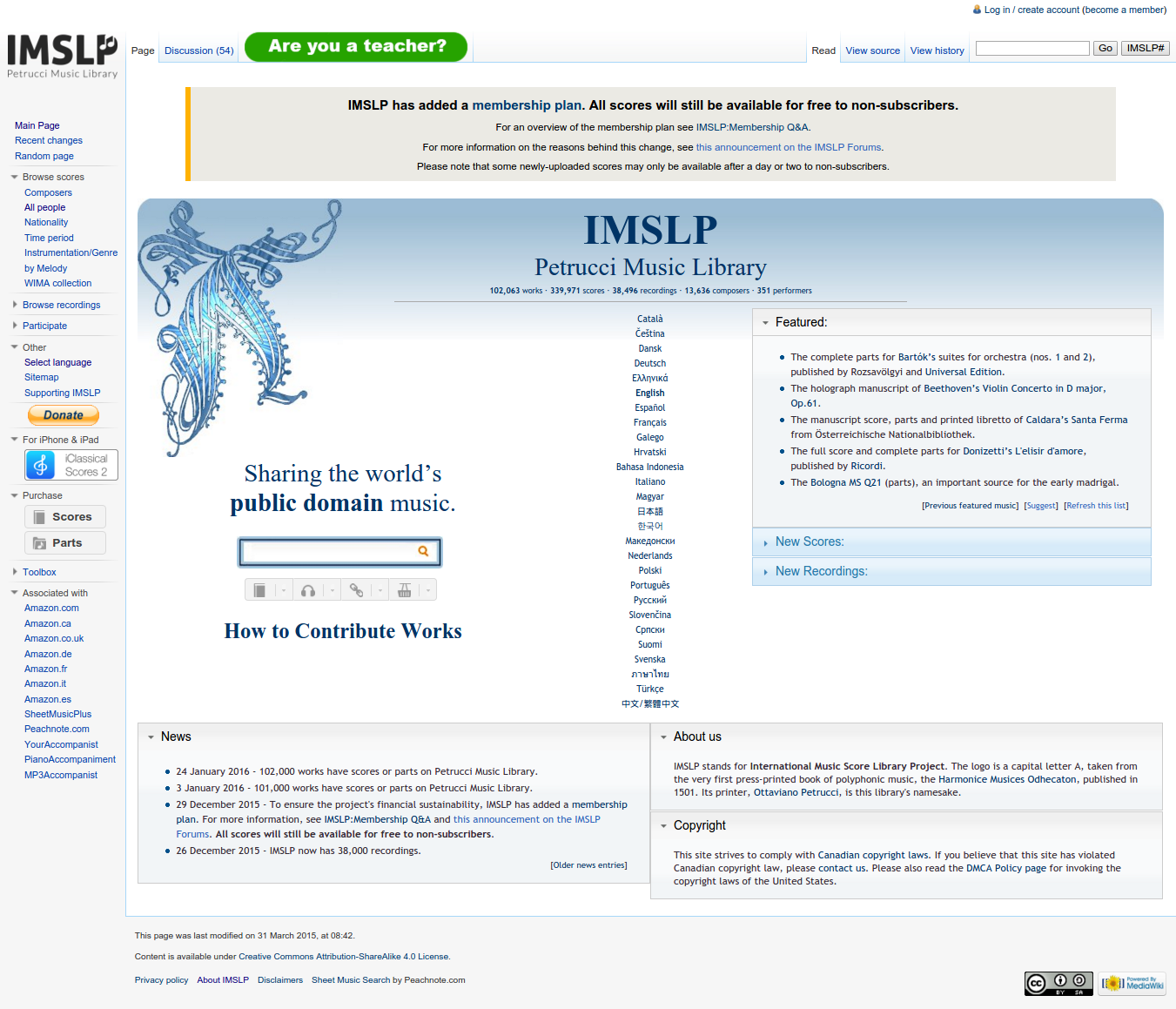
The blue letter featured in Petrucci Music Library logo, used in 2007–2015, was based on the first printed book of music, the Harmonice Musices Odhecaton, published by Ottaviano Petrucci in 1501.

From 2007 to 2015, the IMSLP / Petrucci Music Library used a logo based on a score. The score image in the background was taken from the beginning of the first printed book of music, the Harmonice Musices Odhecaton. It was published in Venice, Italy in 1501 by Ottaviano Petrucci, the library's namesake.

In 2016, the IMSLP changed its logo to a clean wordmark, featuring its two project names—IMSLP and Petrucci Music Library.

=== Awards ===
In 2009, the IMSLP won the MERLOT Classics award for Music. It was named one of the Top 100 Web Sites of 2009 (in the "Undiscovered" subsection) by PC Magazine. In 2018, Edward Guo was honored with The Helen Rice Award by the Associated Chamber Music Players (ACMP) Foundation in recognition of those who have moved the chamber music world in a new directions.

=== Closure and reopening ===
On October 19, 2007, the IMSLP closed following legal demands from Universal Edition of Vienna, Austria. The cease and desist letter expressed concern that some works that are in public domain in the server's location in Canada with copyright protection of 50 years following death, but are protected by a term of 70 years following death in some other countries, were available in those countries. The administrator of the website, Edward W. Guo, also known under the nickname Feldmahler, decided to close down the repository, but left the forums online so that discussions into the best way to proceed could be made:

On Saturday October 13, 2007, I received a second Cease and Desist letter from Universal Edition. At first I thought this letter would be similar in content to the first Cease and Desist letter I received in August. However, after lengthy discussions with very knowledgeable lawyers and supporters, I became painfully aware of the fact that I, a normal college student, has neither the energy nor the money necessary to deal with this issue in any other way than to agree with the cease and desist, and take down the entire site. I cannot apologize enough to all IMSLP contributors, who have done so much for IMSLP in the last two years.

— Feldmahler (project leader)

In response, director Michael S. Hart of Project Gutenberg offered support to keep the project online. This offer was declined by Guo, who voiced concern about having the project hosted in the United States, and consulted the Canadian wing of Project Gutenberg. On November 2, 2007, Michael Geist, a prominent Canadian copyright academic, wrote an article for the BBC discussing the specifics and the wider implications of this case.

IMSLP went back online on June 30, 2008. Since its reopening, the site has been using a strict copyright policy wherein uploaded files are made accessible for download only after the copyright status for three most frequent copyright regimes has been reviewed by staff members. Although the server is located in Canada, files that are not public domain in the US were until July 2010 flagged [TB], for 'Technical Block' or 'Temporary Block', and could not be viewed. The FAQ posted in their forum stated, "Unfortunately, these 'temporary' blocks will be until further notice – possibly all the way until the expiration of term in the USA." After an initial phase, [TB] flagged items have essentially disappeared thanks to the introduction of regional servers operated by unaffiliated organizations.

On 21 April 2011, the Music Publishers Association (UK) issued a DMCA takedown notice against the IMSLP. GoDaddy, the domain name registrar for the IMSLP, removed the domain name "imslp.org", leaving it inaccessible. The MPA's argument was similar to that made in 2007 by Universal Edition. In particular, the MPA claimed that Rachmaninoff's 1913 choral symphony The Bells violated US and EU copyright. According to the IMSLP, the action is without any merit. Almost 24 hours later, the MPA (UK) announced on Twitter that they had asked Go Daddy to reinstate the domain name.

=== Subscription introduction ===
On December 27, 2015, the IMSLP moved to a subscription-based model, where users are expected to pay to avoid a waiting period on some of the files available on the site, and to access certain newly uploaded files. Users who have not paid are subject to a 15-second waiting period on certain files (excluding Creative Commons-licensed files that constitute a majority of the site's files), and are required to wait up to two days to access newly uploaded files.

The project leader Edward Guo claimed the changes were made because the level of funding was "not sustainable in the long run", but also noted:

The income we receive from various sources have been enough to maintain the site so far, but I increasingly believe that this level of funding is not sustainable in the long run. We are not, like traditional music libraries, bound by the service of a conservatory, university or publisher, but rather can do things that traditional institutions are not willing to do, because we serve only musicians and music lovers. But everything is a tradeoff – we also do not have the funding infrastructure these traditional institutions have, and over the past few years I've frankly exhausted my imagination in searching for new realistic sources of funding for IMSLP.

And so I will announce here that a subscription system for IMSLP will be put in place. But this will not be a traditional subscription model – in particular, no file will be blocked from access by the public. Rather, a subscription will permit a member to download files without having to wait a certain number of seconds, eliminiate [sic] some of the advertising on the site, and a few other benefits. I see this as a way to both preserve IMSLP's philosophy of open access and to secure IMSLP's future.

Guo attributed the change in funding to discussions with librarians at an IAML conference in June 2015. Some contributors to the website expressed concerns that Guo had not properly attempted to raise donations, but without any prior warning, introduced the membership system to monetize their work.

=== Naxos Music Library ===
On April 18, 2016, the IMSLP announced on its Twitter account that all subscribers will have access to the Naxos Music Library.

=== EU server ===
On July 10, 2010, a forum thread announced the opening of a new server located in the Netherlands. This server allows works that are public domain in Canada and the EU to be downloaded legally, even if they are under copyright in the US. The server was initially run by an unaffiliated European organization, while a forum thread later announced that operations had been handed over to Project Leonardo, a new unaffiliated company incorporated in New Zealand to "provide web hosting services to online libraries that distribute free contents in any fields of arts and science". Files on the EU server are flagged (EU).

=== US server ===
A similar, also unaffiliated, US server allows users to download works that are in the public domain only in the US. Unlike the other servers, this one can only be contributed to by administrators and users who have asked for the privilege, though the files are freely accessible for download.

=== CA server ===
On July 1, 2013, a forum thread announced the opening of a new server located in Canada and operated by Project Leonardo, the unaffiliated company that also runs the EU server. This server is especially intended for users located in countries where copyright lasts 50 years from the death of the author, such as Canada, China, Japan, New Zealand, South Africa, and many others. Files on the CA server are flagged (CA).

=== WIMA merge ===
On August 23, 2011, an announcement was made that the Werner Icking Music Archive would merge with the IMSLP. WIMA had announced the merge on its own site five days before in an open letter to contributors. After working out some technical issues, the IMSLP decided to officially commence the merge on August 28. The merge was announced to be complete on July 21, 2012.

=== Current legal structure ===
IMSLP is now owned by Project Petrucci LLC, a private company created to run the website. Project Petrucci LLC was registered as a Delaware limited-liability company on June 28, 2008, when the site founder was studying at the New England Conservatory.

Project Leonardo is an internet service provider that hosts free online content in the arts or sciences.

== Similar projects ==
- Choral Public Domain Library (focused on choral and vocal music)
- Musopen (focused on recordings)
- Mutopia Project (focused on typeset scores)
- Werner Icking Music Archive (contains mainly early music; merged with the IMSLP)

== See also ==
- List of online music databases
