= RollDaBeats =

rolldabeats
- Website type: Online music database
- Available in: English
- Creators: Thijs Engels, Tom 'Haste' Johnson
- Website: www.rolldabeats.com
- Registration: Optional
- Launched: December 2001 (Tarzan), February 2005 (Rolldabeats)
- Current status: Partially live (September 2023)

Rolldabeats (branded in lowercase, as rolldabeats) is an online music database and internet forum dedicated to drum and bass and its various stylistic origins. It was launched in February 2005 by the original webmaster Thijs Engels, and web designer Tom "Haste" Johnson.

Having gone offline in November 2022, it has partially been reinstated in September 2023.

== History ==
Rolldabeats originally started in December 2001 as Tarzan, an online database of music releases compiled from Engels music collection. This soon expanded through regular contributors to the forum, especially tracklistings of mixtapes and unreleased tracks.

In February 2005, the site was redesigned by Haste, one of the contributors from the forum, and relaunched as Rolldabeats. It is co-owned by Engels and Haste and maintained by a small team of site moderators. The database grew to collate information on over 100,000 tracks released by more than 20,000 artists, and as an alternative to Discogs.

The site was nominated twice for Best Website in the Dutch Drum 'n' Bass Awards of 2006–07, losing to DnBForum.nl on both occasions, and taking joint second with 3VOOR12 in the latter. It has also promoted a series of DJ mixes titled A Decade in the Mix by various members of the site staff which illustrate the development of drum and bass in the 1990s. The site held a fundraiser on 3 November 2007, hosted by London nightclub DiTch, featuring several live sets including DJ Bailey of BBC Radio 1Xtra.

In November 2022, the site was taken offline, however in September 2023 the forum was reinstated.

== See also ==
- Discogs
- List of online music databases
