= List of online music databases =

Below is a table of online music databases that are largely free of charge. Many of the sites provide a specialized service or focus on a particular music genre. Some of these operate as an online music store or purchase referral service in some capacity. Among the sites that have information on the largest number of entities are those sites that focus on discographies of composing and performing artists.

Performance rights organisations typically have their own databases as per country they represent, in accordance with Confédération Internationale des Sociétés d'Auteurs et Compositeurs, to help domestic artists collect royalties. Information available on these portals include songwriting credits, publishing percentage splits, and alternate titles for different distribution channels. It is one of the most accurate and official types of databases because it involves direct communication between the artists, record labels, distributors, legal teams, publishers and a global governing body regulating performance rights organisations. Many countries that observe copyright have an organisation established, currently there are 119 CISAC members, and they may be not-for-profit. The databases are typically known as 'repertory searches' or 'searching works' and may require an account while others are open to view for free as public including the USA's ASCAP Songview and Ace services, Canada's SOCAN, South Korea's KOMCA, France's SACEM, and Israel's ACUM.

== General databases ==
Database	Service(s)	No. of tracks	No. of releases	No. of artists	Notes	License	Full free access
AllMusic (AMG)	Music information and reviews.	~20,000,000	~2,200,000				Song samples only.
Discogs	• Database: user-generated cross-referenced database of physical & digital releases, artists, and labels. With catalogue numbers, codes, and other markings taken directly from each release. • Companies/organisations: cross-referencing those involved in music production (record companies, manufacturers, distributors, publishers, rights holders, venues, studios, etc.) • Images: for releases, artists, labels, and other companies/organisations listed. • Marketplace: for trade of physical music releases.	151,200,000	19,391,065	9,420,968	• Multi-lingual. • Free membership (which also removes all site ads). • Marketplace lists over 35 million items (largest physical music items marketplace online). • 1 billion edits.	PD/CC0	Free API and XML data dumps.
Internet Archive	Large live music archive, hosts hundreds of free music netlabels	13,943,799				CC/PD	Yes
Jaxsta	Online database of official music credits	19,000,000			• 115,000,000+ Individual Music Credits • 100,000+ Credits Ingested Daily		API available.
Last.fm	Music community website.	~26,484,587	~3,304,568	~1,383,340	Automatically creates online library/collection of listened to music and generates recommendations.		
MusicBrainz	Open content music database.	58,884,087	5,913,891	3,036,044		CC0	Free API and XML data dumps.
Rate Your Music	Music database, community ratings, reviews and lists	27,954,325	7,487,460	1,948,076	API is planned but not functional as of August 2026.	No special rights granted. Web scraping is prohibited.	

=== Music genre specific ===
Database	Services	No. of tracks	No. of releases	No. of artists	Notes	License	Full free access
Encyclopaedia Metallum	A heavy metal encyclopedia with information, complete discography, links, images, and reviews.	4,392,794	700,867	200,184 bands; 974,613 artists			
Crispient	Hand-curated music discovery catalogue with audio excerpts, release information, discogs and youtube links, and listening guides, organised by genre and subgenre.	547 (September 2026)			Covers 25 styles across drum and bass/jungle, house, techno, hip-hop, lounge and rock, including drumfunk, atmospheric jungle, deep house, microhouse, dub techno, instrumental hip-hop, trip hop and krautrock.		Free browsing and audio excerpts; no registration required.
Prog Archives	Progressive rock discography and reviews.		87,102	13,210		No special rights granted	Yes. Log on to submit band information
RollDaBeats	Drum N Bass music database, physical releases only.	175,969	62,103				
Vkgy	Visual kei music database			16,924			

=== Specialized areas ===
Database	Specialization	Services	No. of tracks	No. of releases	No. of artists	Notes	License	Full free access
The Freesound Project	Audio samples	Repository of Creative Commons-licensed audio samples.	445,000				CC Sampling Plus.	
Genius	Lyrics	Allows users to provide annotations and interpretation of song lyrics.						
Musixmatch	Lyrics	Synced lyrics and lyrics provider to Digital Streaming Services						Yes.
SecondHandSongs	Covers	User-generated database of covers and samples of songs, with links to public recordings.	>1,100,000 performances	>100,000 works		Multilingual recordings.	No special rights granted	
Sound Credit	Credits	Multimodal platform for entering and editing music credits with a datahub that includes a database upload option.						Database uploads are free, and is free to view.
WhoSampled	Sample identification	User-generated database of comparison between original tracks and covers, remixes, or songs that use samples.	1,100,000		338,000			

== Printed music (sheets) databases ==
Database	Services	No. of tracks	No. of releases	No. of artists	Notes	License	Full free access
Choral Public Domain Library	Sheet music archive of choral and vocal music in the public domain or otherwise freely available for printing and performing	36,869					Yes
International Music Score Library Project	Music scores and parts, mostly scanned from publications now in the public domain; some recordings.	42,000 (370,000 scores)		14,500 composers, 387 performers.		PD/CC BY-NC-SA.	
MuseScore	Sheet music	6,487,223		780	Also includes free music notation software to enable a wide range of instrumental music scores to be created, printed and shared	Music is available under a variety of licenses. It is tagged and searchable by license.	Music protected by copyright is only downloadable by obtaining a paid Pro subscription.
Musipedia	Search by melody (entering notes, Parsons code, whistling, or tapping rhythm)						Yes, but via other sources.
Mutopia Project	Repository of free content sheet music.	2,247		328			
Répertoire International des Sources Musicales (RISM)	Database of historical music manuscripts and music printed editions that includes full descriptions and current physical locations in libraries worldwide.		>1,400,000	~40,000 composers	Search available in 5 languages. Link to digitized images when available.	CC BY	Yes

== Metadata providers and distributors ==
Database	Services	No. of tracks	No. of releases	No. of artists	Notes	License	Full free access
ACRCloud	Music recognition & audio based music retrieval	~40,000,000			Commercially available with SDKs, APIs for file scanning, airplay monitoring, shazam-liked features		Free trial available in 15 days
Gracenote	Identification service for CDs and other media.	~100,000,000	~8,000,000		1 billion "submissions".		
Quantone	Database of physical/digital products, venues, photos, artists, participants, composers, movements, labels, publishers and rights.	12,000,000		301,000	For commercial business-to-business usage only.		API available.

== Non-functioning databases ==
Database	Services	No. of tracks	No. of releases	No. of artists	Notes
freedb	Identification service for CDs.				Licensed under GPL. freedb.org and its services shut down in June 2020; succeeded by gnudb.org.
LyricWiki	Lyrics wiki on Fandom.	~1,653,416	~159,749	~82,226	Founded in 2006, API-restricted since 2016, closed in 2019. Deleted in September 2020.
MetroLyrics	Lyrics lookup.	1,000,000+		16,000+	The site abruptly went offline in late June 2021, and as of November 2022 its owners and maintainers have made no explanation.
MusicMight	Biographies and discographies.	659,000	92,000	59,400	Was active from 2005-2010.
Wikifonia	Free lead sheets in MusicXML format, contributed and editable by users.	6,236			Was active from 2006-2013.

== See also ==
- Automatic content recognition
- Comparison of digital music stores
- List of music sharing websites
- Comparison of music streaming services
- Comparison of online music lockers
- List of music software
- List of Internet radio stations
- List of online digital musical document libraries
- Streaming media
- Virtual Library of Musicology
