= Denemo =

Scorewriter and music sequencer

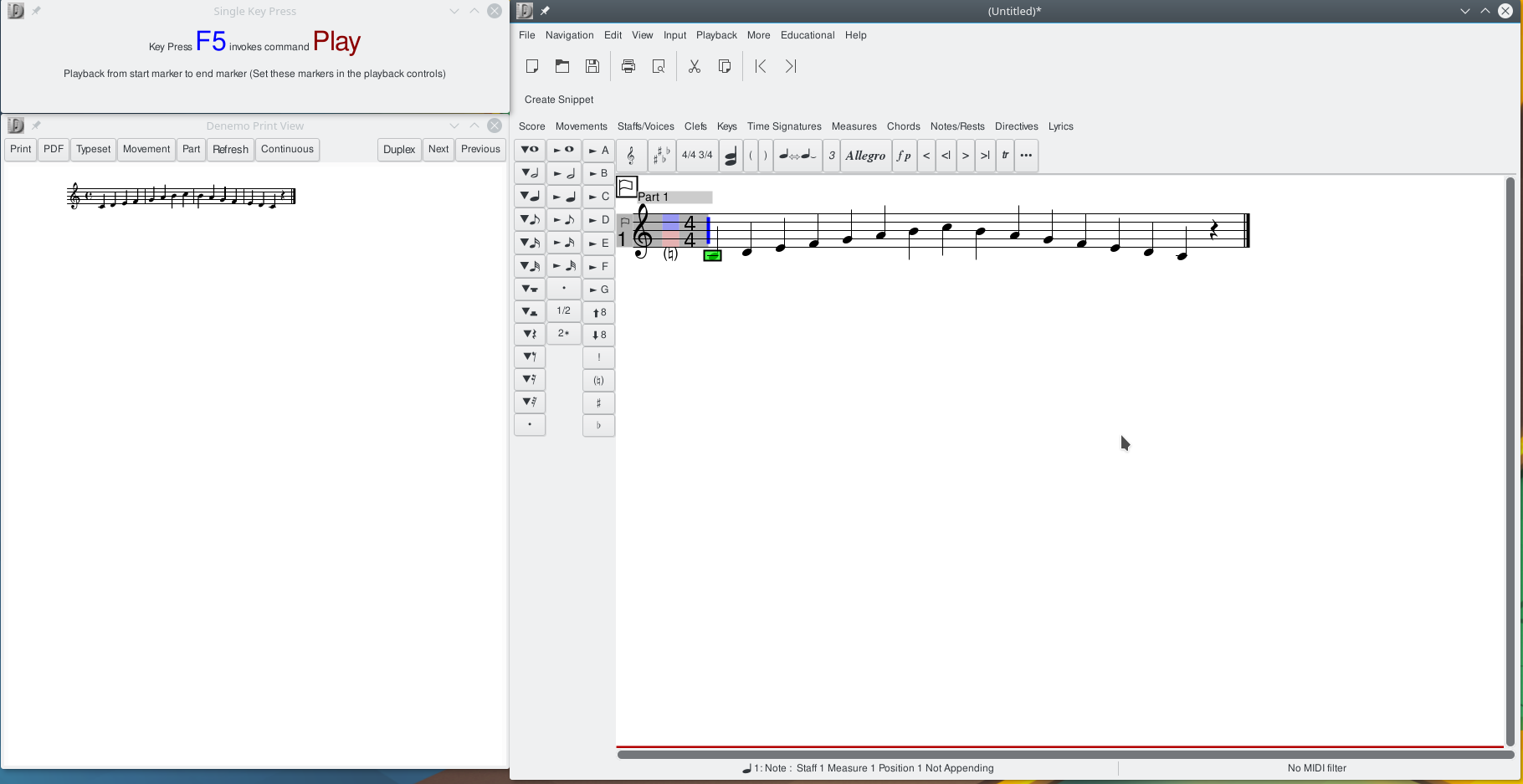
- Denemo 2.0.14 under Linux
- Developers: Richard Shann, Jeremiah Benham, Éloi Rivard
- Stable release: 2.6.0 (11 March 2022; 4 years ago) [±]
- Operating system: Linux, Windows, macOS
- Type: Scorewriter, music sequencer
- License: GPL-3.0-or-later
- Website: denemo.org
- Repository: git.savannah.gnu.org/cgit/denemo.git

Denemo is a free and open-source scorewriter for Linux, macOS and Windows. It provides a graphical interface for entering and editing musical notation. The program is distributed under the GNU General Public License.

Denemo helps prepare notation for publishing and lets a user rapidly enter notation, simultaneously typesetting via the LilyPond music engraver. Music can be typed in using a PC keyboard, taken from MIDI input, or played into a microphone plugged into a soundcard. The program plays back via an internal sampler and can act as a JACK/MIDI client. Denemo includes scripts to run music tests and practice exercises for educational purposes.

== History ==
Matthew Hiller began developing Denemo in 1999 as a graphical front end for LilyPond. In 2001, he handed the project over to Adam Tee. In a 2006 account of its development, Dave Phillips noted that the small development team also had to keep pace with changes to LilyPond, which sometimes slowed work on Denemo.

== Features ==
Music can be entered using a computer keyboard, a MIDI controller or microphone input. Denemo separates its notation-entry display from the score typeset by LilyPond, which can be generated in the background. It also allows rhythms and pitches to be entered in separate passes. Supported notation includes tablature, chord charts, fret diagrams and percussion notation.

The typeset view permits adjustments to the positioning of notation and the shapes of slurs and ties. For transcription, positions in a score can be linked to locations in a source PDF, such as a scanned manuscript. Audio recordings can also be synchronized with the notation and played alongside it to check for discrepancies.

Denemo supports importing MusicXML, MIDI and LilyPond files. Export formats include LilyPond, PDF, MIDI, WAV, Ogg and PNG. It can print either a full score or individual instrumental parts.

The program can be extended using Scheme scripts. Recorded command sequences and custom scripts can be assigned keyboard shortcuts or added to menus and palettes. Educational features include notation-reading and interval-recognition exercises, as well as figured bass exercises.

== Reception ==
In a 2009 review for Linux Journal, Dave Phillips highlighted Denemo's keyboard-driven workflow and Scheme extensibility. He noted that earlier releases had suffered from instability and a difficult learning curve, but found that stability had improved and that more documentation and examples were available.

== See also ==
- List of music software
