= Mutopia Project =

Volunteer-run library of free content sheet music

- Website type: Music score library
- Available in: English
- Website: www.mutopiaproject.org
- Commercial: No
- Registration: No
- Launched: 2000
- Content license: Creative Commons Attribution / Share-Alike

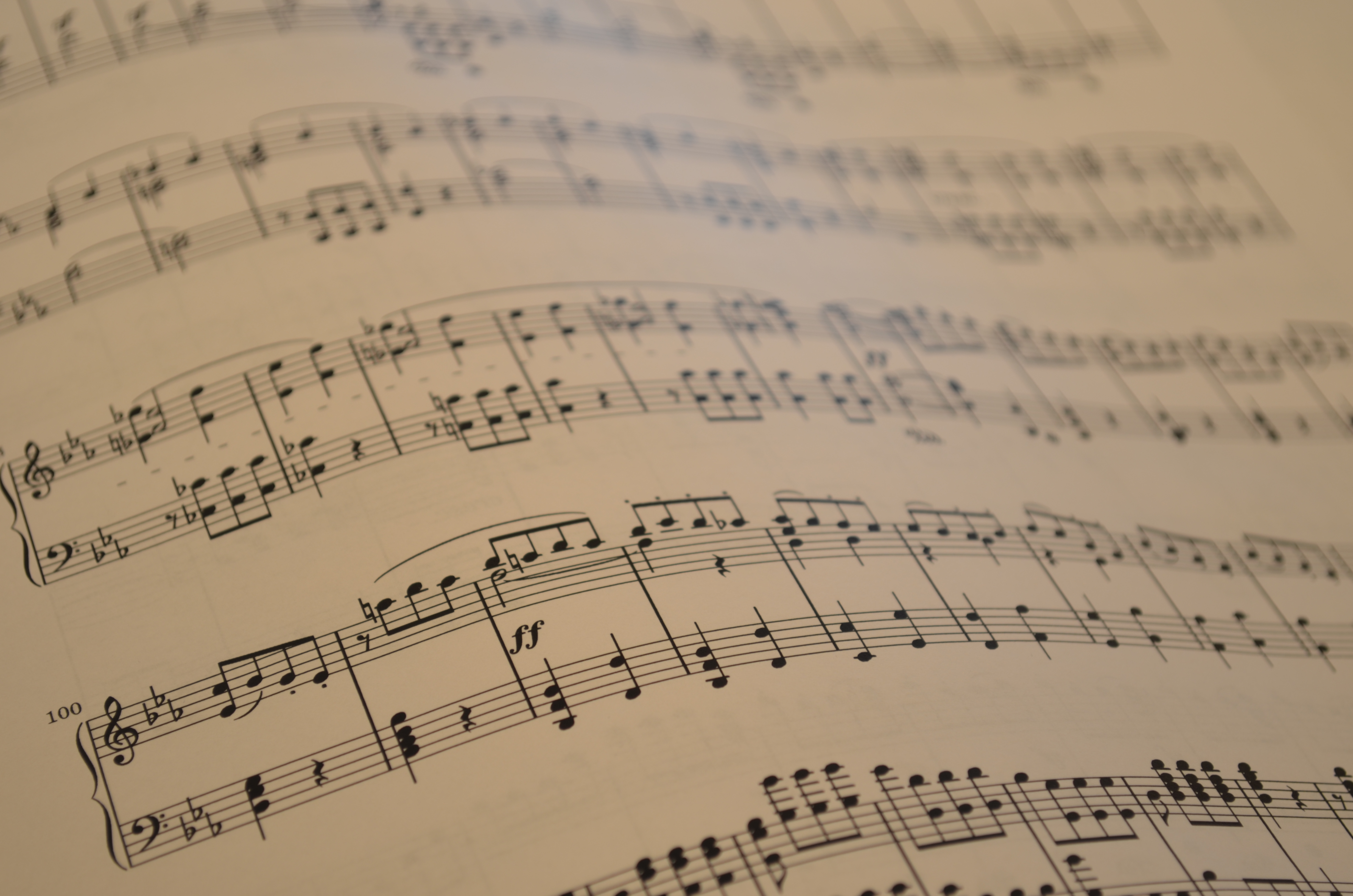
Symphony No. 5 of Ludwig van Beethoven, music sheet released by the Mutopia Project

The Mutopia Project is a volunteer-run effort to create a library of free content sheet music, in a way similar to Project Gutenberg's library of public domain books. It started in 2000.

The music is reproduced from old scores that are in the public domain. New scores are digitally typeset with GNU LilyPond and distributed in the following formats:

- PDF format in both letter and A4 paper sizes for printing,
- MIDI for aural reproduction, and
- LilyPond source code format.

As of 2024, there are 2124 pieces of music available, over a third of which are for piano.

== See also ==
- List of online music databases
- Public domain resources
- Open music
- International Music Score Library Project, a similar music cataloging project, that collects both typeset and scanned scores.
- Werner Icking Music Archive
- Choral Public Domain Library
