= Helmholtz pitch notation =

System for naming musical notes

The naming of individual Cs using the Helmholtz system

Helmholtz pitch notation is a system for naming musical notes of the Western chromatic scale. Fully described and normalized by the German scientist Hermann von Helmholtz, it uses a combination of upper and lower case letters (A to G), (Note: In German musical text, the letter B is used to designate a standard B♭, whereas H is used for B♮.) and the sub- and super-prime symbols ( ͵ ′ or _{⸜} ^{⸝}) to denote each individual note of the scale. It is one of two formal systems for naming notes in a particular octave, the other being scientific pitch notation. (Note: Scientific pitch notation is a similar system that replaces primes and sub-primes with integers. Hence in scientific notation, middle C (Helmholtz c′) is either C_{4} or C4.)

== History ==
Helmholtz proposed this system in order to accurately define pitches in his classical work on acoustics Die Lehre von den Tonempfindungen als physiologische Grundlage für die Theorie der Musik (1863) translated into English by A.J. Ellis as On the Sensations of Tone (1875). (Note: In the German edition of the book, Helmholtz wrote: "German musicians denote the pitches of the higher octaves by accents (strichelungen)". Ellis noted that "English works use strokes above and below the letters, which are typographically inconvenient. Hence the German notation is retained.")

Helmholtz based his notation on the practice of German organ builders for labelling their pipes, itself derived from the old German organ tablature in use from late medieval times until the early 18th century. His system is widely used by musicians across Europe and is the one used in the New Grove Dictionary. Once also widely used by scientists and doctors when discussing the scientific and medical aspects of sound in relation to the auditory system, it has now been replaced in the US in scientific and medical contexts by scientific pitch notation.

== Use ==
The accenting of the scale in Helmholtz notation always starts on the note C and ends at B (e.g. C D E F G A B). The note C is shown in different octaves by using upper-case letters for low notes, and lower-case letters for high notes, and adding sub-primes and primes in the following sequence: C͵͵ C͵ C c c′ c″ c‴ (or ,,C ,C C c c′ c″ c‴ or C_{⸜⸜} C_{⸜} C c c^{⸝} c^{⸝⸝} c^{⸝⸝⸝}) and so on.

Middle C is designated c′, therefore the octave from middle C upwards is c′–b′.

=== Variations ===
Octave	Helmholtz	Helmholtz (English)	Helmholtz (numbered)	ABC	Lilypond	SPN
	C͵͵ or ͵͵C	CCC	C_{2} or _{2}C	C,,,,	c,,,	C_{0}
	C͵ or ͵C	CC	C_{1} or _{1}C	C,,,	c,,	C_{1}
	C	C	C	C,,	c,	C_{2}
	c	c	c	C,	c	C_{3}
	c′	c′	c^{1}	C	c'	C_{4}
	c′′	c′′	c^{2}	c	c''	C_{5}
	c′′′	c′′′	c^{3}	c'	c'''	C_{6}
	c′′′′	c′′′′	c^{4}	c''	c''''	C_{7}
	c′′′′′	c′′′′′	c^{5}	c'''	c'''''	C_{8}

- The English multiple-letter notation uses repeated Cs in place of the sub-prime symbol. Therefore C͵ is rendered as CC ; C͵͵ as CCC ; etc. This notation has appeared in some part names for contrabass instruments, for example, the "CC Contrabass Tuba" or the "BB♭ Contrabass Clarinet".
- The English strokes notation replaces subscript-primes with underlines and superscript primes with overlines: C͵͵ is rendered as C͇ ; C͵ as C ; c′ as c̄ and c″ as c̿ ; etc. Because the typesetting is difficult this notation has fallen out of use.
- Primes in subscript and superscript may be replaced with digits, indicating the number of primes. (Note: See article Tonsymbol and references in the German Wikipedia.) For example, ͵͵C can be written as C_{2} or _{2}C, and c″ written as c^{2} (but not ^{2}c). (Note: The variant Helmholtz notation with number-subscripts is problematic, since it is easily confused with scientific pitch notation.)
- A system of pitch designation using uppercase and lowercase letters, commas and apostrophes, formally identical to Helmholtz pitch notation but shifted by two octaves, is used for ABC notation. (Note: The ABC music notation system is used mainly for documenting Western folk music as plain text files, and as a musical notation exchange format.) In ABC, the notes C, and C (middle C) and c represent Helmholtz c and c′ and c″ respectively.
- LilyPond music publishing software uses an all-lowercase variant, also with commas and apostrophes, where pitches that would be uppercase in Helmholtz notation are written in lowercase with an additional sub-prime. Thus, c,,, and c,, and c, represent Helmholtz C͵͵ and C͵ and C respectively.

== Octave and staff representation ==
Whole octaves may also be given a name based on "English strokes notation". For example, the octave from c′–b′ is called the one-line octave or (less common) once-accented octave. Correspondingly, the notes in the octave may be called one-lined C (for c′), etc.

This diagram gives examples of the lowest and highest note in each octave, giving their name in the Helmholtz system, and the "German method" of octave nomenclature. (The octave below the contra octave is known as the sub-contra octave.)

== See also ==
- Scientific pitch notation
