= Decebal (name) =

Decebal is a Romanian male given name. Notable people with the name include:

- Decebal Gheară (born 1978), Romanian footballer
- Decebal Traian Remeș (1949–2020), Romanian economist and politician
