= Musopen =

Public domain classical music collection

Musopen.org

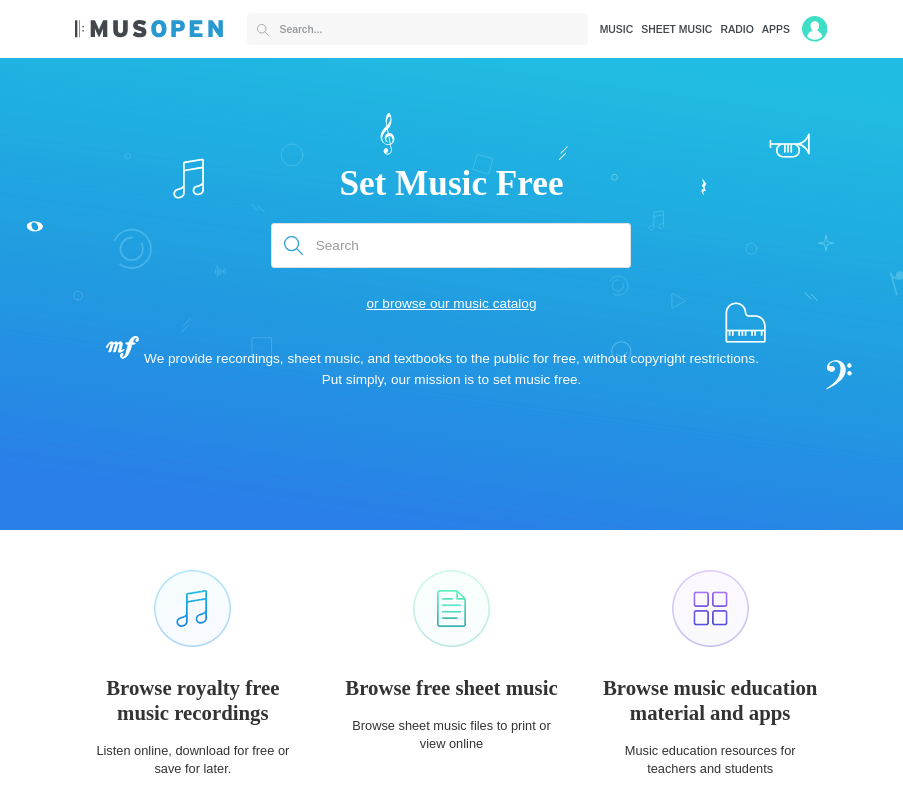
- The Musopen homepage as of 2025
- Owner: Musopen.org
- Creator: Aaron Dunn
- Website: musopen.org
- Commercial: Freemium
- Launched: May 2006 (20 years ago)

Musopen is an organization which creates, produces and disseminates Western classical music, via public domain recordings, sheet music and educational resources. It has been favorably compared to IMSLP and stands with ChoralWiki and the Wind Repertory Project as among the most prominent online music databases.

Founded by Aaron Dunn in 2006, the site operates out of Palo Alto, California as a 501(c)(3) nonprofit organization. It rose to prominence amid a viral crowdfunding Kickstarter campaign in 2010, which raised US$68,359 to record a wide variety of orchestral and chamber works. Other commissioning projects include the complete Beethoven piano sonatas and the complete works of Frédéric Chopin.

== Overview ==
Musopen, under the URL musopen.org, is a 501(c)(3) nonprofit organization which prioritizes "improving access and exposure to music by creating free resources and educational materials". The website creates, produces and disseminates public domain music via recordings, sheet music and educational resources concerning Western classical music. It currently operates out of Palo Alto, California, although is also maintains an address in Tarzana, Los Angeles, CA.

It describes its mission as "to set music free". Although much Western classical music—particularly before the 20th century—is in public domain, most recordings are copyrighted. This causes a variety of limitations: reduced transmission and sharing; few opportunities to create remixes or mashups; and difficulty in use for the soundtracks of films and videos. The alternative use of early 20th-century recordings, which have passed their copyright expiration, is often not ideal since the sound is often low-quality. Music education scholar Evan S. Tobias noted that "Musopen's initiative of recording music and making it available with creative commons licensing speaks to an era in which people wish to interact, engage, and participate with music beyond its consumption. Furthermore it serves as a model for musicians and ensembles with the means to do the same".

Musopen operates under a freemium model, in that some content is available free of charge, but premium downloads (HD) require a subscription. Non-paying users can download music recordings but are restricted to 5 downloads per day; members paying $55 per year receive unlimited downloads of losslessly encoded music. Music from the site has since found its way into a wide variety of media, including TV shows, films, Wikipedia articles, and use in the One Laptop per Child project.

== History ==
Musopen was created by music producer Aaron Dunn (born 1983), then a bassoonist attending Skidmore College of Saratoga Springs, New York. After witnessing that the school "janitors would take trash bags filled with the recordings we’d made and throw them out", he researched domain law and concluded that an online repository for public domain classical music was feasible. Dun founded the site in May 2006, although he noted that initially "it went nowhere". The site attracted more attention in 2008, when it commissioned recordings of Ludwig van Beethoven's 32 piano sonatas for public domain release. By May 2008, the site included 100 pieces and a now-obsolete "bidding system", where users could pay money towards the recording of specific works.

In 2010, Musopen received considerably more attention; the music critic Jim Farber remarked that it became an "overwhelming hit (literally and figuratively)". It attracted significant media coverage, amid its organization of a major fundraiser via Kickstarter to commission recordings of a larger repertoire. The fundraiser looked to record the symphonies of Beethoven, Brahms, Tchaikovsky and Sibelius, alongside a plethora of chamber music for public domain dissemination. The project raised a total of US$68,359, more than six times their initial target of US$11,000. The Czech Philharmonic was commissioned to record the works; in July 2012, Musopen announced that the editing of the recordings was finished, after which the audio files were uploaded both to its website and Archive.org. The final list of music was announced in August 2012, and included Beethoven's 3rd Symphony, the piano sonatas of Franz Schubert, Brahms's four symphonies, string quartets by Mozart, and a variety of other orchestral and chamber works.

In September 2013, a second Kickstarter fundraiser was launched by Musopen to record the complete works of Frédéric Chopin. The fundraiser was successful, exceeding the funding goal of US$75,000 by over US$15,000.

Musopen stands with ChoralWiki and the Wind Repertory Project as among the most prominent online music repertoire databases. It has been compared favorably to both Wikipedia and IMSLP. It has also been likened to the Open Goldberg Variations, a crowdfunded project by Robert Douglass and pianist Kimiko Douglass-Ishizaka, to create a copyright-free recording of J.S. Bach's complete Goldberg Variations. In 2022, Business Insider ranked it among the "5 best websites for downloading public domain music", alongside FreePD, Free Music Archive, Open Music Archive and Mubert Render.
