= Keyboard tablature =

Form of musical notation for keyboard instruments

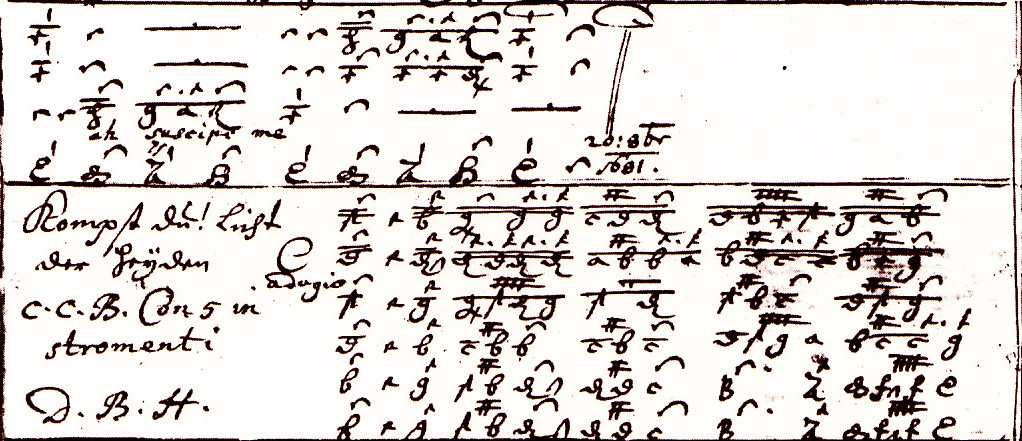
An example: Dieterich Buxtehude's O dulcis Jesu (BuxWV 83) in full score using tablature

Keyboard tablature is a form of musical notation for keyboard instruments. Widely used in some parts of Europe from the 15th century, it co-existed with, and was eventually replaced by modern staff notation in the 18th century. The defining characteristic of the best known type, German organ tablature, is the use of letters (Note: Although letters are by far the most common method, numbers are also a possibility. See Colton 2010 for the description of an English example, or Encyclopedia Britannica 2018 for a description of Spanish keyboard tablature.) to indicate pitch (with added stems or loops to indicate accidentals) as well as beams for rhythm. Spain and Portugal used a slightly different cipher tablature, called cifra.

== Historical details ==
The earliest extant music manuscripts written in German tablature date from the first half of the 15th century, with the oldest example, a German manuscript dating from 1432, containing the earliest known setting of a partial organ mass as well as a piece based on a cantus firmus. These manuscripts used letters (the same as today) to identify pitch, with the upper voice typically written on a staff in mensural notation. This style was also present in other German-speaking areas, such as Austria. These manuscripts contain valuable information as to the evolution of the music from the period, with extensive evidence of the influence of vocal, and later dance music, on early instrumental music. This practice which could still be seen in collections from the 16th century eventually led to the full-fledged Baroque dance suites of later centuries. This hybrid tablature was also featured in some early printed music books, such as Arnolt Schlick’s Tabulaturen etlicher Lobgesang und Lidlein of 1512.

Later notation that included the upper voice in letters as well became prevalent in the latter part of the 16th century. Even works published in open score, such as Samuel Scheidt's Tablatura Nova (1624), may have been influenced by the strict vertical alignment of so-called "new German organ tablature". Remaining in use in Germany (and neighboring areas, such as modern-day Hungary or Poland) through the time of Bach, the music of some composers of the period remains available only in manuscript tablature format. The last use of this style of notation is in Johann Samuel Petri’s Anleitung zur praktischen Musik (1782).

In France, England and Italy, staff notation was the norm, and while there are isolated examples of tablature from England (the 14c Robertsbridge codex), there is no evidence that such use was as widespread as in Germany.

== Notation ==
=== North German tablature ===
The use of tablature was not limited to solely keyboard music: many vocal works of the period, notably in the Düben collection, survive in this format.

=== Iberian cipher notation ===
Juan Bermudo's Declaración de instrumentos musicales (1555) introduced two tablatures, one assigning numerals from 1 to 42 to each key of the organ, and the second counting white keys only from 1 to 23. Only a third method of cifra was widely adopted however: introduced in Venegas de Henestrosa's Libro de cifra nueva (1557), and later used in Cabezón’s Obras de música (1578), it used 1-7 with together accidentals; slashes lower the octave and superscript dots raise it.

== Bibliography ==
- Apel, Willi (1937), "Early German Keyboard Music", The Musical Quarterly, 23 (2): 210–237, doi:10.1093/mq/xxiii.2.210, ISSN 0027-4631, JSTOR 738677
- Apel, Willi (1961), The notation of polyphonic music, 900-1600 (4th ed.), Cambridge, Massachusetts: Medieval Academy of America
- Baron, John H. (July 1967), "A 17th-Century Keyboard Tablature in Brasov", Journal of the American Musicological Society, 20 (2): 279–285, doi:10.2307/830790, JSTOR 830790
- Benson, Joan (2014), "Exploring the Past: Fifteenth through Seventeenth Centuries", Clavichord for Beginners, Indiana University Press, pp. 68–82, ISBN 9780253011589, JSTOR j.ctt16gzjxk.10
- Boe, John; Godwin, Joscelyn (1974), "Playing from Original Notation", Early Music, 2 (3): 199–201, doi:10.1093/earlyj/2.3.199, ISSN 0306-1078, JSTOR 3125580
- Braatz, Thomas (1 September 2006), "BWV 1121 - Organ Tablature", www.bach-cantatas.com
- Crane, Frederick (July 1965), "15th-Century Keyboard Music in Vienna MS 5094", Journal of the American Musicological Society, 18 (2): 237–243, doi:10.2307/830688, JSTOR 830688
- Colton, Lisa (2010), "A Unique Source of English Tablature from Seventeenth-Century Huddersfield", Music & Letters, 91 (1): 39–50, doi:10.1093/ml/gcp081, ISSN 0027-4224, JSTOR 40539093
- "Tablature", Encyclopedia Britannica, 2018
- Emery, Walter (October 1938), "The Orgelbuchlein: Some Textual Matters: I. Readings of the tablature in 'Christus, der uns selig macht'", The Musical Times, 79 (1148): 770–771, doi:10.2307/923787, JSTOR 923787
- Gaare, Mark (March 1997), "Alternatives to Traditional Notation", Music Educators Journal, 83 (5): 17–23, doi:10.2307/3399003, JSTOR 3399003, S2CID 144806718
- Godwin, Joscelyn (1974), "Playing from Original Notation", Early Music, 2 (1): 15–19, doi:10.1093/earlyj/2.1.15, ISSN 0306-1078, JSTOR 3125877
- Jackson, Roland (July 1971), "[Letter from Roland Jackson]", Journal of the American Musicological Society, 24 (2): 318, doi:10.2307/830503, JSTOR 830503
- Johnston, Gregory S. (1998), "Polyphonic Keyboard Accompaniment in the Early Baroque: An Alternative to Basso Continuo", Early Music, 26 (1): 51–64, doi:10.1093/earlyj/XXVI.1.51, ISSN 0306-1078, JSTOR 3128548
- King, A. Hyatt (1962), "The Organ Tablature of Johann Woltz", The British Museum Quarterly, 25 (3/4): 61–63, doi:10.2307/4422744, JSTOR 4422744
- Nanni, Matteo; Moths, Angelika, "How do tablatures work? - From Ink to Sound", FutureLearn, University of Basel
- Papp, Ágnes (1 August 2005), "Orgeltabulaturen des 17. Jahrhunderts aus Ungarn: Intavolierung, Reduktion, Notationsarten" [Hungarian organ tablatures from the 17th century: Intabulation, reduction, notation types], Studia Musicologica Academiae Scientiarum Hungaricae (in German), 46 (3): 441–469, doi:10.1556/SMus.46.2005.3-4.9, JSTOR 25164477
- Rifkin, Joshua (April 1969), "[Letter from Joshua Rifkin]", Journal of the American Musicological Society, 22 (1): 142, doi:10.2307/830826, JSTOR 830826
- Smith, David J. (2009), "Early Seventeenth-Century Keyboard Culture at the Court of the Archdukes in Brussels: The Manuscript Kraków, Biblioteka Jagiellońska, Mus. MS 40316", Revue belge de Musicologie / Belgisch Tijdschrift voor Muziekwetenschap, 63: 67–98, ISSN 0771-6788, JSTOR 25746578
- Tuck, Mary Lynn (1966), "Tablature Notation in the Sixteenth Century", Music Educators Journal, 53 (1): 121–123, doi:10.2307/3390828, ISSN 0027-4321, JSTOR 3390828, S2CID 191320043
- Wollny, Peter; Maul, Micheal (2008), "The Weimar Organ Tablature: Bach's Earliest Autographs" (PDF), Understanding Bach, 3: 67–74

== See also ==
- Tablature
- Klavarskribo
- Piano roll
