= Quantone =

Quantone Ltd
- Founded: January 2010
- Headquarters: London, England
- Products: Music Intelligence Platform
- Website: quantonemusic.com

Quantone, formerly known as Decibel Music Systems, is a London-based music intelligence software company that provides rich, semantic music metadata to developers and media companies. Quantone uses technology derived from intelligence gathering services to allow for deeply connected data, storing information on not only artists and their recorded works, but also the relationships between them. In addition to album title, track titles, and the length of each track, Quantone compiles the producers, engineers, session musicians, copyright information, and more. In 2015 Quantone added music recommendations to their product range, announcing a collaboration with IBM's cognitive computing platform, Watson. Quantone also addresses special issues, such as multiple names and languages, as well as sympathetic treatment of classical music, world music and jazz.

== History ==
Quantone was founded in 2010 by Gregory Kris, Adrian Corbett, and Evan Stein as Decibel Music Systems. A musicologist by training, Stein worked as a programmer for the New York County District Attorney's office, designing intelligence-gathering systems for law enforcement. He then served as the Director of Application Development at Standard & Poor’s, developing large-scale databases for cross-functional use. In 2005, he combined his passion for music with his technical skills and began developing the preliminary architecture of the database. Decibel Music Systems Ltd was then incorporated in 2010 alongside partners Adrian Corbett and Gregory Kris. Kris resigned as CEO in 2013.

In 2011, it was one of MidemNet Lab's finalists. In 2014, they were a Top 20 finalist at the Webit Congress - Founders Games in Istanbul.

In 2015 Decibel signed a contract with IBM to develop a music recommendations system using Watson, IBM’s cognitive computing platform, widely acclaimed for winning the game-show Jeopardy! in 2011. In 2015 Stein, the CEO said of the collaboration “The Watson project will enable us to provide even more information based on people’s observations of the music and opinion”. In 2015 the company also changed its name to Quantone.

== Product and clients ==
Quantone gathers music data through data-mining, web crawling, and manual input to produce a total of 100 fields of metadata for any given track. This database serves as the main product line for the company. The company has also worked closely with Colin Larkin, author of the Encyclopedia of Popular Music.

Customers include music sites, artist royalty collectors, record labels and independent music applications, such as Jugglit and EMI's BlueNote App in collaboration with Groovebug.

Quantone released version 3 of their API in late 2014.

Quantone is in private ownership.
