= Tacet =

Musical term

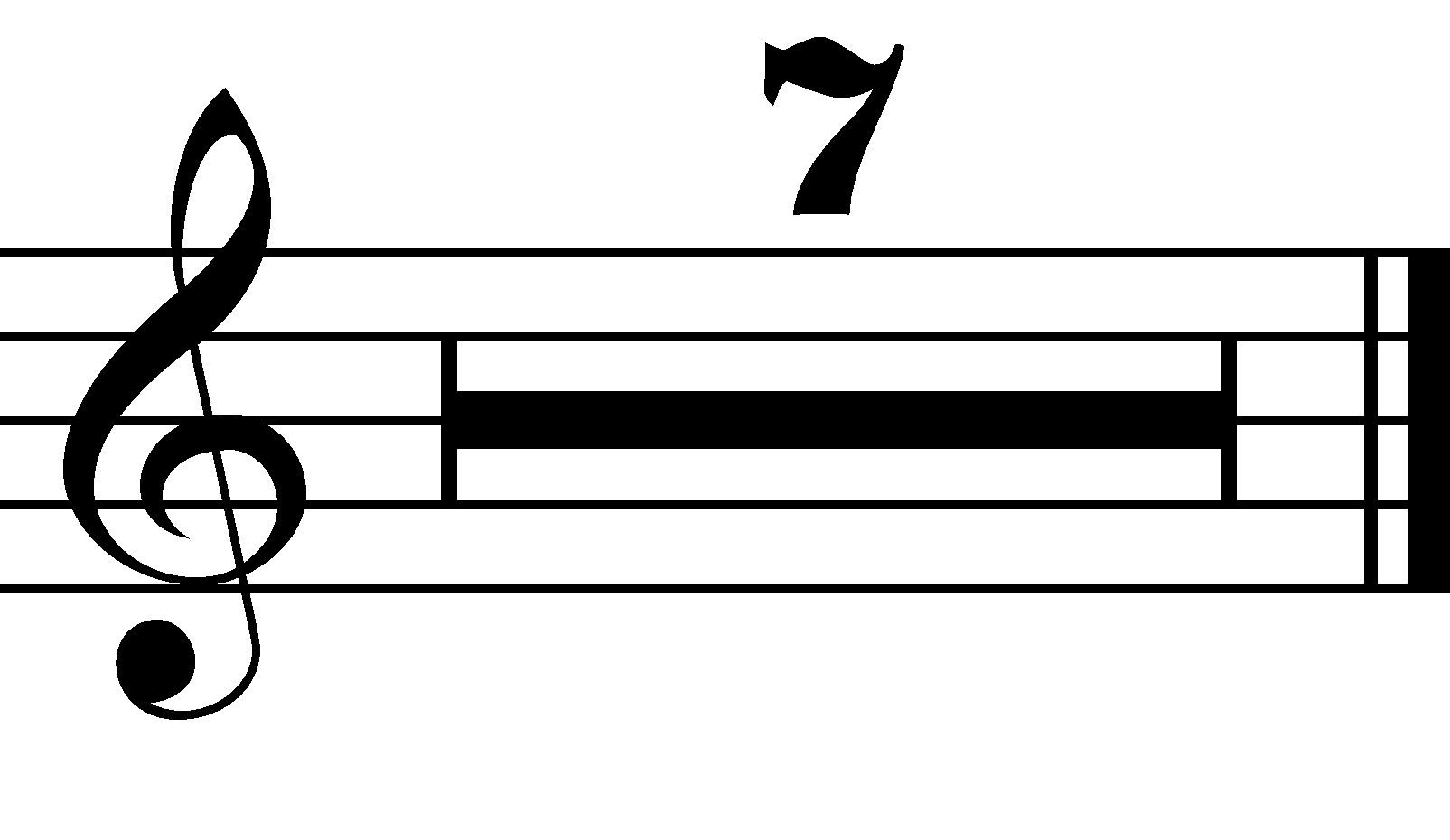
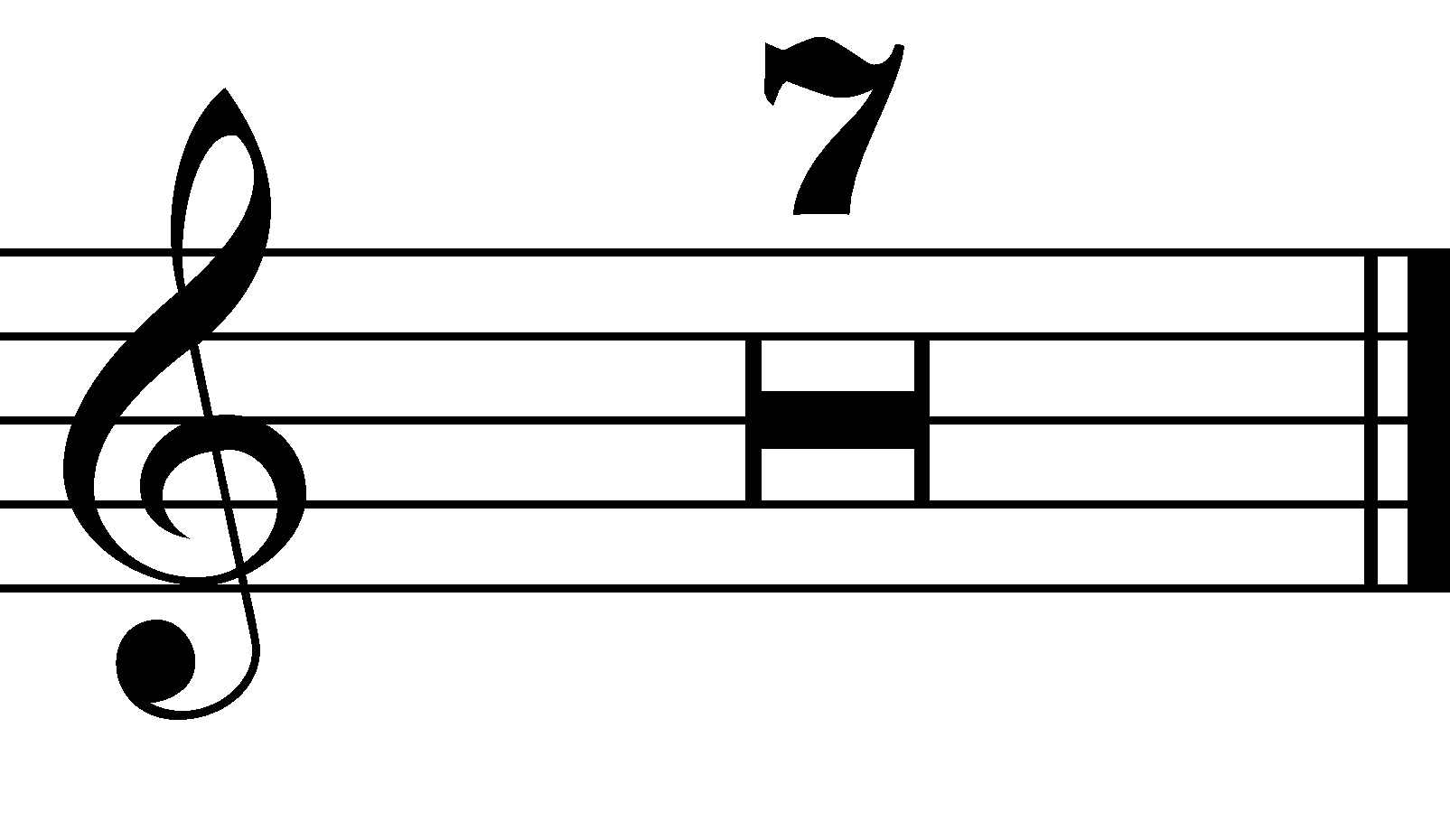
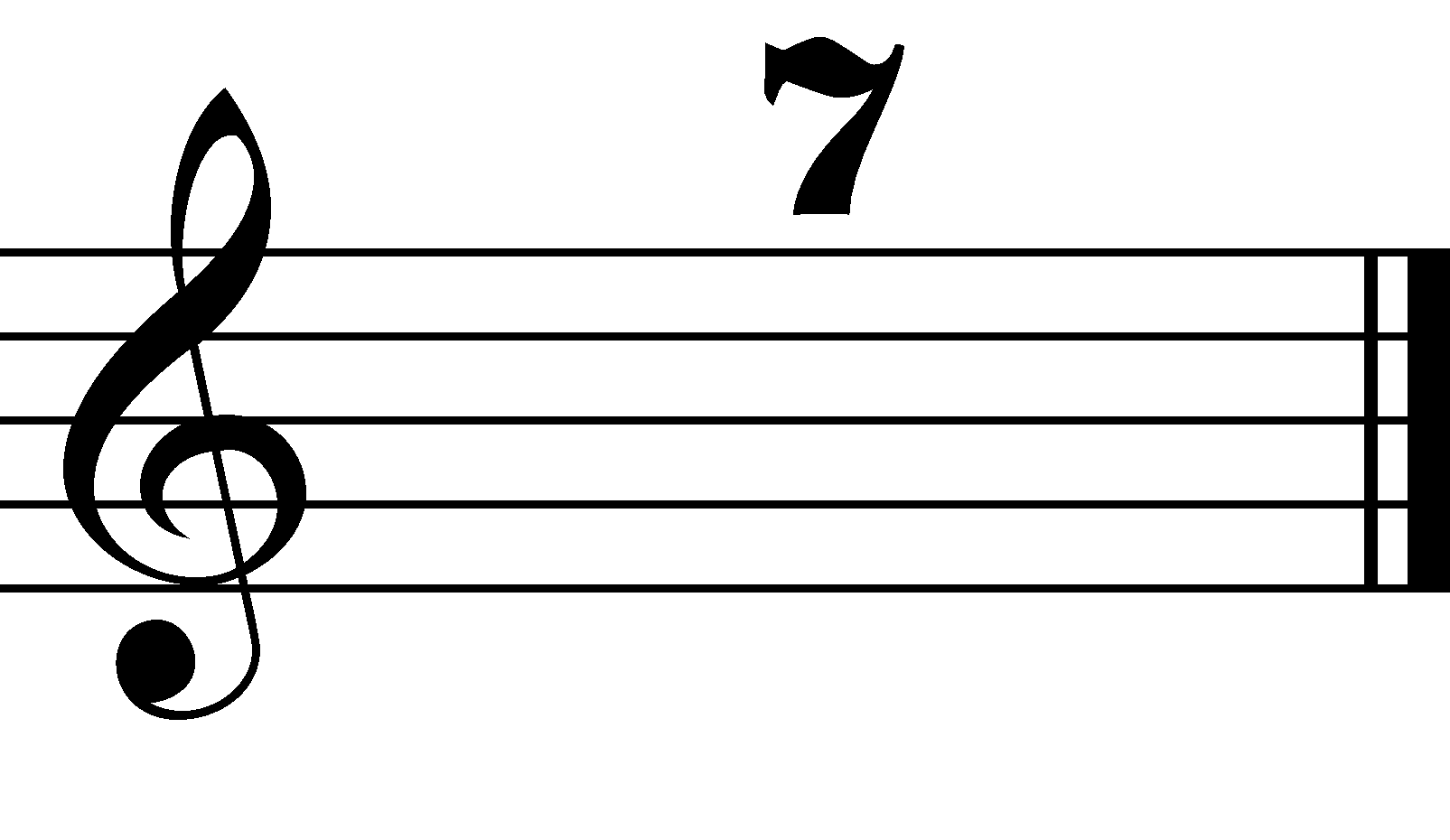
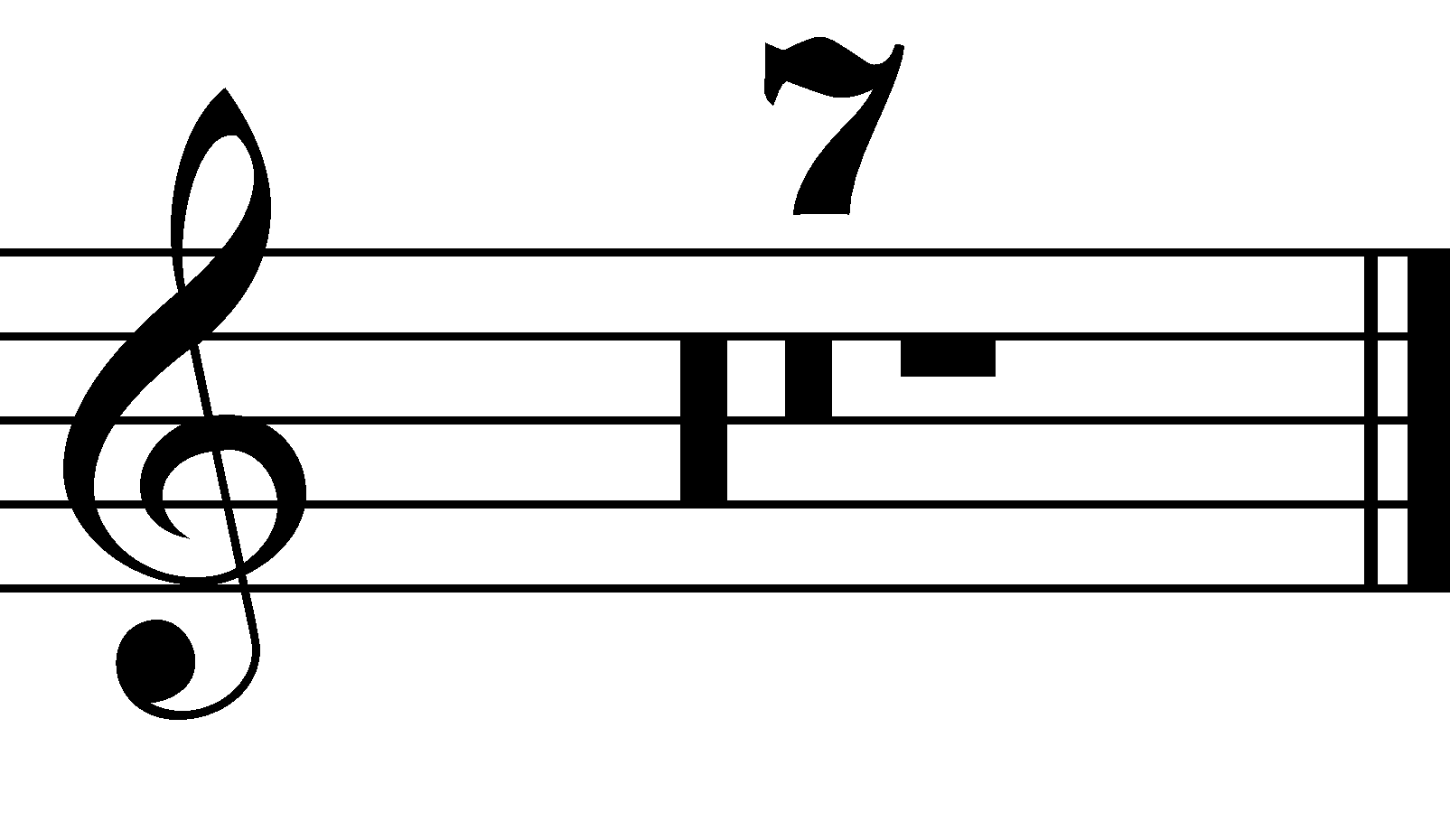
Seven measure multirest, notated variously

Tacet is Latin which translates literally into English as "(it) is silent" (pronounced: /ˈteɪsɪt/, /ˈtæsɪt/, or /ˈtɑːkɛt/). It is a musical term to indicate that an instrument or voice does not sound, also known as a rest. In vocal polyphony and in orchestral scores, it usually indicates a long period of time, typically an entire movement. In more modern music such as jazz, tacet tends to mark considerably shorter breaks. Multirests, or multiple-measure rests, are rests which last multiple measures (or multiple rests, each of which lasts an entire measure).

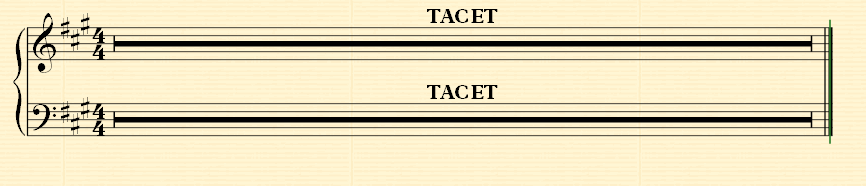
How a tacet appears on sheet music

Tacet. (Lat.) A word by which the performer is to understand that the instrument with the name of which it is conjoined is to be silent: a Violino Tacet; the violin is not to play: Oboe Tacet; the oboe is silent.

— Thomas Busby (1827)

It was common for early symphonies to leave out the brass or percussion in certain movements, especially in slow (second) movements, and this is the instruction given in the parts for the player to wait until the end of the movement.

How multirests used to be notated (see longa, breve, and semibreve)

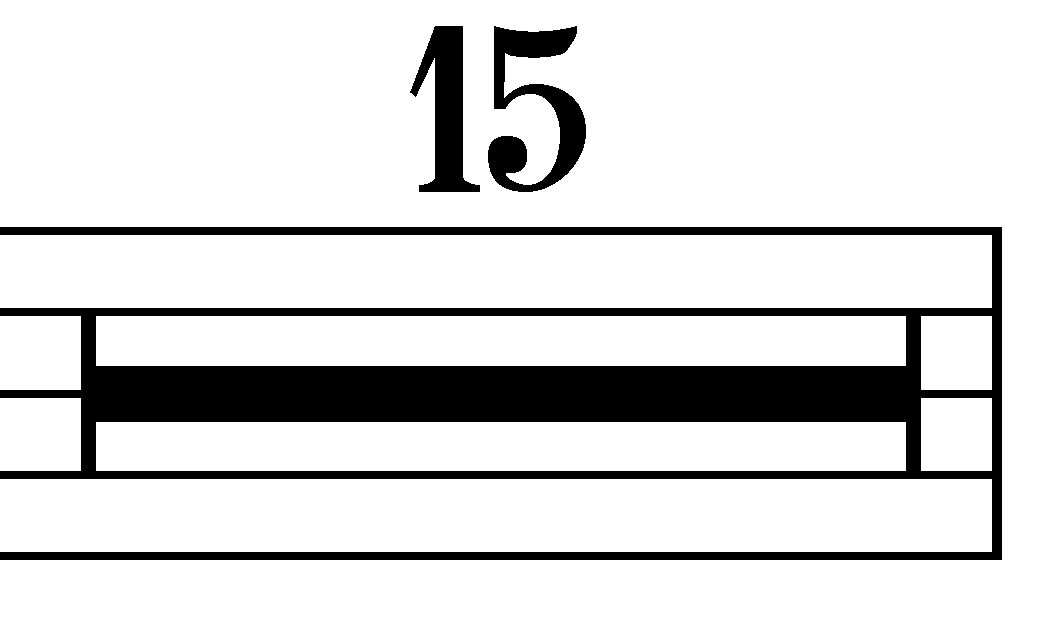
How multirests are now notated, known as the H-bar (which may be narrow, leaving room for things such as an anacrusis to be written in)

It is also commonly used in accompaniment music to indicate that the instrument does not play on a certain run through a portion of the music, e.g. "Tacet 1st time." The phrase tacet al fine is used to indicate that the performer should remain silent for the remainder of the piece (or portion thereof), and need not, for example, count rests.

Tacet may be appropriate when a particular instrument/voice/section, "is to rest for an entire section, movement, or composition." "Partial rests, of course, in every case must be written in. Even though it means 'silent,' the term tacet...is not a wise substitution for a lengthy rest within a movement...The term tacet, therefore, should be used only to indicate that a player rests throughout an entire movement."

"N.C." ("no chord") is often used in guitar tablature or chord charts to indicate tacets, rests, or caesuras in the accompaniment.

== Uses of tacet ==
The earliest known usage of the term is 1724.

A unique usage of this term is in John Cage's 1952 composition 4′33″. Tacet is indicated for all three movements, for all instruments. The piece's first performance lasted a total of 4 minutes and 33 seconds, without a note being played.

== See also ==
- Latin influence in English
