= Rest (music) =

Interval of silence in a piece of music

A rest is the absence of a sound for a defined period of time in music, or one of the musical notation signs used to indicate that.

The length of a rest corresponds with that of a particular note value, thus indicating how long the silence should last. Each type of rest is named for the note value it corresponds with (e.g. quarter note and quarter rest, or quaver and quaver rest), and each of them has a distinctive sign.

== Description ==
Rests are intervals of silence in pieces of music, marked by symbols indicating the length of the silence. Each rest symbol and name corresponds with a particular note value, indicating how long the silence should last, generally as a multiplier of a measure or whole note.

American English	British English	Multiplier	Symbol
Longa	Long rest	4	A long/longa rest
Double whole rest	Breve rest	2	A double-whole/breve rest
Whole rest	Semibreve rest	1	A whole/semibreve rest
Half rest	Minim rest	1/2	A half/minim rest
Quarter rest	Crotchet rest	1/4	A quarter/crotchet rest
Eighth rest	Quaver rest	1/8	An eighth/quaver rest
Sixteenth rest	Semiquaver rest	1/16	A sixteenth/semiquaver rest
Thirty-second rest	Demisemiquaver rest	1/32	A thirty-second/demisemiquaver rest
Sixty-fourth rest	Hemidemisemiquaver rest	1/64	A sixty-fourth/hemidemisemiquaver rest

- The quarter (crotchet) rest (𝄽) may take a different form in older music.
- The four-measure rest or longa rest are only used in long silent passages which are not divided into bars.
- The combination of rests used to mark a silence follows the same rules as for note values.

=== One-bar rest ===
Rest on weak interior cadence from Lassus's Qui vult venire post me, mm. 3–5

When an entire bar is devoid of notes, a whole (semibreve) rest placed at the middle of the measure is used, regardless of the actual time signature. Historically exceptions were made for a 4/2 time signature (four half notes per bar), when a double whole (breve) rest was typically used for a bar's rest, 3/2 or 6/4 time, where a dotted whole rest was used, and for time signatures shorter than 3/16, when a rest of the actual measure length would be used. Some published (usually earlier) music places the numeral "1" above the rest to confirm the extent of the rest.

Therefore, dotted whole rests and dotted rests of longer values are very rarely seen.

Occasionally in manuscripts and facsimiles of them, bars of rest are sometimes left completely empty and unmarked, possibly even without the staves.

=== Multiple measure rests ===
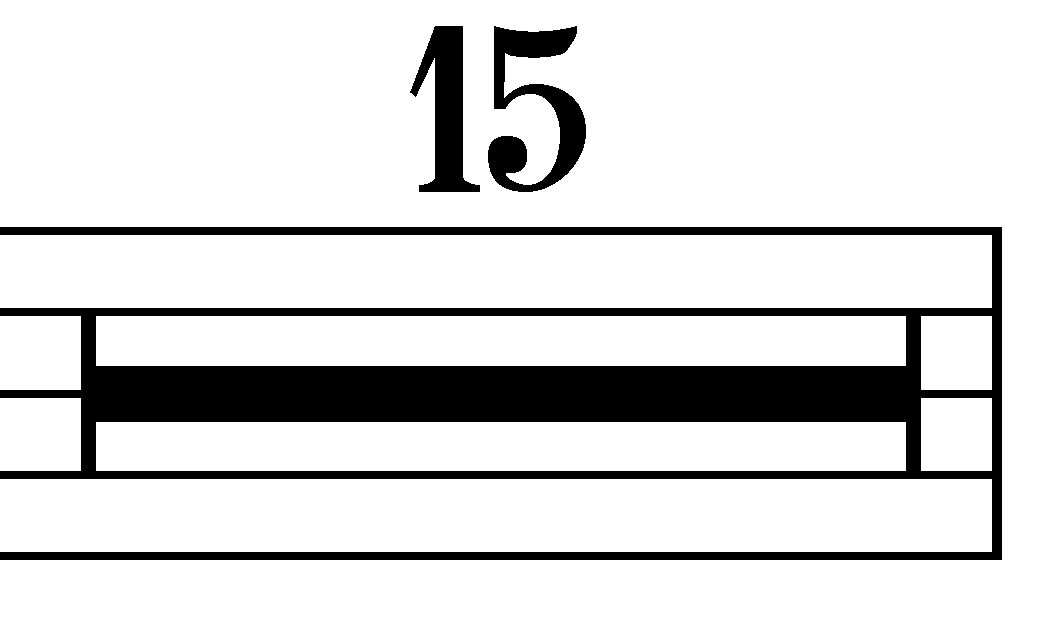
Fifteen bars' rest

The old system for notating multirests, still in use today but followed only to varying extents

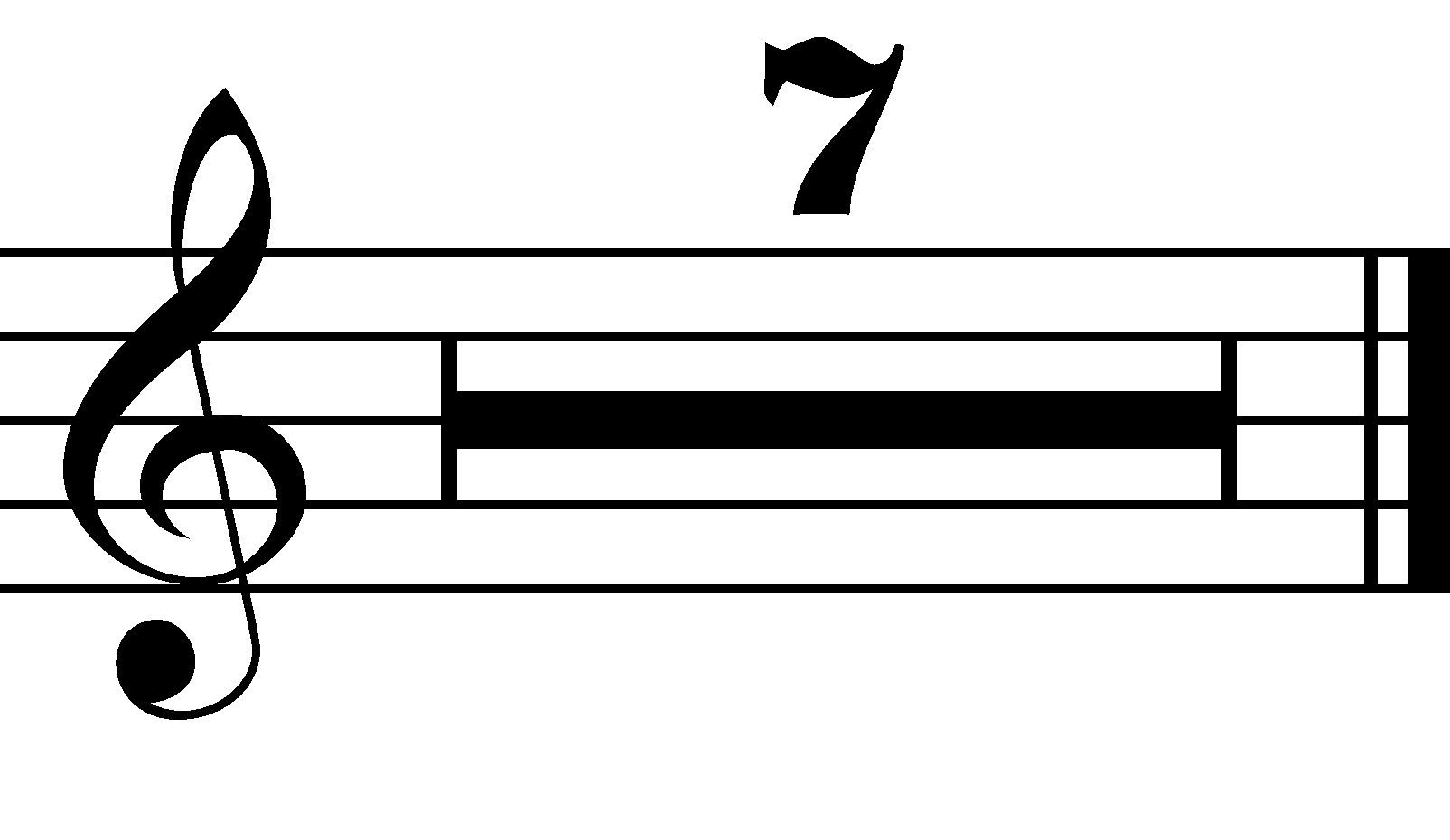
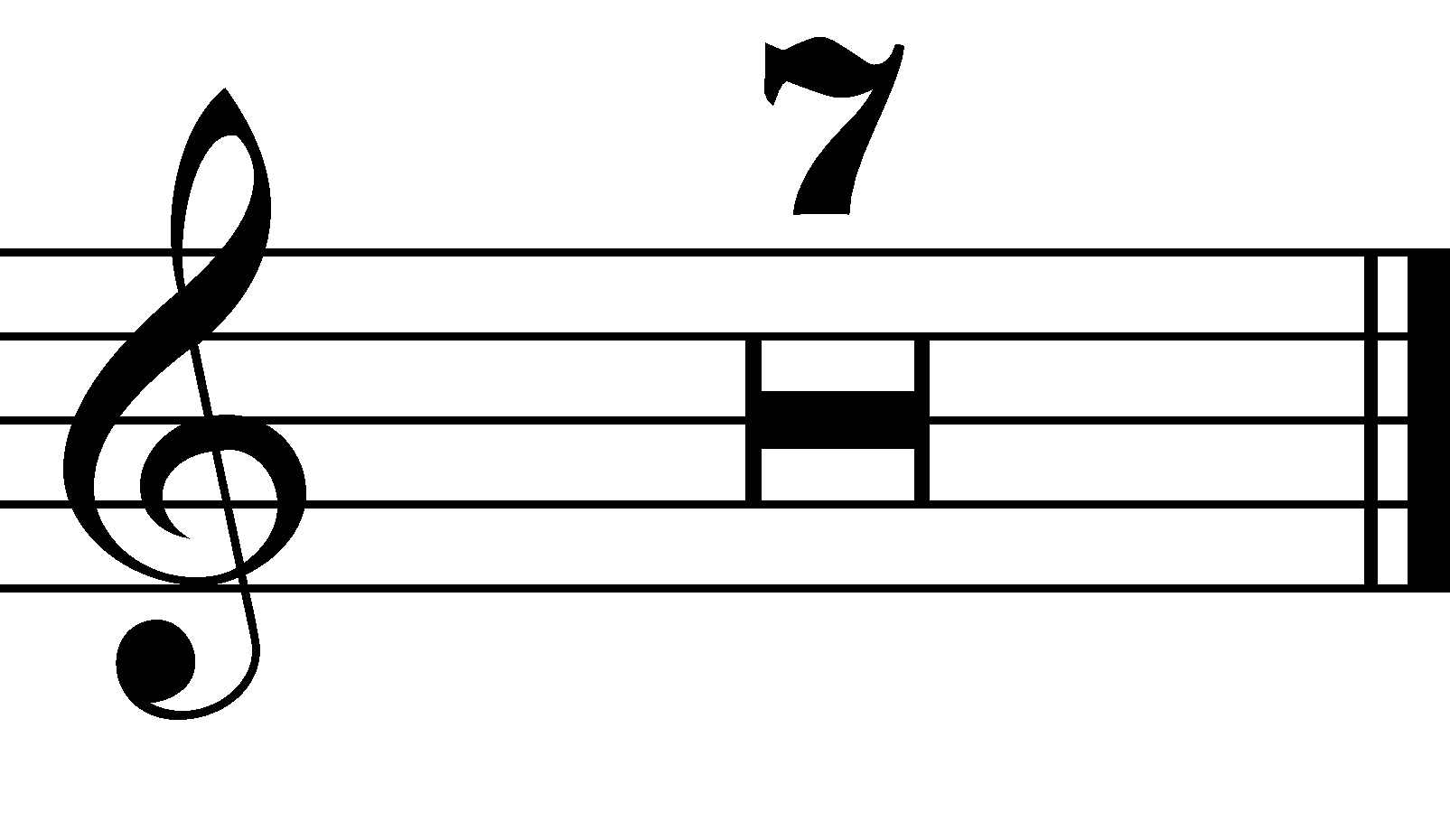
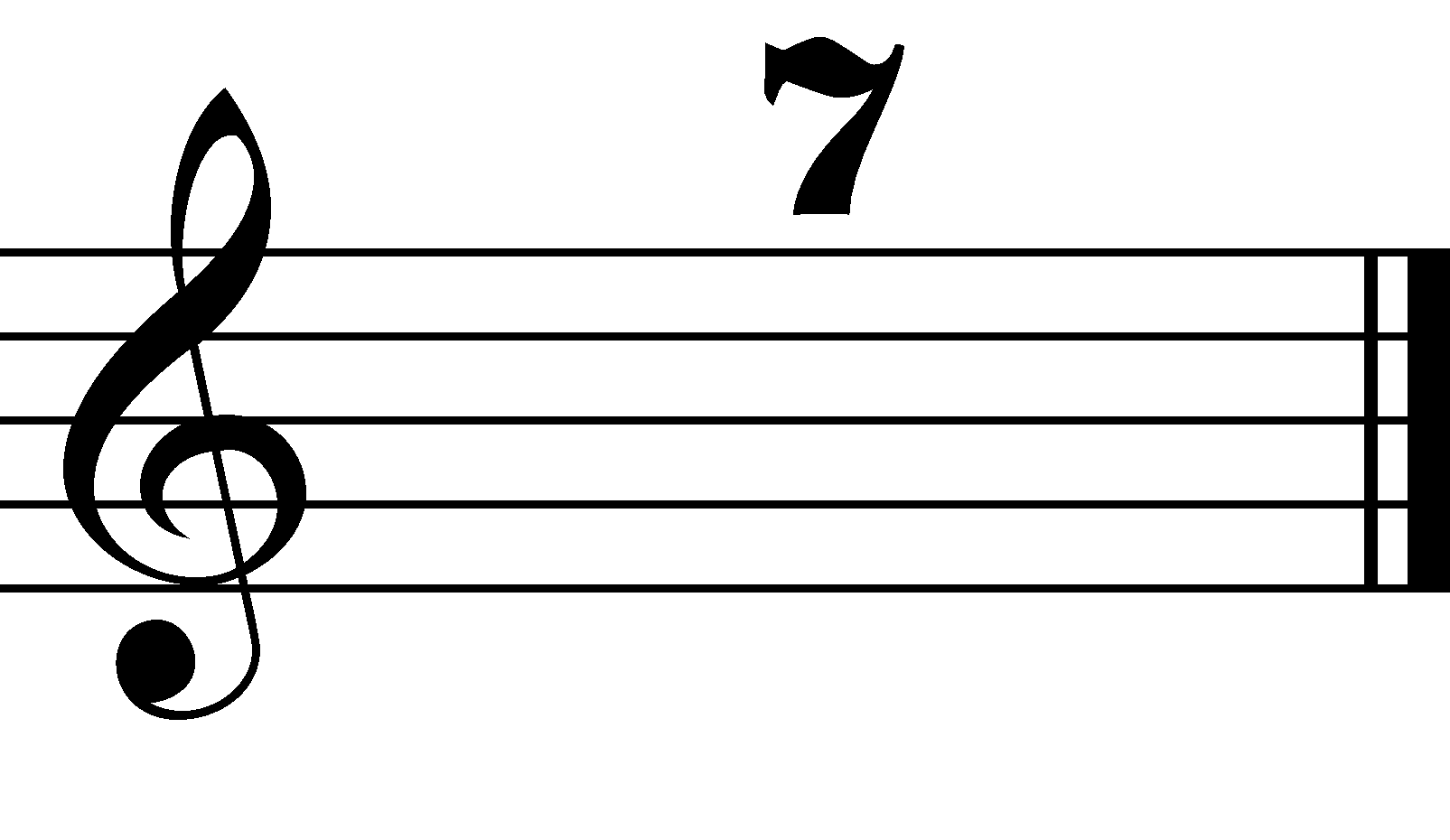
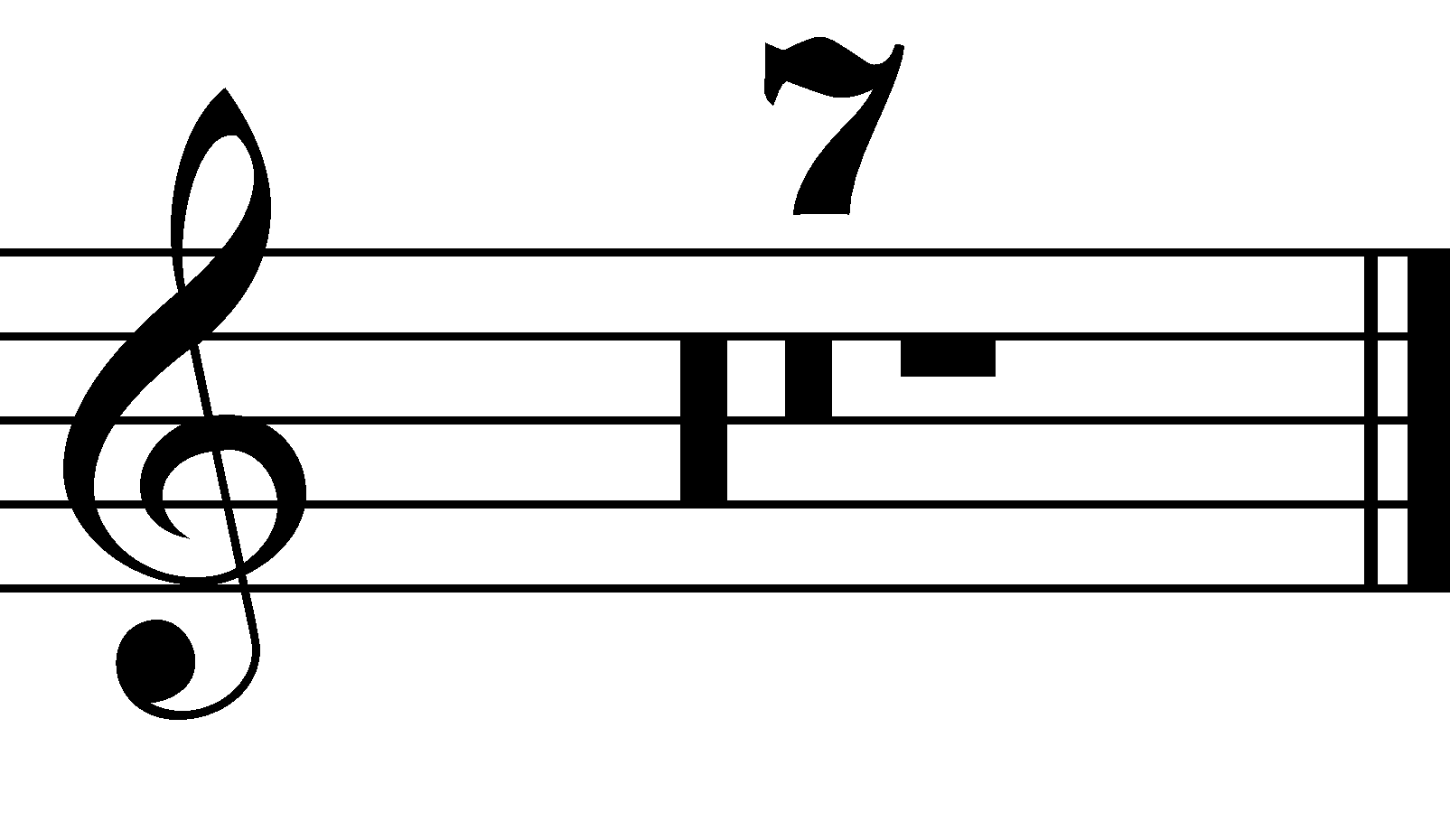
Seven measure multirest, notated variously

In instrumental parts, rests of more than one bar in the same meter and key may be indicated with a multimeasure rest (British English: multiple bar rest), showing the number of bars of rest, as shown. A multimeasure rest is usually drawn in one of two ways:

- As a thick horizontal line placed on the middle line of the staff, with serifs at both ends (see above middle picture), or as thick diagonal lines placed between the second and fourth lines of the staff, resembling a large heavy minus sign or equals sign set at a slant (the diagonal style is much less common than the horizontal one; although a small number of publishers use it, it is more commonly found in modern manuscripts in a casual style). Both variants of thick line rests are drawn in the same shape each time, regardless of how many bars' rest they represent.
- The older system of notating multirests (deriving from Baroque notation conventions that were adapted from the old mensural rest system dating from Medieval times) draws each multimeasure rest according to the picture above right unless it will exceed a certain number of bars; rests longer than that limit are drawn using the thick horizontal line mentioned above. How long a multimeasure rest must be before resorting to a horizontal line is a matter of personal taste or editorial policy; most publishers use ten bars as the changing point, however, larger and smaller changing points are used, especially in earlier music.

The number of bars for which a horizontal line multimeasure rest lasts is indicated by a number printed above the musical staff (usually at the same size as the numerals in a time signature). If a change of meter or key occurs during a multimeasure rest, that rest must be divided into shorter sections for clarity, with the changes of key and/or meter indicated between the rests. Multimeasure rests must also be divided at double barlines, which demarcate musical phrases or sections, and at rehearsal letters.

=== Dotted rest ===
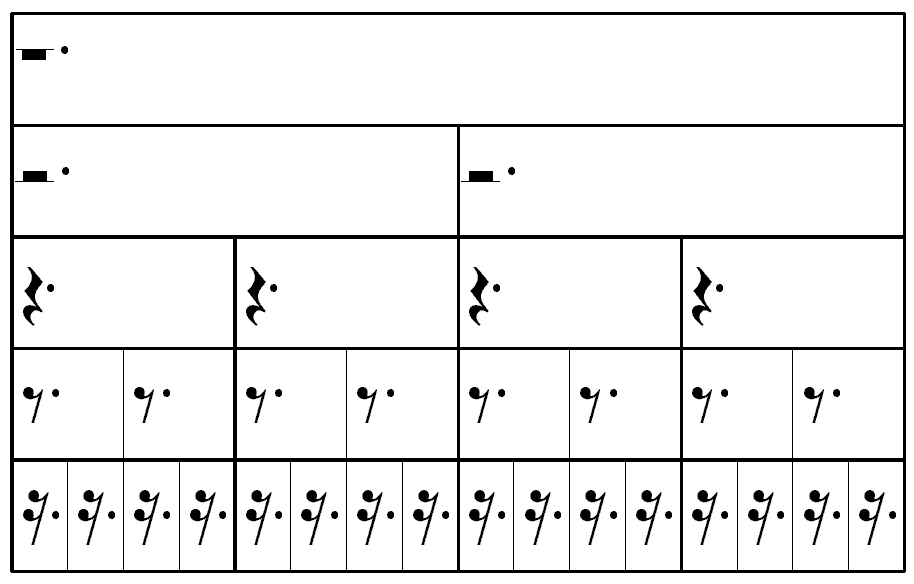

A rest may also have a dot after it, increasing its duration by half, but this is less commonly used than with notes, except occasionally in modern music notated in compound meters such as 6/8 or 12/8. In these meters the long-standing convention has been to indicate one beat of rest as a quarter rest followed by an eighth rest (equivalent to three eighths). See: Anacrusis.

=== General pause ===
In a score for an ensemble piece, "G.P." (general pause) indicates silence for one bar or more for the entire ensemble. Specifically marking general pauses each time they occur (rather than writing them as ordinary rests) is relevant for performers, as making any kind of noise should be avoided there—for instance, page turns in sheet music are not made during general pauses, as the sound of turning the page becomes noticeable when no one is playing.

== In Futurum ==
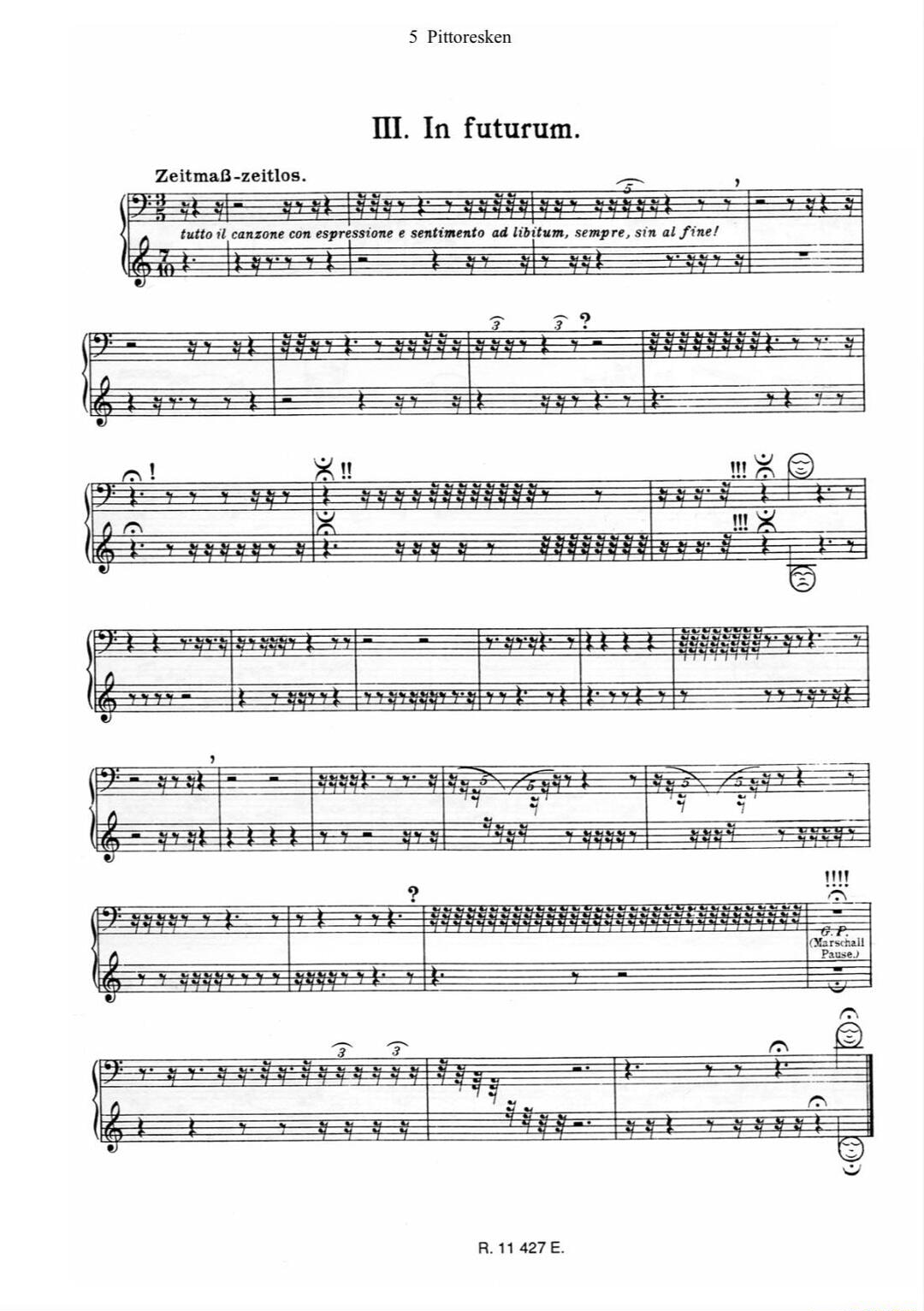
Page from the score of Erwin Schulhoff's "In Futurum" (one of his "Fünf Pittoresken") includes smiley faces

Erwin Schulhoff's "In Futurum" (the middle movement of his "Fünf Pittoresken", published in 1919) comprises nothing but annotated rests; and results in a silent performance.

== See also ==
- Caesura
- List of silent musical compositions
- List of musical symbols
- Tacet
