= Alla breve =

Time signature in Western music notation

Examples of time signatures for alla breve

Examples of time signatures for common time

Alla breve [alla ˈbrɛːve] – also known as cut time or cut common time – is a musical meter notated by the time signature symbol (a C with a vertical line through it), which is the equivalent of 2/2, though it has been used to denote 4/2. The term is Italian for "on the breve", originally meaning that the beat was counted on the breve (double whole note).

Alla breve is a "simple-duple meter with a half-note pulse". The note denomination that represents one beat is the minim or half-note. There are two of these per bar, so that the time signature 2/2 may be interpreted as "two minim beats per bar". Alternatively this is read as two beats per measure, where the half note gets the beat.

The name "common time" refers to 4/4, which has four beats to the bar, each of a quarter note (or crotchet).

== Modern usage ==
In contemporary use, alla breve suggests a fairly quick tempo. Thus, it is used frequently for military marches. From about 1600 to 1900, its meaning with regard to tempo varied, so it cannot always be taken to mean a quick tempo. Using alla breve helps the musician read notes of short duration more cleanly with fewer beats.

== Historical usage ==
The term alla breve is derived from the system of mensural or proportional notation, in use prior to 1600, in which note values (and their symbols) were related according to the ratios 2:1 or 3:1. Originally it refers to a tactus or metrical pulse (now commonly referred to as the "beat") on the whole note (semibreve) exchanged for that on the double whole note (breve), in contexts when the breve is twice as long as the semibreve (proportio dubla).

Modern notation
White notation (15th–16th centuries)
Black notation (13th–15th centuries)

Early music notation in the West was developed by members of Christian religious orders, resulting in theological associations between music, its notation, and the terminology used to describe its form. Thus music in triple time was called tempus perfectum, owing to an association with the Holy Trinity, and represented by the "perfect" circle, which has no beginning or end.

Music in duple time was conversely called tempus imperfectum, of which the symbol was the broken circle,, which is still used – although it has come to mean 4/4, or "common time", today. When cut through by a vertical line "", it means 2/2 – "cut common time," or alla breve.

The use of the vertical line or stroke in a musical graphical symbol, as practiced in the Middle Ages and the Renaissance, and now referred to by the modern term of "cut time", did not always have the same meaning as alla breve. It sometimes had other functions, including non-mensural ones.

== Example ==
The following is an example with the same rhythm notated in 2/2 and in 4/4:

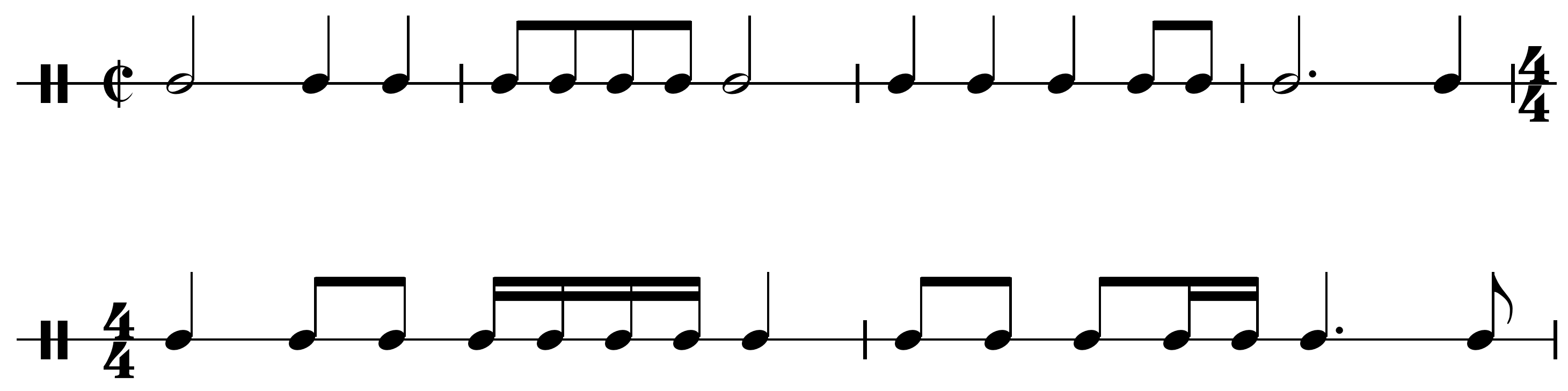
Rhythm in 2/2 followed by the same rhythm notated in 4/4. Note there are more eighth and sixteenth notes in the 4/4 version versus eighth and quarter notes in the 2/2 version, one of the reasons 2/2 is typically easier to read at faster tempos.

Audio of the example
Rhythm in 2/2 followed by the same rhythm notated in 4/4

== Sources ==
- Randel, Don Michael (2003). Harvard dictionary of music, fourth edition. Cambridge, Massachusetts: The Belknap Press of Harvard University Press. ISBN 0-674-01163-5.
- Sadie, Stanley; John Tyrrell, eds. (2001). The New Grove Dictionary of Music and Musicians, 2nd edition. New York: Grove's Dictionaries. ISBN 1-56159-239-0.
- Novello, John (1986). The Contemporary Keyboardist, Hal Leonard Corporation, ISBN 0-634-01091-3.
