= List of musical symbols =

Musical symbols are marks and symbols in musical notation that indicate various aspects of how a piece of music is to be performed. There are symbols to communicate information about many musical elements, including pitch, duration, dynamics, or articulation of musical notes; tempo, metre, form (e.g., whether sections are repeated), and details about specific playing techniques (e.g., which fingers, keys, or pedals are to be used, whether a string instrument should be bowed or plucked, or whether the bow of a string instrument should move up or down).

== Lines ==
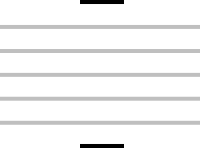
Staff/stave; The five-line staff (often "stave" in British usage) is used to indicate pitch. Each line or space indicates the pitch belonging to a note with a letter name: A, B, C, D, E, F, G. Moving vertically upwards, the letter names proceed alphabetically with the alternating lines and spaces, and represent ascending pitches. The A-G pattern repeats continually—the note above "G" is always another "A". A clef is almost always added, which assigns one specific pitch to one specific line; the other lines and spaces are determined alphabetically as described.
Ledger or leger lines These additional lines (and the spaces they form) indicate pitches above or below the staff. The diagram shows one ledger line above the staff and one below, but multiple ledger lines can be used.
Bar line (or barline); Bar lines separate measures ("bars") of music according to the indicated time signature. They sometimes extend through multiple staves to group them together when a grand staff is used or when indicating groups of similar instruments in a conductor's score.
Double bar line These indicate some change in the music, such as a new musical section, or a new key/time signature.
Bold double bar line These indicate the conclusion of a movement or composition.
Dotted bar line These can be used to subdivide measures of complex meter into shorter segments for ease of reading.
Brace; A brace is used to connect two or more lines of music that are played simultaneously, usually by a single player, generally when using a grand staff. The grand staff is used for piano, harp, organ, and some pitched percussion instruments. The brace is occasionally called an accolade in some old texts and can vary in design and style.
Bracket; A bracket is used to connect two or more lines of music that sound simultaneously. In contemporary usage it usually connects staves of individual instruments (e.g., flute and clarinet; two trumpets; etc.) or multiple vocal parts, whereas the brace connects multiple parts for a single instrument (e.g., the right-hand and left-hand staves of a piano or harp part).

== Clefs ==
A clef assigns one particular pitch to one particular line of the staff on which it is placed. This effectively defines the pitch range or tessitura of the music on that staff. A clef is usually the leftmost symbol on a staff, although a different clef may appear elsewhere to indicate a change in register. Historically, clefs could be placed on any line on a staff (or even on a space), but modern notation almost exclusively uses treble, bass, alto, and tenor clef.

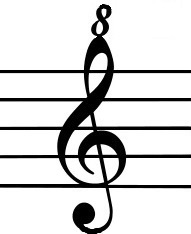
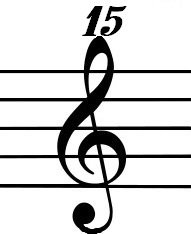
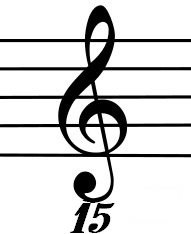
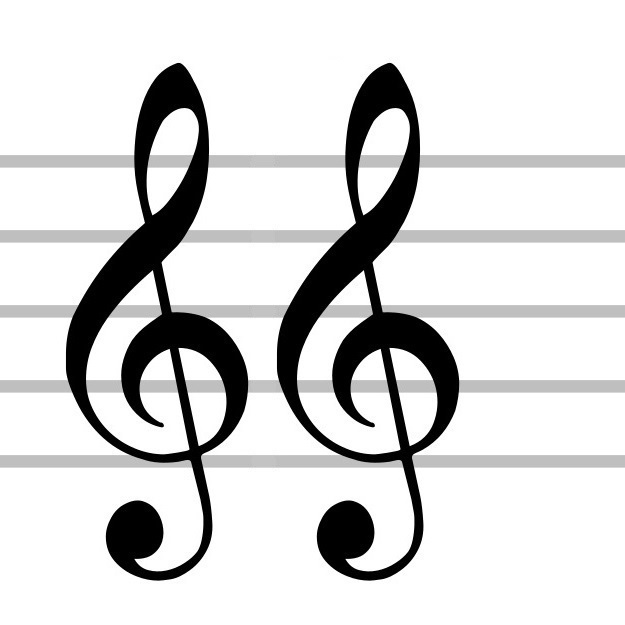
G clef (Treble clef); The center of the spiral of a G clef shows where the G above middle C is located on the staff. A G clef with the spiral centered on the second line of the staff is called treble clef. The treble clef is the most commonly encountered clef in modern notation.
Alto clef	C clef (Alto and Tenor clefs); The center of a C clef points to the line representing middle C. The center of alto clef places middle C on the third line on the staff. It is mainly used for the viola but is sometimes used for other instruments. Tenor clef places middle C on the fourth line. It is used for bassoon, cello, trombone, and double bass when the notes get very high, avoiding the use of excessive ledger lines. Until the classical era, C clefs were frequently placed on other lines as well (it is sometimes called a "movable clef"), mostly in vocal music, but this has been supplanted by the universal use of the treble and bass clefs. Modern editions of music from such periods generally rewrite the original C-clef parts to either treble (female voices), octave treble (tenors), or bass clef (tenors and basses). The C clef was sometimes placed on the third space of the staff (equivalent to an octave treble clef) but this usage is unusual since all other modern clefs are placed on lines.
Tenor clef
F clef (Bass clef); An F clef places the F below middle C on the line between the dots. When placing the F below middle C on the fourth line, as shown here, it is called bass clef, which is by far its most common usage. Bass clef appears nearly as often as treble clef in modern music notation. In older notation, particularly for vocal music, F clefs were sometimes centered on the third line (baritone clef) but this usage is obsolete.
Octave clef Treble and bass clefs can be modified by octave numbers. An "8" below the clef (as in the third diagram) indicates that pitches will sound an octave lower than they would with the unmodified clef. A "15" below indicates a two-octave shift. These numbers may also be used above the clef to indicate pitches one or two octaves higher. A treble clef with an eight below is the most common version, typically used in music for guitar or tenor voice. Sometimes a shift of one octave down is indicated by drawing two clefs instead of one.
On a 5-line staff	Neutral clef Used for pitchless instruments, such as percussion instruments. It is not a true clef—the lines and spaces do not indicate pitches—but it occupies the position of a clef. In this case, the lines and spaces indicate specific instruments, such as the different individual instruments in a drum set. It may also be drawn on a single-line staff for single percussion instruments.
On a single-line staff
Tablature; Used in place of ordinary staff notation for some string instruments, such as the guitar. It is not a clef, as the lines and spaces do not represent pitches. The lines represent the strings of an instrument (for standard 6-string guitars, six lines would be used). Numbers on the lines show which fret to use. Because the lines represent strings, the spaces between the lines are not used.

== Rhythmic values of notes and rests ==
In American usage, musical note and rest values have names that indicate their length relative to a whole note. A half note is half the length of a whole note, a quarter note is one quarter the length, etc.

Note	British name / American name	Rest
	Large (Latin: Maxima) / Octuple whole note
	Longa / Quadruple whole note
	Breve / Double whole note
	Semibreve / Whole note
	Minim / Half note
	Crotchet / Quarter note
	Quaver / Eighth note For notes of this length and shorter, the note has the same number of flags (or hooks) as the rest has branches.
	Semiquaver / Sixteenth note
	Demisemiquaver / Thirty-second note
	Hemidemisemiquaver / Sixty-fourth note
	Semihemidemisemiquaver / Quasihemidemisemiquaver / Hundred twenty-eighth note
	Demisemihemidemisemiquaver / Two hundred fifty-sixth note

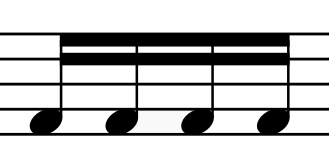
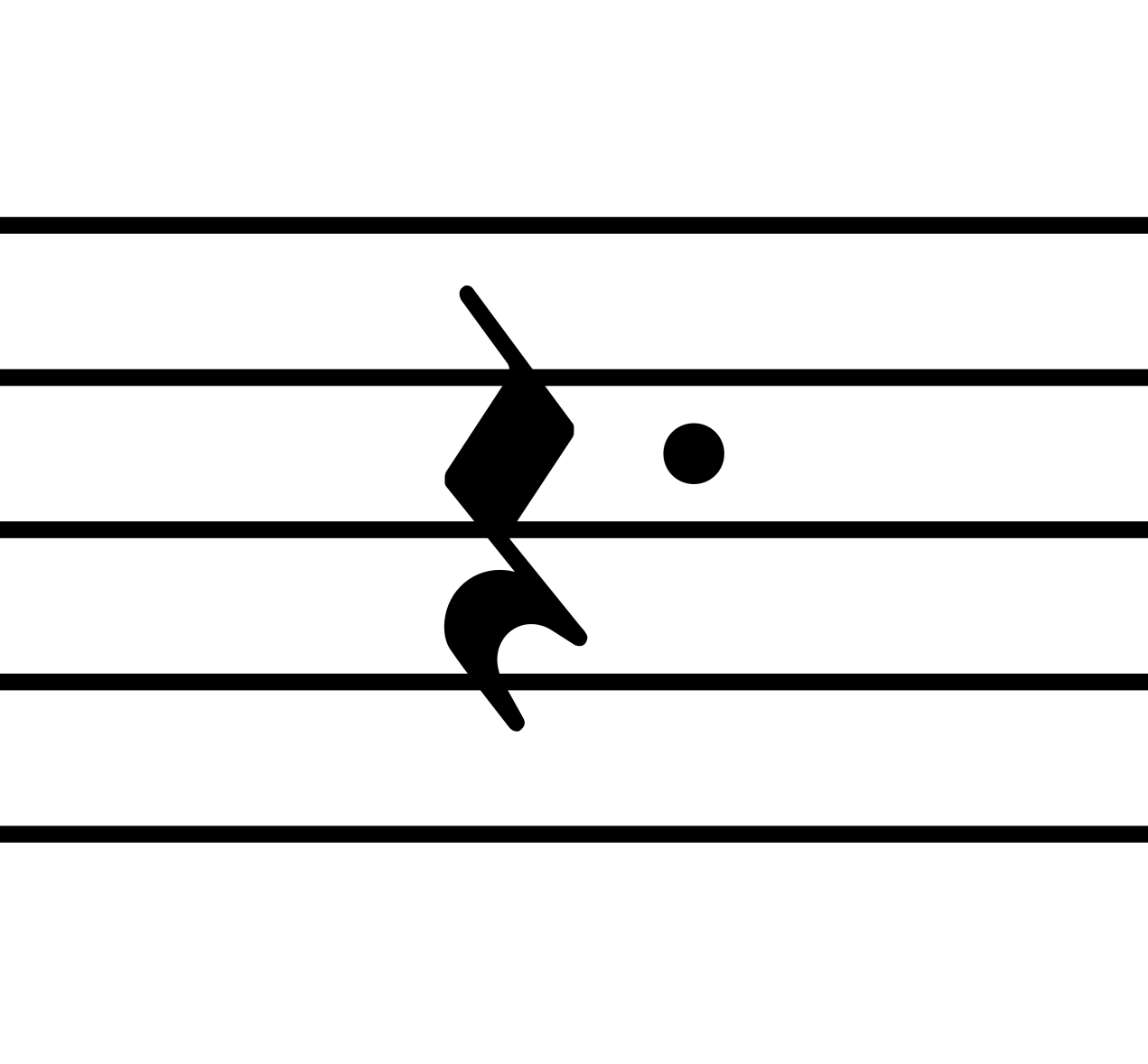
Beamed notes Eighth notes (quavers) and shorter notes have flags to indicate their duration, but can also be grouped together with beams. The number of beams is equivalent to the number of flags on the note value—eighth notes are beamed together with a single beam, sixteenth notes with two, and so on. This is usually done to indicate a rhythmic grouping but can also be used to connect notes in ametrical passages. In older printings of vocal music, the use of beams is sometimes reserved for notes that are sung on one syllable of text (melisma). Modern notation of vocal music encourages the use of beaming, consistent with instrumental engraving, however. In non-traditional meters, beaming is at the discretion of composers and arrangers and can be used to emphasize a rhythmic pattern.
Dotted note Placing a dot to the right of a notehead lengthens the note's duration by one-half. A second dot increases the duration by an additional 1/4, making the note 1 3/4 times as long as the unmodified note. Additional dots would continue this system, each increasing the duration by 1/2 of the previous dot's value, but use of more than two dots is rare. Rests can be dotted in the same manner as notes.
Ghost note A ghost note has a rhythmic value but no discernible pitch. It is represented by a (saltire) cross (similar to the letter x) notehead instead of an oval. It is primarily used to represent percussive pitches or spoken words.
Multi-measure rest The multi-measure rest is a compact way to indicate multiple measures of rest. It is also called gathered rest or multi-bar rest.

== Breaks ==
Breath mark This symbol tells the performer to take a breath (for singers and aerophones), to lift the bow and start the next note with a new bowing (for bowed instruments), or to leave a slight space (for other instruments). This marking does not affect the tempo.
Caesura; A caesura indicates a pause during which time is not counted.

== Accidentals and key signatures ==
=== Common accidentals ===
Accidentals modify the pitch of the notes that follow them on the same staff position within a measure, unless cancelled by an additional accidental.

Flat; The flat symbol lowers the pitch of a note by one semitone.
Sharp; The sharp symbol raises the pitch of a note by one semitone.
Natural; A natural cancels a sharp or flat. This sharp or flat may have been indicated as an accidental or defined by the key signature.
Double flat A double flat lowers the pitch of a note by two semitones.
Double sharp A double sharp raises the pitch of a note by two semitones.

=== Key signatures ===
Key signatures indicate which notes are to be played as sharps or flats in the music that follows, showing up to seven sharps or flats. Notes that are shown as sharp or flat in a key signature will be played that way in every octave—e.g., a key signature with a B♭ indicates that every B is played as a B♭. A key signature indicates the prevailing key of the music and eliminates the need to use accidentals for the notes that are always flat or sharp in that key. A key signature with no flats or sharps generally indicates the key of C major or A minor, but can also indicate that pitches will be notated with accidentals as required. The key signature examples shown here are as they would appear in treble clef.

Flat key signatures

Sharp key signatures

=== Microtones ===
There is no universally accepted notation for microtonal music, with varying systems being used depending on the situation. A common notation for quarter tones involves writing the fraction 1/4 next to an arrow pointing up or down. Below are other forms of notation:

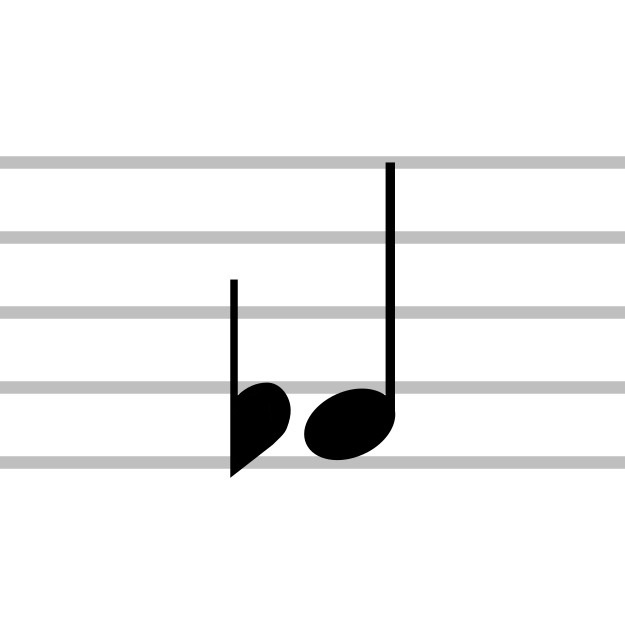
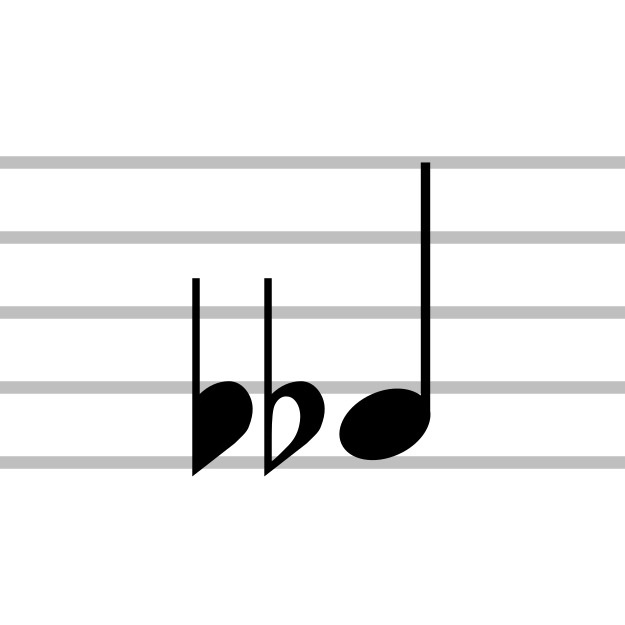
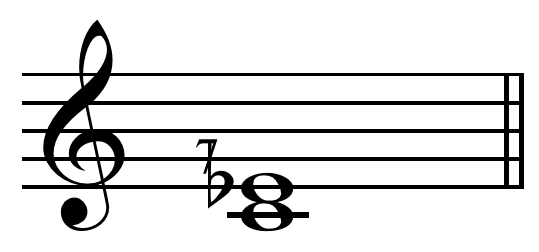
Demiflat / Half flat Lowers the pitch of a note by one quarter tone. (Another notation for the demiflat is a flat with a diagonal slash through its stem. In systems where pitches are divided into intervals smaller than a quarter tone, the slashed flat represents a lower note than the reversed flat.)
Flat-and-a-half (sesquiflat); Lowers the pitch of a note by three quarter tones. As with a demiflat, a slashed double-flat symbol is also used.
Demisharp / Half sharp Raises the pitch of a note by one quarter tone.
Sharp-and-a-half (sesquisharp); Raises the pitch of a note by three quarter tones. Occasionally represented with two vertical and three diagonal bars instead.
Harmonic flat Lowers the pitch of a note to a pitch matching the indicated number in the harmonic series of the root (bottom) of the chord. The diagram shows a specific example, the septimal flat, in the context of a septimal minor third, in which the E♭ is tuned exactly to a 7:6 frequency ratio with the root (C).

A symbol with one vertical and three diagonal bars indicates a sharp with some form of alternate tuning.

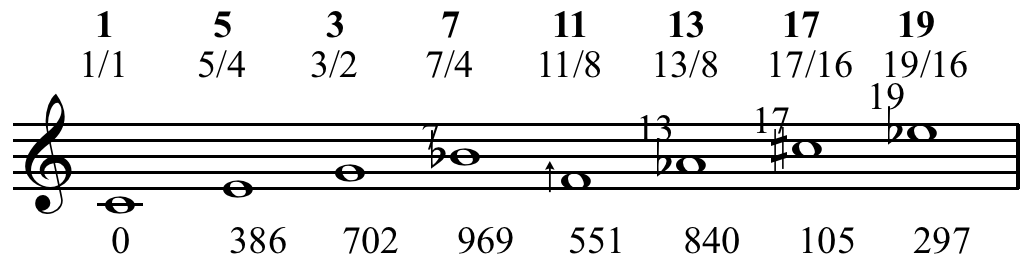
Notation for the prime numbers in the harmonic series, labeled with their number (top line), frequency ratios (second line) and interval size in cents (bottom). The 11th harmonic is notated with the arrow notation for a demisharp (F↑ as opposed to F) while the 7th, 13th, 17th and 19th are labeled with harmonic flats and harmonic sharps relative to C (because the 17th and 19th harmonics are closer to equal temperament than the (unlabeled) 5th, labeling of those is seldom necessary).

In 19 equal temperament, where a whole tone is divided into three steps instead of two, music is typically notated in a way that flats and sharps are not usually enharmonic (thus a C♯ represents a third of a step lower than D♭); this has the advantage of not requiring any nonstandard notation.

== Time signatures ==
Most music has a rhythmic pulse with a uniform number of beats—each segment of this pulse is shown as a measure. Time signatures indicate the number of beats in each measure (the top number) and also show what type of note represents a single beat (the bottom number). There may be any number of beats in a measure but the most common by far are multiples of 2 or 3 (i.e., a top number of 2, 3, 4, or 6). Likewise, any note length can be used to represent a beat, but a quarter note (indicated by a bottom number of 4) or eighth note (bottom number of 8) are by far the most common.

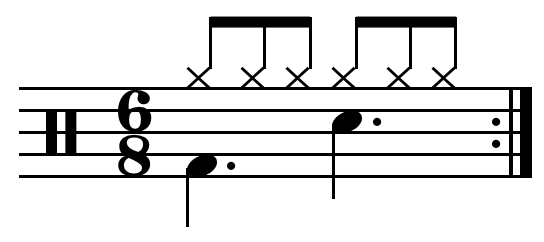
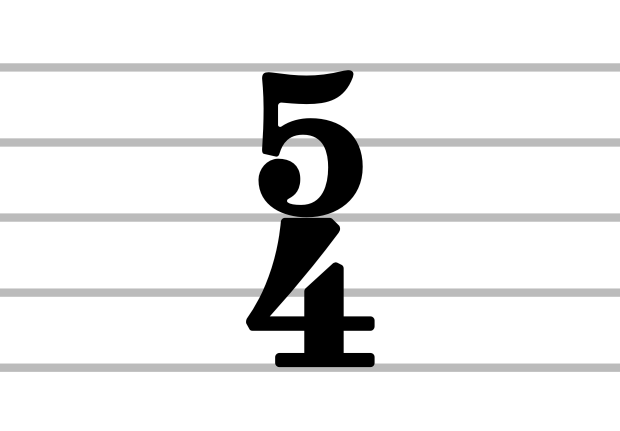
Simple time signatures Simple time signatures are usually classified as those with an upper number of 2, 3, or 4. This example shows that each measure is the length of three quarter notes (crotchets). 3/4 is pronounced as "three-four" or "three-quarter time".
Compound time signatures In a compound meter, there is an additional rhythmic grouping within each measure. This example shows 6/8 time, indicating 6 beats per measure, with an eighth note representing one beat. The rhythm within each measure is divided into two groups of three eighth notes each (notated by beaming in groups of three). This indicates a pulse that follows the eighth notes (as expected) along with a pulse that follows a dotted quarter note (equivalent to three eighth notes).
Complex/irregular time signatures Time signatures that cannot be classified as simple or compound, such as 5/4 or 11/8, are often called complex, irregular or odd. These time signatures cannot be evenly subdivided into groups of two or three.
Common time This symbol represents 4/4 time—four beats per measure with a quarter note representing one beat. It derives from the broken circle that represented "imperfect" duple meter in fourteenth-century mensural time signatures.
Alla breve / cut time This symbol represents 2/2 time—two beats per measure with a half-note representing one beat.
Metronome mark This notation is used to precisely define the tempo of the music by assigning an absolute duration to each beat. This example indicates a tempo of 120 quarter notes (crotchets) per minute. Many publishers precede the marking with letters "M.M.", referring to Maelzel's Metronome. This is a tempo marking, not a time signature—it is independent of how the beats are grouped (the top number in a time signature), although it defines the tempo in terms of the counting note (the bottom number).

== Note relationships ==
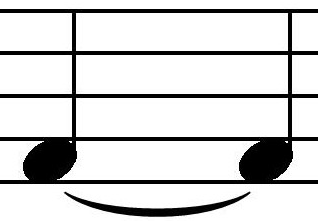
Tie; A tie indicates that two notes with the same pitch are to be played as a single note. The length of this single note is the sum of the lengths of the two tied notes. The symbol for the tie and the symbol for the slur can appear the same, but they have different meanings.
Slur; While the first note of a slurred group is articulated, the others are not. For bowed instruments this entails playing the notes in a single bow movement, for wind instruments (aerophones) the first note is tongued but the rest are not. On other instruments, like pitched percussion instruments, the notes are connected in a phrase, as if a singer were to sing them in a single breath. In certain contexts a slur may instead indicate that the notes are to be played legato, in which case rearticulation is permitted. The tie symbol can appear the same as a slur but it connects two notes of the same pitch, combining them into a single (longer) note. In vocal music a slur normally indicates that notes under the slur should be sung to a single syllable. A phrase mark (or less commonly, ligature) is visually identical to a slur but connects a passage of music over several measures. A phrase mark indicates a musical phrase and may not necessarily require that the music be slurred.
Glissando / Portamento; A continuous, uninterrupted glide from one note to the next that includes the pitches between. Some instruments, such as the violin or the trombone, can make this glide continuously (portamento), while other instruments, such as the harp, blur the discrete pitches between the start and end notes to mimic a continuous slide (glissando).
Tuplet; A tuplet is a group of notes that would not normally fit into the rhythmic space they occupy. The example shown is a quarter-note triplet—three quarter notes are to be played in the space that would normally contain two. (To determine how many "normal" notes are being replaced by the tuplet, it is sometimes necessary to examine the context.) While triplets are the most common version, many other tuplets are possible: five notes in the space of four, seven notes in the space of eight, etc. Specific tuplets are named according to the number of grouped notes; e.g., quintuplets.
Chord; A chord is several notes sounded simultaneously. Two-note chords are called dyads, three-note chords built by using the interval of a third are called triads.
Arpeggiated chord A chord with notes played in rapid succession, usually ascending, each note being sustained as the others are played. It is also called a broken chord, a rolled chord, or an arpeggio.

== Dynamics ==
Dynamics are indicators of the relative intensity or volume of a musical line.

Pianississimo; Extremely soft. Softer dynamics occur very infrequently and would be specified with additional ps.
Pianissimo; Very soft.
Piano; Soft.
Mezzo piano Moderately soft; louder than piano.
Mezzo forte Moderately loud; softer than forte. If no dynamic appears, mezzo-forte is assumed to be the default dynamic level.
Forte; Loud.
Fortissimo; Very loud.
Fortississimo; Extremely loud. Louder dynamics occur very infrequently and would be specified with additional fs.
Sforzando / Sforzato (subito forzando/forzato); Literally "suddenly forced", denotes an abrupt, fierce accent on a single sound or chord. When written out in full, it applies to the sequence of sounds or chords under or over which it is placed. The weaker version is "forzando" or "forzato". Sforzando is not to be confused with rinforzando. Also written sf or fz.
Fortepiano; Indicates that the note is to be played with a loud attack, and then immediately become soft.
Crescendo; A gradual increase in volume. Can be extended under many notes to indicate that the volume steadily increases during the passage.
Diminuendo / Decrescendo; A gradual decrease in volume. Can be extended under many notes to indicate that the volume steadily decreases during the passage.
Niente; Meaning "nothing". May be used at the start of a crescendo to indicate "start from nothing" or at the end of a diminuendo to indicate "fade out to nothing". While there is no symbol for niente on the Musical Symbols Unicode block, it can be rendered as ○, ø, or n.

Rarely, even softer or louder dynamic levels are indicated by adding more ps or fs. While ppp is called "pianississimo" and fff is called "fortississimo", these words (formed by adding an additional "iss") are not proper Italian.

Dynamics are relative, and the meaning of each level is at the discretion of the performer or the conductor. Laws to curb high noise levels in the workplace have changed the interpretation of very loud dynamics in some large orchestral works, as noise levels within the orchestra itself can easily exceed safe levels.

== Articulation ==
Articulations specify the length, volume, and style of attack of individual notes. This category includes accents. Articulations can be combined with one another and may appear in conjunction with phrasing marks (above). Any of these markings may be placed either above or below a note.

Staccato; This indicates that the note should be played shorter than notated, usually half the value, leaving the rest of the metric value silent. Staccato marks may appear on notes of any value, shortening their performed duration without speeding up the music.
Staccatissimo or Spiccato; This indicates that the note should be played even shorter than staccato. It is usually applied to quarter notes or shorter notes. In the past this marking's meaning was more ambiguous—it was sometimes used interchangeably with staccato and sometimes indicated an accent and not a shortened note. These usages are now almost defunct but still appear in some scores. For string instruments this indicates a bowing technique in which the bow bounces lightly upon the string.
Tenuto; This symbol indicates that the note should be played at its full value, or slightly longer. It can also indicate a degree of emphasis, especially when combined with dynamic markings to indicate a change in loudness, or combined with a staccato dot to indicate a slight detachment (portato or mezzo staccato). In percussion notation, this sign indicates a slight accent.
Fermata or Pause; A fermata indicates that a note, chord, or rest is sustained longer than its written value. It will usually appear on all parts in an ensemble. The fermata is held for as long as the performer or conductor desires.
Accent; An accent indicates that a note should be played louder, or with a harder attack than surrounding unaccented notes. It may appear on notes of any duration.
Marcato; A marcato marking indicates that the note should be played louder or more forcefully than a note with a regular accent mark. In organ notation, this sign often does not indicate marcato, but instead that a pedal note should be played with the toe. When placed above the note it indicates the right foot's toe, and below the note it indicates the left foot's toe.

== Ornaments ==
Ornaments modify the pitch pattern of individual notes.

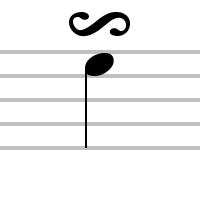
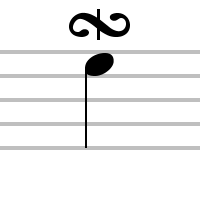
Tremolo; A rapidly repeated note. If the tremolo is between two notes, then they are played in rapid alternation. The number of slashes through the stem (or number of diagonal bars between two notes) indicates the frequency to repeat (or alternate) the note. As shown here, the note is to be repeated at a demisemiquaver (thirty-second note) rate, but it is a common convention for three slashes to be interpreted as "as fast as possible", or at any rate at a speed to be left to the player's judgment. In percussion notation, tremolos indicate rolls, diddles, and drags. Typically, a single tremolo line on a sufficiently short note (such as a sixteenth) is played as a drag, and a combination of three stem and tremolo lines indicates a double-stroke roll (or a single-stroke roll, in the case of timpani, mallet percussion and some untuned percussion instruments such as triangle and bass drum) for a period equivalent to the duration of the note. In other cases, the interpretation of tremolos is highly variable, and should be examined by the director and performers. The tremolo symbol also represents flutter-tonguing.
Trill; A rapid alternation between the specified note and the next higher note (determined by key signature) within its duration, also called a "shake". When followed by a wavy horizontal line, this symbol indicates an extended, or running, trill. In music up to the time of Haydn or Mozart the trill begins on the upper auxiliary note. In percussion notation, a trill is sometimes used to indicate a tremolo. In French baroque notation, the trill, or tremblement, was notated as a small cross above or beside the note.
Upper mordent Rapidly play the principal note, the next higher note (according to key signature) then return to the principal note for the remaining duration. In some music, the mordent begins on the auxiliary note, and the alternation between the two notes may be extended. (In other words, in some music, the upper-mordent sign means exactly the same as the trill sign.) Regardless of the style of music, the pattern finishes on the principal note. In handbells, this symbol is a "shake" and indicates the rapid shaking of the bells for the duration of the note.
Lower mordent (inverted); Rapidly play the principal note, the note below it, then return to the principal note for the remaining duration. In much music, the mordent begins on the auxiliary note, and the alternation between the two notes may be extended.
Gruppetto or Turn; When placed directly above the note, the turn (also known as a gruppetto) indicates a sequence of upper auxiliary note, principal note, lower auxiliary note, and a return to the principal note. When placed to the right of the note, the principal note is played first, followed by the above pattern. Placing a vertical line through the turn symbol or inverting it, it indicates an inverted turn, in which the order of the auxiliary notes is reversed.
Appoggiatura; The first half of the principal note's duration has the pitch of the grace note (the first two-thirds if the principal note is a dotted note).
Acciaccatura; The acciaccatura is of very brief duration, as though brushed on the way to the principal note, which receives virtually all of its notated duration. In some styles of music, the acciaccatura is played exactly on the beat and the principal note is marginally late; in other styles, the acciaccatura is marginally early and the principal note is on the beat. It is also possible on some instruments to play both notes exactly on the beat and then quickly release the acciaccatura. In percussion notation, the acciaccatura symbol denotes the flam, the miniature note still positioned behind the main note but on the same line or space of the staff. The flam note is usually played just before the natural durational subdivision the main note is played on, with the timing and duration of the main note remaining unchanged. Also known by the English translation of the Italian term, crushed note, and in German as Zusammenschlag (simultaneous stroke).

== Octave signs ==
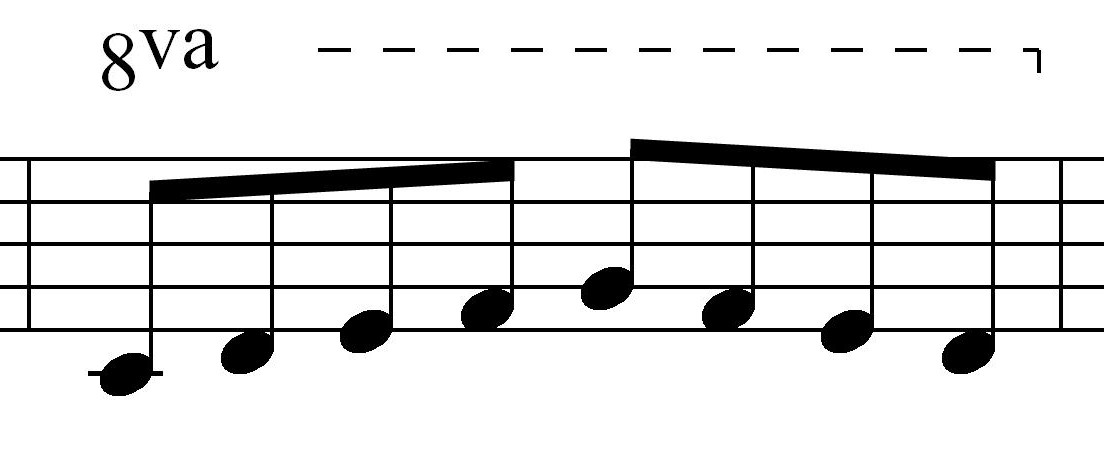
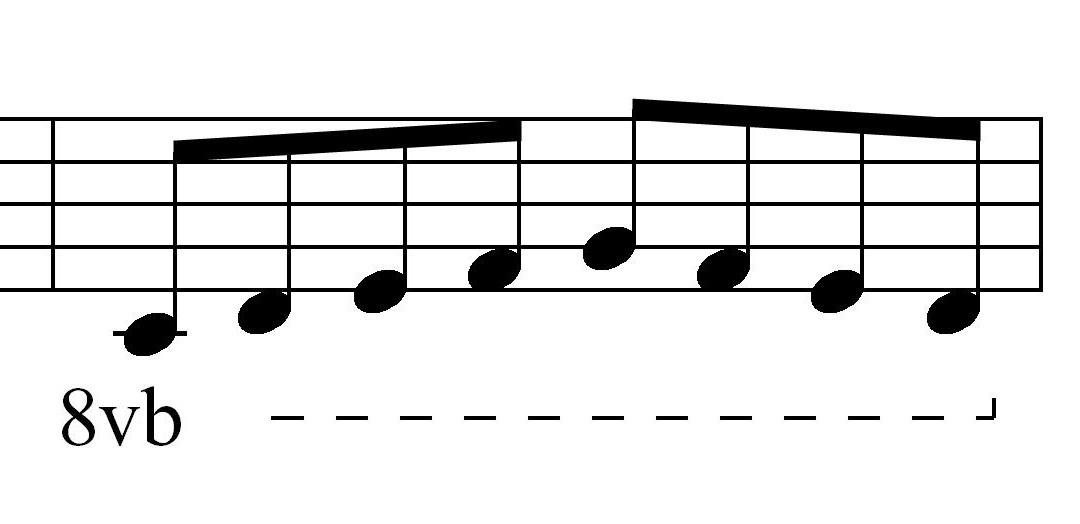
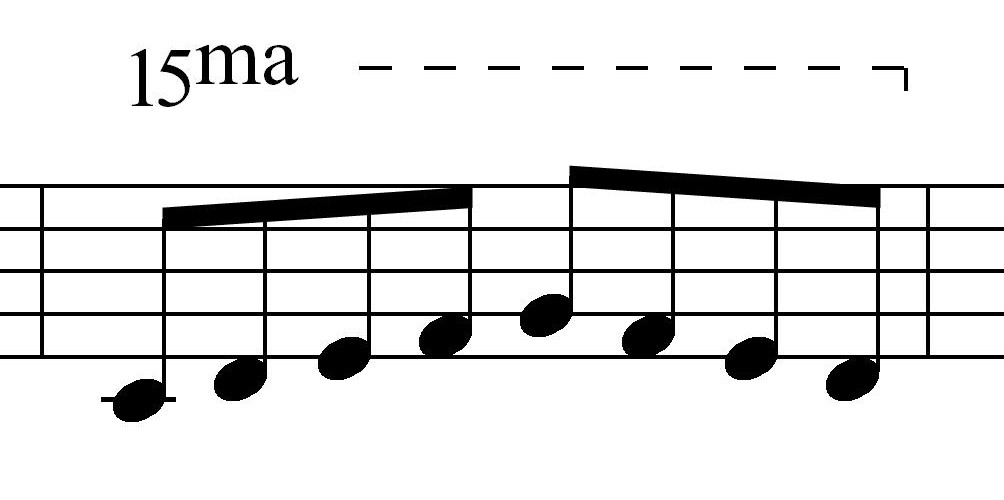
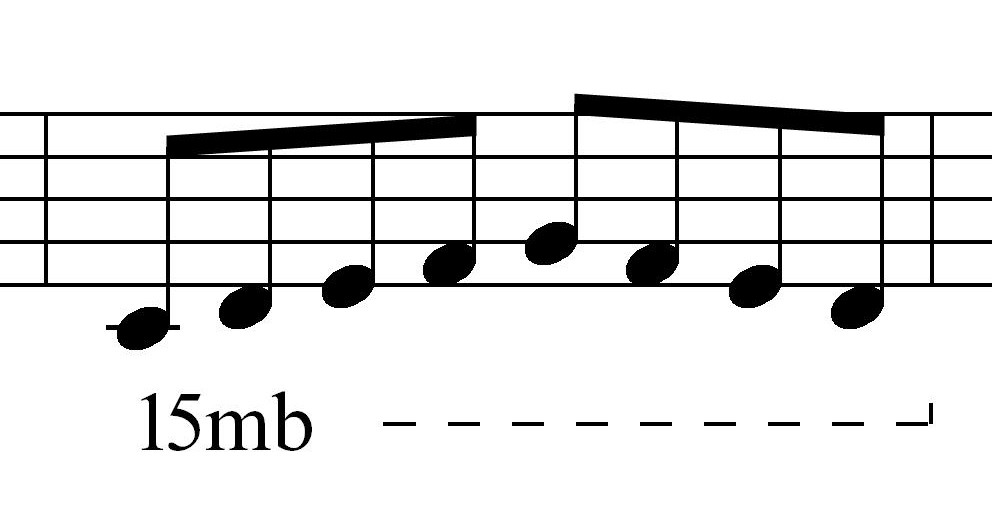
Ottava alta 8^{va} is placed above the staff to indicate that the passage is to be played one octave higher.
Ottava bassa 8^{vb} is placed below the staff to indicate that the passage is to be played one octave lower.
Quindicesima alta 15^{ma} is placed above the staff to indicate that the passage is to be played two octaves higher.
Quindicesima bassa 15^{mb} is placed below the staff to indicate that the passage is to be played two octaves lower.

8^{va} and 15^{ma} are sometimes abbreviated further to 8 and 15. When they appear below the staff, the word bassa is sometimes added.

== Repetition, codas, and other direction symbols ==
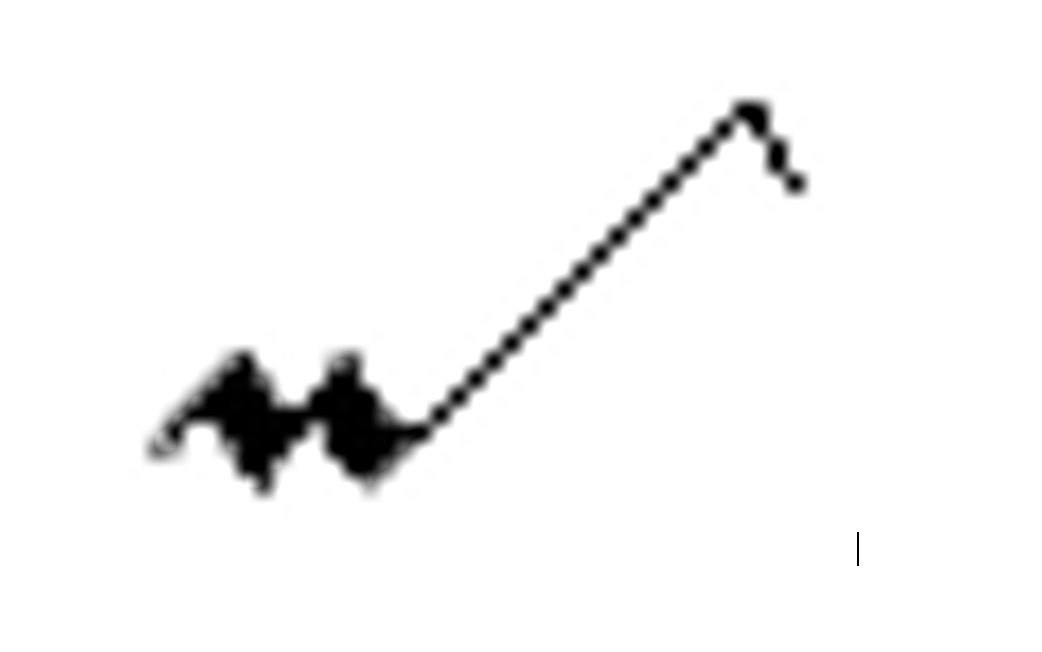
Repeat signs Enclose a passage that is to be played more than once. If there is no left repeat sign, the right repeat sign sends the performer back to the start of the piece or the movement.
Simile marks Denote that preceding groups of beats or measures are to be repeated. In the examples here, the first usually means to repeat the previous measure, and the second usually means to repeat the previous two measures. This mark is normally only used in styles of music in which the players commonly expect to play repeated patterns, and in which the mark is therefore frequently encountered; in styles where such a mark would be unusual, repeated measures are written out in full, or the "repeat sign" is used instead.
Volta brackets (1st and 2nd endings, or 1st- and 2nd-time bars); A repeated passage is to be played with different endings on different playings. Although two endings are most common, it is possible to have multiple endings (1st, 2nd, 3rd ...).
Da capo (lit. "From top") Tells the performer to repeat playing of the music from its beginning. This is usually followed by al fine (lit. "to the end"), which means to repeat to the word fine and stop, or al coda (lit. "to the tail"), which means repeat up to the coda sign and then jump forward into the coda.
Dal segno (lit. "From the sign") Tells the performer to repeat playing of the music starting at the nearest preceding segno. This is followed by al fine or al coda just as with da capo.
Segno; Mark used with dal segno.
Coda sign Indicates a forward jump in the music to its coda (ending passage), which is marked with the same sign. Only used after playing through a D.S. al coda (Dal segno al coda) or D.C. al coda (Da capo al coda).
Fine Marks the end of a composition or movement, usually following a repeat command such as D.C. al fine or D.S.
Direct symbol Used to indicate the first note on the next staff of the following page. Similar to a catchword in literature.

== Instrument-specific notation ==
=== Bowed string instruments ===
Left-hand pizzicato or Stopped note A note on a stringed instrument where the string is plucked with the left hand (the hand that usually stops the strings) rather than bowed.In some baroque music, this also indicates a trill.On the horn, this accent indicates a "stopped note" (a note played with the stopping hand shoved further into the bell of the horn). In percussion this notation denotes, among many other specific uses, to close the hi-hat by pressing the pedal, or that an instrument is to be "choked" (muted with the hand).
Snap pizzicato On a stringed instrument, a note played by stretching a string away from the frame of the instrument and letting it go, making it "snap" against the frame. Also known as a Bartók pizzicato.
Natural harmonic or Open note On a stringed instrument, this means to play a natural harmonic (also called flageolet). Sometimes, it also denotes that the note to be played is an open string. On a valved brass instrument, it means to play the note "open" (without lowering any valve, or without mute). In organ notation, this means to play a pedal note with the heel (above the note, use the right foot; below the note, use the left foot). In percussion notation this denotes, among many other specific uses, to open the hi-hat by releasing the pedal, or allow an instrument to ring.
Up bow or Sull'arco; On a bowed string instrument, the note is played while drawing the bow upward. On a plucked string instrument played with a plectrum or pick (such as a guitar played pickstyle or a mandolin), the note is played with an upstroke.
Down bow or Giù arco In contrast to the up bow, here the bow is drawn downward to create sound. On a plucked string instrument played with a plectrum or pick (such as a guitar played pickstyle or a mandolin), the note is played with a downstroke.
Con sordino ("with mute"); This symbol indicates that a mute is to be used.
Senza sordino ("without mute"); This symbol indicates that no mute is used. It is generally seen after a muted section.

=== Guitar ===
The guitar has a fingerpicking notation system derived from the names of the fingers in Spanish or Latin. They are written above, below, or beside the note to which they are attached. They read as follows:

Symbol	Spanish	Italian	Latin	English	French	Portuguese
p	pulgar	pollice	pollex	thumb	pouce	polegar
i	índice	indice	index	index	index	indicador
m	medio	medio	media	middle	majeur ou médius	médio
a	anular	anulare	anularis	ring	annulaire	anular
c, x, e, q	meñique	mignolo	minimus	little	auriculaire	mínimo

=== Piano ===
==== Pedal marks ====
Pedal marks appear in music for instruments with sustain pedals, such as the piano, vibraphone and chimes.

	Engage pedal Tells the player to put the sustain pedal down.
	Release pedal Tells the player to let the sustain pedal up.
	Variable pedal mark More accurately indicates the precise use of the sustain pedal. Initial depress and final release are indicated by the short vertical lines. The extended horizontal line tells the player to keep the sustain pedal depressed for all notes below which it appears. The inverted "V" (Λ) shape indicates the pedal is to be momentarily released, then depressed again.
U.C.	una corda or U.C. or 1 C. Tells the player to put the soft pedal down.
T.C.	tre corde or tutte le corde or T.C. or 3 C. Tells the player to let the soft pedal up.

==== Other piano notation ====
	Left hand	Right hand
English	L.H.	R.H.
English	left hand	right hand
German	l.H.	r.H.
German	linke Hand	rechte Hand
French	m.g.	m.d.
French	main gauche	main droite
Italian	m.s.	m.d.
Italian	mano sinistra	mano destra
Spanish	m.i.	m.d.
Spanish	mano izquierda	mano derecha

1, 2, 3, 4, 5	Finger identifications: 1 = thumb 2 = index 3 = middle 4 = ring 5 = little

Old (pre-1940) tutors published in the UK may use "English fingering". + for thumb, then 1 (index), 2 (middle), 3 (ring) and 4 (little).

=== Other stringed instruments ===
(With the exception of harp)

0, 1, 2, 3, 4	Finger identifications: 0 = open string (no finger used); 1 = index 2 = middle 3 = ring 4 = little

The thumb is also used by the cello and bass, usually denoted by ϙ (a circle with a line coming out the bottom), or, more rarely, a T.

=== Harp ===
Fingering numbers are similar to piano, except there is no "5" as the little finger is not used in playing the harp.

1 = thumb, 2 = index finger, 3 = middle finger, 4 = ring finger.

=== Four-mallet percussion ===
1, 2, 3, 4	Mallet identifications: 1 = Far left mallet 2 = Inner-left mallet 3 = Inner-right mallet 4 = Far right mallet

Some systems reverse the numbers (e.g., 4 = Far-left mallet, 3 = Inner-left mallet, etc.)

=== Six-mallet percussion ===
1, 2, 3, 4, 5, 6	Mallet identifications: 1 = Far-left mallet 2 = Middle-left mallet 3 = Inner-left mallet 4 = Inner-right mallet 5 = Middle-right mallet 6 = Far-right mallet

Numbers for six-mallet percussion may be reversed as well.

=== Organ ===
The organ has many different abbreviations for its keyboards in European languages.

	Great	Swell	Choir	Pedal	Solo	Orchestral	Antiphonal	Echo	Positiv
English	Great	Swell	Choir	Pedal	Solo	Orchestral	Antiphonal	Echo	Positiv
English	Gt. or G	Sw. or S	C. or Ch.	Ped. or Pd.	So.	Orch.	Ant.	Echo.	Pos.
German	Hauptwerk or Oberwerk	Schwellwerk or Brustwerk	Chor	Pedale	Solo	Orchester	Antiphonal	Widerhall	Positiv
German	Hw. or Ow.	Sw. or Bw.	Ch.	Ped.	Sol.	Orch.	Ant.	Echo.	Pos.
French	Grand-Orgue	Recit	Grand-Chœur	Pédale	Solo	Bombarde	Antiphonaire	Écho	Positif
French	G.O.	R.	G.C.	Ped. or Péd.	Sol.	Bom. or B.	Ant. (rare)	Écho.	Pos.
Dutch	Hoofdwerk	Zwelwerk	Koor	Pedaal	Solo	Bovenwerk	Antifonaal	Echo	Rugwerk
Dutch	Hw.	Zw.	K.	Ped.	Sol. or Solo	Bw. (not to be confused with German Brustwerk)	Ant.	Echo	Rw. (not to be confused with French recit)

== See also ==
- Glossary of musical terminology
- Chord notation
- Graphic notation
- Music theory
- Musical instruments
- Musical Symbols (Unicode block)
- Musical Symbols (disambiguation)
- Shape note
- Tone cluster
