= Maxima (music) =

Type of musical note

A white-mensural maxima with stem facing down.

The maxima rest appears as two adjacent longa rests.

A maxima, duplex longa, larga (in British usage: large), or octuple whole note was a musical note used commonly in thirteenth and fourteenth century music and occasionally until the end of the sixteenth century. It was usually twice or, rarely, three times as long as a longa, usually four or six or nine times as long as a breve, usually 8, 12, or 18, or, rarely, 27 times as long as a semibreve (whole note), and usually 16, 24, 36, or 54 or, rarely, 81 times as long as a minim (half note). Like the stem of the longa, the stem of the maxima generally pointed downwards except occasionally when it appeared on the bottom line or space. Before around 1430, the maxima was written with a solid, black body. Over the course of the fifteenth century, like most other note values, the head of the maxima became void.

In most early sources the duplex longa had twice the body of a longa, but before 1250 there is often no clear difference of shape and the presence of the duplex longa is instead merely suggested by a greater distance between the notes in the tenor (in score notation), caused by the greater number of notes in the upper parts. See "Mensural notation" for examples.

The name for this note in European languages is derived from two of the three Latin names, either maxima or larga.

In modern theoretical contexts, it is occasionally called an octuple whole note.

== See also ==
- List of musical symbols
