= Extrametricality =

Concept in linguistics

In linguistics, extrametricality is a tool for prosodic analysis of words in a language. In certain languages, a particular segment or prosodic unit of a word may be ignored for the purposes of determining the stress structure of the word. For example, in a language like classical Latin, where polysyllabic words never have stress on their final syllables, and the position of stress in a word is determined by looking at the penultimate and antepenultimate syllables only, it simplifies the linguistic formulation of the stress-assignment rules of Latin to say that the final syllable of a polysyllabic word is invisible to rules which determine stress. Such invisibility is called "extrametricality" in linguistic terminology. This is purely a theoretical device — an extrametrical sound or syllable is not observed to have any special pronunciation, and extrametricality can only be determined by analyzing the prosodic patterns of the language as a whole.

Most typically, extrametricality affects one specified segment or prosodic unit (mora, syllable, etc.) at the edge of a word (usually the end). Final-segment or final-mora extrametricality can be invoked to account for the phenomenon that word-final syllables often count as "lighter" than other syllables of the same rime type for purposes of determining the position of stress in a word.

== English ==
According to some analyses, an example of extrametricality is found in English, in which the final consonant of every word may be analysed as extrametrical. This explains the licensing of what would otherwise be superheavy (trimoraic) syllables in English as long as they are word-final (an example of this would be any final syllable containing a long vowel or diphthong and one or more coda consonants, e.g. main /ˈmeɪn/) but the lack of certain 4-mora syllables (such as those containing a long vowel or diphthong followed by a bimoraic [ŋ]). However, other analyses of these patterns which avoid the need for extrametricality are possible: it may be posited that Weight By Position on English applies only preconsonantally (although this leaves words ending in a long vowel and a coda cluster problematic); another analysis might propose that all English words end in a catalectic syllable, and the apparently word-final consonant(s) are parsed in the onset of this syllable.

== See also ==
- Anacrusis
