= Musical Symbols =

Musical Symbols may refer to:

- List of musical symbols, the set of codified marks used in modern musical notation
- Musical Symbols (Unicode block), a Unicode block of modern musical notation symbols
- Byzantine Musical Symbols, a Unicode block of Byzantine era musical notation symbols
- Ancient Greek Musical Notation, a Unicode block of symbols for the musical system of ancient Greece
