= Longa (music) =

Musical note

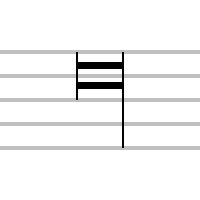
A longa in white mensural notation.

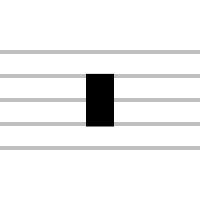
A longa rest (modern form) worth two breves.

A longa (pl. longae, or sometimes longs), long, quadruple note (Am.), or quadruple whole note is an early music musical note that could be either twice or three times as long as a breve (Am.: double whole note, or double note), and four, six, or nine times as long as a semibreve (Am.: whole note).

== History ==
=== Mensural notation and modus ===
The duration of the longa was governed by the modus (mood) of a composition:

- In perfect modus, a longa was ternary (perfect), equalling three breves.
- In imperfect modus, a longa was binary (imperfect), equalling two breves.

The subdivision of the breve into semibreves was called tempus (time), which could similarly be perfect (three semibreves) or imperfect (two semibreves). Depending on the combination of mood and time, a longa could therefore last four, six, or nine semibreves.

Two longae—or rarely three—comprised the value of a maxima (also called a duplex long). The theoretical value of a maximodus perfectus could be represented only by three longae or by a maxima accompanied by a longa.

=== Ligatures and pre-mensural usage ===
Prior to the innovations of Franco of Cologne in the mid-thirteenth century, the longa was in common usage in theoretical and practical sources primarily within pre-mensural ligatures (notational characters joining two or more notes together).

A ligature beginning with a longa was said to lack "propriety", while ligatures ending with a longa possessed "perfection", reflecting the contemporaneous convention that a "proper and perfect" rhythmic sequence consisted of a brevis followed by a longa:

- Ligatures beginning with a brevis and ending with a longa possessed both propriety and perfection.
- Ligatures beginning with a longa and ending with a brevis lacked both propriety and perfection.
- Ligatures beginning and ending with a longa lacked propriety but had perfection.
- Ligatures beginning and ending with a brevis were proper but not perfect.

=== Visual forms and obsolescence ===
Prior to c. 1450, the longa was typically written with a solid black (filled) notehead; void (unfilled) or red noteheads were reserved to designate an imperfect longa where a perfect longa would otherwise be expected. During the fifteenth century, the void notehead became standard in white mensural notation.

Unlike other mensural rests which generally retained the same form whether perfect or imperfect, longa rests often took distinct shapes: an imperfect rest crossed two staff spaces, whereas a perfect rest crossed three spaces.

Although described in theoretical treatises as late as 1667, by that time the note symbol was of purely historical and theoretical interest, as notational developments had rendered it too extended a duration for practical performance. In theoretical piano primers from the 19th century, such as J. F. Burrowes's, the longa is listed as a "quadruple note" equivalent to four whole notes, but is explicitly noted as being "very rare" in practical piano music. Although the longa note itself has been obsolete for more than three centuries, the vertical longa rest sign still survives in modern engraving conventions to denote multimeasure rests lasting exactly four measures.

== Modern notation and software support ==
When the longa occurs in modern notation (as supported by certain scorewriters), it is commonly assigned the rectangular or rounded notehead shape of a double whole note with an added stem, appearing as. In this context, it is often termed a quadruple whole note.

In LilyPond, the longa is encoded with the `\longa` command, and its stem resembles that of a half note rather than always appearing strictly on the right side of the notehead as in original mensural manuscripts:

== See also ==
- List of musical symbols
- Mensural notation
