= Anacrusis =

Brief syllable(s) beginning a poem or pickup note(s) in music

In poetic and musical meter, and by analogy in publishing, an anacrusis (from Ancient Greek: ἀνάκρουσις, anákrousis, literally: 'pushing up', plural anacruses) is a brief introduction. In music, it is also known as a pickup beat, pickup bar or fractional pick-up, i.e. a note or sequence of notes, a motif, which precedes the first downbeat in a bar in a musical phrase.

It is a set of syllables or notes, or a single syllable or note, which precedes what is considered the first foot of a poetic line (or the first syllable of the first foot) in poetry and the first beat (or the first beat of the first measure) in music that is not its own phrase, section, or line and is not considered part of the line, phrase, or section which came before, if any.

== Poetry ==
In poetry, a set of extrametrical syllables at the beginning of a verse is said to stand in anacrusis (Ancient Greek: ἀνάκρουσις "pushing up"). "An extrametrical prelude to the verse," or, "extrametrical unstressed syllables preceding the initial lift." The technique is seen in Old English poetry, and in lines of iambic pentameter, the technique applies a variation on the typical pentameter line causing it to appear at first glance as trochaic. Below, the anacrusis in the fourth line of William Blake's poem "The Tyger" (with punctuation modernized) is in italics:

Tyger, Tyger, burning bright
In the forests of the night,
What immortal hand or eye
Could frame thy fearful symmetry?

The poem is in trochaic tetrameter, in which the first syllable of each line is expected to be stressed, but the fourth line begins with the additional unstressed syllable "Could".

Anacrusis is an optional unstressed syllable that appears immediately before the first lift at the beginning of the verse. As an extrametrical element, it does not constitute an independent metrical position; rather, added as a supplement to the following stressed syllable, it counts as part of the lift.

== Music ==
The word anacrusis is introduced by Westphal ... The anacrusis merely consists of the unaccented note or notes which precede the first accent of any rhythmic division in a composition.

Beginning of J.S. Bach's BWV 736, with an anacrusis shown in red

In music, an anacrusis (also known as a pickup, or fractional pick-up) is a note or sequence of notes, a motif, which precedes the first downbeat in a bar in a musical phrase. Lerdahl and Jackendoff define anacrusis as "the span from the beginning of a group to the strongest beat in the group." Anacrusis, especially reoccurring anacrusis (anacrusis motif played before every measure or every other measure), "is a common means of weighting the first beat," and thus strengthening or articulating the meter.

The term is borrowed from the terminology of poetry. Anacruses may involve fine details such as rhythm and phrasing or may involve wider features such as musical form (such as when used repeatedly).

Very often, a melodic line will start with what is referred to as an anacrusis. An anacrusis is an unstressed pickup or lead-in note or group of notes that precedes the first accented note of a phrase (a short unit of musical line). The accented note of the phrase is found in the first complete measure of music.

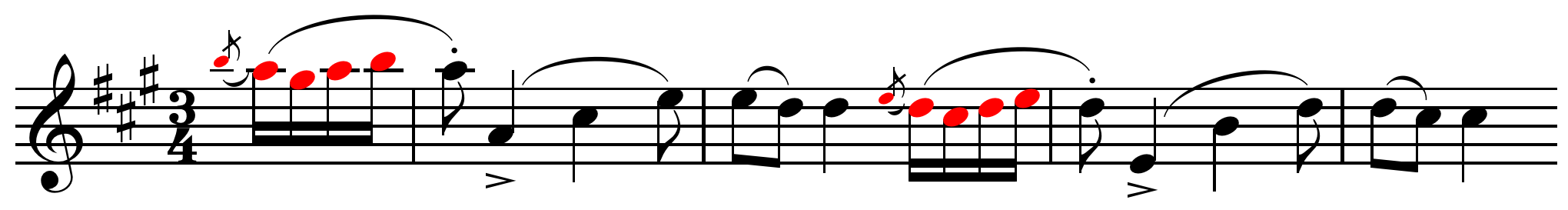
Anacrusis, in red, beginning Boccherini's Minuet

The anacrusis is a perceived grouping which is context generated in the individual phrasing of a concrete composition. The grouping of one or more antecedent tone events to a perceived phrase gestalt may be rhythmically evoked by their temporal proximity to the phrase's first downbeat (perceived phrase onset).

Although the anacrusis is integrated in a musical phrase gestalt (grouped to it), it is not located in the perceived 'body' of the phrase (which is spanning from its first downbeat to its ending beat) but before the phrase (hence the German term "Auftakt"; literally: "upbeat"). In this respect – in a sequence of phrases – the anacrusis also may be perceived 'between' two phrases, neither being perceived as part of the ending of a former one, nor being located in the following one.

When a melody begins with an anacrusis, the phrasing and inflection must be thought of in terms of the first significant tone of the melody. If we focus on the important tone we are moving toward, the anacrusis will naturally lead there with proper nuance. [emphasis added]

This idea of directionality of beats is significant when you translate its effect on music. The crusis of a measure or a phrase is a beginning; it propels sound and energy forward, so the sound needs to lift and have forward motion to create a sense of direction. The anacrusis leads to the crusis, but doesn't have the same 'explosion' of sound; it serves as a preparation for the crusis.

Outside of that the term of the anacrusis is most commonly used where it applies everywhere else 'within' the 'body' of the phrase between the 'head' (first downbeat) and the 'foot' (ending beat) where, by what ever musical means, a grouping is perceived from an upbeat to a downbeat (especially also to the phrases ending beat).

Anacrusis, or upbeat, seems rather like a continuation released from its dependency on a prior beginning, unanchored, and (in some cases) seeming to come, as it were, 'from nowhere.' Anacrusis points forward: it is anticipatory, directed toward a future event.

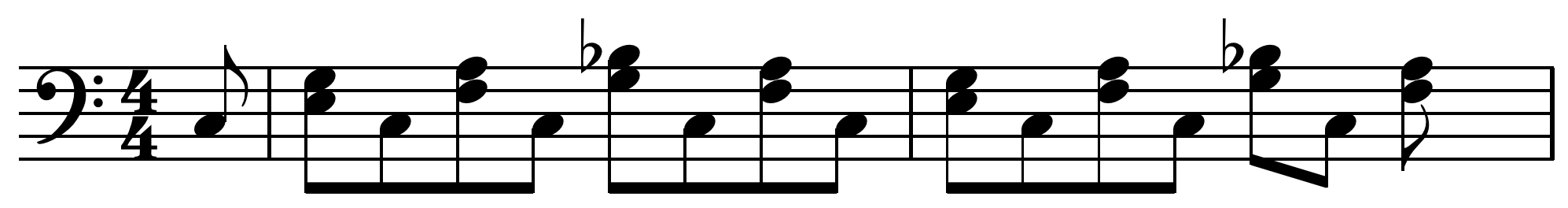
Shuffle pattern (accompaniment), begins on the upbeat and ends with a measure thus shortened

Since an anacrusis "is an incomplete measure that allows the composition [or section or phrase] to start on a beat other than one," if an anacrusis is present, the first bar after the anacrusis is assigned bar number 1, and Western standards for musical notation often include the recommendation that when a piece of music begins with an anacrusis, the notation should omit a corresponding number of beats from the final bar of the piece, or the final bar before a repeat sign, in order to keep the length of the entire piece at a whole number of bars. This final partial measure is the complement. However, an anacrusis may last an entire bar.

=== Examples ===
- In the song "Happy Birthday to You", Happy is the anacrusis and the accent is on the first syllable of Birthday.
- In "The Star-Spangled Banner", the word O! in the first line is an anacrusis in the music:

x	/	x	x	/	x	x	/	x	x	/
O!	say	can	you	see,	by	the	dawn's	ear-	ly	light	. . .

- At the beginning of the Beatles' "Yellow Submarine", "In the" is the anacrusis, while "town" falls on the downbeat.

== Other fields ==
In academic publishing, the term is sometimes used in an article to mark an introductory idea standing between the abstract and the introduction proper.

== See also ==
- Caesura
- Catalexis
- Count off
- Prosody (music)
- Scansion
- Tacet
