= Double whole note =

Musical note duration

Left: breve in modern notation. Centre: breve in mensural notation used in some modern scores as the first form.

In music, a double whole note (American), breve or double note lasts two times as long as a whole note (or semibreve). it is occasionally found but is very rare in modern music.

The next longest notated note is the longa, which is double the length of the breve. The longest notated note (though now obsolete except in some contexts) is the maxima.

== History ==
In medieval mensural notation, the brevis was one of the shortest note lengths in use, hence its name, which is the Latin etymon of "brief". In perfect modus (mood), the brevis was a third of a longa, or in imperfect modus, half a longa.

== Form ==
In modern notation, a breve is commonly represented in either of two ways: by a hollow oval note head, like a whole note, with one or two vertical lines on either side, as on the left and right of the image, or as the rectangular shape also found in older notation, shown in the middle of the image.

Because it lasts longer than a bar in most modern time signatures in common use, the breve is rarely encountered except in English music, where the half-note is often used as the beat unit.

== Breve (double-whole) rest ==
Breve rest

A related symbol is the double whole rest (double rest or breve rest), which usually denotes a silence for the same duration.) Double whole rests are drawn as filled-in rectangles occupying the whole vertical space between the second and third lines from the top of the musical staff. They are often used in long silent passages which are not divided into separate bars to indicate a rest of two bars, regardless of the duration of each bar. This and longer rests are collectively known as multiple rests. They are also used to represent whole bar rest for time signature 4/2 only.

== Alla breve ==
Alla breve, the time signature 2/2, takes its name from the note value breve. In the mensural notation of the Renaissance, it was an alternative term for proportio dupla, which meant that the brevis was to be considered the unit of time (tactus), instead of the usual semibrevis. The old symbol, used as an alternative to the numerical proportion 2:1 in mensural notation, is carried over into modern notational practice to indicate a smaller relative value per note shape. It is normally used for music in a relatively quick tempo, where it indicates two minim (half note) beats in a bar of four crotchets (quarter notes), while is the equivalent of 4/4, with four crotchet beats.

== See also ==
- List of musical symbols
