= Quarter note =

Musical note duration

A quarter note (crotchet) with stem pointing up, a quarter note with stem pointing down, and a quarter rest

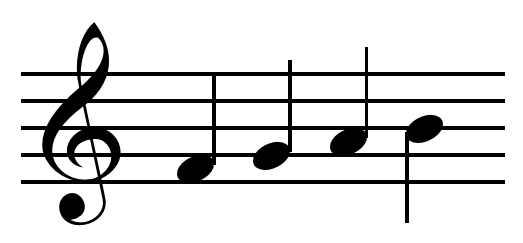
Four quarter notes

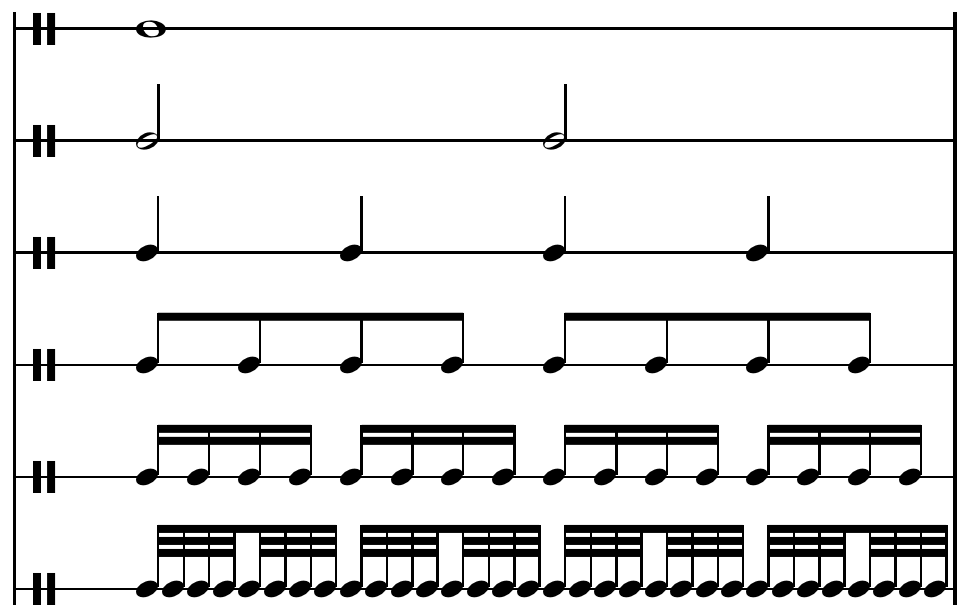
Comparison of duple note values: = 2×, etc.

Drum pattern, s on bass and snare, accompanied by ride patterns of various duple lengths from to 128th (all at =60)
1	2	4	8
16	32	64	128

A quarter note (AmE) or crotchet (BrE) (/ˈkrɒtʃɪt/) is a musical note played for one quarter of the duration of a whole note (or semibreve). Quarter notes are notated with a filled-in oval note head and a straight, flagless stem. The stem usually points upwards if it is below the middle line of the staff, and downwards if it is on or above the middle line. An upward stem is placed on the right side of the notehead, a downward stem is placed on the left (see image). The Unicode symbol is U+2669 (♩).

A quarter rest (or crotchet rest) denotes a silence of the same duration as a quarter note or crotchet. It is notated with the symbol. In some older music it was notated with symbol. (Note: Examples of the older symbol are found in English music up to the late 19th century, e.g. W. A. Mozart Requiem Mass, vocal score ed. W. T. Best, pub. London: Novello & Co. Ltd. 1879.)

== History ==
The quarter note equates to the semiminima ('half minim') of mensural notation. The word "crotchet" comes from Old French crochet, meaning 'little hook', diminutive of croc, 'hook', because of the hook used on the note in black notation of the medieval period.

As the name implies, a quarter note's duration is one quarter that of a whole note, half the length of a half note, and twice that of an eighth note. It represents one beat in a bar of 4/4 time. The term "quarter note" is a calque (loan-translation) of the German term Viertelnote.

In the Romance languages of Catalan, French, Galician, and Spanish, the name of this note and its equivalent rest is derived from the Latin negra meaning 'black'—as the semiminima was the longest note to be colored in mensural white notation. This is still true of the note's modern form. The Bulgarian, Chinese, Croatian, Czech, Japanese, Korean, Norwegian, Polish, Russian, Serbian and Slovak names mean "quarter" (for the note) and "quarter's pause" (for the rest).

== See also ==
- List of musical symbols
