= Whole note =

Musical note duration

Figure 1. A whole note and a whole rest.

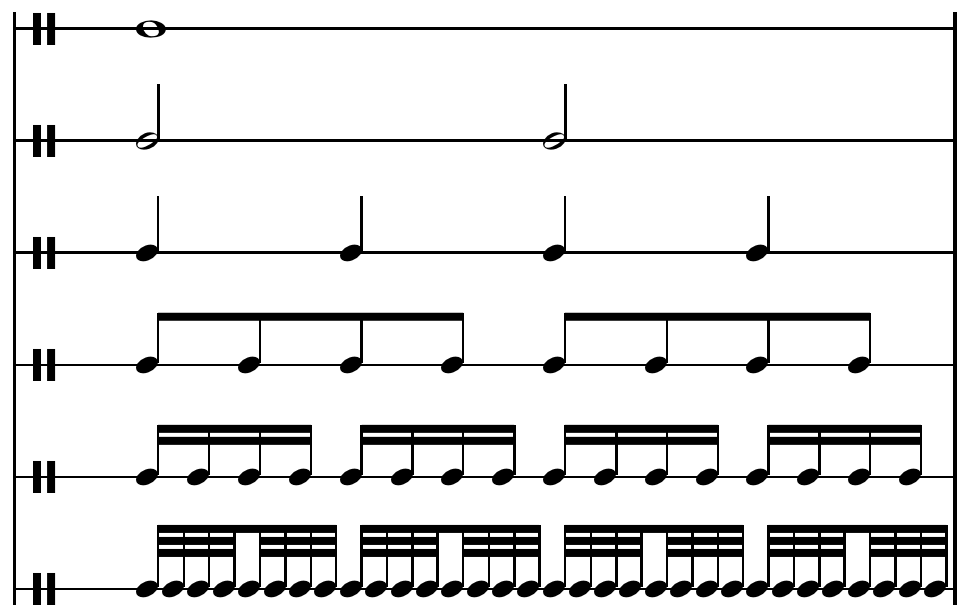
Comparison of duple note values: = 2×, etc.

Drum pattern, s on bass and snare, accompanied by ride patterns of various duple lengths from to 128th (all at =60)
| 1 | 2 | 4 | 8 |
| 16 | 32 | 64 | 128 |

A whole note (American) or semibreve (British) in musical notation is a single note equivalent to or lasting as long as two half notes or four quarter notes.

== Description ==
The whole note or semibreve has a note head in the shape of a hollow oval—like a half note (or minim)—but with no note stem (see Figure 1). Since it is equal to four quarter notes, it occupies the entire length of a measure in 4/4 time.

Other notes are multiples or fractions of the whole note. For example, a double whole note (or breve) lasts twice the duration of the whole note, a half note lasts one half the duration, and a quarter note (or crotchet) lasts one quarter the duration.

A related symbol is the whole rest (or semibreve rest), which signifies a rest for the duration of a whole note. Whole rests are drawn as filled-in rectangles generally hanging under the second line from the top of a musical staff, though they may occasionally be put under a different line (or ledger line) in more complicated polyphonic passages, or when two instruments or vocalists are written on one staff.

When an entire bar is devoid of notes, a whole (semibreve) rest placed at the middle of the measure is used, regardless of the actual time signature.

Less commonly, the whole note may be used to denote a whole measure in music of free rhythm, such as Anglican chant, irrespective of the time of the measure.

== History ==
The whole note symbol is first found in music notation from the late thirteenth century (Morehen and Rastall 2001). It derives from the round, stemless semibrevis of mensural notation, hence the origin of the British name.

== Nomenclature ==
The British term is taken from Italian semibreve, itself built upon Latin semi- "half" and brevis "short." The American whole note is a calque of the German ganze Note. Some languages derive the name of the note from its round shape, such as Catalan rodona, French ronde, and Spanish redonda. The Greek name means "whole". The Chinese, Japanese, Korean, and Vietnamese names mean "whole note".

== See also ==
- List of musical symbols
