= Recovery of funds from the Madoff investment scandal =

Efforts since scandal broke in December 2008

The recovery of funds from the Madoff investment scandal has been underway since the scandal broke in December 2008. That month, recovery trustee Irving Picard received funds from the Bank of New York account where Bernard Madoff held new investments into his Ponzi scheme. As it has been concluded that no legitimate investments were made on the investors' behalf for at least the last 12 years of operation, recovery has proceeded on a "money in/money out" basis. Investors are entitled to receive no more than the nominal cash amounts that they paid in and did not subsequently withdraw, without regard to inflation, interest, opportunity cost or the false statements that Madoff provided them. Those statements combined to a total balance of approximately $64 billion, while the admitted claims amount to $20.3 billion.

Madoff provided a confidential list of his assets and those of his firm (BLMIS) to the SEC on December 31, 2008, which was subsequently disclosed on March 13, 2009, in a court filing. Madoff had no Individual Retirement Accounts, no 401(k), no Keogh plan, no other pension plan and no annuities. He owned less than a combined $200,000 in securities in Lehman Brothers, Morgan Stanley, Fidelity Investments, Bear Stearns, and M&T Bank. No offshore or Swiss bank accounts were listed. The SEC withheld further information about the assets to prevent them from being seized by foreign regulators and foreign creditors.

As of March 2026, the trustee had recovered $15.3 billion toward these claims through legal action against Madoff associates, feeder funds and beneficiaries of the scheme, and had made seventeen distributions to investors. Action by the Department of Justice recovered an additional $4.3 billion.

== Combined assets ==
Ruth Madoff's combined assets with her husband had a net worth of between $823 million and $826 million. She had $92.6 million in assets listed in her own name: the $7 million penthouse on Manhattan's Upper East Side; an $11 million mansion in Palm Beach, Florida; a three-bedroom apartment in Cap d'Antibes on the French Riviera valued at $1.5 million; $45 million in municipal bonds and $17 million in cash; $8.8 million worth of yachts; and $2.6 million worth of jewelry. The SEC is working with federal prosecutors, who have filed a notice with the Federal Court to seek forfeiture of all listed ill-gotten assets.

On March 17, 2009, prosecutors filed a document listing more assets including $2.6 million in jewelry and about 35 sets of watches and cufflinks, more than $30 million in loans owed to the couple by their late sons, and Ruth Madoff's interest in real estate funds sponsored by Sterling Equities, whose partners include Fred Wilpon. Ruth Madoff, and Peter Madoff, invested as "passive limited partners" in real estate funds sponsored by the company, as well as other venture investments. Assets also include the Madoffs' interest in Hoboken Radiology LLC in Hoboken, New Jersey; Delivery Concepts LLC, an online food ordering service in midtown Manhattan that operates as "delivery.com"; an interest in Madoff La Brea LLC; an interest in the restaurant, P.J. Clarke's on the Hudson LLC; and Boca Raton, Florida-based Viager II LLC.

On March 2, 2009, Judge Louis L. Stanton modified an existing freeze order to surrender assets Madoff owns: his securities firm, real estate, artwork, and entertainment tickets, and granted a request by prosecutors that the existing freeze remain in place for the Manhattan apartment, and vacation homes in Montauk, New York, and Palm Beach, Florida. He has also agreed to surrender his interest in Primex Holdings LLC, a joint venture between Madoff Securities and several large brokerages, designed to replicate the auction process on the New York Stock Exchange. Madoff's April 14, 2009, opening day New York Mets tickets were sold for $7,500 on eBay.

On March 31, 2009, the town of Fairfield, Connecticut, which lost $42 million, was granted a temporary restraining order to freeze and secure all real estate property owned by the Madoffs and the homes of his inner circle in Greenwich, including personal property and financial accounts of Madoff, his relatives and executives with Fairfield Greenwich Group, Maxam Capital and other firms that allegedly fed Madoff's fund, which could allow Fairfield to recover up to $75 million.

On June 25, Madoff agreed to forfeit his share of $170 million of real estate, investments and other assets, with his wife forfeiting $80 million. Ruth Madoff retained $2.5 million as part of the agreement. The assets will be sold by federal marshals.

In Jan 2010, Madoff's Manhattan Penthouse at 133 East 64th Street was sold to Alfred R. Kahn, marketer of the Cabbage Patch Kids dolls, for approx. $8.9m, a million less than the original asking price.

== Irving Picard, Trustee ==
The court-appointed trustee for the Madoff Case, Irving Picard, and lawyers from his firm, Baker Hostetler LLP (a Cleveland-based firm which Picard joined the week before he was appointed), are locating assets for distribution to investors. U.S. District Judge Lawrence McKenna gave Picard power to seize assets and records, demand documents, summon witnesses, and enter Madoff's residences around the world, including his Manhattan penthouse.

=== Claim procedures ===
On January 2, 2009, Picard sent letters to 8,000 potential claimants – advising customers they had until March 2, 2009, and creditors, until July 2, 2009, to place claims.

On February 20, 2009, Picard, at a meeting with Madoff creditors, who include individual investors, banks, charities and others, indicated that his investigation has to date not found any evidence that any securities were purchased on behalf of customers in at least 13 years. It was "cash in and cash out." He identified more than $830 million in liquid assets that may be subject to recovery. David Sheehan, a lawyer working for Picard, indicated: "We are looking at every member of the Madoff family."

On April 23, 2009, Picard said he would not seek to recover funds from "net losers" in the fraud, referring to those who lost more than they withdrew over time, but those investors must prove it. 223 investors who have a direct personal relationship with the Madoff clan have received letters seeking the return of funds totaling $735 million they redeemed from the Madoff firm as many as six years before the firm collapsed—the time limit allowed under New York law. Known as the legal doctrine of fraudulent conveyance in bankruptcy proceedings means that investors who withdrew their money before the fraud was revealed may be compelled to return their profits or even part of their initial investments. Many of these 223 investors – Madoff's relatives, employees, and their relatives, and those managers who fed billions of dollars of investors' money to him, withdrew funds within the previous 90 days of Madoff's December 10, 2008, arrest.

=== Seizures and clawbacks ===
As of May 14, 2009, lawsuits to recover $10.1 billion in fictitious profits had been filed.

On March 16, 2009, a bankruptcy court filing indicated the British enclave of Gibraltar had found $75 million in Madoff assets.

On April 9, 2009, Irving Picard sued Gibraltar-based Banque Jacob Safra in Manhattan Federal Bankruptcy Court seeking $150 million Madoff wired as a "preferential payment" to the bank, invested on behalf of Vizcaya Partners, a British Virgin Islands company. Beginning in 2002, Vizcaya had wired a total of $327 million to Madoff's investment firm through 26 different wire transfers, by the end of October 2008. Coincidentally, Madoff's parents had an investment business called Gibraltar Securities, registered in his mother's name, using their home as the business address. In January 1964, the SEC dropped their investigation when Sylvia agreed to close "her" business.

On March 23, 2009, the bankruptcy trustee disclosed that French authorities were going to seize the French Riviera apartment on behalf of customers allegedly swindled in France. The property, listed in Ruth Madoff's name located in Cap d'Antibes, was worth about $1 million, and contained approximately $900,000 in furnishings.

On April 17, 2009, Picard sued Kingate Management Ltd. for the return of $255 million transferred to it shortly before Madoff Investment's collapse. Beginning in the mid-1990s, feeder funds Kingate Global and Kingate Euro, created by Carlo Grosso, channeled $1.7 billion of his client's money to Madoff. The funds were registered in the British Virgin Islands. The complaint also named Bank of Bermuda Ltd., a unit of HSBC Holdings Plc, as a defendant. The bank wired the money.

On May 7, 2009, Madoff Bankruptcy Trustee, Irving Picard filed a lawsuit against J. Ezra Merkin, seeking to recover almost $500 million withdrawn from Madoff accounts in the prior six years. The complaint alleged that since 1995, Merkin steered more than $1 billion to Madoff through three private hedge funds, Ascot Partners, Ariel Fund, and Gabriel Capital. Since 2002, the funds withdrew at least $494 million from Madoff — returns that Merkin "knew or should have known" were fraudulent. There were at least 500 instances in the prior ten years when his Madoff account statements showed large blocks of stock bought or sold at prices that did not match the stock's trading range for the day when the transactions supposedly occurred. The case number was 08-01789 (BRL): IRVING H. PICARD, Trustee for the Liquidation of Bernard L. Madoff Investment Securities LLC, v. J. EZRA MERKIN. On May 18, 2009, Merkin agreed to New York Attorney General Andrew Cuomo's demands to step down as manager of his hedge funds and place them into receivership.

On May 12, 2009, Picard sued Harley International (Cayman) Ltd., which invested more than $2 billion with Madoff, receiving an average annual return of 13.5%. The lawsuit alleges the Cayman Islands-based fund ignored warning signs that should have alerted it to the fraud. Harley withdrew more than $1 billion from the firm in the two years before its collapse on December 11, 2008, including $425 million in those last three months.

On May 18, 2009, Picard sued Fairfield Greenwich Group, seeking the return of $3.2 billion during the period from 2002 to Madoff's arrest in December 2008. $1.2 billion was withdrawn in the final three months of the fraud. Since 1995, the Fairfield funds invested about $4.5 billion with Bernard L. Madoff Investment Securities LLC, or BLMIS, through 242 wire transfers. The funds are Fairfield Sentry Ltd., Greenwich Sentry LP, and Greenwich Sentry Partners LP. However, the money may already be in the hands of Fairfield's own clients, who are likely off-limits to Picard, since they were not direct investors with Madoff.

On June 22, 2009, Picard filed a claim against Cohmad Securities founder Maurice "Sonny" Cohn, daughter Marcia Cohn, and Robert Jaffe, among more than two dozen individuals and trusts in U.S. Bankruptcy Court in New York. The lawsuit claimed that up to 90 percent of Cohmad's income came from referring clients and that the firm had a "symbiotic" relationship with Madoff, having earned hundreds of millions of dollars from the fraud. The lawsuit sought more than $100 million paid to Cohmad six years prior to Madoff's firm declaring bankruptcy, and more than $105 million in profits Cohmad employees and their families withdrew from the investment accounts they held with Madoff. The case is Picard v. Cohmad Securities Corp., 09-AP-1305, U.S. Bankruptcy Court, Southern District of New York (Manhattan).

On June 26, 2009, Judge Chin ordered Madoff to personally forfeit $170 million in assets, and his wife, Ruth agreed to relinquish her claims to more than $80 million and to retain only $2.5 million. The order allowed the U.S. Securities and Exchange Commission (SEC) and Irving Picard to continue to pursue Ruth Madoff's funds, and on July 29, 2009, Irving Picard sued her for $45 million.

Madoff-owned United States properties were auctioned unfurnished after Labor Day 2009; artwork and possessions, including boats, were to be auctioned later. Madoff's home at 216 Old Montauk Highway, Montauk, New York, was sold for $9.4 million to real estate investor Steven Roth of Vornado Realty Trust. Madoff's mansion at 410 North Lake Way, Palm Beach, was still on the market as of August 2010; in February 2010 the asking price for the property was lowered to $7.25 million, below the initial asking price of $8.49 million and the previous reduced asking price of $7.9 million. In May 2010, Madoff's penthouse at 133 East 64th Street in Manhattan was sold to Al and Patsy Kahn for $8 million, a markdown from the original asking price of $9.9 million and the reduced listing price of $8.9 million.

On April 1, 2009, the United States Marshals Service seized Madoff's several boats from marinas on Florida's east coast; these included a restored, custom-made 1969 Rybovich wooden antique fishing yacht, Bull, valued at $2.2 million, featuring a hydraulic elevator and teak woodwork, as well as several other boats ' as well as personal property within the family home in Palm Beach, Florida.

On November 19, 2009, many items formerly belonging to Madoff were auctioned off at a private auction conducted by the U.S. Marshals Service. Bull was sold at auction for $700,000 to an unknown buyer. At the same auction other items formerly belonging to Madoff were sold, including a 38-foot 2003 Shelter Island Runabout Sport, Sitting Bull, which sold for $320,000 and a 24-foot 2000 center console from Maverick Boat Company, Little Bull, which sold for $21,000. A 61-foot 2003 Viking sport-fishing yacht formerly owned by Frank DiPascali sold for $950,000. A black 1999 Mercedes-Benz CLK 320 convertible with 12,827 miles on it, owned by Ruth Madoff, sold for $30,000. The Manhattan penthouse and Montauk Long Island summer home were seized in July 2009.

Picard planned to sell Madoff's plane and his interest in NetJets.

In an interview in July 2010, Picard said that he could potentially end up suing about half of the estimated 2,000 individual investors who withdrew more from Madoff's funds than they had invested. These investors claim such recovery would cause personal hardships. For example, one 87-year-old former school secretary had made mandatory withdrawals from her retirement account and had paid taxes on the withdrawals, but Picard had sent her two letters seeking repayment of $691,372. On November 12, 2010, Picard sued five former Madoff employees: former head of operations Daniel Bonventre, former controller Enrica Cotellessa-Pitz, trader David Kugel, and employees Annette Bongiorno and Jo Ann Crupi. The suit seeks recovery of $70 million in allegedly fraudulent transfers. On November 17, 2010, Picard filed a clawback lawsuit seeking recover of $20.4 million in false profits from Melvyn I. Weiss and David J. Bershad, who had both previously pleaded guilty to racketeering charges in an earlier securities fraud case involving kickbacks to clients.

==== Stanley Chais; widow and estate ====
On May 1, 2009, Irving Picard filed a lawsuit against Stanley Chais, 82. The complaint alleged Chais "knew or should have known" he was deep in a Ponzi scheme when his family investments with Madoff averaged 40% annual returns on investment and sometimes soared as high as 300%. It also claimed Chais was a primary beneficiary of the scheme for at least 30 years, allowing his family to withdraw more than $1 billion from their accounts since 1995 – money that belonged to Madoff victims. The case number was Picard v. Chais, 09-01172.

Stanley Chais was a wealthy investment advisor from Beverly Hills, California, who was accused of steering money to private interests, including Madoff, through Chais's Brighton Co., a limited partnership formed to manage money. He took about 3.8% of the profits as management fees. His Chais Family Foundation, which in 2007 reported assets of $178 million and charitable contributions of nearly $8.2 million, was wiped out and has shut down. He had a home in Beverly Hills, and an apartment in New York. (See Participants in the Madoff investment scandal.) Chais died on September 26, 2010, at age 84, in Manhattan, where he and his wife had moved to further the treatment of a blood disorder that eventually took his life.

The widow, children, family, and estate of Chais settled with Picard in 2016 for $277 million. On November 19, 2016, the United States Bankruptcy Court for the Southern District of New York approved a global settlement – made in cooperation with the California Attorney General - with the defendants in Picard v. the Estate of Stanley Chais, et al. The agreement was made with the Stanley Chais estate, Chais’s widow, children, and a number of other Chais family members, investment funds, trusts, companies, and other entities associated with Chais. Under the terms of the agreement, the BLMIS Customer Fund received $277 million, including a cash payment of $258.47 million, as well as the assignment of other assets that would be liquidated over time. All proceeds of the settlement were to go to the BLMIS Customer Fund for the benefit of BLMIS customers with allowed claims. Picard’s lawyers said the settlement covered all of Chais’ estate and substantially all of his widow’s assets, and represented “a good faith, complete and total compromise.”

==== Jeffry Picower; widow and estate ====
On May 12, 2009, Picard filed a $5 billion lawsuit against Jeffry Picower, his wife, Barbara, and the Picower Foundation. The complaint alleged the Picowers, friends of Madoff for decades, "knew or should have known they were benefiting from fraudulent activity or, at a minimum, failed to exercise reasonable due diligence." The Palm Beach, Florida, foundation had given millions to the Massachusetts Institute of Technology, Human Rights First, and the New York Public Library. It also funded diabetes research at Harvard Medical School and Parkinson's research at Columbia Medical School. On July 31, 2009, Picower filed a motion to dismiss the claim, saying that he "genuinely believed in the personal and professional integrity of Bernie Madoff." He urged the Court that the lawsuit was a "paradigm of excess" that reflected a "frenzied effort" to recover large sums from one of Madoff's wealthiest investors. On October 25, 2009, Picower, who was 67 years old, was found dead at the bottom of his Palm Beach, Florida swimming pool. The Picowers' lawyer, William D. Zabel of Schulte Roth & Zabel, said that, "They were totally shocked by his fraud and were in no way complicit in it."

On December 17, 2010, it was announced that a settlement of $7.2 billion had been reached between Irving Picard and Barbara Picower, Picower's widow, the executor of the Picower estate to resolve the Madoff trustee suit, and repay losses in the Madoff fraud. It was the largest single forfeiture in American judicial history. "Barbara Picower has done the right thing," US Attorney Preet Bharara said.

==== Banco Santander SA ====
Geneva's public prosecutor Dario Zanni, confirmed on June 20, 2009, that he had opened a criminal investigation into allegations that Banco Santander SA's Optimal Investment Services S.A., based in Geneva, defrauded clients by misrepresenting its relationship with Madoff and the due diligence it was carrying out on Madoff's activities. The criminal complaint was filed by an independent asset manager.

On June 16, 2009, Judge Burton Lifland approved the settlement between Picard and Banco Santander SA's Optimal Investment Services. The Optimal SUS fund, one of Madoff's largest feeder funds, agreed to pay $235 million, about 85% of the $285 million that the Geneva-based hedge fund group redeemed in the 90 days before Madoff was arrested. As of December 2008, Santander had $3.2 billion of clients' money invested with Madoff, a relationship that started in 1996. The fund continues to have claims against Madoff's estate. The largest Spanish bank earned nearly $100 million in management fees in 2006 and 2007 combined selling the feeder fund. Santander lost €17 million ($23.8 million) of its own money. 70% of its affected clients are in Latin America. In April, Santander offered its clients compensation for losses from the fraud, and 93% of clients affected by the Madoff fraud had accepted, which it originally valued at €1.38 billion. The offer has been widely criticized.

==== Fairfield Greenwich Group ====
On July 20, 2010, Picard amended his lawsuit against the Fairfield Greenwich Group claiming it had "actual and constructive knowledge" of the Madoff fraud. Picard was seeking to recover almost $7 billion from Fairfield, claiming that it had facilitated the fraud by operating feeder funds. Fairfield had previously settled a suit filed by the Massachusetts Secretary of the Commonwealth for $8 million to cover losses of 15 investors from that state.

=== Value of recovered assets ===
As of 26 February 2018, Picard announced a new recovery disbursement of $621 million, bringing the net recovery up to $11.4 billion. Picard is holding another $1.8 billion is held in reserve for contested claims. A separate fund run by the Department of Justice distributed $723 million in November 2017, with another $3 billion in that fund remaining to be distributed.

As of September 1, 2010, Picard had reported approximately $1.5 billion found. Eight lawsuits against Madoff's biggest "feeder funds" and other investors seek a total of $13.7 billion in damages. $301,407,190 of The Bank of New York Mellon's funds were in one Madoff company account, and $233,500,000 of JP Morgan Chase's funds in three other accounts.

On October 31, 2008, Craig Kugel, human resource employee, was "designated" a trustee by Peter Madoff, who told him to sign a lease for his brother, as guarantor for a Mercedes S-550, because Madoff refused to provide the requisite company credit information. A Bankruptcy Court Judge Burton Lifland denied Kugel's estimated remaining $58,212 lease liability.

Picard terminated Madoff's leases totaling $117,359 of a 2007 Land Rover, 2008 Cadillac, 2007, 2008, and 2009 Mercedes-Benzes, and a 2006 Lexus.

On April 28, 2009, it was disclosed that the Bank of New York held $7 million in six Madoff accounts.

=== BLMIS ===
==== Business expenses ====
A May 5, 2009, court motion to consolidate business and personal assets, discloses that Madoff used $2.7 million of his firm's cash to pay for a home in New Jersey for a longtime employee, JoAnn Crupi. The firm lent nearly $11 million to Madoff's sons Andrew and Mark for real estate purchases. He also gave a $9 million loan to his brother Peter in 2007, none of which were ever repaid. The firm also gave money to two entities owned by Madoff family members, including $1.7 million in capital contributions to Madoff Energy Holdings LLC, owned by Andrew, Mark and Shana Madoff, who also worked at the firm. The Madoff firm also paid out $4.5 million to support Ruth Madoff's real-estate-related investments. More than $11.5 million was used to buy two yachts for the Madoff family. The firm provided corporate cards to his wife, Ruth, his son's wife and brother's wife, even though they didn't work at the firm. In January 2009, Madoff and his wife, Ruth, spent more than $100,000 on the firm's American Express Corporate Card: $1,564 at Bistro Chez Jean-Pierre in Palm Beach, Fla.; $2,000 at Georgio Armani in Paris; and $2,813 at the Apple computer store in New York. Peter Madoff's wife, Marion, was not employed, but was paid a salary of $163,500 by the Madoff firm last year. Madoff also paid out $471,000 to a marina in Long Island and nearly $1 million to exclusive country clubs including the Breakers, the Atlantic Country Club on Long Island, the Palm Beach Country Club and the Trump International Golf Club. Madoff paid the salary of the captain of a boat owned by Frank DiPascali. as well as his personal boat captain, his maid and his house-sitter in Florida.

==== Sale to Castor Pollux ====
Madoff had estimated the value of his Manhattan business as $700 million which included both the investment management unit and the market-making operation. At an April 27, 2009, Castor Pollux Securities LLC won the bidding for the acquisition of the assets related to the market making business of BLMIS. Castor Pollux will pay $1,000,000 at closing and up to $24.5 million in deferred compensation through December 2013. Three bidders competed in the auction. One entity that had submitted a bid on April 22, 2009, withdrew its bid prior to the auction. On April 30, 2009, the sale was approved by the Bankruptcy Court.

==== Lease termination ====
On July 1, 2009, Trustee Picard agreed to take over the 1986 lease on behalf of the FBI for at least another year of the investigation.

=== Chapter 7, Involuntary Personal Bankruptcy consolidation with SIPA liquidation of BLMIS ===
On April 10, 2009, U.S. District Judge Louis Stanton reversed his December 18, 2008, ruling and ordered that investors can force Madoff into personal bankruptcy proceedings, against the wishes of federal prosecutors and the Securities and Exchange Commission who claim it unnecessary and costly.

On April 13, 2009, a petition by creditors Blumenthal & Associates Florida General Partnership, Martin Rappaport Charitable Remainder Unitrust, Martin Rappaport, Marc Cherno and Steven Morganstern was filed. The filing said their $64 million in claims against Mr. Madoff are based on the balances contained in the last statements they received from his firm. Claims are based on breach of contract, conversion, and fraud.

On April 17, 2009, Denny Chin, the U.S. District Judge presiding in Madoff's criminal case, separately granted a motion by prosecutors to restrain the transfer of assets held by Madoff or his wife, Ruth, and be subject to criminal forfeiture proceedings, rather than the bankruptcy proceedings.

=== SIPC ===
On June 10, 2009, Judge Burton Lifland allowed Picard's request to consolidate two court proceedings—those involving the liquidation of Bernard L. Madoff Investment Securities LLC, brought by Securities Investor Protection Corporation (SIPC) and Madoff's involuntary personal-bankruptcy case, claiming "it was virtually impossible to separate Madoff's affairs from those of his company. The SIPC case is Securities Investor Protection Corp. v. Bernard L. Madoff Investment Securities LLC, 08-01789, U.S. Bankruptcy Court, Southern District of New York (Manhattan).

On January 6, 2009, Picard and lawyers from his firm said some investors may get cash advances from SIPC well before March 4, 2009.

SIPC is a securities-industry fund formed by the United States Congress to help customers of failed brokerage firms. SIPC has $1.7 billion in assets, $1 billion in credit available from the U.S. Treasury, and another credit line from several international banks. Investors may each receive a maximum of $500,000 from SIPC, but only for cash or securities that are missing from their accounts. It could take several years before all investigations into the scandal are concluded and some investors are able to file claims.

On February 20, 2009, Picard, at a meeting with Madoff creditors who include individual investors, banks, charities. and others, confirmed that customers can each recover up to the $500,000 under the Securities Investor Protection Act. David Sheehan, a lawyer working for Picard, indicated that the SIPC will be trying to recover "false profits" earned by some investors. "It was all just made up. ... You got somebody else's money."

As of September 3, 2010, a total of $722,970,275.94 of Securities Investor Protection Corporation (SIPC) funds have been committed in determination letters sent to 2212 claimants in the Securities Investor Protection Act (SIPA) liquidation proceeding. As of September 3, 2010, a total of 13,331 customer claims have been filed in connection with 3,565 customer accounts at BLMIS. Many of the rejected claims were due to the fact that they were from customers of feeder funds and not direct BLMIS customers, also numerous duplicate claims were rejected.

On June 12, 2009, a lawsuit was filed against SIPC's Bankruptcy Trustee, Irving Picard by Maureen Ebel, Roger and Diane Peskin claiming his breach of fiduciary duty for failing to follow rules to make payments to Madoff victims. Picard demanded the Peskins pay back $113,000 they withdrew from Madoff in the 90 days before the firm closed. They also invested more than $470,000 in the same period, a net loss of $357,000. Ebel claims she is owed for two accounts that held her life savings.

==== Hardship program ====
The Hardship Program is designed to give eligible people up to $500,000, the insurance limit of the Securities Investor Protection Corp. who are unable to pay living and medical expenses, filing for personal bankruptcy, and ages 65+ who have been forced to leave retirement and return to work. The claim will be decided within 20 days after qualifying is determined. The filing deadline was July 2, 2009.

== Taxes ==
On March 17, 2009, the IRS issued new rules for Madoff investors who claim theft losses. Revenue Ruling 2009–9, sets forth general rules for claiming theft losses from Ponzi schemes, and Revenue Procedure 2009–20, includes safe harbor elections for investors in such schemes.

Under the rules, investors who do not sue Madoff or other parties will be allowed a theft-loss deduction for the 2008 tax year, equal to 95 percent of their total investment, including all fictitious earnings credited to their accounts on which they were taxed, but less any withdrawals, or actual or potential recoveries from SIPC or their own insurance. Victims who decide to sue Madoff or third parties, believing they might have the possibility of some recovery, may still deduct 75 percent of their investment. The deduction will not be subject to the limitations on deduction of itemized deductions. Any loss exceeding current income may result in a net operating loss, which can be carried back, at the taxpayer's election, 3, 4, or 5 years, with any loss still remaining carrying forward 20 years. These rules apply to all Ponzi schemes where there has been a federal or state indictment of the lead promoter.

Alternatively, victims may choose to file a refund claim for the full amount of their investment, including fictitious earnings on which they previously were taxed, but such claims will be subject to the standard rules for theft losses. Victims can also file refund claims based on excluding from income fictitious earnings which they previously reported, but such claims must be filed when the prior returns are still open for refund, generally three years from filing.

== Civil proceedings ==
On February 9, 2009, a partial judgment in the December 11, 2008, civil suit by the U.S. Securities and Exchange Commission, case SEC v. Madoff, 08-10791 in U.S. District Court, Southern District of New York (Manhattan) was made permanent. As part of the judgment, Madoff was banned from the securities industry. He also agreed that his assets would remain frozen and not violate any securities laws. The agreement did not require Madoff to admit or deny any allegations against him. It also left the issues of any civil fines and repayments to be imposed against Madoff for a later time. The agreement was unrelated to any plea or indictment in the criminal matter.

About 120 Madoff-related class actions have been filed – mainly suits on behalf of investors who indirectly invested when they entrusted their money to funds-of-funds like Fairfield Greenwich Group, (Case No: 09-118) in U.S. District Court for the Southern District of New York (Manhattan) Kingate Management, Tremont Group, and J. Ezra Merkin's Ascot, Gabriel and Ariel Partners. The contingency fee to the attorney is usually 25% or more of the recovery.

=== Clawback defense and investor representation ===
The trustee's aggressive clawback campaign prompted hundreds of so-called "net winners" — investors who had withdrawn more than they deposited — to retain legal counsel to defend against the recovery actions. The scale of the litigation required representation across multiple jurisdictions and involved a wide range of firms. Schulte Roth & Zabel represented the estate of Jeffry Picower in negotiations that ultimately resulted in a $7.2 billion settlement, the largest single forfeiture recovery in U.S. history. Attorney Helen Davis Chaitman of Becker & Poliakoff represented approximately 500 individual Madoff victims in claims proceedings. Other firms defending investors and institutions against the trustee's recovery actions included Proskauer Rose, Quinn Emanuel, Cleary Gottlieb, and South Florida practitioners such as Mark S. Roher, who handled claims on behalf of affected investors in the Southern District of Florida.

=== JPMorgan Chase Bank ===
Madoff opened a business account at what was then Chemical Bank in 1986. Chemical bought Chase Manhattan in 1996, and the merged bank took the better-known Chase name. Chase merged with JPMorgan to form JPMorgan Chase in 2000, and Madoff retained his account there until his 2008 arrest.

On April 23, 2009, JPMorgan Chase was served with a complaint from MLSMK Investment Company, a Palm Beach, Florida partnership that directly deposited $12.8 million into Madoff's account between October and early December 2008. The lawsuit alleges the bank of aiding Madoff's crime by maintaining his checking accounts and trading with his brokerage firm long after the bank realized that he was running a vast fraud. In September 2008, Morgan Chase began withdrawing $250 million of its own money from the Sentry funds operated by the Fairfield Greenwich Group, a Madoff feeder fund. If the bank had terminated Madoff's accounts then, the plaintiffs would not have lost their money.

On October 20, 2009, an amended complaint to an investor lawsuit in New York State Supreme Court added accounting firm KPMG, JPMorgan Chase and Bank of New York Mellon Also named was Oppenheimer Acquisition Corp, Massachusetts Mutual Life Insurance (MMLIC.UL), Tremont Group funds founder Sandra Manzke and former Tremont Chief Executive, Robert Schulman. The amendments were based on the Plaintiffs' attorneys' prison interview with Madoff in July 2009 and an investigation. "The complaint alleges Bernard Madoff's fraud was not accomplished in isolation," the law firm's statement said. "The sheer size and scope of the fraud make it impossible for Madoff to have acted alone. The complaint alleges JP Morgan and the Bank of New York as well as powerhouse accounting firm KPMG and their international counterparts, KPMG UK and KPMG International were primary players necessary to accomplish the fraud."

On December 2, 2010, Picard sued JPMorgan Chase, seeking damages and restitution of at least $6.4 billion. The suit was initially sealed due to confidentiality concerns on Chase's part, but both parties agreed to unseal it on February 3, 2011. The suit alleges that Chase knew or should have known that Madoff's wealth management business was a fraud. However, Chase didn't report its concerns to regulators or law enforcement until October 2008, when it told the UK Serious Organised Crime Agency that the performance of Madoff's investments was "too good to be true." The suit also claimed that Chase bankers were making profitable deals with Madoff even as risk management executives expressed concern about the nature of Madoff's business. It also claimed that Chase officials knew that Friehling & Horowitz wasn't peer reviewed or registered with the Public Company Accounting Oversight Board (it subsequently emerged that the Friehling firm had stated in writing for more than a decade that it didn't conduct audits). Almost as seriously, Picard charged that Chemical/Chase's retail bankers failed to perform even basic oversight of Madoff's banking activities, despite several transactions dating as far back as the 1990s that raised the appearance of money laundering or check kiting. Picard argued that even a cursory glance at Madoff's account activity at Chase would have revealed his business could not possibly have been legitimate. He also argued that even after Chase reported its concerns about Madoff's performance to UK officials, it didn't put any restrictions on Madoff's banking activities until his arrest two months later.

== Luxembourg settlement with UBS ==
Luxembourg Treasury Minister Luc Frieden is negotiating a settlement with custodial Swiss Bank, UBS. Luxalpha, a Luxembourg-based fund created at their request by the bank was holding about $1.4 billion of assets. UBS has denied recommending to clients any Madoff products, stating that clients knew what they were investing in. Financial regulator CSSF has given the bank three months to reform its practices.

About 70 investors whose money was put into Access International Advisors LLC's LuxAlpha Sicav-American Selection are suing UBS, the fund's custodian bank, Ernst & Young, its auditor, and directors of the fund. René-Thierry Magon de la Villehuchet, chief executive officer of Access International, which managed LuxAlpha, was found dead in his New York office after losing all of the money he had invested with Madoff. (See:Madoff Investment Scandal#Impact and aftermath)

== JPMorgan Chase deferred prosecution agreement ==
In the fall of 2013, JPMorgan began talks with prosecutors and regulators to settle charges alleging that it turned a blind eye to Madoff's actions. On January 7, 2014, JPMorgan agreed to pay a total of $2.05 billion in fines and penalties to settle civil and criminal charges related to its role in the Madoff scandal. The bank signed a deferred prosecution agreement—the first ever imposed on a major New York City bank—with United States Attorney for the Southern District of New York Preet Bharara. In the agreement, JPMorgan admitted that it and its predecessors failed to report illegal activities on Madoff's part as required by the Bank Secrecy Act as early as 1994. Bharara filed a two-count criminal information charging JPMorgan with Bank Secrecy Act violations, but the charges will be dismissed within two years provided that JPMorgan reforms its anti-money laundering procedures and cooperates with the government in its investigation. The bank agreed to forfeit $1.7 billion—the largest forfeiture ever imposed in American financial history. The government will use this money to help make Madoff's victims whole. JPMorgan also agreed to pay a $350 million fine to the Office of the Comptroller of the Currency.

== See also ==
- List of investors in Bernard L. Madoff Securities
