= Participants in the Madoff investment scandal =

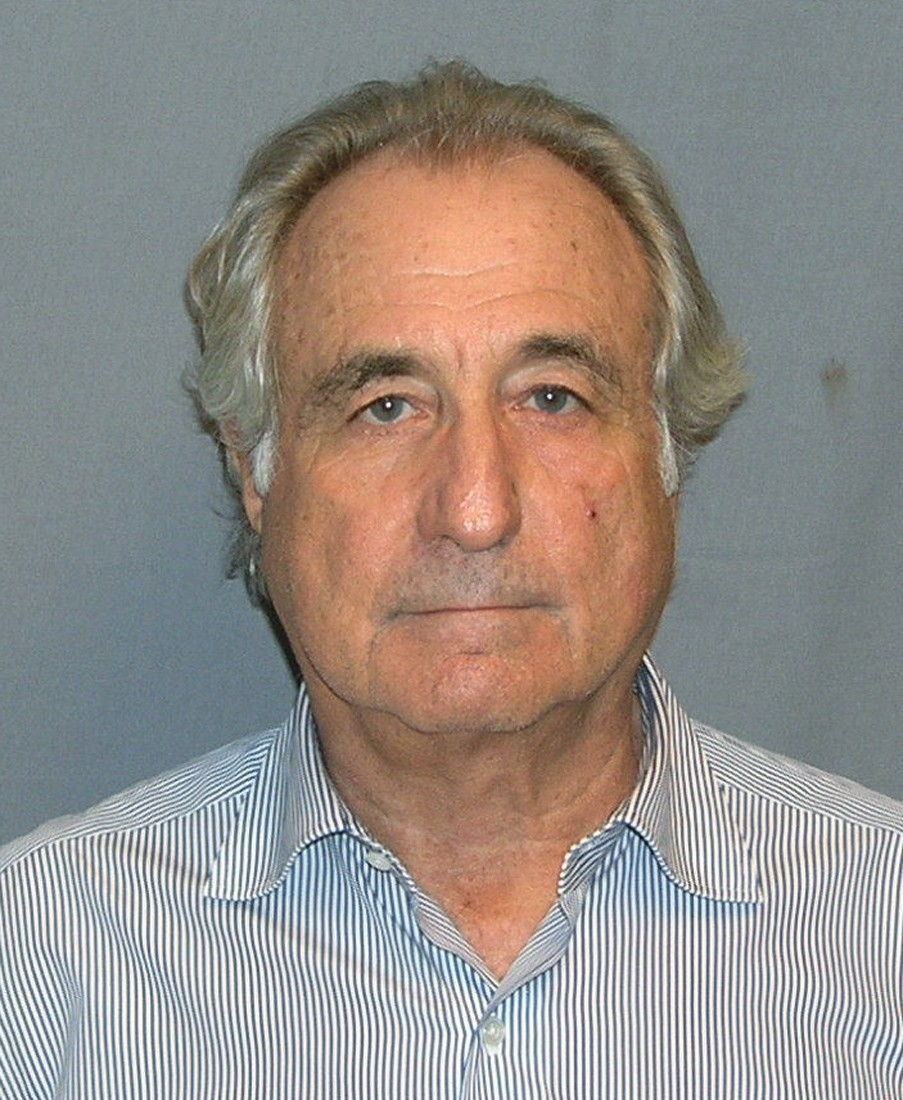
Bernie Madoff

Participants in the Madoff investment scandal included employees of Bernard Madoff's investment firm with specific knowledge of the Ponzi scheme, a three-person accounting firm that assembled his reports, and a network of feeder funds that invested their clients' money with Madoff while collecting significant fees. Madoff avoided most direct financial scrutiny by accepting investments only through these feeder funds, while obtaining false auditing statements for his firm. The liquidation trustee of Madoff's firm has implicated managers of the feeder funds for ignoring signs of Madoff's deception.

Although Madoff claimed to have executed the scheme alone, subsequent investigation has shown that he was assisted by a small group of close associates, as well as the feeders' self-interested indifference to the source of his investment returns.

== Madoff Securities International Ltd. ==
In 2008, about $1 billion was transferred between Madoff's U.S. firm and Madoff Securities International Ltd. in London.

On March 24, 2009, Judge Louis L. Stanton granted power of attorney to Irving Picard, trustee, over Madoff's controlling stake in London.

Authorities in the U.K. are seeking evidence of money laundering involving the London business, Madoff Securities International Ltd., which opened in 1983 as a separate legal entity from Mr. Madoff's U.S. New York office. He allegedly sent more than $250 million beginning as early as 2002, from his New York-based firm, Bernard L. Madoff Investment Securities LLC, to the U.K. office and then back to accounts in the U.S.

In 2000, Madoff began to add staff and expand the operation, and loaned the business $62.5 million. He had a staff of 25, including traders, managers and support. Instructions to staff was that they communicate with Madoff Securities through personal e-mail accounts, not through company e-mail.

There were nine directors. Family members with shares included Mark and Andrew Madoff, Peter Madoff, and Bernard himself. Ruth Madoff, Bernard Madoff's wife, also held shares. Non-family members with shares included Maurice J. "Sonny" Cohn. Madoff and Cohn were shareholders in Cohmad Securities, which steered investors to Mr. Madoff's advisory business. In 1987, Mr. Cohn had shares of Madoff Holdings Ltd., a predecessor to the current London firm. In 1998, Mr. Cohn held 35,624 non-voting shares, some of which he transferred to "BL Madoff" in 1998, and the rest that he "disposed of" in 2004.

=== Paul Konigsberg ===
Paul Konigsberg, a New York City accountant and a longtime friend for more than 25 years, prepared two Madoff Family Foundation tax returns, and received the non-voting shares, valued at $35,000. He did work for the London office when it was first opened. A general ledger of Madoff accounts listed Konigsberg, of the reputable accounting firm of Konigsberg, Wolf & Co., as receiving $30,000 a month to advise the MSIL operations, and funnel client checks to the London office for Madoff's own use.

Clients were often directed to Mr. Konigsberg by Mr. Madoff and his family. Mr. Konigsberg prepared the tax returns of foundations of six other families, many of which have lost millions, even hundreds of millions, of dollars. He also represented scores of individual Madoff investors. Mr. Konigsberg's firm has received a civil subpoena from the SEC. His Madoff-related clients included Carl and Ruth Shapiro, Boston philanthropists whose foundation lost $145 million, and whose son-in-law, Robert M. Jaffe, under investigation, is a Madoff business partner.

Konigsberg held Madoff accounts under his name including two in the name of the Westlake Foundation. Paul J. and Judith Konigsberg are officers and directors of the foundation. He owns homes in his wife, Judith's name in Greenwich, Connecticut and Palm Beach Gardens, Florida.

On April 20, 2009, Steven Leber filed a $4 million lawsuit against Konigsberg and his accounting firm for negligence, and breach of fiduciary duty. Konigsberg answered the charges with affirmative defenses.

In June 2014, Konigsberg pleaded guilty in connection to the Madoff case and would consequently face up to 30 years in prison. On July 9, 2015, U.S. District Court Judge Laura Taylor Swain agreed with prosecutors that Konigsberg did not know about Madoff's scheme and had cooperated fully with investigators. Swain ruled that Konigsberg had earned lenience from federal sentencing guidelines and did not have to serve any time in prison.

=== Norman F. Levy ===
Evidence is being gathered by investigators on a U.S.-U.K. task force that Konigsberg and Levy, a real-estate mogul and philanthropist are believed to be involved in an international transfer of money. Levy is believed to have helped Paul Konigsberg funnel checks to London. And investigators in New York say there were billions of dollars' worth of checks going back and forth between Madoff and Levy.

Ruth and Bernie Madoff had an intimate relationship with Levy and his wife, Betty. Madoff was long known to have been Levy's "fixer", obtaining everything from choice restaurant reservations to emergency medical care. Levy had offices one floor below Madoff's in New York's Lipstick Building. It was Levy who introduced high-profile investors to Madoff.

Jeanne Levy-Church's losses forced her to shut her JEHT Foundation and her parents' foundation, the Betty and Norman F. Levy Foundation, lost $244 million. JEHT helped the less fortunate, especially ex-convicts.

Following the death of his wife, Levy's girlfriend, model Carmen Dell'Orefice, an investor, said Levy was Madoff's "father figure". When Levy died in 2005 at the age of 93, Madoff extolled him as a man whose friendship he had cherished and who had "taught me so much." Levy's son Francis said his father believed in Madoff: "If there's one honorable person," he said, "it's Bernie."

=== Chapter 15 bankruptcy protection ===
On April 14, 2009, the liquidators of Madoff International Limited of London filed for Chapter 15 bankruptcy recognition in West Palm Beach, Florida, and sued Peter Madoff, to recover a 1964 Aston Martin DB2/4 automobile worth an estimated $200,000. In March and May 2008, Madoff International wire-transferred 135,000 pounds ($198,207) to buy a car for Peter Madoff, and delivered it to him at his residence in Palm Beach. Madoff International's listed assets are as much as $500 million and debt of more than $1 billion in its bankruptcy petition. The bankruptcy is designed to block U.S. lawsuits against foreign companies with U.S. operations while they reorganize overseas. Investors who filed an involuntary personal bankruptcy petition against Madoff want his business's U.K. unit's bankruptcy moved to New York because "overlapping discovery, related assets and common creditors" among the various cases mean they should be in the same court.

The Chapter 15 case is In re Madoff Securities International Ltd., 09-16751, U.S. Bankruptcy Court, Southern District of Florida (West Palm Beach).

On June 8, 2009, the Chapter 15 case was transferred to the Southern District of New York as Madoff Securities International Limited, Stephen John Akers, Mark Richard Byers, and Andrew Laurence as the Joint Provisional Liquidators, 09-12998, so it can be administered more effectively with the related involuntary bankruptcies against Madoff, and his companies, also filed in New York. The associated adversary proceeding was also moved to the Southern District of New York as Akers et al. v. Madoff, 09-1186, demanding $235,000 against Peter B. Madoff.

== David G. Friehling ==
Since at least 1991, Bernard L. Madoff Investment Securities had been audited by Friehling & Horowitz CPAs, a little-known accounting firm in New City, north of New York City. The firm consisted of two principals, David G. Friehling and Jerome Horowitz, and a part-time secretary. Horowitz was semi-retired; Friehling was the sole active practitioner.

Well before the Madoff scandal broke, several observers doubted that a tiny firm with only one active accountant could competently audit a firm that had grown into a multibillion-dollar operation. In 2007, Aksia, a hedge fund consultant, warned its clients to stay away from Madoff for that very reason; its CEO, Jim Vos, likened this situation to General Motors being audited by a three-person firm. Others were suspicious that Madoff refused requests for due diligence because his accountant—supposedly his brother-in-law—was the only one allowed to see the books. Indeed, for many years, Friehling's practice was so small that he operated out of his house. He only got an office when Madoff told him that some investors were asking questions about the audits. Even then, his operation remained very small; in 2008 it only garnered $180,000 in earnings, far less than conventional wisdom would suggest for a firm that was supposedly earning substantial fees from auditing the Madoff operation. It later emerged that officials at Fairfield Greenwich Group, operator of the largest Madoff feeder fund, had been aware as early as 2005 that Friehling was the firm's sole employee.

Friehling was charged on March 18, 2009, with securities fraud, aiding and abetting investment adviser fraud, and four counts of filing false audit reports with the Securities and Exchange Commission. Friehling waived indictment and pleaded not guilty to criminal charges on July 10, 2009. He agreed to proceed without having the evidence in the criminal case against him reviewed by a grand jury at a hearing before U.S. District Judge Alvin Hellerstein in Manhattan. He faced up to 105 years in prison on all of the charges. Federal prosecutors had until about June 17, 2009, to produce a grand jury indictment against him, or a plea bargain to end the case.

Madoff's firm paid Friehling between $12,000 and $14,500 a month for his services between 2004 and 2007.

Although required, Friehling was not registered with the Public Company Accounting Oversight Board, which was created under the Sarbanes-Oxley Act of 2002 to help detect fraud. Nor was the firm "peer reviewed", in which auditors check out one another for quality control. According to the American Institute of Certified Public Accountants (AICPA), Friehling was enrolled in their peer-review program, but was not required to participate because he advised the group that he had not conducted audits for 15 years. It later emerged that Madoff's banker, JPMorgan Chase, had known that Friehling wasn't registered with the PCAOB or subject to peer review as early as 2006.

Friehling pleaded guilty in November 2009. He admitted to simply rubber-stamping Madoff's filings with the SEC; rather than perform actual audits, he signed blank SEC forms before Madoff and others filled them in. He also revealed that he continued to audit Madoff even though he had invested a substantial amount of money with him; accountants aren't allowed to audit broker-dealers with whom they're investing. He agreed to forfeit $3.18 million in accounting fees and withdrawals from his account with Madoff, as well as his three-story, 4,400-square-foot house in New City and one other property. Friehling faced a maximum sentence of 114 years in prison, but unlike Madoff has agreed to cooperate with the government. Calling himself a victim of Madoff, he faced a possible sentence of 20 years.

In May 2015, U.S. District Judge Laura Taylor Swain sentenced Friehling to one year of home detention and one year of supervised release. Friehling avoided prison because he cooperated extensively with federal prosecutors and because he had been unaware of the extent of Madoff's crimes. Addressing the court at the hearing, Friehling apologized to Madoff's victims. Referring to Madoff's reported statement that he was a "dumb auditor", Friehling said: "I would rather be regarded as dumb than crooked. I did not question what I should have questioned."

Swain accepted the plea terms, but suggested that Friehling be forced to pay part of the overall $130 million forfeiture arising from the fraud. Swain said that she did not believe Friehling's nonfeasance took place "in a vacuum," and felt the forfeiture was necessary to hold the defendants to account even though it will likely never be repaid in full.

Friehling's involvement made the Madoff scandal the largest accounting fraud in history, dwarfing the $11 billion fraud orchestrated by Bernard Ebbers at WorldCom.

== Peter B. Madoff ==
Peter B. Madoff, chief compliance officer, worked with his brother Bernie for more than 40 years, and ran the daily operations for over 20 years. Peter Madoff helped create the computerized trading system used by the firm and his daughter, Shana Madoff Swanson, worked for him at the firm as a rules and compliance officer and attorney. In 2007 she married Eric Swanson, whom she had met as he was conducting an SEC review of the firm in 2003 as an SEC assistant director.

Peter graduated from Fordham University School of Law in 1970 and was formerly director of the National Stock Exchange (Cincinnati Stock Exchange). Peter owned a home in Old Westbury, New York, valued between $3–5 million, and a $4.2 million home in Palm Beach, Florida, the title of which was transferred on November 8, 2006, to his wife, Marion, and a vintage Aston Martin.

Peter stepped down from the board of directors of the Securities Industry and Financial Markets Association (SIFMA) in December 2008, as news of the Ponzi scheme broke. Peter also co-signed Bernie's bail bond. According to court documents, Peter did not agree to cooperate in the investigation.

Peter also owns between 5 percent and 10 percent of, and is a director of, Cohmad Securities Corp. He has been subpoenaed by Massachusetts's Secretary of State William F. Galvin.

On April 3, 2009, his temporarily frozen assets previously ordered were modified to be allowed to spend up to $10,000 per month for living expenses, including mortgage loans and insurance premiums.

Peter served as a trustee for law student Andrew Samuels' $470,000 inheritance from his grandfather who worked for Madoff and created a trust for him. Andrew's lawsuit, claiming $2 million for breach of fiduciary duty (by investing his inheritance with Bernard Madoff), was settled in July 2009. The case is Ross v. Madoff, 09-5534, New York Supreme Court for Nassau County (Mineola).

On April 13, 2009, Judge Arthur Hiller in Bridgeport, Connecticut, dissolved the temporary order he imposed March 30 freezing his assets. Madoff agreed to attachments of $2.5 million to his Long Island home. His attorney is H. James Pickerstein. The pension fund case is Retirement Program for Employees of the Town of Fairfield v. Madoff, FBT-CV-09-5023735-S, Superior Court of Connecticut (Bridgeport)

On April 30, 2009, Peter demanded a $500,000 licensing fee as part of the sale of BLMIS for intellectual property used by the market-making business, but it was rejected by the bankruptcy trustee who maintains that the patents are the property of the business. Members of the Madoff family, including Madoff, own holding companies that own Primex LLC, which holds intellectual property licensed to the Nasdaq stock market. The patents are used for electronic trading.

Senator Frank Lautenberg's family foundation, which invested more than $7 million, also filed a lawsuit against Peter Madoff.

On June 29, 2012, Peter pleaded guilty in federal court to a variety of charges and agreed to a 10-year prison term. Peter Madoff sometimes signed many weeks of compliance reports in one sitting, intentionally changing pens and ink colors to make it appear he had signed them at various times, according to prosecutors. Peter Madoff admitted to hiding millions of dollars from the IRS to avoid taxes, and took $200,000 from the firm for charitable donations, even after the fraud was exposed.

A forfeiture order requires Peter to surrender all of his assets to the government, including cash, homes, cars and a Rolex watch. A settlement reached with his family requires the forfeiture of assets held by his wife, Marion, his daughter, Shana Madoff Swanson, and other family members.

On December 20, 2012, he was sentenced to 10 years in prison for his involvement in the Ponzi scheme. He was previously serving his sentence at FCI-Miami, and then was in the custody of RRM Miami which is the Residential Reentry Management (RRM) Miami field office, a so-called "halfway house". His Federal Bureau of Prisons inmate number was 67118-054. He was released from prison on August 13, 2020.

His current whereabouts are unknown.

== Ruth Madoff ==
Ruth Madoff withdrew $5.5 million on November 25, 2008, and $10 million on December 10, 2008, from her brokerage account at Cohmad, a feeder fund which had an office in Madoff's headquarters and was part-owned by him. In November, she also received $2 million from her husband's London office, Madoff Securities International Ltd.

On January 30, 2009, a CBS News investigation discovered that the Madoffs were moving assets during the 2006 SEC investigation. Madoff had purchased their $9.5 million Palm Beach mansion in March 1994 in his wife's name. Not until December 10, 2006, did she apply for "homestead" status, shielding their home from creditors. Her initial application was rejected because there was no proof it was her primary residence, which protects homeowners who have obtained the exemption from seizure. On September 18, 2008, she reapplied for Homestead Exemption, and it was granted on January 12, 2009, after Madoff's arrest.

On April 13, 2009, Judge Arthur Hiller in Bridgeport, Connecticut, dissolved the temporary order he imposed March 30 freezing her assets, because they were already frozen by the federal government. The pension fund case was Retirement Program for Employees of the Town of Fairfield v. Madoff, FBT-CV-09-5023735-S, Superior Court of Connecticut (Bridgeport)

She did not attend her husband's sentencing. As part of her husband's sentencing terms, she agreed to give up all of her possessions in return for a promise that federal prosecutors would not go after the $2.5 million she can keep from the federal prosecutors. The money was not protected from civil legal actions pursued by a court-appointed trustee liquidating Madoff's assets or by investor lawsuits, however.

On July 29, 2009, she was sued by trustee Irving Picard for $45 million, which supported her "life of splendor." According to court filings, she received more than $3 million from the business over the prior six years to pay personal expenses charged to her American Express card, and $2 million in payments to a business called PetCare RX. "Ruth Madoff was never an employee of BLMIS yet millions of dollars belonging to BLMIS and its customers found their way into her personal accounts and investments without any legitimate business purpose or any value to BLMIS, simply because of her relationship with Bernard Madoff." She was also required to itemize all expenditures over $100. The case is Picard v. Madoff, 1:09-ap-1391, U.S. Bankruptcy Court, Southern District of New York (Manhattan).

She has been named in several civil actions. She is represented by attorney Peter Chavkin and David Barres.

Ruth has not been charged with any crime, and has not been questioned by prosecutors. She has been seen riding the New York City Subway and apparently did not attend her husband's June 29, 2009, sentencing hearing.

Ruth Madoff's combined assets with her husband had a net worth of between $823 million and $826 million. She had $92.6 million in assets listed in her own name: the $7 million Upper East Side penthouse; an $11 million mansion in Palm Beach, Fla.; Antibes and France totaling $19 million; $45 million in municipal bonds and $17 million in cash; $8.8 million worth of yachts; and $2.6 million worth of jewelry. The SEC worked with federal prosecutors, who filed a notice with the federal court to seek forfeiture of all listed ill-gotten assets.

On March 2, 2009, U.S. District Judge Louis Stanton, presiding over the SEC case, filed an order modifying the property asset freeze. Ruth Madoff's lawyers asserted that "Only Ruth Madoff has a beneficial ownership" to a Manhattan apartment; about $45 million in municipal bonds deposited at Cohmad Securities Corp., and approximately $17 million in cash in another account, at Wachovia Bank NA. Ruth Madoff says these assets are "unrelated" to the alleged fraud, Stanton wrote without ruling on her claim.

In June 2009, shortly before Bernie Madoff was sentenced, prosecutors reached an agreement allowing Ruth Madoff to keep $2.5 million, while taking and selling the Madoffs' other assets. The settlement, however, did not preclude others, such as the court-appointed trustee Irving Picard of BakerHostetler who was liquidating her husband's firm, from seeking to recover funds from her, for example as a wrongful transferee of funds transferred to her. Bernie Madoff's lawyer had asked the government to allow his wife to keep $70 million in assets that were in her name, as he forfeited all rights to assets totaling $170 million.

In May 2019, 77-year-old Ruth Madoff agreed to pay $594,000 ($250,000 in cash, and $344,000 of trusts for two of her grandchildren), and to surrender her remaining assets when she dies, to settle claims by the court-appointed trustee Picard liquidating her husband's firm for former customers. Picard had sued Ruth Madoff for $44.8 million, saying she had lived a "life of splendor" on the gains from the fraud committed by her husband, but settled for less, given her limited assets. Picard said that the settlement was not evidence she knew of or participated in the fraud. She is required to provide reports to Picard about her expenditures often, as to any purchase over $100, to ensure she does not have any hidden bank accounts.

== Fred Wilpon ==
Sterling Equities, a group of companies owned by Fred Wilpon, was sued in December 2010, for $1 billion by trustee Picard. Wilpon at the time owned the New York Mets baseball team, a sports cable network and extensive real estate holdings. Picard charged that "red flags" were ignored, and there was no due diligence. He claimed that the Mets owners "were simply in too deep – having substantially supported their businesses with Madoff money – to do anything but ignore the gathering clouds." On February 10, 2011, former New York Governor Mario Cuomo was appointed as a mediator in the dispute between the trustee and Sterling. On March 19, 2012, Wilpon and Picard agreed to settle the lawsuit for $162 million.

== Saul Katz ==
Saul Katz, alongside Fred Wilpon, and other Sterling partners, was sued by the Madoff trustee Irving Picard. Picard wrote of Katz: "There are thousands of victims of Madoff's massive Ponzi scheme. But Saul Katz is not one of them." Katz settled the accusations of willfully ignoring the Madoff fraud for $162 million thereby avoiding a federal trial.

== Greg Katz ==
Gregory Katz, a Sterling Equities Partner alongside Fred Wilpon and Saul Katz, was sued by the Madoff trustee Irving Picard. Greg Katz was said to be intimately involved in Sterling's investments with Bernard L. Madoff. Katz opened his first Madoff account in January 1992 and had interest in 31 accounts at the time the ponzi scheme was exposed to the public. Greg Katz was shown to have received approximately $23,527,313 in "Fictitious Profits" from individual or Sterling-controlled accounts. Referring to Katz and other Sterling partners, Picard wrote: "There are thousands of victims of Madoff's massive Ponzi scheme. But Saul Katz is not one of them. Neither is Fred Wilpon. And neither are the rest of the partners at Sterling Equities who, along with Fred Wilpon and Saul Katz, are sophisticated investors who oversee and control Sterling and its many businesses and investments." Picard also wrote that Sterling Partners such as Katz among the "largest beneficiaries of Madoff's fraud." Gregory Katz entered into a settlement agreement with the Madoff trustee Irving Picard in April 2012.

== Mark and Andrew Madoff ==
Madoff's sons, Mark and Andrew, worked in the trading arm in the New York office, but also raised money marketing the Madoff funds. Their assets were frozen on March 31, 2009. Madoff has contended that his sons were not involved in the fraud, a claim backed up by his longtime secretary, Eleanor Squillari; she believes that if the sons were involved in the fraud, she would have known about it. However, there is some skepticism about claims that Mark and Andrew were not in on the fraud.

The two had been estranged from their father since December 10, 2008, when he revealed that he was running a Ponzi scheme. They had not spoken with their mother either, only communicating with her through lawyers.

In 1998, the sons became directors of the London office, Madoff Securities International Ltd., and took stakes in the business. They were given loans by the New York office to buy their shares. Interest on the loans was paid by dividends made by the London operation. Andrew had several million dollars invested with his father at the time the fraud was revealed. At the time of Mark's divorce, in 2000, his interest in the London office was valued at $5 million. Other family members with shares in the London business were Bernard's wife, Ruth, and brother, Peter.

The New York business paid Mark $770,000 in 1999 and rewarded him with a deferred-compensation plan valued at $5 million, but he withdrew his personal funds he had invested with his father's investment-advisory operation some time before his divorce. He remarried Stephanie in 2003 in Nantucket.

Prosecutors intend to seize promissory notes given to the Madoffs by Andrew and Mark from 2001 to October 2008. Mark Madoff owed his parents $22 million, and Andrew Madoff owed $9.5 million. There were two loans in 2008 from Bernard Madoff to Andrew Madoff: $4.3 million on Oct 6, and $250,000 on Sept. 21.

On April 13, 2009, Judge Arthur Hiller in Bridgeport, Connecticut, dissolved the temporary order he imposed March 30 freezing their assets. They agreed to attachments of $2.5 million each to their Greenwich homes. The pension fund case is Retirement Program for Employees of the Town of Fairfield v. Madoff, FBT-CV-09-5023735-S, Superior Court of Connecticut (Bridgeport).

On June 16, 2009, former employees Richard Stahl and Reed Abend filed separate lawsuits against Madoff's sons claiming nearly $2 million in deferred compensation. Stahl, a former vice president at Cantor Fitzgerald, claims $1.34 million for 2008, when he earned more than $5 million for Madoff Securities. Abend wants $473,940.

On October 2, 2009, a civil lawsuit was filed against them by trustee Picard for a judgment in the aggregate amount of at least $198,743,299. Peter Madoff and daughter Shana are also defendants.

On March 15, 2010, the defendants filed a motion to dismiss, citing they were also victims, saying the lawsuit is "predicated on the faulty assumption" that the sons exercised a compliance function over the investment advisory business.

On December 11, 2010, on the second anniversary of his father's arrest, Mark Madoff was found dead in his New York City apartment from an apparent suicide. It was later ruled suicide by hanging by a New York City medical examiner.

On October 18, 2013, a UK court dismissed a $40 million case against the directors of Madoff's British unit. The directors included the deceased Mark Madoff and the critically ill Andrew Madoff, being treated for mantle cell lymphoma in Seattle at the time of the verdict.

On September 3, 2014, Andrew Madoff died of mantle cell lymphoma at Memorial Sloan Kettering Cancer Center in New York City. He was 48.

== Jeffry Picower ==
Jeffry Picower was an industrialist and philanthropist who seemed to be a favored Madoff beneficiary, and made outlandish profits from his investments with Madoff. From 1996 to 2007 there were 14 instances of greater than 100% yearly returns, and 25 of greater than 50%. From 1996 to 1999 his regular trading account made from 120–550% a year. Some evidence of backdating trades, instituted by Picower, was presented by trustee Irving Picard.

In June 2009, Irving Picard, the trustee liquidating Madoff's assets, filed a lawsuit against Picower in the U.S. Bankruptcy Court for the Southern District of New York (Manhattan), seeking the return of $7.2 billion in profits, alleging that Picower and his wife Barbara knew or should have known that their rates of return were "implausibly high", with some accounts showing annual returns ranging from 120% to more than 550% from 1996 through 1998, and 950% in 1999. According to a June 28, 2009, MSNBC article, that would make Picower and his wife the biggest beneficiaries of Madoff's scam, exceeding even Madoff himself. The Picowers' lawyer, William D. Zabel of Schulte Roth & Zabel, responded that, "They were totally shocked by his fraud and were in no way complicit in it."

On December 17, 2010, it was announced that a settlement of $7.2 billion had been reached between Irving Picard and Barbara Picower, Picower's widow, the executor of the Picower estate to resolve the Madoff trustee suit, and repay losses in the Madoff fraud. It was the largest single forfeiture in American judicial history. "Barbara Picower has done the right thing," US Attorney Preet Bharara said.

== Frank DiPascali ==
Frank DiPascali, who referred to himself as "director of options trading" and as "chief financial officer" at Madoff Securities, pleaded guilty on August 11, 2009, to 10 counts: conspiracy, securities fraud, investment advisor fraud, mail fraud, wire fraud, perjury, income tax evasion, international money laundering, falsifying books and records of a broker-dealer and an investment advisor. In his allocution to the Court, he admitted that he had known for at least two decades that Madoff was a fraud; he claimed to have learned in the late 1980s or early 1990s that no actual trading was occurring in Madoff's investment-advisory client accounts. About 2002, he set up an account for himself at the firm named after his fishing yacht, Dorothy Jo. Having never made a contribution, he withdrew more than $5 million. His salary and bonuses were over $2 million annually. He agreed in a plea agreement and the signed Information document to connect the dots and to name names, with sentencing originally anticipated in May 2010. He faced a maximum of 125 years in prison. Prosecutors sought more than $170 million in forfeiture, the same amount sought from Madoff, which represents about double the funds deposited by investors and later disbursed to other investors. The same day, a U.S. Securities and Exchange Commission civil complaint was filed against DiPascali.

A college dropout, he joined Madoff's firm in 1975 at age 18 and eventually oversaw the day-to-day operations of Madoff's investment-advisory business. He was the person many of Madoff's investors dealt with regarding their accounts. Madoff told investors DiPascali executed trades. However, a court-appointed trustee found that no trading had occurred for at least 13 years. Prosecutors asked at least three employees, Eric Lipkin, JoAnn Crupi, and Robert Cardile, who is Mr. DiPascali's brother-in-law, about his role in the firm. Investors spoke to these other employees and would fax orders if they needed to withdraw money. DiPascali's name was sometimes given as an alternate contact. According to an SEC memo, DiPascali "responded evasively" to questioning following Madoff's arrest.

In December 2013, at a court hearing, he gave detailed information how Madoff was meticulous in the management of the fraud.

On May 7, 2015, while still awaiting sentencing, DiPascali died of lung cancer at age 58.

== Enrica Cotellessa-Pitz ==
Enrica Cotellessa-Pitz was a controller at Bernard L. Madoff Investment Securities LLC, but not a licensed certified public accountant. Her signature is on checks from BMIS to Cohmad Securities Corp. representing commission payments. She was the liaison between the SEC and BLMIS regarding the firm's financial statements. The SEC has removed the BMIS statements from its website. On May 19, 2015, while facing the possibility of a 50-year prison sentence, she avoided prison and instead received probation, with Judge Laura Swain citing her "extensive" cooperation with the prosecution.

== Madoff backroom staff ==
In 2010 five backroom employees pleaded not guilty to charges including conspiracy to commit securities fraud. On October 2, 2012, they maintained their innocence to further charges including bank fraud and tax offenses. Their trial (USA v O'Hara et al. in U.S. District Court for the Southern District of New York, No. 10-0228) opened on October 7, 2013.

=== Annette Bongiorno ===
Annette Bongiorno was a long-time personal secretary and aide to Madoff. Bongiorno joined Madoff Investment Securities in 1967, soon after graduating high school; only Madoff's wife Ruth and brother Peter were at the firm longer. She recruited Frank DiPascali, then her next-door neighbor in Howard Beach, to the firm.

She is accused of directing two assistants, Semone Anderson and Winnie Jackson, to generate fictitious trading tickets for customer accounts. During the 1980s, Bongiorno recruited small investors from Howard Beach. Their money was held in accounts called "RuAnn" (named after Annette and her husband Rudy). Madoff paid for her honeymoon airfare. She owns homes in Manhasset, New York, and Boca Raton, Florida, with a combined assessment of $3.85 million. Bongiorno was arrested in November 2010 and charged with conspiracy, securities fraud, and tax evasion. She faced up to 75 years in jail. After a brief incarceration in late 2010 and after $7.6 million were seized from Bongiornos' accounts (out of an estimated $14 million personal take), Bongiorno was released to house arrest with ankle monitor at her Manhasset, Long Island, residence on a $3.6 million personal recognizance bond secured by eight co-signers. Her trial opened on October 7, 2013. In a bid for leniency, Bongiorno maintained that Madoff deceived her into printing bogus trade records. She claimed that she was merely doing the same thing she had been doing for over 40 years–bolstering evidence that Madoff began his Ponzi scheme far earlier than 1991.

Bongiorno was convicted in March 2014 on charges of securities fraud and tax evasion. In December 2014, Bongiorno was sentenced to six years in federal prison, the last of which was to be served under house arrest. Federal judge Laura Taylor Swain said that while she believed Bongiorno's claims that Madoff had deceived her, she could have and should have seen that Madoff's claims "seemed impossible because they were impossible." The sentence was far shorter than even the eight- to ten-year sentence recommended by her own lawyer. However, Swain believed Bongiorno's "small stature"–she is only 4.5 feet (1.4 m) tall–would put her in a "vulnerable position" in prison. In spite of this, Judge Swain would later deny Bongiorno an early release in January 2019, stating that her only option to spending the rest of her sentence outside of prison was under home confinement. Bongiorno had previously spent time in house arrest in 2010.

=== Daniel Bonventre ===
Daniel Bonventre worked as company director of operations and as an accountant for Madoff since the 1960s. He was arrested in 2010 and charged with allegedly having created false and fraudulent books and records, conspiracy, securities fraud, and tax-related charges. He is also being sued by the SEC for falsifying records. On those initial charges he may be sentenced to a maximum of 77 years in prison if convicted. In Dec 2012 Bonventre's request for access to his seized funds for legal defense purposes was turned down by U.S. District Court. In March 2013 a three-judge appeals court granted a hearing in a lower court on his seized funds access request. His trial opened on October 7, 2013. On December 8, 2014, Bonventre was sentenced to 10 years in federal prison after being convicted on securities fraud and tax-evasion charges for his involvement in Madoff's $17.5 billion fraud. He was being held at FCI Schuylkill (New York) and was scheduled for release on September 10, 2023. He was released early from prison on September 9, 2022.

=== Joann Crupi ===
Joann Crupi is a former investment advisor to Madoff. Her trial was to open on Oct 7, 2013. A jury found her guilty, and on December 15, 2014, Crupi was sentenced to 6 years in prison for her role in the scam. She was released from prison on May 28, 2019.

=== George Perez ===
George Perez is a former computer programmer of Madoff. His trial was to open on Oct 7, 2013. A jury found him guilty, and on December 10, 2014, Perez was sentenced to 2 1/2 years in prison for his role in the scam.

=== Jerome O'Hara ===
Jerome O'Hara is a former computer programmer of Madoff. His trial was to open on Oct 7, 2013. On December 9, 2014, he was sentenced to 2 1/2 years in prison for his role in the scam.

== Sosnik Bell and Co. ==
Even before Sosnik and Bell took over a small New Jersey accounting firm in the early 1990s, Madoff and his affiliate, Cohmad Securities, encouraged hundreds of individual investors to retain the firm for an annual fee of $800 for routine recordkeeping to handle their monthly statements. The firm compiled profits, losses, and gains, and prepared tax-summary statements and schedules to be used by a client's regular accountant for income tax returns, producing one-page monthly statements and a quarterly statement.

== Fairfield Greenwich Group ==
Fairfield Greenwich Group, based in Greenwich, Connecticut, had a "Fairfield Sentry" fund which was one of many feeder funds that gave investors portals to Madoff. Fairfield, in turn, set up further feeder funds such as "Lion Fairfield Capital Management" in Singapore and "Stellar US Absolute Return", all conduits to Madoff, directing a total of $7.5 billion.

Madoff was able to pitch his business in Europe and South America indirectly through Fairfield fund's founder, Walter Noel's son-in-law Andrés Piedrahita. Another Noel son-in-law's territory included Asia. Madoff began advertising openly, contrary to his initial strategy of handpicking investors. The company is listed as a defendant in an investor lawsuit filed in Miami.

In August 2008, JPMorgan Chase pulled $250 million from this Madoff feeder fund account. Chase had become "concerned about lack of transparency," and due-diligence which had "raised doubts" about Madoff's operation.

On April 1, 2009, the Commonwealth of Massachusetts filed a civil action charging Fairfield Greenwich with fraud, breaching its fiduciary duty to clients by failing to provide promised due diligence on its investments. The complaint seeks a fine and restitution to Massachusetts investors for losses and disgorgement of performance fees paid to Fairfield by those investors. It alleges that in 2005 Mr. Madoff coached Fairfield staff about ways to answer questions from SEC attorneys who were looking into Harry Markopolos' complaint about Madoff's operations. The Secretary of State has no plans to settle the lawsuit in spite of the fact that Fairfield Greenwich has offered to repay all Massachusetts investors, and is expected to force Fairfield to explain e-mails and other evidence he has uncovered that appear to show company officials knew about potential problems with Madoff but failed to disclose them to clients.

On April 13, 2009, Judge Arthur Hiller in Bridgeport, Connecticut, dissolved the temporary order he imposed March 30 freezing Noel's and Tucker's assets. Noel agreed to attachments of $10 million to his Greenwich home, and $2 million from Jeffrey Tucker. Noel's attorney is Glenn Kurtz, and Tucker's is Stanley Tawdry, Jr.. The pension fund case is Retirement Program for Employees of the Town of Fairfield v. Madoff, FBT-CV-09-5023735-S, Superior Court of Connecticut (Bridgeport)

On May 18, 2009, the hedge fund was sued by bankruptcy trustee, Irving Picard. The complaint seeks a return of $3.2 billion during the period from 2002 – Madoff's arrest in December 2008. However, the money may already be in the hands of Fairfield's own clients, who are likely off-limits to Picard, since they weren't direct investors with Madoff.

On May 29, 2009, Fairfield Sentry, based in the British Virgin Islands, filed a lawsuit seeking to recover more than $919 million in investment management and performance fees that it paid to Fairfield. The lawsuit alleges breach of fiduciary duty, and unjust enrichment. It is "the largest victim of the fraud perpetrated by Bernard L. Madoff," losing $7 billion. The defendants include founders Walter Noel and Jeffrey Tucker and other fund partners who the plaintiffs allege "failed to fulfill their contractual obligations to use best efforts to supervise the operations" of Madoff-related investments and to "oversee the day-to-day investment activities of the fund." The case is Fairfield Sentry Ltd. v. Fairfield Greenwich Group, 601687/2009, New York State Supreme Court (Manhattan).

On July 20, 2009, Justice Edward Alexander Bannister granted the request to liquidate the Fairfield Sentry funds, worth more than $7.2 billion in December 2008, now less than $70 million, incorporated in 1990 under the mutual fund statutes of the British Virgin Islands and technically under the control of their local directors.

== Sonja Kohn ==
On December 10, 2010, Irving Picard sued Sonja Kohn and her bank, Bank Medici, for $58.8 billion, accusing Kohn of being a "criminal soul mate" of Madoff. She was accused of directing $9.1 billion to Madoff's fraud, about half of the actual money lost. On October 18, 2013, Kohn was found not guilty of the civil charges leveled against her by the High Court in London and thus relieved of any liability to the Madoff creditors.

== J. Ezra Merkin ==
J. Ezra Merkin, a prominent investment advisor and philanthropist, has been sued for his role in running a "feeder fund" for Madoff. Merkin informed investors in his $1.8 billion Ascot Partners fund on December 11 that he was among those who suffered substantial personal losses, since all of the fund's money was invested with Madoff. The Connecticut Attorney General Richard Blumenthal is examining the role boards of nonprofits played, in possibly not conducting due diligence on donors' contributions.

On April 6, 2009, New York Attorney General Andrew Cuomo filed civil fraud charges against J. Ezra Merkin alleging he "betrayed hundreds of investors" by moving $2.4 billion of clients' money to Bernard Madoff without their knowledge. The complaint states, he lied about putting the money with Madoff, failed to disclose conflicts of interest, and collected over $470 million in fees for his three hedge funds, Ascot Partners LP with Ascot Fund Ltd., Gabriel Capital Corp. and Ariel Fund Ltd. He promised he would actively manage the money, but instead, he misguided investors about his Madoff investments in quarterly reports, in investor presentations, and in conversations with investors. "Merkin held himself out to investors as an investing guru...In reality, Merkin was but a master marketer."

In addition, the complaint accused Merkin of improperly commingling his personal funds with his hedge fund accounts and using some of the money to buy artwork worth more than $91 million. Mr. Cuomo's office is seeking restitution and unspecified damages from Mr. Merkin.

On May 7, 2009, Madoff Bankruptcy Trustee, Irving Picard filed a lawsuit against Merkin seeking to recover almost $500 million withdrawn from Madoff accounts in the last six years. The complaint alleges that since 1995, Merkin steered more than $1 billion to Madoff through three private hedge funds, Ascot Partners, Ariel Fund and Gabriel Capital. Since 2002, the funds withdrew at least $494 million from Madoff — returns that Merkin "knew or should have known" were fraudulent.

As of May 18, 2009, Merkin's control of Ascot, Gabriel and Ariel hedge funds are to be placed into receivership for liquidation by Guidepost Partners. One receiver will be responsible for managing the remaining money, nearly $1 billion, in the Gabriel and Ariel funds, and another will be responsible for overseeing Ascot, whose entire $1.8 billion in assets was lost to Madoff's Ponzi scheme.

On June 22, 2012, Merkin avoided prison after agreeing to pay back $405 million to investors in his hedge funds without any finding of fraud on his part. Picard, however, sued in bankruptcy court to stop the settlement, saying it obstructed his own effort to obtain $500 million from Merkin and his funds for other investors. Ultimately, Picard's suit to stop the settlement was unsuccessful.

== Cohmad Securities Corp. ==
Cohmad Securities, whose name combines "Cohn" and "Madoff", founded in 1985 by Madoff and Cohn, Madoff's friend and former neighbor. Maurice "Sonny" Cohn owned 48% of Cohmad, and his daughter Marcia, who served as president and chief compliance officer owned 25%. Madoff owned 15%. Mr. Madoff's brother, Peter owned 9%, and Mr. Cohn's brother owned 1%, and another unnamed Cohmad employee owned 1%.

The brokerage firm lists its address as Madoff's firm's address in New York City. Cohmad employs Robert Jaffe, as vice president. Jaffe is married to Ellen Shapiro, daughter of Boston philanthropist Carl J. Shapiro, the founder and former chairman of apparel company Kay Windsor Inc., and an early investor and close friend of Madoff. Jaffe reportedly convinced the elder Shapiro to invest $250 million with Madoff just 10 days before Madoff's arrest.

Jaffe, a philanthropist, "worked the Palm Beach, Florida circuit, and attracted many Palm Beach Country Club members as investors." Jaffe brought in 150 accounts and more than $1 billion to Madoff. Madoff paid Jaffe directly through accounts he kept with Madoff at much higher returns than earned by other investors. Between 1996 and 2008, Jaffe withdrew at least $150 million, and the SEC claims he was aware Madoff was engaged in fictitious trading. Jaffe has said he received a commission of 1% to 2% from an investor's first profit, and he paid commissions to financial advisers who steered cash to Madoff's fund.

Richard Spring, of Boca Raton, Florida, received payments from Cohmad for many years in exchange for bringing investors and investment ideas to Madoff.

Alvin J. "Sonny" Delaire, Jr. of Far Hills, New Jersey, also recruited clients for Madoff's advisory business. Delaire has been sued by Dr. Martin and Suzanne Schulman of Nassau County, New York, claiming they were induced by Delaire to make investments with Madoff "based on fraudulent misrepresentations by Delaire and his omissions to disclose material facts." The lawsuit seeks a minimum of $9.6 million in damages since 2002 from Delaire. The case is Martin Schulman, M.D. and Suzanne Schulman v Alvin J. Delaire, Jr. 09-3871U.S. District Court for the Southern District of New York (Manhattan).

Cohmad had fewer than 650 client accounts, and made 99.7% of its sales from brokerage services to Madoff's larger broker-dealer. In its audited financial statements for the 12 months ending June 30, 2008, Cohmad said revenue from Madoff Securities totaled $3,736,829. Its total sales for the same period were $3,748,397.

On January 14, 2009, William F. Galvin, Secretary of the Commonwealth of Massachusetts, who is in charge of the state's securities issues, filed suit against Jaffe, who promoted Madoff's funds to wealthy investors in Massachusetts and Florida. On February 4, compelled to testify, Jaffe invoked his Fifth Amendment right. Marcia Cohn, Maurice Cohn, and Alvin Delaire, Jr. failed to appear. On February 11, 2009, Galvin filed a complaint seeking to revoke the Massachusetts license of Cohmad Securities Corp., an accounting of all Massachusetts investors Cohmad referred to Madoff's company, all the fees it earned doing so (more than $67 million), and a fine. It cited $526,000 in referral fees paid from Madoff Investments, to Cohmad, to Vienna Bank Medici majority owner, Sonja Kohn, which she subsequently denied. On May 28, 2009, Bank Medici lost its Austrian banking license. Kohn and the Bank are under investigation.

On May 8, 2009, the Commonwealth of Massachusetts found the firm to be in "default" for not assisting regulators. Cohmad's securities registration has been revoked, and they must provide an accounting of all fees the company or its agents earned for referring Massachusetts investors to Mr. Madoff's firm as well as, pay a $100,000 fine for failing to cooperate with the state securities investigation.

On March 15, 2009, Federal prosecutors filed a notice in federal court declaring its intent to seek the forfeiture of the Madoffs' interests in Cohmad Securities.

On June 22, 2009, Madoff Trustee, Irving Picard filed a claim against Cohmad, founder Maurice "Sonny" Cohn, daughter Marcia Cohn, and Robert Jaffe, among more than two dozen individuals and trusts in U.S. Bankruptcy Court in New York. The lawsuit claims that up to 90 percent of Cohmad's income came from referring clients and that the firm had a "symbiotic" relationship with Madoff, having earned hundreds of millions of dollars from the fraud. The lawsuit seeks more than $100 million paid to Cohmad six years prior to Madoff's firm declaring bankruptcy, and more than $105 million in profits Cohmad employees and their families withdrew from the investment accounts they held with Madoff.

On June 22, 2009, the U.S. Securities and Exchange Commission (SEC) also filed civil fraud charges against co-founder Maurice "Sonny" Cohn, president Marcia Cohn, and Robert Jaffe. The lawsuit alleges the company was Madoff's "in-house marketing arm" and critical to Madoff's scam. Cohmad representatives were paid for funds they brought into the firm but not for any increase in the investments' value. Withdrawals were treated as a loss, which "suggested that profits generated by Madoff were fictitious", although Madoff changed the arrangement for Maurice Cohn in 2002, to pay him a flat $2 million a year.

Jaffe has filed requests with the Courts to dismiss the SEC and the Picard cases. The cases are Picard v. Cohmad Securities Corp., 09-AP- 1305, U.S. Bankruptcy Court, Southern District of New York (Manhattan), and SEC v. Cohmad, 09-cv-5680, U.S. District Court, (Southern District of New York.).

== Stanley Chais, the Brighton Company ==
Stanley Chais was a wealthy investment advisor from Beverly Hills, California, who was accused of steering money to private interests, including Madoff, through Chais's Brighton Co., a limited partnership formed to manage money. He took about 3.8% of the profits as management fees. His Chais Family Foundation, which in 2007 reported assets of $178 million and charitable contributions of nearly $8.2 million, was wiped out and has shut down. He had a home in Beverly Hills, and an apartment in New York.

On May 1, 2009, Irving Picard, bankruptcy trustee, filed a lawsuit against Stanley Chais, 82. The complaint alleged Chais "knew or should have known" he was deep in a Ponzi scheme when his family investments with Madoff averaged 40% and sometimes soared as high as 300%. It also claimed Chais was a primary beneficiary of the scheme for at least 30 years, allowing his family to withdraw more than $1 billion from their accounts since 1995 – money that belonged to Madoff victims. The case number is Picard v. Chais, 09-01172. When Chais claimed to be broke, Picard told a judge that Chais should sell his Fifth Avenue New York apartment to pay his legal fees.

On June 22, 2009, the SEC filed civil fraud charges against Chais. According to the complaint, Chais told Madoff he didn't want to see any losses on the funds' trades. On September 23, 2009, California Attorney General Jerry Brown filed a lawsuit against Chais seeking $25 million in penalties and restitution for victims. Federal prosecutors had opened a criminal probe into him, but he died in September 2010 before they filed charges against him. His lawyer denied that Chais committed any wrongdoing.

Michael Chaleff, a former Justice Department lawyer, was part of a 50-member investment group named CMG that lost $75 million to $80 million it gave to Chais' Brighton Co. Chaleff filed a $250-million class action federal lawsuit against Chais in Los Angeles, as did screenwriter Eric Roth. New Jersey State Senator Loretta Weinberg lost her entire life savings in Chais' "Arbitrage Partnerships" fund.

Chais died on September 26, 2010, at age 84, in Manhattan, where he and his wife had moved to further the treatment of a blood disorder that eventually took his life.

The widow, children, family, and estate of Chais settled with Picard in 2016 for $277 million. On November 19, 2016, the United States Bankruptcy Court for the Southern District of New York approved a global settlement – made in cooperation with the California Attorney General - with the defendants in Picard v. the Estate of Stanley Chais, et al. The agreement was made with the Stanley Chais estate, Chais's widow, children, and a number of other Chais family members, investment funds, trusts, companies, and other entities associated with Chais. Under the terms of the agreement, the BLMIS Customer Fund received $277 million, including a cash payment of $258.47 million, as well as the assignment of other assets that would be liquidated over time. All proceeds of the settlement were to go to the BLMIS Customer Fund for the benefit of BLMIS customers with allowed claims. Picard's lawyers said the settlement covered all of Chais' estate and substantially all of his widow's assets, and represented "a good faith, complete and total compromise."

== Tremont Group Holdings ==
Tremont Group Holdings, a division of MassMutual, started its first Madoff-only fund in 1997. That group managed several funds marketed under the Rye Select Broad Market Fund, which charged a 1% management fee and a 0.5% administration fee. The fund held $2.3 billion on Sep 30, 2008, collecting $34 million in fees a year. Tremont also offered the Rye Select Broad Market Portfolio Ltd., which charged total fees of 1.95% of assets and held $1.2 billion on Sep 30, 2008, with annual fees of $23.5 million. For investing $3.3 billion, Tremont was scheduled to receive over $30 million in fees in 2008. The town of Fairfield, Conn., is seeking the recovery of fees, and the assets of Robert Schulman, who once ran Tremont Group Holdings have been temporarily frozen.

Massachusetts Mutual Life Insurance Co. has agreed to pay more than $1 billion to customers of the now-imprisoned Bernard Madoff in July 2011. The bankruptcy trustee sued Tremont, a group of hedge funds owned by Massachusetts Mutual Life Insurance Co, as well as, its parent companies in December 2010, seeking more than $2 billion and alleging that company executives ignored "obvious warning signs" that Madoff was running a fraud. Picard alleged that Tremont failed to do any meaningful review of Madoff's operations or purported investment results, blindly allowing Rye to turn over half its $6 billion in client assets to Madoff and losing half that money when the scheme finally collapsed. The payment of $1 billion to the Madoff trustee, provided by Massachusetts Mutual Life as a loan to Tremont, may have protected the reputation and financial interest of Massachusetts Mutual Life, as well as, saved Tremont's customers with net gains from Madoff from clawbacks. Some investors of Tremont had a net gains and could have been subject to clawbacks from the bankruptcy attorney if Tremont was forced into insolvency and the bankruptcy attorney could then examine the books of Tremont to see the actual investors' net Madoff gains.

Lawsuits filed have been consolidated into three categories: federal security laws, insurance actions, and state law actions. They are: Lange, et al. v. Mass. Mutual Life Ins. Co., et al. (08 CV 11117, S.D. N.Y.); Finkelstein v. Tremont Group Holdings, Inc. (08 CV 11141, S.D. N.Y.); Peshkin v. Tremont Group Holdings, et al. (08 CV 11183, S.D.N.Y.).; Arthur M. Brainson IRA R/O v. Rye Select Broad Market Fund, L.P., et al. (No. 08 CV 11212, S.D.N.Y.); and Group Defined Pension Plan & Trust v. Tremont Market Neutral Fund, L.P., et al. (No. 08 CV 11359, S.D.N.Y.). The plaintiffs are all investors in hedge funds with assets that they entrusted to Madoff for investment.

Four state law cases have been consolidated with Hagens Berman Sobol Shapiro as co-lead counsel. They initially filed a class-action lawsuit on behalf of investors and groups that invested capital with Tremont Group Holdings, alleging the company and others grossly neglected fiduciary duties and lost a total of $3.3 billion in assets, $3.1 billion from the Rye Funds invested with Bernard Madoff Investment Securities, relinquishing management to Madoff while continuing to receive client management fees. The complaint names Tremont Group Holdings, its Rye Investment Funds, Oppenheimer Acquisition Corporation, OppenheimerFunds, which owns Tremont, Massachusetts Mutual Life Insurance Company, a majority owner of OppenheimerFunds and KPMG, Tremont's auditor, as defendants.

On April 13, 2009, Judge Arthur Hiller in Bridgeport, Connecticut, dissolved the temporary order he imposed March 30 freezing assets, in exchange for a pledge of $2.5 million in total from Tremont Entities and Robert Shulman and $500,000 from Oppenheimer Acquisition Corporation. The pension fund case is Retirement Program for Employees of the Town of Fairfield v. Madoff, FBT-CV-09-5023735-S, Superior Court of Connecticut (Bridgeport)

The Tremont Group is represented by Michael Gruenglas of Skadden, Arps, Slate, Meagher & Flom in New York.

=== Maxam Capital ===
Madoff was the investment adviser over all the $300 million Maxam Absolute Return Fund's assets. Maxam was scheduled to receive $2.8 million for investing $280 million in 2008. The Town of Fairfield, Connecticut, invested in Madoff through the Return Fund created by Maxam Capital Management LLC, based in Darien, Connecticut. The Maxam fund in turn invested in Madoff through Tremont. Sandra L. Manzke, the founder of Maxam Capital, has had her assets temporarily frozen by the same Connecticut court.

Maxam Absolute Return Fund LP has filed a lawsuit in Connecticut Superior Court in Fairfield County against auditors Goldstein Golub Kessler LLP and McGladrey & Pullen LLP to recover losses, claiming they relied on the auditors for their expertise in examining Madoff's firm.

On April 13, 2009, Judge Arthur Hiller in Bridgeport, Connecticut, dissolved the temporary order he imposed March 30 freezing assets, and ordered Sandra Manzke, to provide a $2.5 million mortgage on a piece of property she owns in Vermont. Maxam's attorney, Jonathan D. Cogan said,"The Town of Fairfield's suit is an outrageous publicity stunt to divert attention from the town's own decision to invest in Madoff, which was made long before it did business with Maxam." The pension fund case is Retirement Program for Employees of the Town of Fairfield v. Madoff, FBT-CV-09-5023735-S, Superior Court of Connecticut (Bridgeport)

On July 28, 2011, Irving Picard, the receiver assigned to Madoff's Ponzi scheme, extracted a settlement from Tremont worth over one billion dollars.

== Defender ==
Defender Limited acted as a feeder fund, by funneling clients' funds to Bernard Madoff's firm, Bernard L. Madoff Investment Securities (BLMIS), as part of the Ponzi scheme run by Madoff. In December 2013, Defender sued HSBC Institutional Trust Services Incorporated, an Irish subsidiary of HSBC Bank with registered offices in Dublin, in an Irish court for $539 million. Defender alleged that the bank failed to conduct adequate due diligence on Madoff, and failed to warn Defender that HSBC was not able to confirm the existence of Defender's assets. In December 2018, the High Court of Ireland ruled that Defender's claim against HSBC was reduced by 100% due to Defender's earlier settlement with BLMIS. Defender appealed that decision to the Irish Court of Appeal. On April 14, 2021, the day Madoff died, the case settled immediately before proceedings were due to begin in court before Mr Justice Mark Sanfey, and was scheduled to last 24 weeks.

On April 16, 2015, the United States Bankruptcy Court for the Southern District of New York approved an agreement between Picard on the one hand, and Defender and related entities on the other hand. The BLMIS Customer Fund benefited by $93 million. Defender received a $522.8 million claim in the BLMIS liquidation, because Defender had deposited more with BLMIS than Defender withdrew.

== Fiserv Inc. ==
A $1 billion class-action federal lawsuit was filed in Colorado against Fiserv, Inc. of Brookfield, Wisconsin, whose subsidiaries were custodians for pension or IRA accounts and invested with Madoff. The complaint alleges Fiserv failed "to hold and safeguard assets entrusted to it" by about 800 Madoff customers who had been told to hire Fiserv to handle their accounts with him. Fiserv is accused of breach of fiduciary duty, fraud, negligence, and aiding and abetting breach of fiduciary. Fiserv sold its investment account administration business in 2007 to TD Ameritrade, also a defendant. The lawsuit estimates Fiserv generated at least $25 million annually from Madoff investors, and claims it wasn't diligent because "Fiserv had too much revenue at stake to risk upsetting Madoff."

In June 2011, Judge Christine M. Arguello ruled in favor of Fiserv Inc. and its co-defendants. Arguello found that the investors bore responsibility for the investment decisions, and that the funds transferred to Madoff were done so at the direction of the investors. Although Madoff was included among Fiserv's investment options, Arguello noted that the IRA agreements provided to Fiserv's investors clearly indemnified the defendants, and that Fiserv "had no obligation to verify or audit."

== David and Craig Kugel ==
On November 16, 2011, longtime Madoff trader David Kugel pleaded guilty to backdating trades for Madoff. Kugel joined the firm in 1970, eventually becoming a supervisor with Madoff's legitimate proprietary trading operation. In his allocution, he admitted creating bogus trading records as early as the 1970s–further undermining Madoff's claim that he only began his fraud in 1991. He made greater than $10 million in profits from investments with Madoff, and his salary was as high as $588,000 a year. He told prosecutors that after the main backoffice secretary on the 17th floor–Annette Bongiorno in the 1970s and 1980s, and Judi Crupi from the 1980s onward–told him how much money should be "invested" for a client, he would note how much volume actually occurred so the "trades" looked real. He faced up to 85 years in prison. However, after testifying at the Bongiorno, Crupi, Bonventre and Perez trials, he was sentenced to 10 months' house arrest and 200 hours community service in 2015.

Craig Kugel pleaded guilty to tax fraud; he arranged salaries for non-employees.
