= Defender Limited =

Investment fund

- Genre: investment fund
- Founded: May 2007 in British Virgin Islands
- Founder: Reliance Group
- Headquarters: British Virgin Islands

Defender Limited is an investment fund. It was incorporated in the British Virgin Islands in 2007. Defender funneled clients' funds to Bernard Madoff's firm as part of a Ponzi scheme run by Madoff. Madoff was arrested in December 2008, and pleaded guilty to fraud in 2009. He is serving a 150-year prison term.

== Formation ==
Defender was formed in May 2007. It was formed with the support of individuals who had encouraged investing with Madoff since 1999. According to the Securities Investor Protection Act (SIPA) Trustee for BLIMIS assets Irving Picard, Defender was created by the Reliance Group. The Reliance Group was, according to Picard, in turn established by Tim Brockmann, an investment manager in Switzerland and Gibraltar.

== Activities ==
Defender acted as a feeder fund, by funneling clients' funds to Bernard Madoff's firm, Bernard L. Madoff Investment Securities (BLMIS), as part of a Ponzi scheme run by Madoff. Madoff was arrested in December 2008, and pleaded guilty to fraud in 2009. He is serving a 150-year prison term.

== Litigation ==
In December 2013, Defender sued HSBC Continental Europe (formerly HSBC France; HSBC Institutional Trust Services Incorporated), an Irish subsidiary of HSBC Bank with registered offices in Dublin, in an Irish court for $539 million. Defender alleged that the bank failed to conduct adequate due diligence on Madoff, and failed to warn Defender that HSBC was not able to confirm the existence of Defender's assets. In December 2018, the High Court of Ireland ruled that Defender's claim against HSBC was reduced by 100% due to Defender's earlier settlement with BLMIS. Defender appealed that decision to the Irish Court of Appeal. On April 14, 2021, the day Madoff died, the case settled immediately before proceedings were due to begin in court before Mr Justice Mark Sanfey, and was scheduled to last 24 weeks.

On April 16, 2015, the United States Bankruptcy Court for the Southern District of New York approved an agreement between Picard on the one hand, and Defender and related entities on the other hand. The BLMIS Customer Fund benefited by $93 million. Defender received a $522.8 million claim in the BLMIS liquidation, because Defender had deposited more with BLMIS than Defender withdrew.

== See also ==
- List of investors in Bernard L. Madoff Securities
