= Kingate Management =

Hedge fund

- Company type: Hedge fund
- Headquarters: Hamilton, Bermuda

Kingate Management is a Hamilton, Bermuda hedge fund. It was a feeder fund into the securities firm of Bernie Madoff, as part of the Madoff investment scandal.

== History ==
Kingate Management and Tremont Capital Management set up Kingate Global Fund Ltd. (KING) as a joint venture. It charged an initial fee of 5%, and then 1.5% of assets per year. It was one of the largest feeder funds of Bernie Madoff, and raised $3.5 billion for Madoff starting in 1994. It was overseen by FIM Advisers LLP, a London firm.

The fund lost all of its assets in the Madoff Ponzi scheme.

In September 2019 the Joint Liquidators of Kingate Global Fund and Kingate Euro Fund announced that the High Court of the Virgin Islands approved a global settlement with Irving Picard, as trustee for the liquidation of Bernard L. Madoff Investment Securities. The approval followed the approval by the US Bankruptcy Court for the Southern District of New York, and subject to approval by the Supreme Court of Bermuda in an October 2019 hearing, the parties agreed to a mutual release of all claims.

== See also ==
- List of investors in Bernard L. Madoff Securities
