= Daniel Bonventre =

American businessman

Daniel Bonventre (born c. 1944) is one of five former Madoff employees charged in the Madoff investment scandal.

He had worked as one-time company director of operations and as an accountant for Madoff since the 1960s. He was arrested on February 25, 2010, and charged with having created false and fraudulent books and records, conspiracy, securities fraud, and tax-related charges. He was also sued by the SEC for falsifying records.

Prosecutors claimed that Bonventre used $154 million of clients' funds to help obtain a $145 million loan. He was also charged with concealing over $270,000 in income tax between 2003 and 2007.

Another criminal complaint alleged that he helped to arrange millions in illegal payments and loans to Madoff family members and unidentified employees, some of which were used to purchase luxury homes.

In April 2006, almost three years before other investors lost their life savings, Bonventre emptied his personal accounts at the firm.

On March 24, 2014, he was convicted. He may be sentenced to a maximum of 77 years in prison if convicted.

On February 25, 2010, he was freed on a $5 million bond.

On December 21, 2010, prosecutors sent a letter to Bonventre's defense lawyer, Andrew J. Frisch, demanding that none of the $820,000 given to him to defend the case be used. The reason for this was because the funds would be subject to forfeiture if Bonventre were convicted of criminal charges.

In January 2011, Bonventre filed a suit demanding that the indictment against him be dismissed because the prosecutor had made efforts to seize his defense funds.

On December 8, 2014, Bonventre was sentenced to 10 years in prison, after being convicted on securities fraud and tax-evasion charges for his involvement in Madoff's $17.5 billion fraud.

== See also ==
- 2008 financial crisis
- Affinity fraud
- Participants in the Madoff investment scandal
- Recovery of funds from the Madoff investment scandal
