= Cohmad Securities =

- Industry: finance
- Founded: 1985
- Founder: Bernard Madoff; Maurice Cohn
- Owner: (15%)(Founder) Bernard Madoff (48%)(Founder) Maurice Cohn (25%)(President) Marcia Cohn (9%)Peter Madoff (1%)Mr. Cohn's brother (1%)Cohmad employee

Cohmad Securities was a US company whose main business was to introduce investors to the Bernard Madoff investment company for which it received commission based on the amount invested. The company, whose name combines “Cohn” and “Madoff,” was founded in 1985 by Bernard Madoff and Maurice Cohn, Madoff's friend and former neighbor. Its office was located at the same address as Madoff's firm, and it employed between 10 and 20 employees with annual sales between $1M and $5M.

== Business relations ==
Maurice "Sonny" Cohn owned 48% of Cohmad, and his daughter Marcia, who served as president and chief compliance officer, owned 25%. Madoff owned 15%. Mr. Madoff's brother, Peter owned 9%, Mr. Cohn's brother owned 1%, and another unnamed Cohmad employee owned 1%. Cohmad received $67 million in generated fees from Madoff investments, from 2000 to 2008. The brokerage firm lists its address as Madoff's firm's address in New York City. Cohmad employs Robert Jaffe, as vice-president. Jaffe is married to Ellen Shapiro, daughter of Boston philanthropist Carl J. Shapiro, the founder and former chairman of apparel company Kay Windsor Inc. and an early investor and close friend of Madoff. Jaffe reportedly convinced the elder Shapiro to invest $250 million with Madoff just 10 days before Madoff's arrest.

Cohmad had fewer than 650 client accounts, and made 99.7% of its sales from brokerage services to Madoff's larger broker-dealer. In its audited financial statements for the 12 months ending June 30, 2008, Cohmad said revenue from Madoff Securities totaled $3,736,829. Its total sales for the same period were $3,748,397.

== Bernard Madoff agents ==
Jaffe, a philanthropist, "worked the Palm Beach, Florida circuit" and "attracted many Palm Beach Country Club members as investors." Jaffe brought in 150 accounts and more than $1 billion to Madoff. Madoff paid Jaffe directly through accounts he kept with Madoff at much higher returns than those earned by other investors. Between 1996 and 2008, Jaffe withdrew at least $150 million, and the SEC claims he was aware Madoff was engaged in fictitious trading. Jaffe has said he received a commission of 1% to 2% from an investor's first profit, and he paid commissions to financial advisers who steered cash to Madoff's fund.

== Civil lawsuits, investigations and revocation ==
On January 14, 2009, William Galvin, Massachusetts Secretary of the Commonwealth, who is in charge of the state's securities issues, filed suit against Jaffe, a Cohmad broker for Madoff, who promoted Madoff's funds to wealthy investors in Massachusetts and Florida. On February 4, compelled to testify, Jaffe invoked his Fifth Amendment right. Marcia Cohn, Maurice Cohn and Alvin Delaire Jr. failed to appear. On February 11, 2009, Galvin filed a complaint seeking to revoke the Massachusetts license of Cohmad Securities Corp., an accounting of all Massachusetts investors Cohmad referred to Madoff's company, all the fees it earned doing so (more than $67 million), and a fine. It named Ruth Madoff as having withdrawn $10 million on December 10, 2008, and $5.5 million on November 25, 2008, from her brokerage account. It also cited $526,000 in referral fees paid from Madoff Investments, to Cohmad, to Vienna Bank Medici majority owner, Sonja Kohn, which she subsequently denied. On May 28, 2009, Bank Medici lost its Austrian banking license. Kohn and the Bank are under investigation.

On May 8, 2009, the Commonwealth of Massachusetts found the firm to be in “default” for not assisting regulators. Cohmad's securities registration has been revoked, and they must provide an accounting of all fees the company or its agents earned for referring Massachusetts investors to Mr. Madoff's firm as well as, pay a $100,000 fine for failing to cooperate with the state securities investigation.

On March 15, 2009, Federal prosecutors filed a notice in federal court declaring its intent to seek the forfeiture of the Madoffs' interests in Cohmad Securities.

On June 22, 2009, Madoff Trustee, Irving Picard filed a claim against Cohmad, founder Maurice “Sonny” Cohn, daughter Marcia Cohn, Robert Jaffe, Richard Spring, Alvin J. Delaire Jr., Stanley Mervin Berman, Jonathan Greenberg, Cyril Jalon, Morton Kurzrok, and Rosalie Buccellato, among more than two dozen individuals and trusts in U.S. Bankruptcy Court in New York. The lawsuit claims that up to 90 percent of Cohmad's income came from referring clients and that the firm had a “symbiotic” relationship with Madoff, having earned hundreds of millions of dollars from the fraud. The lawsuit seeks more than $100 million paid to Cohmad six years prior to Madoff's firm declaring bankruptcy, and more than $105 million in profits Cohmad employees and their families withdrew from the investment accounts they held with Madoff.

On June 22, 2009, the U.S. Securities and Exchange Commission (SEC) also filed civil fraud charges against co-founder Maurice "Sonny" Cohn, president Marcia Cohn, and Robert Jaffe. The lawsuit alleges the company was Madoff's "in-house marketing arm" and critical to Madoff's scam. Cohmad representatives were paid for funds they brought into the firm but not for any putative increase in the investments' value. Withdrawals were treated as a loss, which "suggested that profits generated by Madoff were fictitious", although Madoff changed the arrangement in 2002 for Maurice Cohn, and began paying him $2 million a year.

Jaffe has filed requests with the Courts to dismiss the SEC and the Picard cases. The cases are Picard v. Cohmad Securities Corp., 09-AP- 1305, U.S. Bankruptcy Court, Southern District of New York (Manhattan), and SEC v. Cohmad, 09-cv-5680, U.S. District Court, Southern District of New York.).

== See also ==
- List of investors in Bernard L. Madoff Securities
