= MassMutual =

American mutual life insurance company

Massachusetts Mutual Life Insurance Company
- Trade name: MassMutual
- Type: Private
- Industry: Financial services
- Founded: May 15, 1851; 175 years ago
- Founder: George W. Rice
- Headquarters: Springfield, Massachusetts, U.S.
- Area served: United States
- Key people: Roger W. Crandall, (president and CEO)
- Revenue: US$10.7 billion (2022)
- AUM: US$466 billion (December 31, 2022)
- Number of employees: 11,000 (2022)
- Website: massmutual.com

The Massachusetts Mutual Life Insurance Company, also known as MassMutual, is an American life insurance company.

MassMutual provides financial products such as life insurance, disability income insurance, long term care insurance, and annuities. Major affiliate includes Barings LLC.

MassMutual ranks at 100 in the 2022 Fortune 500 list of the largest United States corporations by total revenue. The company has revenues of $10.7 billion and assets under management of $312 billion (as of 2022). The company employs more than 7,000 in the United States, and a total of 10,614 internationally.

== History ==
=== Origins ===
Massachusetts Mutual Life Insurance Company (MassMutual) began operation on May 15, 1851 in Springfield, Massachusetts. It was founded by George W. Rice, who subscribed for a guarantee capital of $100,000. As an insurance agent who sold policies for Connecticut Mutual Life Insurance Company in Hartford, Connecticut, Rice wanted to open a company of his own in neighboring Massachusetts. Similar to Connecticut Mutual, this new enterprise grew into a mutual company.

The popularity of mutual companies in the insurance industry had grown significantly between 1843 and MassMutual's creation. Approximately a dozen competing mutual companies, including Mutual Life Insurance Company of New York (1842), Mutual Life Insurance Company of New Jersey (1845), and Connecticut Mutual Life Insurance (1846), experienced promising success, because minimal amounts of working capital were required for operation.

However, MassMutual's path followed a different course when an 1851, Massachusetts state law required all insurance companies to take an initial stock subscription of $100,000. Rice met that requirement by recruiting 31 investors to purchase stock in his company to meet the mandatory subscription. After the company began operations and built sufficient reserves to meet regulatory requirements, the 31 stockholders were paid back in 1867, the stock was retired, and MassMutual functioned as a mutual company.

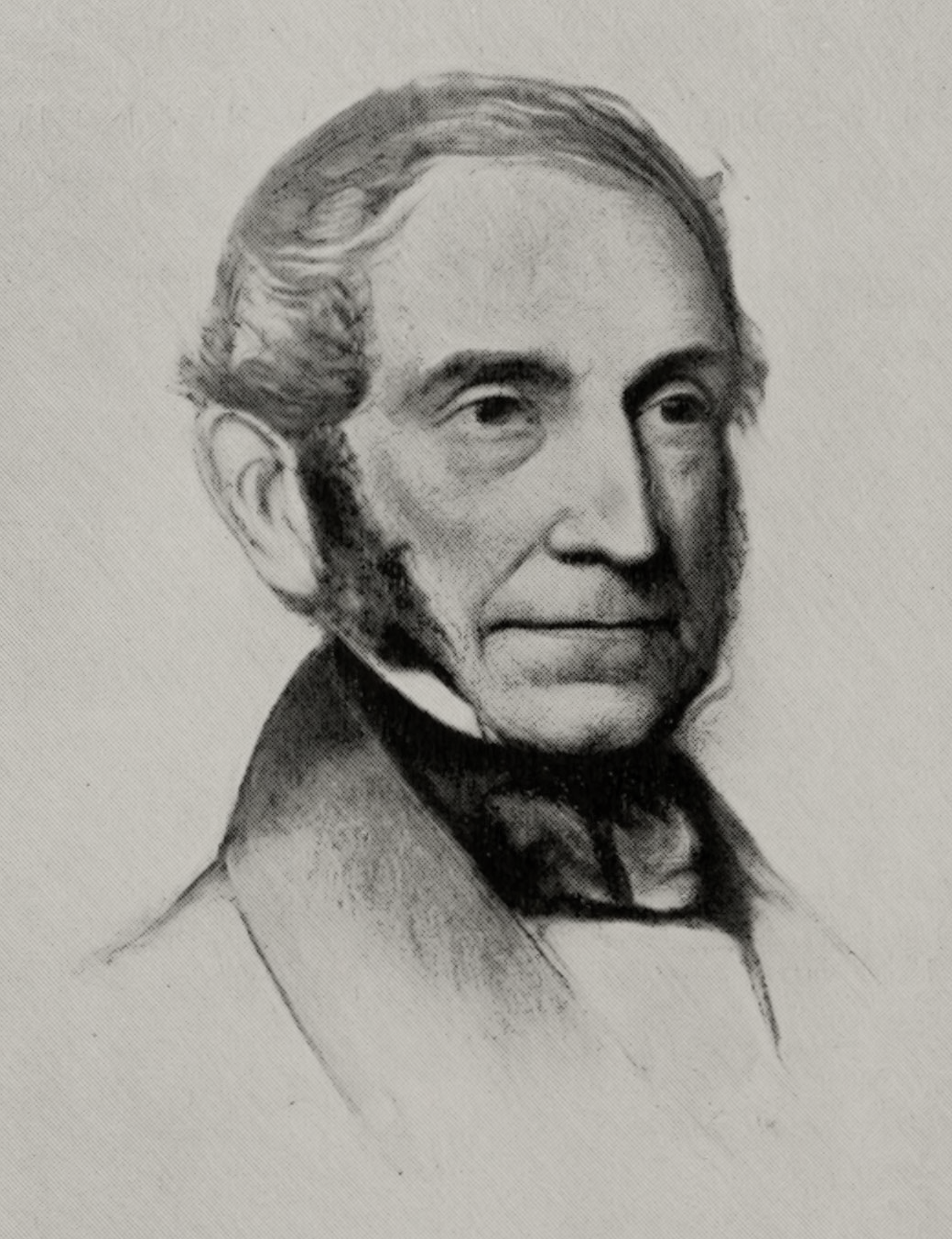
Caleb Rice (1792–1873), 1st company president, and 1st mayor of Springfield

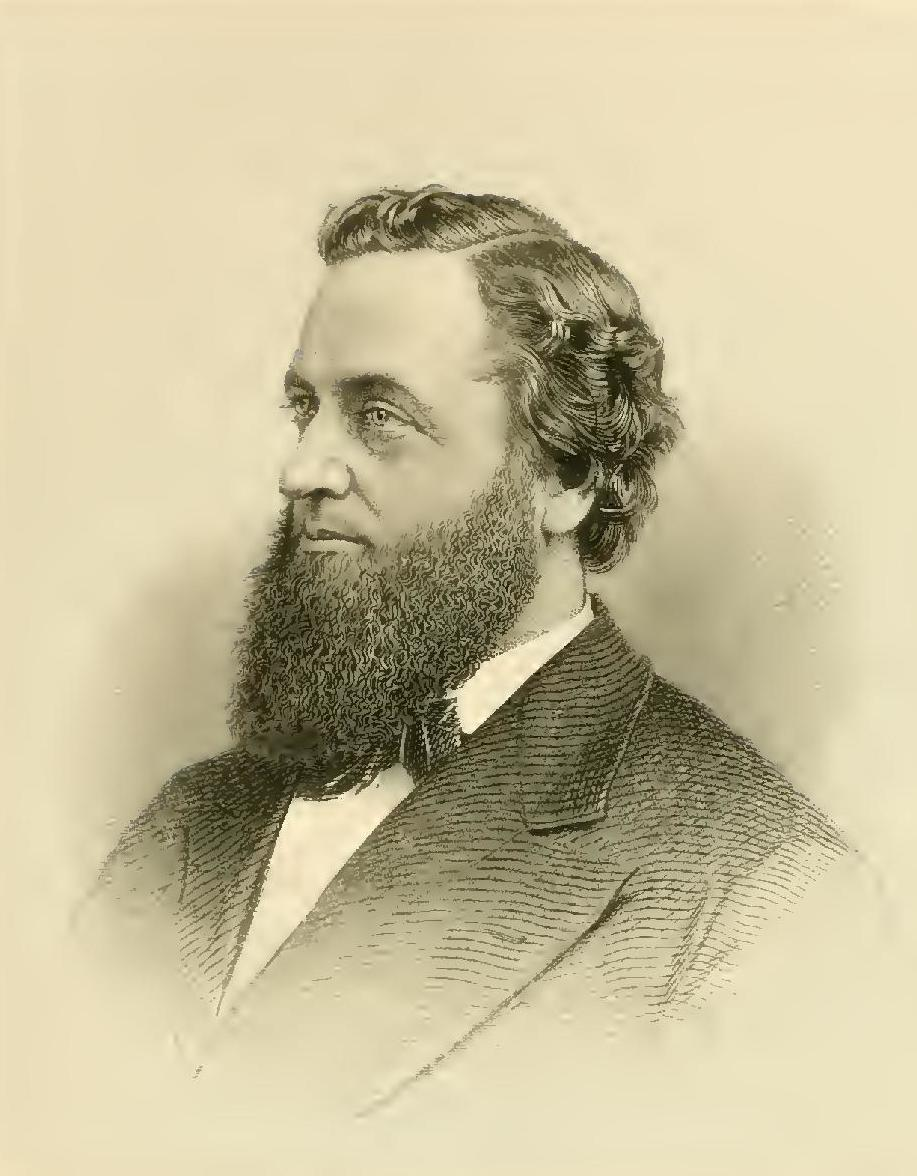
Colonel Martin Van Buren Edgerly

MassMutual's first president was Caleb Rice, appointed in 1851. A cousin of founder George W. Rice, Caleb Rice served as president of MassMutual for 22 years, making him the longest-serving president in the company's history. As a former lawyer and Sheriff of Hampden County, Massachusetts, Rice served on the Massachusetts House of Representatives for five years and was later elected as the first mayor of Springfield, Massachusetts from 1852 to 1853.

MassMutual began to sell policies to homeowners and workers throughout New England. As westward expansion grew, fueled by excitement from the California Gold Rush (1848–1855) and railroad development, MassMutual agents began to sell high-premium insurance policies to railway and steamship workers, gold-rush adventurers, and people relocating south of the Mason–Dixon line. For the next several decades, MassMutual's expansion continued to mirror that of the United States. By the time MassMutual was established, 9,000 miles (14,000 km) of functioning railroad lines had been built, giving MassMutual the opportunity to establish agencies in New York City, Cleveland, Chicago, and Detroit by 1855. MassMutual reached the West Coast in 1868 and established an office in San Francisco before the Transcontinental Railroad was completed in 1869.

Across the industry, sales of life insurance policies began to substantially increase by the late 1850s. Sales reached $200 million by 1862, then tripled to just under $600 million by the end of the Civil War. Westward expansion and increased marketing efforts of the insurance industry were largely responsible for this growth.

Another effort that contributed to the increased selling of life insurance policies was the passing of a non-forfeiture law by the Massachusetts legislature in 1861. The law forbade companies from canceling policies, even if premium payments were not received from policyholders, and stated that policies would be converted to term-life policies and companies were to pay any death claims that occurred during this term period. As the industry continued to grow, so did MassMutual, and by 1873 – just over 20 years since their first $1,000 policy was issued on August 2, 1851– the company held $4,501,909 in assets.

Caleb Rice's presidency of MassMutual came to an end in 1873 when he was succeeded by E.W. Bond, who held the position for 13 years. Bond was replaced in 1886 by Colonel Martin Van Buren Edgerly, who started his career with MassMutual in 1859. He was the first major example of MassMutual's tendency to look from within to promote and enforce inward leadership.

=== Regulated growth: The late 1800s to early 1900s ===
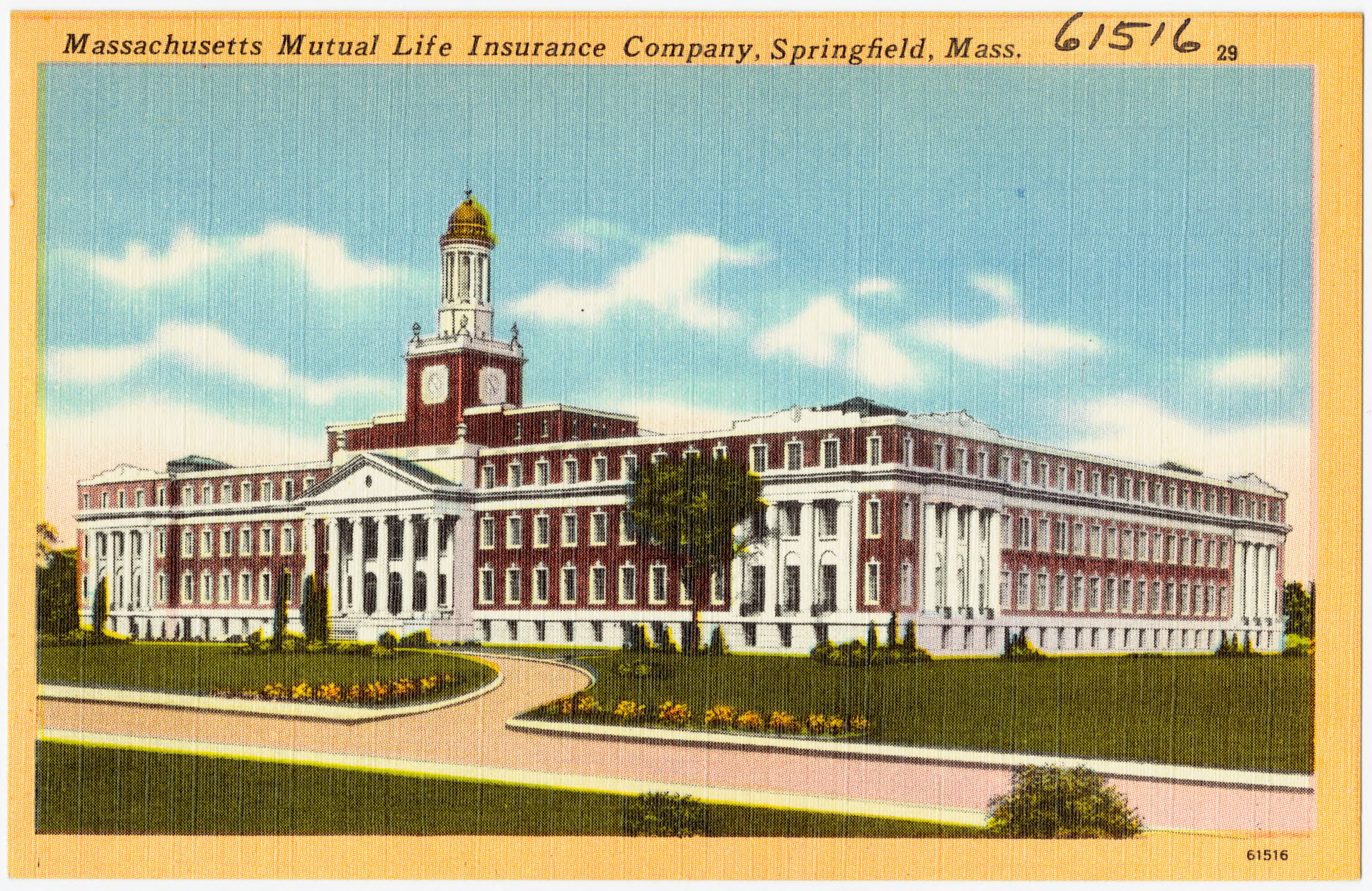
A historic postcard of Massachusetts Mutual Life Insurance Company building in Springfield, Massachusetts. The bank vault was designed by Frederick S. Holmes.

Edgerly oversaw MassMutual's growth for nearly a decade. John Hall replaced Mr. Edgerly in March 1895 and helped MassMutual's assets exceed $50,000,000. In 1901, MassMutual began to offer policies whose proceeds would be paid over a fixed period or for life, compared to policies that were only payable in lump sums at death or maturity. Before Mr. Hall's death on September 3, 1908, he guided MassMutual through the late 19th century – particularly through numerous business scandals of the early 20th century.

The 1906 Armstrong Committee investigation in 1905 uncovered the questionable financial practices of several New York life insurance companies. While MassMutual was not a specific target, the investigation required insurance companies to distribute dividends annually, to restrict the size of agents' commissions, and to regulate the nature of their investments. Policies were also required to state the provision upon creation.

As the Armstrong Investigation settled, all MassMutual policies issued after October 1, 1907, earned value according to the American Experience Table of Mortality and 3% interest. MassMutual also began to offer new services and policies to attract customers. In 1914, the company instituted a premium waiver in the event of disability, and designed policies with clauses that provided income in the event of disability in 1918.

Despite the adverse effects of the influenza epidemic in 1918, MassMutual maintained steady growth. The company employed 400 home office employees as the amount of insurance in force passed $1 billion in 1924.

However, MassMutual began to feel the direct effects of the stock market crash in 1929. As the economy plunged 22% in a matter of days and 30% of the country's workforce was faced with unemployment, death claims and policy lapses drastically increased due to an unusual number of suicides and general economic hardship. MassMutual became a last resort for people needing financial help as The Great Depression took over the United States — and the world — from 1929–1932. While the Great Depression was an economic downfall for the country, MassMutual was able to develop new products and services. MassMutual introduced its first family-income policy in 1930. Eight years later, the firm issued its first pension trust policy in 1938.

=== Postwar years ===
As the Great Depression faded from the United States in 1939, the start of World War II spurred the country's industrial and economic progression, workforce and insurance demands. Former actuary Alexander MacLean began his MassMutual presidency in 1945.

Once the United States became heavily involved with World War II and unemployment significantly decreased, MacLean oversaw the development of insurance products and services for workers. The war placed high production demands on the country's industrial workforce. As jobs were quickly created and unions strengthened, MassMutual entered the group marketplace in 1946, offering policies and managing pensions. The first group product was a pension and insurance policy for Brown-Forman Distillers – the Kentucky-based company that produced Jack Daniel's whiskey.

MassMutual maintained internal development as the postwar economy boomed by decentralizing operations through field agents. The company's home office staff, consisting of 1,350 employees, served a client base of more than 700,000 customers. MassMutual's general and district agencies contributed towards the company's growth – assets totaled $1.4 billion, with $3 billion of insurance in force by 1951. In addition, MassMutual instituted a training program for field agents and encouraged its workers to complete the American College Chartered Life Underwriter designation. Total life insurance in force doubled from $2.7 billion to $5.4 billion between 1948 and 1957.

=== Development approaching and through the 1970s ===
James R. Martin was named president in 1968. Martin led MassMutual to invest in various projects, including $75 million invested in a Springfield, Mass. office to support efforts for rejuvenating urban development in Springfield.

MassMutual began to offer flextime for employees in 1968. While MassMutual focused on life insurance, policyowners began to invest money into money market funds. MassMutual responded by forming its own money market in the late 1970s.

=== MassMutual reorganizes: 1980s to 1990s ===
William Clark, who had taken over as MassMutual's president in 1980, reorganized the company changing investment policies and introducing several new products – including universal life policies in 1981.

MML Investors Services was founded in 1981, offering mutual funds and other non-insurance products. MassMutual then reorganized in 1983 into four divisions: individual products, group life and health, group pensions, and investments. Group pensions became particularly important in the 1980s after the federal legislation began to oversee employee pensions as the Employee Retirement Income Security Act was passed in September 1974.

In addition to universal life policies being introduced in 1981, MassMutual's group pension unit was upgraded to a division the same year. By early 1984, the US economy rebounded and the country entered one of the longest periods of sustained economic growth since World War II. The group pension division's assets had reached $5 billion – making MassMutual one of the biggest managers in the United States.

The investment management group issued $693 million in commercial mortgage pass-through certificates in 1985 – the largest commercial loan issue to date. Assets stood at $15.7 billion and rose to $25.1 billion by 1989. Individual life insurance in force was $81.5 billion in 1989 – up from $54.1 billion in 1985. Despite the huge growth of the group pension and financial products divisions, MassMutual was still essentially seen as an insurance company.

=== Diversification and growth of the 1990s and new millennium ===
The 1990s brought on new opportunities for business advancement, branding, and acquisition. By this time, MassMutual was positioned as the 12th-largest insurance company in the United States based on total assets.

==== New business acquisition in the 1990s ====
- In 1990, MassMutual acquired Oppenheimer Management Corporation from British and Commonwealth Holdings PLC for $150 million as part of its strategy to diversify into mutual funds management.
- In 1993, Concert Capital Management was created as a subsidiary of MassMutual to oversee retirement funds and endowment assets.
- The investment management firm of David L. Babson & Co. was purchased in 1995 – increasing MassMutual's assets under management to more than $78 billion. Babson & Co. was combined with Concert Capital Management as separate entities of MassMutual.
- MassMutual agreed to merge with Connecticut Mutual Life Insurance Company in February 1995 with expectations to save on operational costs. The company to see $82 million in savings by the end of 1996, but surpassed expectations with $108 million.

MassMutual continued its diversification efforts through 1996 by creating Antares Leveraged Capital Corporation — a commercial finance unit providing lending services. By this time, assets of MassMutual surpassed $100 billion.

==== Growth in the new millennium ====
In 1998, MassMutual posted a record net income with 37% net income over the previous year – $359.2 million. As profits increased through 1999, the company announced a new marketing name, MassMutual Financial Group. This was an attempt to strengthen the brand as a diversified financial services company. As Chairman and CEO, Robert Connell foresaw the importance of offering new products and services. Between 1999 and 2001, MassMutual and its domestic insurance subsidiaries launched 40 new products. By 2001, nearly 70% of revenues stemmed from these products.

MassMutual's financial success continued in 2000 – total sales increased by 31% and total assets under management grew from 1999's $206.6 billion to $213.1 billion.

==== International developments ====
Along with increased monetary growth, MassMutual expanded internationally. MassMutual International purchased CRC Protective Life of Hong Kong, which was renamed as MassMutual Asia. Back in the United States, MassMutual Trust Company was created in 2000, offering investment services and estate planning, in Hartford, Connecticut.

==== Modern-day growth ====
Despite the loss of MassMutual's subsidiary OppenheimerFunds' New York offices on September 11, 2001, the subsidiary recovered well, posting strong results along with its parent company for the year. In 2001, MassMutual Financial Group's assets under management reached $234 billion. MassMutual's profit in 2005 rose from $753 million to $810 million.

Under CEO and President Roger Crandall, MassMutual whole life insurance sales rose 28% during the first six months of 2010.

In 2012, MassMutual agreed to purchase The Hartford's Retirement Plans business, ultimately acquiring it January 1, 2013. This acquisition built on MassMutual's record retirement business growth, added complementary markets and distribution capabilities, and nearly doubled the number of retirement plan participants MassMutual served.

Haven Life Insurance Agency, LLC was created as a subsidiary of MassMutual in 2015 with offices in New York. Haven Life exclusively sells term life policies.

In July 2020, Canadian-owned, Denver-based Empower Retirement announced it would be purchasing MassMutual's retirement plan business for $4.4 billion plus a contingency payout.

In November 2021, MassMutual entered into a strategic partnership with the UK-based independent power producer Low Carbon, led by CEO Roy Bedlow. This collaboration was MassMutual's first renewable energy investment in Europe.

In April 2022, Massachusetts-based Fidelity Investments announced it would be the record keeping service provider of MassMutual's corporate 401K plan.

A total of 11,593 employees make up the company's global workforce. As of 2016, MassMutual Life Insurance holds Fortune 500's 76th place – up from 2015's 94th. As of 2022, MassMutual Life Insurance holds the 100th place on the Fortune 500 list.

=== Involvement in the Madoff investment scandal ===
MassMutual owns Tremont Capital Management, a feeder fund that fed investors' money to Bernard Madoff's Ponzi scheme and ultimately lost $3.3 billion in the resulting scandal. Irving Picard, the receiver who is recovering money from the Ponzi scheme, extracted a settlement from Tremont worth over one billion dollars.
