= Frank DiPascali =

American fraudster (1956–2015)

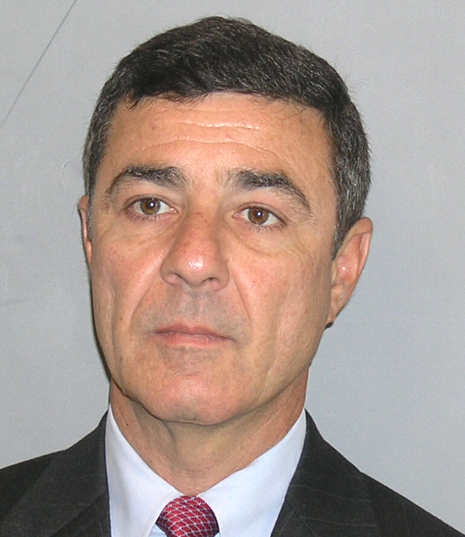
- DiPascali in a 2009 Department of Justice photograph
- Born: Frank DiPascali Jr. October 28, 1956; Queens, New York, U.S.
- Died: May 7, 2015 (aged 58)
- Education: courses at St. John's University, Brooklyn College
- Occupations: Director of options trading chief financial officer
- Employer: Bernard L. Madoff Investment Securities
- Known for: Ponzi scheme, director of options trading and chief financial officer of Bernard L. Madoff Investment Securities (prior)
- Spouse: JoAnne (married c. 1985)
- Status: Convicted, died before sentencing
- Criminal charges: conspiracy, securities fraud, investment advisor fraud, mail fraud, wire fraud, perjury, income tax evasion, international money laundering, falsifying books and records of a broker-dealer, and falsifying books and records of an investment advisor

Frank DiPascali Jr. (October 28, 1956 – May 7, 2015) was an American fraudster and financier who was a key lieutenant of Bernie Madoff for three decades. He referred to himself as the company's "director of options trading" and as "chief financial officer". For a number of years, he played a key part in the daily operation of the Madoff investment scandal, later recounting how he helped manipulate billions of dollars in account statements so clients would believe that they were creating wealth for them.

On August 11, 2009, he pleaded guilty to ten counts related to the fraud. He subsequently admitted that he had known for at least two decades that Madoff had turned his investment advisory business into a massive Ponzi scheme. He was denied bail before sentencing and spent ten months in jail before being released. He died of lung cancer in 2015 while awaiting sentencing.

== Personal life ==
DiPascali grew up next door to Annette Bongiorno, Madoff's longtime assistant, in Queens' Howard Beach neighborhood. She recruited him to work for Madoff. DiPascali graduated from Archbishop Molloy High School in Queens, New York, in 1974, and joined Madoff's firm in 1975, ultimately rising to be CFO. According to him, he was enrolled at St. John's University and Brooklyn College. DiPascali and his wife, JoAnne, lived in a five-bedroom house, with a pool, on seven acres in Bridgewater Township, New Jersey, assessed at $1.38 million. They had three black Mercedes and an 18.5-meter (61-foot) Viking yacht, registered to Dorothy-Jo Sportfishing LLC.

DiPascali's brother-in-law, Robert Cardile, bought his former house in Bridgewater for $400,000. Cardile began working for Madoff in 1985, and responded to phone inquiries for DiPascali.

In January 2005, a tax lien of $77,479 by the IRS for the 1996 tax year was paid by DiPascali three months later. In 2000, New Jersey unpaid taxes of $72,943 were paid. In 1993, New York State Tax Commission filed an action for $21,685, which was also paid. DiPascali died from lung cancer on May 7, 2015, at the age of 58, while awaiting sentencing.

Financial journalist and Madoff biographer Erin Arvedlund describes DiPascali as an abrasive man who padded his resume.

== Career ==
DiPascali started at Madoff's investment-advisory business at age 18 in 1975, and eventually oversaw the company's day-to-day operations. He became the director of options in 1986, and CFO in 1996. He also claims to have been a director of Madoff Securities International Limited in London, but Companies House (the UK registrar of companies) has no record of him ever being appointed as a director of the company. He was the person many of Madoff's investors dealt with regarding their accounts. Madoff told investors DiPascali executed trades. However, a court-appointed trustee found that no trading had occurred for at least 13 years. Prosecutors have asked at least three employees, Eric Lipkin, JoAnn Crupi, and Robert Cardile, DiPascali's brother-in-law, about his role in the firm. Investors spoke to these other employees and would fax orders if they needed to withdraw money. DiPascali's name was sometimes given as an alternate contact.

DiPascali told investigators that on December 3, 2008, Madoff told him that he was finished. By then, due to a wave of redemption requests from skittish investors during the 2008 financial crisis, Madoff's business account at JPMorganChase was down to only $234 million–not even a fraction of what he needed to pay off outstanding redemptions. By this time, banks had all but stopped lending, and Madoff knew he could not hope to borrow enough money to meet that month's upcoming redemptions. He directed DiPascali to use the remaining balance to cash out the accounts of relatives and favored investors. When Madoff's sons told their lawyers about these checks, their lawyers told them to contact federal prosecutors and the SEC right away, setting the stage for Madoff's arrest on December 11.

== Criminal and civil complaints and guilty plea ==
According to an SEC memo, DiPascali "responded evasively" to questioning following Madoff's arrest.

DiPascali pleaded guilty on August 11, 2009, before federal judge Richard J. Sullivan to 10 federal criminal charges: conspiracy, securities fraud, investment advisor fraud, mail fraud, wire fraud, perjury, income tax evasion, international money laundering, falsifying books and records of a broker-dealer, and falsifying books and records of an investment advisor. In his allocution, he admitted that he had known for at least two decades that Madoff's investment advisory business was fraudulent; he had discovered at some point in the late 1980s or early 1990s that there was no actual trading occurring in Madoff's investment-advisory client accounts. About 2002, he set up an account for himself at the firm named after his fishing yacht, Dorothy Jo. Having never made a contribution, he withdrew more than $5 million. His salary and bonuses were over $2 million annually. He recounted how he, Madoff, and "other people" manipulated account statements, leading clients to believe that they were creating wealth for them. "No purchases or sales of securities were actually taking place in their accounts. It was all fake. It was all fictitious. It was wrong, and I knew it was wrong at the time." He had agreed to connect the dots and to name names while sentencing was anticipated in May 2010. He faced a maximum sentence of 125 years in federal prison. Prosecutors sought more than $170 billion in forfeiture, the same amount sought from Madoff, which represented funds deposited by investors and later disbursed to other investors. The same day, a Securities and Exchange Commission civil complaint was filed against DiPascali.

Prosecutors sought bail for DiPascali, but Sullivan remanded him to custody, saying he was a potential flight risk. At a bail hearing on October 28, 2009, Sullivan deferred a decision pending more information, though he added that he still had reason to believe DiPascali might flee to avoid the prospect of dying in prison. One of Madoff's victims, Laurence Leif, objected to bail, claiming it would only serve to further "torment" the victims. In February 2010, Sullivan approved a bail package that required DiPascali to post $10 million bond secured by nine friends and relatives. DiPascali was finally able to post bond on June 22, 2010; he was then released on house arrest and required to wear an ankle monitor.

He was represented by attorney Marc Mukasey, a son of former U.S. Attorney General Michael Mukasey. Mukasey said that while DiPascali was indeed guilty, he had long believed that Madoff would be able to repay his clients.

DiPascali's sentencing was delayed for almost six years while he cooperated with prosecutors. With his help, prosecutors were able to reconstruct the details of the massive fraud, recover billions of dollars in assets, and convict 15 others involved in the scandal. Notably, he was the star witness when Bongiorno and four others stood trial for knowingly helping Madoff and profiting from the Ponzi scheme.

== In the media ==
- DiPascali was portrayed by Michael Rispoli in the 2016 ABC miniseries Madoff.
- He was portrayed by Hank Azaria in the May 2017 HBO film The Wizard of Lies, based on the best-selling book by Diana B. Henriques.
- He was portrayed by Isa Camyar in the January 2023 RadicalMedia/Netflix 4-part documentary series Madoff: The Monster of Wall Street, based in part on the 2021 book "Madoff Talks" by Jim Campbell.

== See also ==
- Affinity fraud
- 2008 financial crisis
- Participants in the Madoff investment scandal
- Recovery of funds from the Madoff investment scandal
