= Clawback =

Mandatory return of money or benefits

Clawback or claw back is any money or benefits that have been given out, but are required to be returned (clawed back) due to special circumstances or events, such as the money having been received as the result of a financial crime, or where there is a clawback provision in the executive compensation contract.

In law, clawback is most commonly known as restitution.

== From government grantees ==
In the past, clawback phenomena have been used primarily in securing tax incentives, abatements, tax refunds, and grants. Clawbacks are distinguished from repayments or refunds as they involve a penalty, in addition to a repayment.

The use of tax incentives for attracting jobs and capital investment has grown over the past decades to include performance measures from which to gauge a company's growth. Typical measures are:

1. number of created jobs over 5
2. annual payroll;
3. amount of capital investment
4. amount of depreciated value .

More unusual measures are retaining a headquarters at a specific site for a period of time, amount of production increase or production cost decrease per unit, or the requirement to bring a given technology to a commercial market. The recipient will be required to return the monetary value of the incentive plus a penalty and/or interest to the grantor of the incentive, usually a local or state taxing authority. As the use of incentives mature over time, it is sometimes alleged that the triggering of clawbacks for non-performance will likely become more ubiquitous.

Clawbacks can be understood to be the contractual elements that stand between the drive for economic development and community development and the slippery slope of corporate welfare. They are highly controversial and are utilized as community-based guarantees for some expectation of performance. The site location industry normally tries to eliminate or reduce any such promises as part of their negotiations.

== From employees ==
=== Clawback provision ===
A clawback provision is a contractual clause typically included in employment contracts by financial firms, by which money already paid to an employee must be paid back to the employer under certain conditions.

The employees' bonuses are, in a clawback scheme, tied specifically to the performance (or lack thereof) of the financial product(s) the individual(s) may have created and/or sold as part of his or her job expecting a high profit. If the product does indeed do well over a long period of time, and permanently improves the nature of the firm, the bonuses paid to the individual are allowed to be retained by the individual. However, if the product fails, and damages the nature of the firm—even years down the line from the product's inception—then the firm has the right to revoke, reclaim, or otherwise repossess some or all of the bonus amount(s). However, research shows managers who are subject to clawback provisions that are newly in place in a company often try to offset their increased risk of bonus clawback by demanding an increase in base salary that is not subject to being clawed back.

The prevalence of clawback provisions among Fortune 100 companies increased from lower than 3% prior to 2005, to 82% in 2010. The growing popularity of clawback provisions is likely, at least in part, due to the Sarbanes–Oxley Act of 2002, which requires the U.S. Securities and Exchange Commission (SEC) to pursue the repayment of incentive compensation from senior executives who are involved in a fraud. In practice, the Securities and Exchange Commission has enforced its clawback powers in only a small number of cases.

The Dodd–Frank Act of 2010 mandates that the SEC require that U.S. public companies include a clawback provision in their executive compensation contracts that is triggered by any accounting restatement, regardless of fault (whereas the clawback provisions per the Sarbanes–Oxley Act only applied to intentional fraud). As of mid-2015, this portion of the Dodd–Frank Act had yet to be implemented.

=== Faithless servant clawback ===
Under the faithless servant doctrine, an employee who commits a crime in his work or fails to follow the company code of conduct or code of ethics is subject to having all of his compensation clawed back by the employer. In Morgan Stanley v. Skowron, 989 F. Supp. 2d 356 (S.D.N.Y. 2013), applying New York's faithless servant doctrine, the court held that a hedge fund's portfolio manager engaging in insider trading in violation of his company's code of conduct, which also required him to report his misconduct, must repay his employer the full $31 million his employer paid him as compensation during his period of faithlessness. The court called the insider trading the "ultimate abuse of a portfolio manager's position." The judge also wrote: "In addition to exposing Morgan Stanley to government investigations and direct financial losses, Skowron's behavior damaged the firm's reputation, a valuable corporate asset."

=== Implications ===
The usual objective of a clawback provision is to deter managers from publishing incorrect accounting information. Academic research finds that voluntarily adopted clawback provisions appear to be effective at reducing both intentional and unintentional accounting errors. The same study also finds that investors have greater confidence in a firm's financial statements after clawback adoption, and that boards of directors place greater weight on accounting numbers in executive bonuses after a clawback is in place (i.e., pay for performance sensitivity increases).

According to a December 2010 New Yorker magazine article, the clawback phenomenon pursued by banks and other financial groups directly and/or indirectly responsible for the 2008 financial crisis has been used by the chief administrators of those institutions in order to make the case that they are taking tangible self-corrective action to both prevent another crisis (by supposedly dis-incentivizing the sorts of shady investment-product behavior displayed by their people in the past) and to appropriately punish any potential future activity of a similar sort. However, some professional economists have argued that it is unlikely that either result will become the case, and that employee clawbacks are better seen as a public relations tactic until the impact of the 2008 financial crisis fades and similar abuses of the financial system can resume, with minimal or no detection by outside forces.

=== Notable cases ===
In the United States, clawbacks were rarely used until 2006. Major cases included a $600 million clawback affecting William W. McGuire of UnitedHealth Group, $500 million affecting Dennis Kozlowski of Tyco, and in 2019 clawbacks of compensation for the former CEO of Wells Fargo John Stumpf as well as a colleague.

== From investors ==
Clawback lawsuits in US courts, especially from innocent individuals and entities who profited from financial crimes of others, have increased in the years since 2000.

The yearslong clawback undertaken after the Madoff investment scandal, which attempted to transfer money back from the financial winners to the financial losers among those who had invested in Bernie Madoff's Ponzi scheme, is notable both for the size and success of the operation. A team of lawyers headed by Irving Picard were able to recover over $13 billion, or about 75%, of the estimated $19 billion collectively lost by investors, and transfer it back to those investors who had claimed losses. This was a far higher percentage than the usual recovery rate for investor clawbacks, which typically ranges from 5 to 30 percent. Of the recovered money, $7.2 billion came from the estate of just one investor, Jeffry Picower; it was the largest civil forfeiture payment in U.S. history.

== Other clawback types ==
Clawback provisions are also used in bankruptcy matters where insiders may have raided assets prior to a filing. The aim of the clause is to secure an option for an employer or trustee to limit bonuses, compensation, or other remuneration in case of catastrophic shifts in business, bankruptcy, and national crisis such as the 2008 financial crisis.

== In various countries ==
Italy and the Netherlands have several clawback regimes, and there are two clawback regimes in the United Kingdom. The French clawback regime is limited. In Belgium, their enforceability is unclear.
