= Tremont Group =

U.S. hedge fund

- Company type: Hedge fund
- Industry: Asset Management
- Founded: 1985
- Founder: Sandra Manzke
- Headquarters: Rye, New York, U.S.
- Services: Hedge fund group
- Parent: Massachusetts Mutual Life Insurance Company
- Divisions: Rye Investment Management
- Website: tremont.com

Tremont Group Holdings, Inc., a Delaware corporation headquartered in Rye, New York, is a hedge fund group with a subsidiary that advised a feeder fund to Bernard Madoff's investment advisory firm in the Madoff investment scandal. This was the second-largest feeder fund to Madoff's firm due to the group having had a long professional relationship with him as Chairman of the NASD, the precursor to FINRA, and as the largest options market maker on the NASDAQ.The firm was one of the largest hedge fund consultants and advisors globally during the seminal 1990's period and pioneered a number of ground breaking products such as the CSFB Tremont Hedge Fund Index, specialized products and venues for hedge fund investment; structured products, insurance entities, new markets and jurisdictions including the first institutional fund of hedge funds in Korea and the foundation of The Bermuda Stock exchange. Prominent board members and shareholders included; Mario Gabelli of Gabelli Asset Management, Leon Cooperman of Omega Advisors and Arthur Samberg of Pequot Capital Management. Tremont was among the first investors and/or involved in the launch or restructuring of numerous legendary funds such as; S.A.C., Quantum and AQR.

== History ==
Tremont Group was founded in 1985 by money manager Sandra Manzke, who was its chief executive officer from May 1994 to August 2000, and co-CEO until 2005. It owns Tremont Partners and Tremont Capital Management (formerly Tremont Advisers), a consultant, advisor and hedge fund of funds. Tremont Holdings also has offices in London, Toronto, and Hong Kong. Its subsidiaries are regulated by the U.S.'s Securities and Exchange Commission and National Association of Securities Dealers, the U.K.'s Financial Services Authority, the Ontario Securities Commission, and the Hong Kong Securities and Futures Commission.The firm previously partly owned Tremont International Insurance and Tremont Bermuda Ltd.

Tremont Group invested with Madoff starting in 1997 via its Rye Investment Management division, headquartered in Rye, New York. Tremont Group closed the Rye Investment Management division in January 2009.

Massachusetts Mutual Life Insurance Company's Oppenheimer Funds Inc. unit paid $140 million to purchase Tremont from Manzke in 2001. Manzke left Tremont in 2005.

In January 2006, Rupert A. Allan became President of Tremont Group. In June 2007, he was also named CEO of Tremont Group, replacing Schulman, who remained chairman of Tremont Group until his retirement in July 2008.

=== Madoff scheme fallout ===
The hedge fund lost $3.3 billion, representing more than half its assets, in the Madoff investment scandal.

When the scheme was uncovered in December 2008, Brad Alford, who runs Alpha Capital Management LLC, which helps clients choose hedge funds, said:

It's mind-boggling that people like Tremont ... had been doing this for so long. It's the job of these funds of funds to be doing due diligence. That's why they get paid.

=== Madoff scheme litigation ===
In April 2010, Judge Thomas Griesa, of the U.S. District Court for the Southern District of New York dismissed a lawsuit by Tremont Group investors against Tremont's auditor, KPMG, which charged that KPMG had failed to discover the fraud in its audits of Tremont and was therefore liable to the investor. Judge Griesa held that KPMG could not be sued, because there was no intent to deceive. He wrote: "Merely alleging that the auditor had access to the information by which it could have discovered the fraud is not sufficient."

In December 2010, Irving Picard, the court-appointed trustee in the Madoff bankruptcy, sued Tremont for over $3 billion in customer money that Tremont lost by investing with Madoff. The lawsuit alleged that Tremont failed to perform independent, reasonable, and meaningful due diligence of Madoff. In July 2011, Tremont Group agreed to settle the lawsuit by paying a $1 billion cash settlement.

== See also ==
- List of investors in Bernard L. Madoff Securities
