= Stanley Chais =

American financial advisor (1926–2010)

- Born: March 27, 1926; Bronx, New York, US
- Died: September 26, 2010 (aged 84); Manhattan, New York, US
- Education: Syracuse University
- Occupations: Investment advisor, money manager, and philanthropist
- Known for: Operated "feeder funds" which collected money for funds related to the Madoff investment scandal; his widow, family, and estate settled with Madoff trustee Irving Picard in 2016 for $277 million.
- Spouse: Pamela Chais
- Children: 3

Stanley Chais (March 27, 1926 – September 26, 2010) was an American investment advisor, money manager, and philanthropist. He operated "feeder funds" which collected money for funds related to the Madoff investment scandal. The widow, family, and estate of Chais settled with Madoff trustee Irving Picard in 2016 for $277 million.

== Early and personal life ==
Chais was born to a Jewish family in the Bronx, New York. He attended Syracuse University, graduating in 1947.

He was married to Pamela Chais, a playwright and screenwriter. They resided with their three children first in Sands Point, New York, and then in Beverly Hills and West Hollywood, California. After the scandal, they moved to Manhattan, New York.

== Involvement in Madoff's Ponzi scheme ==
Chais was an investment advisor, money manager, and philanthropist. He operated "feeder funds" which collected money for funds related to the Madoff investment scandal. He operated three funds that offered returns of up to 25%. He told clients that he achieved the returns using a complex combination of derivatives, stock, currency and futures trading. Instead, the funds were merely funneled into Madoff's Ponzi scheme.

On May 1, 2009, Irving Picard, bankruptcy trustee for Madoff Securities, filed a lawsuit against Stanley Chais. The complaint alleged he "knew or should have known" he was deep in a Ponzi scheme when his family investments with Madoff averaged 40% and sometimes soared as high as 300%. It also claimed Chais was a primary beneficiary of the scheme for at least 30 years, allowing his family to withdraw more than $1 billion from their accounts since 1995 - money that properly belonged to Madoff victims. The case number was Picard v. Chais, 09–01172. When Chais claimed to be broke, Picard told a judge that Chais should sell his Fifth Avenue New York apartment to pay his legal fees. On June 22, 2009, the Securities and Exchange Commission filed civil fraud charges against Chais. On September 23, 2009, California Attorney General Jerry Brown filed a lawsuit against Chais seeking $25 million in penalties and restitution for victims. Federal prosecutors had opened a criminal probe into him, but he died in September 2010 before they filed charges against him. His lawyer denied that Chais committed any wrongdoing.

=== Settlement with Picard ===
The widow, children, family, and estate of Chais settled with Picard in 2016 for $277 million. On November 19, 2016, the United States Bankruptcy Court for the Southern District of New York approved a global settlement – made in cooperation with the California Attorney General - with the defendants in Picard v. the Estate of Stanley Chais, et al. The agreement was made with the Stanley Chais estate, Chais's widow, children, and a number of other Chais family members, investment funds, trusts, companies, and other entities associated with Chais. Under the terms of the agreement, the BLMIS Customer Fund received $277 million, including a cash payment of $258.47 million, as well as the assignment of other assets that would be liquidated over time. All proceeds of the settlement were to go to the BLMIS Customer Fund for the benefit of BLMIS customers with allowed claims. Picard's lawyers said the settlement covered all of Chais’ estate and substantially all of his widow's assets, and represented “a good faith, complete and total compromise.”

== Philanthropy ==
Chais founded the Chais Family Foundation, which donated extensively to organizations that preserve and further Jewish history and culture, from reestablishing and maintaining Jewish culture in areas where it was diminished by the Holocaust and by Soviet policy, to Israeli organizations. In Israel, Chais sat on the boards of Technion, the Weizmann Institute, and Hebrew University of Jerusalem. The foundation, which had been funded through the Madoff scam, collapsed in December 2008.

== Death ==
He suffered from profound anemia. Chais died on September 26, 2010, at age 84 in Manhattan, where he and his wife went for treatment of the myelodysplastic syndrome which eventually took his life.
