= Ascot Partners =

Hedge fund

- Company type: hedge fund
- Key people: J. Ezra Merkin, general partner
- Services: feeder fund to Bernie Madoff

Ascot Partners is a hedge fund that was a feeder fund to Bernie Madoff.

It is headed by money manager and financier J. Ezra Merkin as general partner. It was managed by Gabriel Capital Corporation, of which Merkin was chairman. Among its investors were Yeshiva University and New York University.

The hedge fund lost $1.8 billion in the Bernie Madoff Ponzi scheme.

== See also ==
- List of investors in Bernard L. Madoff Securities
