= Securities Investor Protection Act =

The Securities Investor Protection Act of 1970 is the U.S. federal law that established the Securities Investor Protection Corporation (SIPC). It was enacted by the 91st United States Congress and signed into law by Richard Nixon on December 30, 1970. Most brokers and dealers registered under the Securities Exchange Act of 1934 are required to be members of the SIPC.

The SIPC maintains a fund that is intended to protect investors against the misappropriation of their funds and of most types of securities in the event of the failure of their broker.
