= Irving Picard =

American lawyer (born 1941)

Irving Hermann Picard
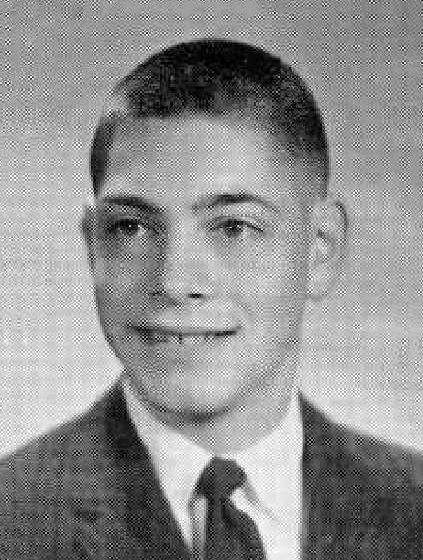
- High school yearbook portrait, 1959
- Born: June 26, 1941 (age 85); Fall River, Massachusetts, U.S.
- Education: University of Pennsylvania (BS) Boston University (JD); New York University (LLM)
- Occupation: Attorney
- Employer: BakerHostetler
- Known for: Recovery of funds from the Madoff investment scandal

Irving Hermann Picard (born June 26, 1941) is an American lawyer known for his recovery of funds from the Madoff investment scandal from investors, Bernie Madoff and his family, and their spouses and estates. Throughout the case, Picard's law firm, BakerHostetler, was paid approximately $1 billion.

== Early life ==
Picard was born in Fall River, Massachusetts, and is Jewish. His parents were Julius Picard (a doctor born in Lauterbourg, France) and Claire Dreyfuss (born in Kaiserslautern, Germany).

In August 1938, Julius and Claire Picard immigrated with their children from Mainz in Nazi Germany to the United States. They settled in Fall River, where their third son, Irving, was born. Irving's uncle Moritz Cahn, a lawyer in Frankfurt/Main, Germany, committed suicide, with his wife, in 1941 to avoid the concentration camps.

== Education and legal career ==
Picard graduated from the University of Pennsylvania with a B.S. degree in Economics (1963) from Boston University School of Law with a J.D. degree (1966), and from the New York University School of Law with an LL.M. degree (1967).

In the 1970s, he was variously Assistant General Counsel, Acting Chief Counsel, and Trial Attorney in the Division of Corporate Regulation of the Securities and Exchange Commission. He was admitted to the New York Bar in 1982, and has been in private practice since then. He joined the law firm of BakerHostetler as a partner in 2008.

=== Recovery of funds from Madoff scandal ===
In 2008, U.S. District Judge of the Southern District of New York Lawrence McKenna appointed Picard trustee of assets seized by the court from Bernard Madoff. Since then, Picard has led the recovery of funds from the Madoff investment scandal. He and his team have been overseeing the liquidation of Bernard Madoff's firm in bankruptcy court, and have so far recovered over $13 billion — about 76 percent of approved claims — by suing those who profited from the scheme even if those individuals were unaware or uncharged.

Kathy Bazoian Phelps, a lawyer at Diamond McCarthy, said "That kind of recovery is extraordinary and atypical", as clawbacks in such schemes range from 5 percent to 30 percent, and many victims do not get anything. Picard has successfully pursued not only investors, but also spouses and estates of those who profited, such as the widow and estate of the deceased Stanley Chais, and the widow and estate of the deceased Jeffry Picower, with whom he reached a $7.2 billion settlement (the largest civil forfeiture payment in US history). His most notable case was Ruth Madoff, the wife of Bernard Madoff. "You don't take this job if you're thin-skinned", Picard once said.

Madoff victim Maureen Ebel has described the legal efforts to recover funds from investors as distressing, noting that some victims were forced to sell their homes due to the clawbacks. She wrote that, although she was not personally subject to a clawback suit because she had withdrawn little money, she found the process unsettling and unfair. Some investors like Ebel eventually sold their claims to third-party firms known as claims traders or distressed-debt investors, who purchased the rights to future recoveries for a fraction of their value.
