= Feeder fund =

Type of investment fund

A feeder fund is an investment fund which does almost all of its investments through a master fund via a master-feeder relationship.

It is a situation similar to a fund of funds, except that the master fund performs all the investments.

== Structure and purpose ==
In a master-feeder structure, a feeder fund does not generally invest directly in individual securities. Instead, it invests substantially all of its assets in a master fund, which then makes the underlying portfolio investments.

SEC materials describing master-feeder arrangements state that this structure allows the assets of multiple feeder funds to be pooled in a single master fund, which may create economies of scale and portfolio-management efficiencies compared with having each feeder fund invest separately.

== Sources ==
- Feeder funds
- Investopedia, James Chen, April 30, 2018: https://www.investopedia.com/terms/f/feederfund.asp
