= Charles Murphy (hedge fund manager) =

American finance executive (1961–2017)

- Born: March 23, 1961; New York City, New York, U.S.
- Died: March 27, 2017 (aged 55); New York City, New York, U.S.
- Education: Columbia University (BA); Harvard University (JD); Massachusetts Institute of Technology (MBA)
- Occupation: Hedge Fund Manager
- Employer: Paulson & Co.

Charles W. Murphy (March 23, 1961 – March 27, 2017) was an American investor and hedge fund manager and has been referred to in media reports as a "financial guru".

== Early life and education ==
Charles W. Murphy was born on March 23, 1961, to a middle-class New York family. He grew up in New York City and attended Hunter Elementary School and Stuyvesant High School. He graduated with a B.A. from Columbia University, where he was a member of the starting varsity crew team, earned a Juris Doctor degree from Harvard University, and an MBA from the Massachusetts Institute of Technology.

== Career ==
Murphy began his career at Goldman Sachs (1985–1990) then joined Morgan Stanley as a managing director in the Financial Institutions Group (1990–2000). After ten years at Morgan Stanley he moved to London where he led the Financial Institutions Group at Deutsche Bank (2001–2005) and then at Credit Suisse (2005–2007).

Murphy also worked at Fairfield Greenwich, which had invested more than $7 billion in the notorious Madoff Ponzi scheme. Murphy was unaware the firm was being victimized by Madoff. Murphy joined investment firm Paulson & Co. in 2009. He rose to the level of Partner. While there, he led many successful investments, including help organize the firm's activist push to break up American International Group.

== Personal life ==
Murphy owned a 19th-century, 11,550-square-foot home in New York that he purchased in 2007 for $33 million, a record price at the time, from Seagram heir Matthew Bronfman. In 2016, Murphy listed the property for sale for $49.5 million. In April 2018 Murphy's widow, Annabella Murphy, sold the seven-story home for $28.5 million.

At the time of his death, Murphy was married to his second wife Annabella Murphy and had five children.

== Death ==
Murphy died on Monday March 27, 2017 at the age of 56 after falling, dressed in a suit, from the 24th floor of the Sofitel Hotel in midtown Manhattan. Three weeks before his death, Murphy added his wife, Annabella to the deed of their home, giving her sole ownership of the property, which suggests Murphy may have planned his death in advance.

Murphy was being treated for depression by a psychiatrist and was taking anti-depressants at the time of his death.
