= Hyposwiss Private Bank =

Hyposwiss Private Bank Ltd (Zurich)
- Company type: private bank
- Industry: Financial industry
- Predecessor: Schweizerische Hypothekenban
- Founded: Switzerland, 1889; 137 years ago
- Headquarters: Zurich, Switzerland
- Services: private banking, wealth management, financial planning, and investment advice
- AUM: CHF 9.748 billion (Swiss Francs) under management (2011)

Hyposwiss Private Bank Ltd was a Swiss private bank, located in Zurich, that closed in 2013.

Both banks had the same shareholders from 2008 until 2013.

== History ==
Hyposwiss was founded in 1889 as Schweizerische Hypothekenbank. In 1988 Union Bank of Switzerland, which later became UBS, took it over, and in 2002 St.Galler Kantonalbank (SGKB) acquired it and it changed its name to Hyposwiss Private Bank Ltd. In 2008, SGKB acquired Anglo Irish Bank (Suisse) SA and adopted a new corporate name for the Geneva entity: Hyposwiss Private Bank Genève SA. The two entities have always remained independent.

Hyposwiss Private Bank Ltd services included private banking, wealth management, financial planning, and investment advice.

It is the private banking centre in the St. Galler Kantonalbank Group, a regional bank based in St. Gallen, Switzerland.

In December 2008, it had $50 million invested with Bernard Madoff, which was around 0.14 percent of the bank's 40 billion Swiss francs (US $34.19 billion) in assets under management. Its parent company said it was not hurt by the exposure of Hyposwiss to the Madoff fraud. In December 2010, Irving Picard, trustee of assets seized by the court from Bernard Madoff, sued Hyposwiss, asserting that its managers ignored warnings that the Madoff investments were in fact fraudulent.

In June 2011, it reappointed to its board of directors Dr. Hans Bodmer, a lawyer who had pleaded guilty to money laundering in 2004 in Manhattan. In November 2011, Bodmer resigned.

In 2011, it had client assets of 9.748 billion CHF.

In June 2013, it was reported that St.Galler Kantonalbank was selling part of Hyposwiss Private Bank Ltd (Zurich) to different buyers and integrating the remainder, to strengthen its core business and reduce business risks.

== Hyposwiss Private Bank Genève SA ==
Hyposwiss Private Bank Genève SA, an independent entity owned by St.Galler Kantonalbank in 2008, has been sold at the same time to Mirelis InvesTrust SA. Hyposwiss Private Bank Genève SA is the only entity allowed to use the brand name "Hyposwiss" since 2013.

Hyposwiss Private Bank Genève SA announced the acquisition of the clients’ assets of IDB (Swiss) Bank Ltd on 23 November 2015.

== See also ==
- List of investors in Bernard L. Madoff Securities
