= List of investors in Bernard L. Madoff Investment Securities =

Investors in Bernard L. Madoff Investment Securities LLC lost billions of dollars in the Madoff investment scandal, a Ponzi scheme conducted by Bernard Madoff. The amount missing from client accounts, over two thirds of which were fabricated gains, was almost $65 billion. The court-appointed trustee Irving Picard estimated actual losses to investors at $18 billion, and much of that money has been returned.

The 162-page list of clients (without investment amount), filed in United States bankruptcy court in Manhattan, was made public on February 4, 2009. Some of the clients profited. Thousands of individual investors of Fairfield Greenwich, J. Ezra Merkin's Ascot Partners, and Chais Investments are not included.

Several newspapers and news services, including Bloomberg News, The New York Times (NYT), and The Wall Street Journal (WSJ), compiled lists of these investors during the first few months of the scandal, including fabricated gains in the amounts lost. These lists may include double-counting; for example, they may count investments by feeder funds into Madoff Securities, as well as investments made into the feeder funds.

Madoff investor	Investor type	Potential exposure	Source
Fairfield Sentry (Fairfield Greenwich Group)	US investment firm; Madoff feeder fund	$7,500 million	(firm statement) WSJ
Grupo Santander	Spanish bank	$3,500 million	El País
Kingate Management	Bermuda hedge fund; Madoff feeder fund	$3,500 million	Bloomberg
Rye Investment Management (Tremont Group)	US hedge fund; Madoff feeder fund	$3,100 million	WSJ
Bank Medici of Austria	Austrian bank	$2,800 million	Bloomberg
Ascot Partners	US hedge fund; Madoff feeder fund	$1,800 million	WSJ
Access International Advisors	US hedge fund; Madoff feeder fund	$1,400 million	Bloomberg
Fortis Bank Nederland	Dutch Bank	$1,350 million	firm statement; WSJ
Thema Fund	Irish hedge fund; Madoff feeder fund	$1,100 million	media reports
HSBC	British bank	$1,000 million	firm statement; WSJ
Genevalor Benbassat & Cie	Swiss bank; Madoff feeder fund	$935 million	Le Temps
Aurelia Finance	Swiss bank; Madoff feeder fund	$800 million	Le Temps
Union Bancaire Privée	Swiss bank	$700 million	WSJ
Natixis	French bank	$600 million	Bloomberg
Royal Bank of Scotland	British bank	$600 million	media reports
Sterling Equities	investment firm	$500 million	New York Post
BNP Paribas	French bank	$475.3 million	Bloomberg
BBVA	Spanish bank	$404 million	Reuters
Fix Asset Management	US alternatives firm	$400 million	firm statement
Ruth and Carl J. Shapiro	US individuals	$400 million	WSJ
RMF (Man Group)	UK hedge fund	$360 million	firm statement; WSJ
Nomura	Japanese broker	$358.9 million	WSJ
Reichmuth Matterhorn	Swiss private bank	$330 million	Bloomberg
Normal Holdings		$302 million	StreetInsider.com
Pioneer Alternative Investments	Irish alternatives firm	$280 million	Bloomberg
Maxam Capital Management	US fund of hedge funds; Madoff feeder fund	$280 million	WSJ
J.P. Jeanneret Associates	investment adviser	$250 million	The Post Standard (www.syracuse.com)
EIM Group	European bank	$230 million	Le Temps/WSJ
Ira Rennert	US individual	$200 million	FINalternatives
Bank Austria	Austrian bank	$192.1 million	Der Standard
Ulatan Holdings Inc (UGI Capital Fund)	Family Office Holdings	$191.6 million	WSJ
Tremont Capital Management (Tremont Group)	US fund of hedge funds	$190 million	firm statement
M&B Capital Advisers	Spanish money manager	$187.9 million	El Mundo
Jerome Fisher (Nine West founder)	individual	$150 million	media reports
Carl and Ruth Shapiro Family Foundation	charity	$145 million	The Boston Globe
Yeshiva University	US Jewish university endowment	$140 million	Bloomberg
Aozora Bank	Japanese bank	$137 million	WSJ
Axa	French insurer	less than $135 million	Reuters
Crédit Mutuel	French bank	$124 million	Bloomberg
Dexia	Franco-Belgian bank	$106.9 million	firm statement
UniCredit	Italian financial firm	$100 million	Bloomberg
Hadassah	Jewish charity	$90 million	WSJ
Unione di Banche Italiane	Italian bank	$84.9 million	Bloomberg
Nordea	Swedish bank	$65 million	Reuters
Hyposwiss Private Bank Genève	Swiss private bank	$50 million	Reuters; WSJ
Korea Life Insurance Co.	Korean insurer	$50 million	Yonhap News
Banque Benedict Hentsch	Swiss private bank	$47.5 million	firm statement
Royal Dutch Shell	Anglo-Dutch pension	$45 million	Reuters
Almus Capital	US Family Office	$42.4 million	Reuters
Town of Fairfield, Connecticut	US pension fund	$42 million	WSJ
Royal Bank of Canada	Canadian bank	$40.4 million	The Globe and Mail
Wolosoff Foundation	charity	$38 million	FINalternatives
Bramdean Asset Management	asset manager	$31.2 million	WSJ
Mortimer B. Zuckerman Charitable Remainder Trust (New York Daily News owner's charity)	US charity	$30 million	CNBC
Arthur I. and Sydelle F. Meyer Charitable Foundation	charity	$29.2 million	The Palm Beach Post
Chris Lighty	individual	$23 million	Boston Herald
Sumitomo Life Insurance Co.	Japanese insurer	$22 million	WSJ
Madoff Family Foundation	Bernard Madoff's Charity	$19 million	WSJ
Los Angeles Jewish Community Foundation	Jewish charity	$18 million	WSJ
Foundation for Humanity (Elie Wiesel's charity)	charity	$15.2 million	WSJ
America-Israel Cultural Foundation	US-Israeli charity	$15 million	NYT
KSM Capital Advisors	investment firm	$15 million	Indianapolis Business Journal
The Phoenix Holdings	Israeli financial services company	$15 million	firm statement
Harel Insurance Investments and Financial Services	Israeli insurer	$14.2 million	WSJ
Alicia Koplowitz	individual	$13.7 million	Europa Press
Groupama	French Insurer	$13.6 million	firm statement
Société Générale	French bank	less than $13.5 million	Reuters
Bâloise	Swiss insurer	$13 million	WSJ
Lautenberg Family Foundation	charity	$12.8 million	media reports
Crédit Agricole	French bank	less than $12.32 million	WSJ
KAS Bank	bank	$12.3 million	firm statement
Marion and Elie Wiesel	US individuals	$12 million	WSJ
Massachusetts Pension Reserves Investment Management	US pension	$12 million	Reuters
Mitsubishi UFJ Financial Group	Japanese financial institution	$11 million	Bloomberg
Hampshire County Council	pension	$10.7 million	IPE
PWA Asset Holding Joint Trust	US individual	$10.5 million	WSJ
United Jewish Endowment Fund	Jewish charity	less than $10 million	JTA
Banco Popolare	Italian bank	$9.86 million	WSJ
Korea Teachers Pension	Korean pension	$9.1 million	WSJ
Robert I. Lappin Charitable Foundation	Jewish charity	$8 million	The Washington Post
Chais Family Foundation	Jewish charity	$7 million	WSJ
Jewish Federation of Greater Los Angeles	Jewish charity	$6.4 million	media reports
Technion – Israel Institute of Technology	Israeli university	$6.4 million	Globes
Vincent Tchenguiz	British individual	$6.3 million	FINalternatives
The Ramaz School	Jewish school	$6 million	WSJ
Irwin Kellner (named plaintiff on first lawsuit against Madoff)	individual	$6 million	lawsuit
Julian J. Levitt Foundation	Jewish charity	$6 million	WSJ
North Shore-Long Island Jewish Health System	US pension fund	$5.7 million	WSJ
Stony Brook University Foundation	US university endowment	$5.4 million	Bloomberg
Maimonides School (Boston)	Jewish school	$5 million	Bloomberg
Neue Privat Bank	Swiss bank	$5 million	WSJ
Congregation Kehilath Jeshurun (New York)	synagogue	$3.5 million	WSJ
Dorset County Pension Fund	UK pension	$3.5 million	LocalGov.co.uk
Almus Real Estate Investments	individual	$3.4 million	firm statement
Clal Insurance	Israeli insurer	$3.1 million	WSJ
New York Law School	US law school	$3 million	lawsuit
Swiss Reinsurance Co.	Swiss reinsurer	$3 million	WSJ
Global Specialised Opportunities 1	Bermuda fund	$2.8 million	fund statement
Larry King	U.S. individual	$2.8 million	GQ
Banca March	Spanish Bank	$2.5 million	Cinco Días
American Friends of Yad Sarah	Jewish charity	$1.5 million	WSJ
Caisse des dépôts et consignations	French bank	$1.38 million	Bloomberg
SAR Academy (New York)	US school	$1.2 million	Bloomberg News
Harold Roitenberg	US individual	$1 million	Minneapolis Star-Tribune
Allegretto Fund	Hedge fund	$790,000	firm statement
Mediobanca	Italian bank	$671,000	WSJ
Stanford Financial Group	international financial services firm that managed a Ponzi scheme separate from the Madoff Ponzi scheme	$600,000 (£400,000)	The Times
Allianz Global Investors	German investment firm	n/a	Citywire
Austin Capital Management	fund of hedge funds	n/a	Reuters
AWD	financial services provider	n/a	Citywire
Kevin Bacon and Kyra Sedgwick (actors)	US actors	n/a	New York magazine
Banesto	Spanish bank	n/a	Reuters
Ed Blumenfeld (Long Island real estate developer)	US individual	n/a	Long Island Business News
Norman Braman (former Philadelphia Eagles' owner)	US individual	n/a	WSJ
Chair Family Foundation	US charity	n/a	FINalternatives
Erste Bank	Austrian bank	n/a	Der Standard
Fair Food Foundation	US charity	n/a	Crain's Detroit Business
Leonard Feinstein (Bed Bath & Beyond co-founder)	US individual	n/a	Newark Star-Ledger
Avram and Carol Goldberg (Stop n Shop founders)	US individuals	n/a	Reuters
Joyce Z. Greenberg (donor to Jewish cultural programs)	individual	n/a	Houston Chronicle
Bank Gutmann AG	Austrian bank	n/a	Citywire
members of the Hillcrest Country Club (Saint Paul, Minnesota)	US club	n/a	Star-Tribune
INTAC Global Preservation Hedge Portfolio (via Rye Investment Management)	fund of hedge funds	n/a	fund documents
JEHT Foundation	US charity	n/a	foundation statement
Henry Kaufman (former chief economist at Salomon Brothers)	US individual	n/a	WSJ
KBC Bank	Belgian bank	n/a	firm statement
Sandy Koufax	US individual	n/a	Associated Press
Knowsley MBC	public sector pension	n/a	LocalGov.co.uk
Rodger Krouse (co-founder of private equity firm Sun Capital Partners)	US individual	n/a	The New York Times
Last Atlantis Capital Management	fund of hedge funds	n/a	fund documents
Leonard Litwin	US individual	n/a	Bloomberg
Liverpool City Council	UK pension	n/a	LocalGov.co.uk
LLBW	German bank	n/a	Citywire
Mirabaud	bank	n/a	Le Temps
The Moriah Fund	charity	n/a	FINalternatives
MorseLife	charity	n/a	Palm Beach Post
Notz, Stucki & Cie	Swiss bank	n/a	Le Temps
Members of the Oak Ridge Country Club (Hopkins, MN)	US individuals	n/a	Star-Tribune
Optimal Investment Services (Grupo Santander)	alternatives firm	n/a	Bloomberg
Palm Beach Country Club	US country club	n/a	CNBC
Eric Roth (screenwriter)	US individual	n/a	Los Angeles Times
St. Helens MBC	UK pension	n/a	LocalGov.co.uk
Sefton MBC	UK pension	n/a	LocalGov.co.uk
SNS Reaal Groep	Dutch financial services firm	n/a	Bloomberg
Family of former New York Governor Eliot Spitzer	US individuals	n/a	Clusterstock.com
Symphony Fund (via Pioneer Alternative Investments)	fund of hedge funds	n/a	fund documents
Jeff Tucker (Stone Bridge horse farm owner, Fairfield Greenwich Group founding partner)	US individual	n/a	WNYT television
Thyssen family	family office	n/a	Clusterstock.com
UBS	Swiss bank	n/a	Reuters
Lawrence Velvel (Dean Emeritus, Massachusetts Law School)	US individual	n/a	WSJ
Wilpon family (New York Mets owner)	family office	n/a	WSJ
Wunderkinder Foundation (Steven Spielberg's charity)	charity	n/a	WSJ
Shusaku Arakawa and Madeline Gins	US couple	n/a	WSJ
