= Union Bancaire Privée =

Private bank and finance firm in Switzerland

- Company type: Joint-stock company
- Industry: Financial services
- Founded: 1969; 57 years ago
- Founder: Edgar de Picciotto
- Headquarters: Geneva, Switzerland
- Area served: Worldwide
- Key people: Daniel de Picciotto (Chairman); Guy de Picciotto (CEO)
- Products: Private banking Asset management Alternative investments
- AUM: CHF 184.5 billion
- Number of employees: 2,667
- Website: www.ubp.com

Union Bancaire Privée (UBP SA) is a private bank and wealth management firm headquartered in Geneva. UBP is one of the largest private banks in Switzerland and serves private and institutional clients. Edgar de Picciotto founded the bank in 1969.

== History ==
Edgar de Picciotto established the Compagnie de Banque et d’Investissements (CBI) in Geneva on 11 November 1969. CBI acquired TDB-American Express Bank in 1990, which led to the creation of the current entity, Union Bancaire Privée. UBP developed further with the takeover of the Discount Bank and Trust Company in 2002.

In 2011, UBP acquired the Swiss arm of Dutch state-owned ABN Amro Bank, a pure Swiss private bank. The same year, UBP also broadened its operations in Asia by establishing two joint ventures in Hong Kong and Taiwan with TransGlobe.

In 2012, UBP acquired Paris-based fund of hedge funds Nexar Capital Group, which has offices in London, Jersey and New York.

In May 2013, UBP announced the acquisition of Lloyds Banking Group’s International Private Banking business.

On 26 March 2015, UBP signed an agreement with the Royal Bank of Scotland Group (RBS) to buy the international private banking activities of RBS's subsidiary, Coutts & Co International. This meant that UBP assumed control of their entities in Switzerland, Monaco and the Middle East.

In May 2016 UBP announced it signed an agreement with SEB, a Nordic financial services group, enabling UBP to distribute SEB's Luxembourg fund range to institutional clients and third-party distributors.

In January 2017, UBP announced a partnership with Partners Group, the global private markets investment manager.

In May 2018, UBP announced it was acquiring Banque Carnegie Luxembourg.

In July 2018, UBP expanded its activities in the UK with the acquisition of ACPI.

In January 2019 the rating agency Moody's assigned UBP a long-term deposit rating of Aa2 with a stable outlook.

In 2021, UBP made two acquisitions. First, UBP acquired Millennium Banque Privée, a Geneva private banking subsidiary of Portuguese bank Banco Comercial Português. The second acquisition was Danske Bank's wealth management business in Luxembourg, Danske Bank International, which brought assets under management at UBP's Luxembourg subsidiary to over CHF 33 billion.

== Corporate affairs ==
Union Bancaire Privée has over 300 private wealth managers in different countries.

In April 2013, UBP announced a partnership with Guggenheim Fund Solutions (GFS).

== Settlement with Investment Securities Trustee ==
In March 2009, the bank offered to compensate eligible investors who had lost money during the Madoff investment scandal 50 per cent of the money they had initially invested. On 6 December 2010, UBP announced it had reached a settlement with the trustee when it agreed to pay $500 million. UBP was the first bank to settle the trustee's claim in the Bernie Madoff case. With this settlement, the trustee has agreed to discharge the "clawback" claims against UBP, its affiliates and clients.

== Legal matters and SEC settlements ==
In 2016, Union Bancaire Privée was ordered to pay Internal Revenue Service $187 million USD in penalties for conspiring with U.S. taxpayers to evade taxation through the use of fraudulent services and transactions in order mask the ownership of foreign-owned accounts and assets. Acting Assistant Attorney General Caroline D. Ciraolo of the Department of Justice tax division is quoted saying “Under the terms of the agreement, UBP pays a heavy price for its criminal conduct and must cooperate fully in all matters relating to the conduct described in the agreement until all civil or criminal examinations, investigations or proceedings are concluded.”

== See also ==
- List of investors in Bernard L. Madoff Securities
