= Robert Jaffe =

Robert Jaffe may refer to:

- Robert Jaffe (producer), American producer, actor and screenwriter
- Robert Jaffe (stockbroker), American stockbroker
- Robert Jaffe (physicist) (born 1946), American physicist
