= Bank Medici =

Former Austrian bank (2003–09)

Bank Medici AG
- Company type: Bank
- Founded: 1994 (incorporated in 2003)
- Founder: Sonja Kohn
- Defunct: 2009
- Headquarters: Vienna, Austria
- Services: Banking
- Owner: Sonja Kohn

Bank Medici AG was a bank based in Vienna, Austria. It was founded in 1994 by banker Sonja Kohn and incorporated as a bank in 2003.

Bank Medici's president and majority stakeholder was Sonja Kohn. Its main institutional shareholder was Bank Austria Creditanstalt, Austria's largest banking group. Kohn owned 75% of the bank, and Bank Austria owned the balance.

== Madoff investments ==
Bank Medici was investment manager for Thema International Fund, which invested with Bernard Madoff. Bank Medici collected fees of 4.6 million euros for finding investors for Thema in 2007.

Following news on 2 January 2009 that the Bank may have lost $3 billion invested with funds run by Madoff, the Austrian government appointed a supervisor to run the bank. On January 7, The New York Times reported the exposure to Madoff was $2.1 billion, some of which may have come from Russian oligarchs. After the Madoff losses were reported, Ms. Kohn, aged 60 at the time, and her husband Erwin had largely been out of public sight. The Austrian-government-appointed commissioner Gerhard Altenberger has been effectively managing the bank in that time.

On January 14, 2009, William Galvin, Secretary of the Commonwealth of Massachusetts, who is in charge of the state's securities issues, filed suit against Robert Jaffe, who promoted Madoff's funds to wealthy investors in Massachusetts and Florida. On February 4, compelled to testify, Jaffe invoked his Fifth Amendment right. Marcia Cohn, Maurice Cohn, and Alvin Delaire, Jr. failed to appear. On February 11, 2009, Galvin filed a complaint seeking to revoke the Massachusetts license of Cohmad Securities Corp., an accounting of all Massachusetts investors Cohmad referred to Madoff's company, all the fees it earned doing so (more than $67 million), and a fine. It cited $526,000 in referral fees paid from Madoff Investments, to Cohmad, to Vienna Bank Medici majority owner, Sonja Kohn, which she subsequently denied. On May 28, 2009, Bank Medici lost its Austrian banking license. Kohn and the Bank are under investigation.

== See also ==
- Madoff investment scandal
- List of investors in Bernard L. Madoff Securities
- List of banks in Austria
