= Genevalor Benbassat & Cie =

Swiss financial services company

- Industry: asset management
- Founded: 1983; 43 years ago
- Founder: Mario Benbassat
- Headquarters: 6 Place Camoletti, Geneva, Switzerland
- Website: www.genevalor.ch

Genevalor Benbassat & Cie is an asset manager located in Geneva, Switzerland. The firm set up five European feeder funds that invested almost $2 billion into Bernie Madoff's criminal Ponzi scheme.

== History ==
Genevalor was founded in 1983. In 1992 Sonja Kohn introduced Bernie Madoff to Mario Benbassat, founder of Genevalor Benbassat & Cie, and his two sons in New York, as a possible source of new funds for Madoff. Genevalor set up five European feeder funds, including $1.1bn Irish fund Thema International Fund set up by Thema Asset Management, a British Virgin Islands-based company 55 per cent owned by Genevalor, and invested almost $2 billion with Madoff. Thema International paid fees of 1.25 per cent ($13.75m a year) to Genevalor Benbasset & Cie. The Wall Street Journal reported in December 2008 that the company was said to be a key player distributing Madoff investments in the Madoff investment scandal.

In December 2010, U.S. court-appointed trustee Irving Picard sued HSBC for $9 billion, accusing it of aiding the Madoff fraud “through the creation, marketing and support of an international network of a dozen feeder funds." The feeder funds named included Genevalor, Benbassat & Cie, which said: “it strongly denies any allegation that it had prior knowledge of the fraud committed by Madoff. This unfounded action causes a significant harm to the investors and to itself.”

In February 2014, Genevalor, Benbassat & Cie on behalf of three funds, who invested with a company owned by Madoff, sued five Lloyd's syndicates under an insurance policy.

In September 2017, Thema agreed to pay $687 million to victims of the Madoff fraud to resolve a lawsuit by Picard.

In November 2017, the company was struck off.

== See also ==
- List of investors in Bernard L. Madoff Securities
