= Citco =

Financial services company based in the BVI

- Type: Hedge fund administrator
- Industry: financial industry
- Founded: 1948; 78 years ago
- Headquarters: Tortola, British Virgin Islands
- Key people: Christopher Smeets, CEO
- Total assets: $1.5 trillion (under administration) (2020)
- Number of employees: >11,000

Citco, also known as the Citco Group of Companies and the Curaçao International Trust Co., is a privately owned global hedge fund administrator headquartered in the British Virgin Islands, founded in 1948. It is the world's largest hedge fund administrator, managing over $1.8 trillion in assets under administration.

== History ==
Citco is a large privately owned global hedge fund administrator. It is headquartered in Tortola in the British Virgin Islands. It is the world's largest hedge fund administrator. Citco was founded in 1948.

In 1965, the Sandoz Family Foundation made a substantial equity investment in Citco.

In 1999, Citco purchased a majority interest in Quaker Securities Inc., a private institutional brokerage firm in Valley Forge, Pennsylvania.

In 2005, an investor group including the Smeets Family Trust acquired a controlling interest in Citco from the Sandoz Family Foundation, which retained a minority ownership position and a seat on the Citco board. Christopher Smeets, CEO, and Citco's management team continued to operate the business.

In 2010, Citco purchased the trust company operation of Wells Fargo in the Cayman Islands.

== Operations ==
Citco in 2005 represented the largest global service provider to hedge funds, administering $250 billion in assets from 40 offices around the world. Citco also served as custodian for $150 billion in hedge fund assets. Citco also provided corporate and private client fiduciary services to multinational companies, financial institutions, and their professional advisors. Citco provided corporate/fiduciary, fund administration, brokerage, banking, and data processing services. In 2011, Citco had 2,000 hedge fund clients.

In 2017, Citco had over 6,200 employees worldwide in Europe, North America, Australia, Asia, and the Caribbean and in 2018 after 5 per cent growth it managed over $1 trillion in assets under administration.

== Litigation ==
In 2003, investors in Lancer Group sued Citco for allegedly knowingly disseminating "misleading" net asset value (NAV) statements. Citco ultimately informed investors that it was resigning as administrator to Lancer's funds, but did not provide an explanation. While Citco pointed to the fact that it had sought statements from Lancer's board of directors as to the propriety of the valuations, Judge Shira Scheindlin wrote: "Although these actions demonstrate Citco Group's questioning of the numbers, they could also be interpreted as Citco Group's efforts to shield its own involvement in the process". Ultimately, Citco settled with investors.

In 2013, three Louisiana retirement systems that had invested $100 million in a hedge fund promising high returns with low risk sued Citco, which administered the deal. The suit alleged that Citco told pension trustees that their investment was gaining value while that was not true, as Citco misled the investors as to the true value of the investment's assets.

In March 2015, Roger Corman and his wife filed a lawsuit against Citco alleging causes of action including breach of fiduciary duty, fraud, misrepresentation, and unjust enrichment, saying they ended up losing up to $60 million due to the inappropriate actions and inactions of Citco, the administrator of the fund.

Investors in Fairfield Greenwich Group, the biggest operator of “feeder funds” for Ponzi schemer Bernard Madoff, brought suit against Citco in the case of Anwar v. Fairfield Greenwich, U.S. District Court, Southern District of New York, before Judge Shira Scheindlin. The investors asserted that Citco was required to calculate independently the funds' NAVs and to provide those numbers to shareholders, but instead: "Citco blindly and recklessly relied on information provided by Madoff and the Funds to calculate and disseminate the Funds' NAV ... even though that information was manifestly erroneous." Citco was accused of failing to properly monitor and value Fairfield Greenwich's investments, more than $7 billion of which were sent to Bernard L. Madoff Investment Securities LLC. The investors said they suffered big losses from Citco's deception and negligence once Madoff's Ponzi scheme was uncovered in December 2008. In August 2015, Citco agreed to pay $125 million to settle claims it misled investors into investing with Fairfield Greenwich Group . The settlement was the largest with an administrator or custodian related to Madoff's fraud.
