= Leonard Litwin =

- Born: October 16, 1914; New York City, New York, U.S.
- Died: April 2, 2017 (aged 102); Melville, New York, U.S.
- Occupation: real estate developer
- Spouse: Ruth Litwin
- Children: Carole Litwin Pittelman; Diane Litwin Miller

Leonard Litwin (October 16, 1914 – April 2, 2017) was an American real estate developer who, through his company, Glenwood Management, specialized in residential construction. His firm currently owns and operates about twenty-four buildings in Manhattan. and rents about 4,200 high-end units. His buildings have a reputation for being well-built and managed.

== Biography ==
Born to a Jewish family, Litwin began his career in the nursery business with his father. In the 1950s, however, Litwin became interested in real estate development and began building high-rise apartment buildings on Manhattan's Upper East Side. In the 1960s Litwin built what was then city's largest luxury high rise, The Pavilion. His Liberty Plaza, a 45-story apartment rental complex, was the first new building to rise in Manhattan after the September 11 attacks.

In 2006, Litwin ranked number 374 on the Forbes 400, with a net worth of approximately $1 billion. In 2007, he had dropped to number 891, with a net worth of still around $1 billion. He was named as one of the holders of an account with alleged Ponzi scheme firm Bernard L. Madoff Securities in a court filing in February 2009.

== Philanthropy and political activities ==
Notwithstanding his success in real estate, Litwin remained in the nursery business, operating Woodbourne Cultural Nurseries, Inc., in Melville, on Long Island, NY. He was turning the nursery into an arboretum of over 200 acres. With fellow developer Don Zucker, he co-founded the Litwin-Zucker Research Center for the Study of Alzheimer's Disease at The Feinstein Institute for Medical Research in Manhasset, New York, and substantially supported research at several hospitals. Additionally, Litwin established The Litwin Foundation.

In 2012, at age 97, he was rated as the highest individual donor to New York State politicians in the past year, with donations amounting to $700,000. He avoided caps on his donations by using his limited liability companies (LLCs). He gave state Republicans $436,500 and Governor Andrew Cuomo $76,000. William Street Associates is an LLC which once was headed by Leonard Litwin. The firm made a donation to Peter Vallone's campaign in 2000. In 2017, the Crohn's & Colitis Foundation renamed its Broad Medical Research Program to the Litwin IBD Pioneers Initiative after Litwin for his lifelong support for the IBD community.

== Personal life ==
Litwin was married to Ruth Litwin; she died in 2014. They had two daughters: Carole Litwin Pittelman, acting as the company's president, and Diane Litwin Miller.

Leonard Litwin died on April 2, 2017, at the age of 102.

== See also ==
- List of investors in Bernard L. Madoff Securities
