= Madoff investment scandal =

Investment scandal discovered in 2008

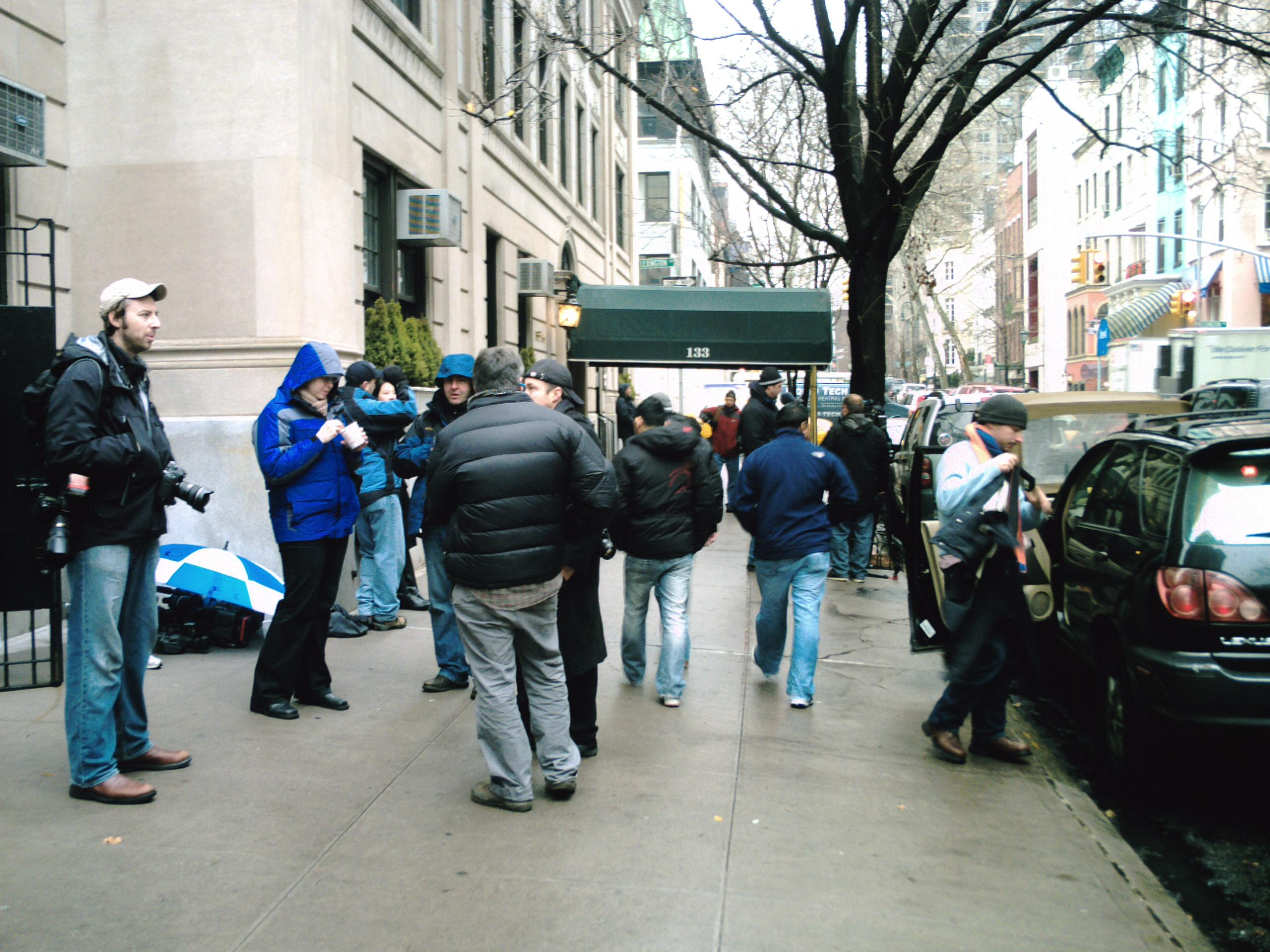
Photographers waiting outside the entrance to the apartment block where Madoff was under house arrest.

The Madoff investment scandal, sometimes known as Madoffgate, was a financial scandal discovered in late 2008. In December of that year, Bernie Madoff, the former Nasdaq chairman and founder of the Wall Street firm Bernard L. Madoff Investment Securities LLC, admitted that the wealth management arm of his business was an elaborate multi-billion-dollar Ponzi scheme. Madoff founded Bernard L. Madoff Investment Securities LLC in 1960, and was its chairman until his arrest. The firm employed Madoff's brother Peter as senior managing director and chief compliance officer, Peter's daughter Shana Madoff as rules and compliance officer and attorney, and Madoff's sons Mark and Andrew. Peter was sentenced to 10 years in prison, and Mark died by suicide two years to the day after his father's arrest.

Alerted by Madoff's sons, federal authorities arrested Madoff on December 11, 2008. On March 12, 2009, Madoff pleaded guilty to 11 federal crimes and admitted to operating the largest known Ponzi scheme in history. On June 29, 2009, he was sentenced to 150 years in prison, the maximum sentence allowed, with restitution of $170 billion. He died in prison in 2021. According to the original federal charges, Madoff said that his firm had "liabilities of approximately US$50billion." Prosecutors estimated the size of the fraud to be $64.8 billion, based on the amounts in the accounts of Madoff's 4,800 clients as of November 30, 2008. Ignoring opportunity costs and taxes paid on fictitious profits, about half of Madoff's direct investors lost no money. Harry Markopolos, a whistleblower whose repeated warnings about Madoff were ignored, estimated that at least $35 billion of the money Madoff claimed to have stolen never really existed, but was simply fictional profits he reported to his clients.

Investigators determined that others were involved in the scheme. The U.S. Securities and Exchange Commission (SEC) was criticized for not investigating Madoff more thoroughly; questions about his firm had been raised as early as 1999. The legitimate trading arm of Madoff's business that was run by his two sons was one of the top market makers on Wall Street, and in 2008 was the sixth-largest. Madoff's personal and business asset freeze created a chain reaction throughout the world's business and philanthropic community, forcing many organizations to at least temporarily close, including the Robert I. Lappin Charitable Foundation, the Picower Foundation, and the JEHT Foundation.

== Background ==
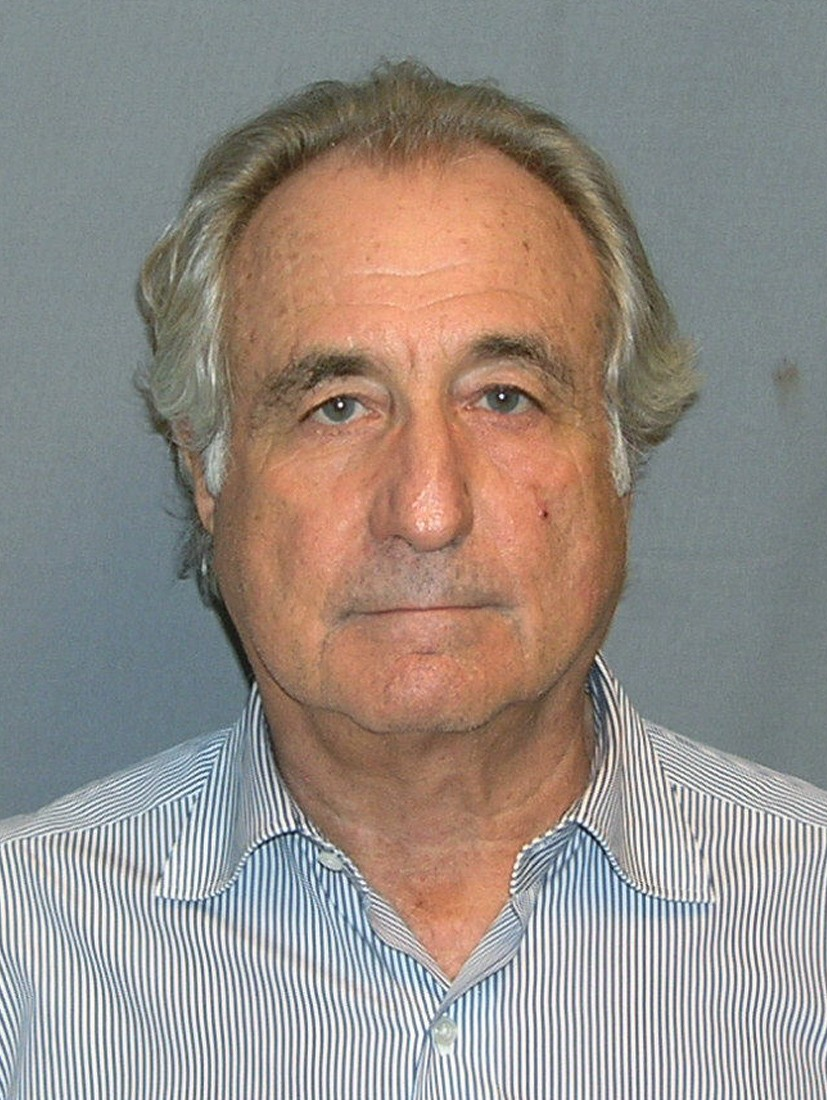
Madoff in 2009 after his arrest

Madoff started his firm in 1960 as a penny stock trader with $5,000 ($54,415 in 2025), earned from working as a lifeguard and sprinkler installer, and $50,000 that he had borrowed from his in-laws ($544,151 in 2025). His fledgling business, which he founded with his high school sweetheart Ruth Alpern, began to grow with the assistance of his father-in-law, accountant Saul Alpern, who referred a circle of friends and their families. Initially, the firm made markets (quoted bid and ask prices) via the National Quotation Bureau's Pink Sheets. To compete with firms that were members of the New York Stock Exchange (NYSE) trading on the stock exchange's floor, his firm began using innovative computer information technology to disseminate quotes. After a trial run, the technology that the firm helped develop became Nasdaq. At one point, Madoff Securities was the largest buying-and-selling "market maker" at the Nasdaq.

He was active in the National Association of Securities Dealers (NASD), a self-regulatory securities industry organization, serving as the chairman of the board of directors and on the board of governors.

In 1992, Randall Smith of The Wall Street Journal described him as:

... one of the masters of the off-exchange "third market" and the bane of the New York Stock Exchange. He has built a highly profitable securities firm, Bernard L. Madoff Investment Securities, which siphons a huge volume of stock trades away from the Big Board. The $740 million [$1.7 billion in 2025] average daily volume of trades executed electronically by the Madoff firm off the exchange equals 9% of the New York exchange's. Mr. Madoff's firm can execute trades so quickly and cheaply that it actually pays other brokerage firms a penny a share to execute their customers' orders, profiting from the spread between bid and asked prices that most stocks trade for.

Several family members worked for him. His younger brother, Peter, was senior managing director and chief compliance officer, and Peter's daughter, Shana Madoff, was the compliance attorney. Madoff's sons, Mark and Andrew, worked in the trading section, along with Charles Weiner, Madoff's nephew. Andrew Madoff invested his own money in his father's fund, but Mark stopped in about 2001.

Federal investigators believe the fraud in the investment management division and advisory division may have begun in the 1970s. However, Madoff himself stated his fraudulent activities began in the 1990s. Madoff's fraudulent activities are believed to have accelerated after the 2001 change from fractional share trades to decimals on the NYSE, which cut significantly into his legitimate profits as a market-maker. With fractional trades Madoff profited up to 12.5 cents per share with each trade handled by his firm, but following decimalization this bid–ask spread between sellers and buyers was reduced to as low as one cent.

In the 1980s, Madoff's market-maker division traded up to 5% of the total volume made on the NYSE. Madoff was "the first prominent practitioner" of payment for order flow, paying brokers to execute their clients' orders through his brokerage, a practice some have called a "legal kickback". This practice gave Madoff the distinction of being the largest dealer in NYSE-listed stocks in the U.S., trading about 15% of transaction volume. Academics have questioned the ethics of these payments. Madoff has argued that these payments did not alter the price that the customer received. He viewed payments for order flow as a normal business practice: "If your girlfriend goes to buy stockings at a supermarket, the racks that display those stockings are usually paid for by the company that manufactured the stockings. Order flow is an issue that attracted a lot of attention but is grossly overrated."

By 2000, Madoff Securities, one of the top traders of US securities, held approximately $300 million in assets ($561 million in 2025). The business occupied three floors of the Lipstick Building in Manhattan, with the investment management division on the 17th floor, referred to as the "hedge fund", employing a staff of fewer than 24. Madoff also ran a branch office in London that employed 28 people, separate from Madoff Securities. The company handled investments for his family of approximately £80 million. Two remote cameras installed in the London office permitted Madoff to monitor events from New York.

After 41 years as a sole proprietorship, Madoff converted his firm into a limited liability company in 2001, with himself as the sole shareholder.

== Modus operandi ==
In 1992, Bernard Madoff explained his purported strategy to The Wall Street Journal. He said his returns were really nothing special, given that the Standard & Poors 500-stock index generated an average annual return of 16.3% between November 1982 and November 1992. "I would be surprised if anybody thought that matching the S&P over 10 years was anything outstanding." The majority of money managers actually trailed the S&P 500 during the 1980s. The Journal concluded Madoff's use of futures and options helped cushion the returns against the market's ups and downs. Madoff said he made up for the cost of the hedges, which could have caused him to trail the stock market's returns, with stock-picking and market timing.

=== Purported strategy ===
Madoff's sales pitch was an investment strategy consisting of purchasing blue-chip stocks and taking options contracts on them, sometimes called a split-strike conversion or a collar. "Typically, a position will consist of the ownership of 30–35 S&P 100 stocks, most correlated to that index, the sale of out-of-the-money 'calls' on the index and the purchase of out-of-the-money 'puts' on the index. The sale of the 'calls' is designed to increase the rate of return, while allowing upward movement of the stock portfolio to the strike price of the 'calls'. The 'puts', funded in large part by the sales of the 'calls', limit the portfolio's downside."

In his 1992 "Avellino and Bienes" interview with The Wall Street Journal, Madoff discussed his supposed methods: In the 1970s, he had placed invested funds in "convertible arbitrage positions in large-cap stocks, with promised investment returns of 18% to 20%", and in 1982, he began using futures contracts on the stock index, and then placed put options on futures during the 1987 stock market crash. A few analysts performing due diligence had been unable to replicate the Madoff fund's past returns using historic price data for U.S. stocks and options on the indexes. Barron's raised the possibility that Madoff's returns were most likely due to front running his firm's brokerage clients.

Mitchell Zuckoff, professor of journalism at Boston University and author of Ponzi's Scheme: The True Story of a Financial Legend, says that "the 5% payout rule", a federal law requiring private foundations to pay out 5% of their funds each year, allowed Madoff's Ponzi scheme to go undetected for a long period since he managed money mainly for charities. Zuckoff notes, "For every $1 billion in foundation investment, Madoff was effectively on the hook for about $50 million in withdrawals a year. If he was not making real investments, at that rate the principal would last 20 years. But by continuing to add new (if more volatile) investments, a Ponzi scheme built on that approach could thrive long into the future. [...] By targeting charities, Madoff could avoid the threat of sudden or unexpected withdrawals."

In his guilty plea, Madoff admitted that he had not actually traded since the early 1990s, and all of his returns since then had been fabricated. However, David Sheehan, principal investigator for trustee Irving Picard, believes the wealth management arm of Madoff's business had been a fraud from the start.

Madoff's operation differed from a typical Ponzi scheme. While most Ponzi schemes are based on nonexistent businesses, Madoff's brokerage operation arm was very real. At the time of its shuttering, it handled large trades for institutional investors.

=== Sales methods ===
Madoff was a "master marketer" who, throughout the 1970s and 1980s, built a reputation as a wealth manager for a highly exclusive clientele. Investors who gained access, typically on word-of-mouth referral, believed that they had entered the inner circle of a money-making genius, and some were wary of removing their money from his fund, in case they could not get back in. In later years, even as Madoff's operation accepted money from various countries through feeder funds, he continued to package it as an exclusive opportunity. People who met him in person were impressed with his apparent humility despite his reported financial success and personal wealth.

A scheme that targets members of a particular religious or ethnic community is a type of affinity fraud, and a Newsweek article identified Madoff's scheme as "an affinity Ponzi". The New York Post reported that Madoff "worked the so-called 'Jewish circuit' of well-heeled Jews he met at country clubs on Long Island and in Palm Beach." The scandal so affected Palm Beach that, according to The Globe and Mail, residents "stopped talking about the local destruction the Madoff storm caused only when Hurricane Trump came along" in 2016. The New York Times reported that Madoff courted many prominent Jewish executives and organizations and, according to the Associated Press, they "trusted [Madoff] because he is Jewish." One of the most prominent promoters was J. Ezra Merkin, whose fund Ascot Partners steered $1.8 billion towards Madoff's firm.

Most Ponzi schemes appeal to greed, but Madoff appealed to investors' fear of volatility. His "unusually consistent" annual returns of around 10% were a key factor in perpetuating the fraud. Ponzi schemes typically pay returns of 20% or higher and collapse quickly. One Madoff fund, which described its "strategy" as focusing on shares in the Standard & Poor's 100-stock index, reported a 10.5% annual return during the previous 17 years. Even at the end of November 2008, amid a general market collapse, the same fund reported that it was up 5.6%, while the same year-to-date total return on the S&P 500-stock index had been negative 38%. Diana Henriques of the Times said that Madoff's victims could have made much more money in other investments

But they were willing to give up those greater returns in exchange for the consistency of Madoff's returns. He made them feel safe. They all thought they were taking a conservative step.

An unnamed investor remarked, "The returns were just amazing, and we trusted this guy for decades — if you wanted to take money out, you always got your check in a few days. That's why we were all so stunned."

The Swiss bank Union Bancaire Privée explained that because of Madoff's huge volume as a broker-dealer, the bank believed he had a perceived edge on the market because his trades were timed well, suggesting they believed he was front running.

=== Access to Washington ===
The Madoff family gained close access to Washington's lawmakers and regulators through its long-standing, high-level ties to the Securities Industry and Financial Markets Association (SIFMA), the primary securities industry organization.

Bernard Madoff sat on the board of directors of the Securities Industry Association, which merged with the Bond Market Association in 2006 to form SIFMA. Madoff's brother Peter subsequently spent two terms on SIFMA's board. From 2000 to 2008, the brothers donated $56,000 to SIFMA, and also spent tens of thousands to sponsor SIFMA industry meetings. Peter resigned from the board in December 2008 as the Madoff scandal began to come to light and scrutiny of the brothers' relationship with SIFMA and regulators increased.

In addition, Bernard Madoff's niece Shana Madoff who was the compliance officer and attorney at Bernard L. Madoff Investment Securities from 1995 until 2008, was active on the Executive Committee of SIFMA's Compliance & Legal Division, but resigned her SIFMA position shortly after her uncle's arrest. She in 2007 married former assistant director of the SEC's Office of Compliance Inspections and Examinations Eric Swanson, whom she had met in April 2003 while he was investigating her uncle Bernie Madoff and his firm. The two had periodic contact thereafter in connection with Swanson speaking at industry events organized by a SIFMA committee on which Shana Madoff sat. During 2003, Swanson sent Shana's father Peter Madoff two regulatory requests. In March 2004, SEC lawyer Genevievette Walker-Lightfoot, who was reviewing Madoff's firm, raised questions to Swanson (Walker-Lightfoot's boss's supervisor) about unusual trading at a Bernie Madoff fund; Walker-Lightfoot was told to instead concentrate on an unrelated matter. Swanson and Walker-Lightfoot's boss asked for her research, but did not act upon it. In February 2006, Swanson was emailed by Assistant Director John Nee that the SEC's New York Regional Office was investigating a complaint that Bernard Madoff might be running "the biggest Ponzi scheme ever."

In April 2006, Swanson began to date Shana Madoff. Swanson reported the relationship to his supervisor who wrote in an email "I guess we won't be investigating Madoff anytime soon." On 15 September 2006, Swanson left the SEC. On December 8, 2006, Swanson and Shana Madoff became engaged. In 2007, the two married. A spokesman for Swanson said he "did not participate in any inquiry of Bernard Madoff Securities or its affiliates while involved in a relationship" with Shana Madoff.

== Previous investigations ==
Madoff Securities LLC was investigated at least eight times over a 16-year period by the U.S. Securities and Exchange Commission (SEC) and other regulatory authorities.

=== Avellino and Bienes ===
In 1992, the SEC investigated one of Madoff's feeder funds, Avellino & Bienes, the principals being Frank Avellino, Michael Bienes, and his wife Dianne Bienes. Bienes began his career working as an accountant for Madoff's father-in-law, Saul Alpern. Then, he became a partner in the accounting firm Alpern, Avellino and Bienes. In 1962, the firm began advising its clients about investing all of their money with a mystery man, a highly successful and controversial figure on Wall Street—but until this episode, not known as an ace money manager—Madoff. When Alpern retired at the end of 1974, the firm became Avellino and Bienes and continued to invest solely with Madoff.

Avellino & Bienes, represented by Ira Sorkin, Madoff's former attorney, were accused of selling unregistered securities. In a report to the SEC they mentioned the fund's "curiously steady" yearly returns to investors of 13.5% to 20%. However, the SEC did not look any more deeply into the matter, and never publicly referred to Madoff. Through Sorkin, who once oversaw the SEC's New York office, Avellino & Bienes agreed to return the money to investors, shut down their firm, undergo an audit, and pay a fine of $350,000. Avellino complained to the presiding federal judge, John E. Sprizzo, that Price Waterhouse fees were excessive, but the judge ordered him to pay the bill of $428,679 in full. Madoff said that he did not realize the feeder fund was operating illegally, and that his own investment returns tracked the previous 10 years of the S&P 500. The SEC investigation came right in the middle of Madoff's three terms as the chairman of the Nasdaq stock market board.

The size of the pools mushroomed by word-of-mouth, and investors grew to 3,200 in nine accounts with Madoff. Regulators feared it all might be just a huge scam. "We went into this thinking it could be a major catastrophe. They took in nearly a half a billion dollars in investor money, totally outside the system that we can monitor and regulate. That's pretty frightening," said Richard Walker, who at the time was the SEC's New York regional administrator.

Avellino and Bienes deposited $454 million of investors' money with Madoff, and until 2007, Bienes continued to invest several million dollars of his own money with Madoff. In a 2009 interview after the scam had been exposed, he said, "Doubt Bernie Madoff? Doubt Bernie? No. You doubt God. You can doubt God, but you don't doubt Bernie. He had that aura about him."

=== SEC ===
The SEC investigated Madoff in 1999 and 2000 about concerns that the firm was hiding its customers' orders from other traders, for which Madoff then took corrective measures. In 2001, an SEC official met with Harry Markopolos at their Boston regional office and reviewed his allegations of Madoff's fraudulent practices. The SEC said it conducted two other inquiries into Madoff in the last several years, but did not find any violations or major issues of concern.

In 2004, after published articles appeared accusing the firm of front running, the SEC's Washington office cleared Madoff. The SEC detailed that inspectors had examined Madoff's brokerage operation in 2005, checking for three kinds of violations: the strategy he used for customer accounts; the requirement of brokers to obtain the best possible price for customer orders; and operating as an unregistered investment adviser. Madoff was registered as a broker-dealer, but doing business as an asset manager. "The staff found no evidence of fraud". In September 2005 Madoff agreed to register his business, but the SEC kept its findings confidential. During the 2005 investigation, Meaghan Cheung, a branch head of the SEC's New York's Enforcement Division, was the person responsible for the oversight and blunder, according to Markopolos, who testified on February 4, 2009, at a hearing held by a House Financial Services Subcommittee on Capital Markets.

In 2007, SEC enforcement completed an investigation they had begun on January 6, 2006, into a Ponzi scheme allegation. This investigation resulted in neither a finding of fraud, nor a referral to the SEC Commissioners for legal action.

=== FINRA ===
In 2007, the Financial Industry Regulatory Authority (FINRA), the industry-run watchdog for brokerage firms, reported without explanation that parts of Madoff's firm had no customers. "At this point in time we are uncertain of the basis for FINRA's conclusion in this regard," SEC staff wrote shortly after Madoff was arrested.

As a result, the chairman of the SEC, Christopher Cox, stated that an investigation would delve into "all staff contact and relationships with the Madoff family and firm, and their impact, if any, on decisions by staff regarding the firm". A former SEC compliance officer, Eric Swanson, had married Madoff's niece Shana, the Madoff firm compliance attorney.

=== Other warnings ===
Outside analysts raised concerns about Madoff's firm for years. Mathematician Edward O. Thorp noted irregularities in 1991. Among other problems, Thorp found evidence Madoff was lying about or exaggerating his activities. While Madoff claimed to have purchased 123 call options for Procter & Gamble stock on April 16, 1991, Thorp later stated "only 20 P&G options in total had changed hands that day."

Rob Picard of the Royal Bank of Canada (RBC), seeking low-volatility investments, was referred to Madoff in 1997 by employees of Tremont Group who were one of Madoff's key "feeder funds". When pressed for details of his investing strategy, Madoff "stuttered" and became evasive. Picard later stated: "right away I realized he either didn't understand it or he wasn't doing what he said he was doing." Suspecting fraud, RBC declined to invest with Madoff and also cut off professional contact with Tremont.

The next major concern about Madoff's operation was raised in May 2000, when Harry Markopolos, a financial analyst and portfolio manager at Boston options trader Rampart Investment Management, alerted the SEC about his suspicions. A year earlier, Rampart had learned that Access International Advisors, one of its trading partners, had significant investments with Madoff. Markopolos' bosses at Rampart asked him to design a product that could replicate Madoff's returns. However, Markopolos concluded that Madoff's numbers didn't add up. After four hours of trying and failing to replicate Madoff's returns, Markopolos concluded Madoff was a fraud. He told the SEC that based on his analysis of Madoff's returns, it was mathematically impossible for Madoff to deliver them using the strategies he claimed to use. In his view, there were only two ways to explain the figures—either Madoff was front running his order flow, or his wealth management business was a massive Ponzi scheme. This submission, along with three others, passed with no substantive action from the SEC. At the time of Markopolos' initial submission, Madoff managed assets from between $3 billion and $6 billion, which would have made his wealth management business the largest hedge fund in the world even then. The culmination of Markopolos' analysis was his third submission, a detailed 17-page memo entitled The World's Largest Hedge Fund is a Fraud. He had also approached The Wall Street Journal about the existence of the Ponzi scheme in 2005, but its editors decided not to pursue the story. The memo specified 30 "red flags" based on a little over 14 years of Madoff trades. The biggest red flag was that Madoff reported only seven losing months during this time, and those losses were statistically insignificant. This result produced a return stream that rose steadily upward with almost no downticks, represented graphically by a nearly-perfect 45-degree angle. Markopolos argued that anyone who knows the math of the markets would know that such a distribution "simply doesn't exist in finance," since the markets were far too volatile even under the best of conditions for this to be possible. Later, Markopolos testified before Congress that this would be like a baseball player batting .966 for the season, compared to .300 to .400 for elite players, "and no one suspecting a cheat". In part, the memo concluded: "Bernie Madoff is running the world's largest unregistered hedge fund. He's organized this business as a 'hedge fund of funds' privately labeling their own hedge funds which Bernie Madoff secretly runs for them using a split-strike conversion strategy getting paid only trading commissions which are not disclosed. If this is not a regulatory dodge, I do not know what is." Markopolos declared that Madoff's "unsophisticated portfolio management" was either a Ponzi scheme or front running (buying stock for his own account based on knowledge of his clients' orders), and concluded it was most likely a Ponzi scheme. Markopolos later testified to Congress that to deliver 12% annual returns to the investor, Madoff needed to earn an extraordinary 16% gross on a regular basis, so as to distribute a 4% fee to the feeder fund managers, whom Madoff needed to secure new victims, which encouraged the feeder funds to be "willfully blind, and not get too intrusive". Though Markopolos's findings were neglected by regulators he did persuade some professional investors. Joel Tillinghast, a mutual fund manager at Fidelity Investments, had been intrigued by anecdotes of Madoff's steady gains. But after a 2000 meeting with Markopolos he became convinced "nothing in Madoff's ostensible strategy made sense."

In 2001, financial journalist Erin Arvedlund wrote an article for Barron's entitled "Don't Ask, Don't Tell", questioning Madoff's secrecy and wondering how he obtained such consistent returns. She reported that "Madoff's investors rave about his performance – even though they don't understand how he does it. 'Even knowledgeable people can't really tell you what he's doing,' one very satisfied investor told Barron's." The Barron's article and one in MARHedge by Michael Ocrant suggested Madoff was front-running to achieve his gains. In 2001 Ocrant, editor-in-chief of MARHedge, wrote he interviewed traders who were incredulous that Madoff had 72 consecutive gaining months, an unlikely possibility. Hedge funds investing with him were not permitted to name him as money manager in their marketing prospectus. When high-volume investors who were considering participation wanted to review Madoff's records for purposes of due diligence, he refused, convincing them of his desire to keep his proprietary strategies confidential.

By purportedly selling its holdings for cash at the end of each period, Madoff avoided filing disclosures of its holdings with the SEC, an unusual tactic. Madoff rejected any call for an outside audit "for reasons of secrecy", claiming that was the exclusive responsibility of his brother, Peter, the company's chief compliance officer.

Concerns were also raised that Madoff's auditor of record was Friehling & Horowitz, a two-person accounting firm based in suburban Rockland County that had only one active accountant, David G. Friehling, a close Madoff family friend. Friehling was also an investor in Madoff's fund, which was seen as a blatant conflict of interest. In 2007, hedge fund consultant Aksia advised its clients not to invest with Madoff, saying it was inconceivable that a tiny firm could adequately service such a massive operation.

Typically, hedge funds hold their portfolio at a securities firm (a major bank or brokerage), which acts as the fund's prime broker. This arrangement allows outside investigators to verify the holdings. Madoff's firm was its own broker-dealer, and purported to process all of its trades.

Ironically, Madoff, a pioneer in electronic trading, refused to provide his clients online access to their accounts. He sent out account statements by mail, unlike most hedge funds, which email statements.

Madoff also operated as a broker-dealer, running an asset management division. In 2003, Joe Aaron, a hedge-fund professional, believed the structure suspicious and warned a colleague to avoid investing in the fund, "Why would a good businessman work his magic for pennies on the dollar?" he concluded. Also in 2003, Renaissance Technologies, "arguably the most successful hedge fund in the world", reduced its exposure to Madoff's fund first by 50 percent and eventually completely because of suspicions about the consistency of returns, the fact that Madoff charged very little compared to other hedge funds, and the impossibility of the strategy Madoff claimed to use because options volume had no relation to the amount of money Madoff was said to administer. The options volume implied that Madoff's fund had $750 million, while he was believed to be managing $15 billion—and only if Madoff was assumed to be responsible for all the options traded in the most liquid strike price.

Charles J. Gradante, co-founder of hedge-fund research firm Hennessee Group, observed that Madoff "only had five down months since 1996", and commented on Madoff's investment performance: "You can't go 10 or 15 years with only three or four down months. It's just impossible."

Although Madoff's wealth management business ultimately grew into a multibillion-dollar operation, none of the major derivatives firms traded with him because they did not believe his numbers were real. None of the major Wall Street firms invested with him, and several high-ranking executives at those firms suspected his operations and claims were not legitimate. For example, hedge-fund manager Suzanne Murphy revealed that she balked at investing with Madoff because she did not believe there was enough volume to support his purported trading activity.

Clients such as Fairfield Greenwich Group and Union Bancaire Privée said that they had been given an "unusual degree of access" to evaluate and analyze Madoff's funds, and found nothing unusual with his investment portfolio.

The Central Bank of Ireland failed to spot Madoff's gigantic fraud when he started using Irish funds, and had to supply large amounts of information that should have been enough to enable the Irish regulator to uncover the fraud much earlier than late 2008 when he was finally arrested in New York City.

== Final weeks and collapse ==
The scheme began to unravel in the fall of 2008, when the 2008 financial crisis accelerated. Madoff had previously come close to collapse in the second half of 2005 after Bayou Group, a group of hedge funds, was exposed as a Ponzi scheme that used a bogus accounting firm to misrepresent its performance. By November, investors had requested $105 million in redemptions, though Madoff's Chase account had only $13 million. Madoff survived by moving money from his broker-dealer's account into his Ponzi scheme account. Eventually, he drew on $342 million from his broker-dealer's credit lines to keep the Ponzi scheme afloat through 2006. Markopolos wrote that he suspected Madoff was on the brink of insolvency as early as June 2005, when his team learned he was seeking loans from banks. By then, at least two major banks were no longer willing to lend money to their customers to invest it with Madoff.

In June 2008, Markopolos' team uncovered evidence that Madoff was accepting leveraged money, investing with borrowed funds in an attempt to boost growth. To Markopolos' mind, Madoff was running out of cash and needed to increase his promised returns to keep the scheme going. As it turned out, redemption requests from skittish investors ramped up in the wake of the collapse of Bear Stearns in March 2008. The trickle became a flood when Lehman Brothers was forced into bankruptcy in September, coinciding with the near-collapse of American International Group.

Because investors had high confidence in Madoff and viewed their accounts as liquid assets, they withdrew from Madoff first when needing funds to repay their own investors' redemptions. As the market's decline accelerated, investors tried to withdraw $7 billion from the firm. Unknown to them, however, Madoff had simply deposited his clients' money into his business account at Chase Manhattan Bank, and paid customers out of that account when they requested withdrawals. To pay off those investors, Madoff needed new money from other investors. However, in November, the balance in the account dropped to dangerously low levels. Only $300 million in new money had come in, but customers had withdrawn $320 million. He had barely enough in the account to meet his redemption payroll on November 19. Even with a rush of new investors who believed Madoff was one of the few funds that was still doing well, it still was not enough to keep up with the avalanche of withdrawals.

In the weeks prior to his arrest, Madoff struggled to keep the scheme afloat. In November 2008, Madoff Securities International (MSIL) in London made two fund transfers to Bernard Madoff Investment Securities of approximately $164 million. MSIL had neither customers nor clients, and there is no evidence that it conducted any trades on behalf of third parties.

Madoff received $250 million around December 1, 2008, from Carl J. Shapiro, a 95-year-old Boston philanthropist and entrepreneur who was one of Madoff's oldest friends and biggest financial backers. On December 5, he accepted $10 million from Martin Rosenman, president of Rosenman Family LLC. (Rosenman later sought to recover the never-invested $10 million, deposited in a Madoff account at JPMorgan, wired six days before Madoff's arrest. Judge Lifland ruled that Rosenman was "indistinguishable" from any other Madoff client, so there was no basis for giving him special treatment to recover funds. The judge separately declined to dismiss a lawsuit brought by Hadleigh Holdings, which claimed it entrusted $1 million to the Madoff firm three days before his arrest.)

Madoff asked others for money in the final weeks before his arrest, including Wall Street financier Kenneth Langone, whose office was sent a 19-page pitch book, purportedly created by the staff at the Fairfield Greenwich Group. Madoff said he was raising money for a new investment vehicle, between $500 million and $1 billion for exclusive clients, was moving quickly on the venture, and wanted an answer by the following week. Langone declined. In November, Fairfield announced the creation of a new feeder fund. However, it was far too little and far too late.

By the week after Thanksgiving 2008, Madoff knew he was at the end of his tether. The Chase account, which at one point in 2008 had well over $5 billion, was down to only $234 million. With overall bank lending nearly at a standstill, Madoff knew he could not even begin to borrow enough money to meet the outstanding redemption requests. On December 4, he told Frank DiPascali, who oversaw the Ponzi scheme's operation, that he was finished. He directed DiPascali to use the remaining balance in the Chase account to cash out the accounts of relatives and favored investors. On December 9, he told his brother Peter that he was on the brink of collapse.

The following morning, December 10, he suggested to his sons, Mark and Andrew, that the firm pay out over $170 million in bonuses two months ahead of schedule, from $200 million in assets that the firm still had. According to the complaint, Mark and Andrew, reportedly unaware of the firm's pending insolvency, confronted their father, asking him how the firm could pay bonuses to employees if it could not pay investors. At that point, Madoff asked his sons to follow him to his apartment, where he admitted that he was "finished" and that the asset management arm of the firm was in fact a Ponzi scheme – as he put it, "one big lie." Mark and Andrew then reported him to the authorities.

Madoff intended to take a week to wind up the firm's operations before his sons alerted authorities. Instead, Mark and Andrew immediately called lawyers. When the sons revealed their father's plan to use the remaining money to pay relatives and favored investors, their lawyers put them in touch with federal prosecutors and the SEC. Madoff was arrested the following morning.

== Investigation into co-conspirators ==
Investigators looked for others involved in the scheme, despite Madoff's assertion that he alone was responsible for the large-scale operation. Harry Susman, an attorney representing several clients of the firm, stated that "someone had to create the appearance that there were returns", and further suggested that there must have been a team buying and selling stocks, forging books, and filing reports. James Ratley, president of the Association of Certified Fraud Examiners said, "In order for him to have done this by himself, he would have had to have been at work night and day, no vacation and no time off. He would have had to nurture the Ponzi scheme daily. What happened when he was gone? Who handled it when somebody called in while he was on vacation and said, 'I need access to my money'?"

"Simply from an administrative perspective, the act of putting together the various account statements, which did show trading activity, has to involve a number of people. You would need office and support personnel, people who actually knew what the market prices were for the securities that were being traded. You would need accountants so that the internal documents reconcile with the documents being sent to customers at least on a superficial basis," said Tom Dewey, a securities lawyer.

Arvenlund wrote there was widespread suspicion of confederates to the fraud within Madoff's inner circle, but the secretive nature of the scheme made investigation difficult.

=== Alleged co-conspirators ===
- Jeffry Picower and his wife, Barbara, of Palm Beach, Florida, and Manhattan, had two dozen accounts. He was a lawyer, accountant, and investor who led buyouts of health-care and technology companies. Picower's foundation stated its investment portfolio with Madoff was valued at nearly $1 billion at one time. In June 2009, Irving Picard, the trustee liquidating Madoff's assets, filed a lawsuit against Picower in the U.S. Bankruptcy Court for the Southern District of New York (Manhattan), seeking the return of $7.2 billion in profits, alleging that Picower and his wife Barbara knew or should have known that their rates of return were "implausibly high", with some accounts showing annual returns ranging from 120% to more than 550% from 1996 through 1998, and 950% in 1999. On October 25, 2009, Picower, 67, was found dead of a massive heart attack at the bottom of his Palm Beach swimming pool. On December 17, 2010, it was announced that a settlement of $7.2 billion had been reached between Irving Picard and Barbara Picower, Picower's widow, the executor of the Picower estate to resolve the Madoff trustee suit, and repay losses in the Madoff fraud. It was the largest single forfeiture in American judicial history. "Barbara Picower has done the right thing," US Attorney Preet Bharara said.
- Stanley Chais, of the Brighton Company: On May 1, 2009, Picard filed a lawsuit against Stanley Chais. The complaint alleged he "knew or should have known" he was involved in a Ponzi scheme when his family investments with Madoff averaged a 40% return. It also claimed Chais was a primary beneficiary of the scheme for at least 30 years, allowing his family to withdraw more than $1 billion from their accounts since 1995. The SEC filed a similar civil suit mirroring these claims. On September 22, 2009, Chais was sued by California Attorney General Jerry Brown who was seeking $25 million in penalties as well as restitution for victims, saying the Beverly Hills investment manager was a 'middleman' in Madoff's Ponzi scheme. Chais died in September 2010. The widow, children, family, and estate of Chais settled with Picard in 2016 for $277 million. Picard's lawyers said the settlement covered all of Chais' estate, and substantially all of his widow's assets.
- Fairfield Greenwich Group, based in Greenwich, Connecticut, had a "Fairfield Sentry" fund—one of many feeder funds that gave investors portals to Madoff. On April 1, 2009, the Commonwealth of Massachusetts filed a civil action charging Fairfield Greenwich with fraud and breaching its fiduciary duty to clients by failing to provide promised due diligence on its investments. The complaint sought a fine and restitution to Massachusetts investors for losses and disgorgement of performance fees paid to Fairfield by those investors. It alleged that, in 2005, Madoff coached Fairfield staff about ways to answer questions from SEC attorneys who were looking into Markopolos' complaint about Madoff's operations. The fund settled with the Commonwealth in September 2009 for $8 million. On May 18, 2009, the hedge fund was sued by trustee Irving Picard, seeking a return of $3.2 billion during the period from 2002 to Madoff's arrest in December 2008. However, the money may already be in the hands of Fairfield's own clients, who are likely off-limits to Picard, since they weren't direct investors with Madoff. In May 2011 the liquidator for the funds settled with Picard for $1 billion.
- Peter Madoff, chief compliance officer, worked with his brother Bernie for more than 40 years, and ran the daily operations for 20 years. He helped create the computerized trading system. He agreed to pay more than $90 million that he does not have to settle claims that he participated in the Ponzi scheme, but Irving Picard agreed to forbear from seeking to enforce the consent judgment as long as Peter Madoff "makes reasonable efforts to cooperate with the Trustee in the Trustee's efforts to recover funds for the BLMIS Estate, including providing truthful information to the Trustee upon request." He was sentenced to 10 years in prison.
- Ruth Madoff, Bernard's wife, agreed as part of his sentencing to keep from the federal government only $2.5 million of her claim of more than $80 million in assets, and to give up all of her possessions. The $2.5 million was not, however, protected from civil legal actions against her pursued by a court-appointed trustee liquidating Madoff's assets, or from investor lawsuits. On July 29, 2009, she was sued by trustee Irving Picard who sought to recover from her $45 million in Madoff funds that were being used to support her "life of splendor" on the gains from the fraud committed by her husband. On November 25, 2008, she had withdrawn $5.5 million, and $10 million on December 10, 2008, from her brokerage account at Cohmad, a feeder fund that had an office in Madoff's headquarters and was part-owned by him. In November she also received $2 million from her husband's London office. She has been seen riding the N.Y.C. subway, and did not attend her husband's sentencing. In May 2019, 77-year-old Ruth Madoff agreed to pay $594,000 ($250,000 in cash, and $344,000 of trusts for two of her grandchildren), and to surrender her remaining assets when she dies, to settle claims by Irving Picard. She is required to provide reports to Picard about her expenditures often, as to any purchase over $100, to ensure she does not have any hidden bank accounts. The case is Picard v. Madoff, 1:09-ap-1391, U.S. Bankruptcy Court, Southern District of New York (Manhattan).
- Madoff's sons, Mark and Andrew Madoff, worked in the legitimate trading arm in the New York office, but also raised money marketing the Madoff funds. Their assets were frozen on March 31, 2009. The two became estranged from their father and mother in the wake of the fraud, which some contended was a charade to protect their assets from litigation. On October 2, 2009, a civil lawsuit was filed against them by trustee Irving Picard for a judgment in the aggregate amount of at least $198,743,299. Peter Madoff and daughter Shana were also defendants. On December 11, 2010, the second anniversary of Madoff's arrest, Mark Madoff was found having committed suicide and hanging from a ceiling pipe in the living room of his SoHo loft apartment. Andrew Madoff died September 3, 2014, from cancer. He was 48, and had reconciled with his mother prior to his death. Told that his father wanted to speak with him and explain what he had done, Andrew told Matt Lauer of the Today Show he wasn't interested. In June 2017, Irving Picard settled with the sons' estates for more than $23 million, stripping the estates of Andrew and Mark Madoff of "all assets, cash, and other proceeds" of their father's fraud, leaving them with a respective $2 million and $1.75 million.
- Tremont Group Holdings started its first Madoff-only fund in 1997. That group managed several funds marketed under the Re Select Broad Market Fund. In July 2011, Tremont Group Holdings settled with Irving Picard for more than $1 billion.
- The Maxam Fund invested through Tremont. Sandra L. Manzke, founder of Maxam Capital, had her assets temporarily frozen by the same Connecticut court. In August 2013, Irving Picard reached a $98 million settlement with Maxam Absolute Return Fund.
- Cohmad Securities Corp., of which Madoff owned a 10–20% stake: The brokerage firm listed its address as Madoff's firm's address in New York City. Its chairman, Maurice J. "Sonny" Cohn, his daughter and COO Marcia Beth Cohn, and Robert M. Jaffe, a broker at the firm, were accused by the SEC of four counts of civil fraud, "knowingly or recklessly disregarding facts indicating that Madoff was operating a fraud," and they settled that suit with the SEC in 2010. Another lawsuit filed by bankruptcy trustee Irving Picard sought funds for Madoff victims. In November 2016, Picard announced that the estate of "Sonny" Cohn, his widow Marilyn Cohn, and their daughter had agreed to settle with Picard for $32.1 million.
- Madoff Securities International Ltd. in London; individual and entities related to it were sued by Irving Picard and Stephen J. Akers, a joint liquidator of Madoff's London operation, in the United Kingdom's High Court of Justice Commercial Court.
- J. Ezra Merkin, a prominent investment advisor and philanthropist, was sued for his role in running a "feeder fund" for Madoff. On April 6, 2009, New York Attorney General Andrew Cuomo filed civil fraud charges against Merkin alleging he "betrayed hundreds of investors" by moving $2.4 billion of clients' money to Madoff without their knowledge. The complaint stated he lied about putting the money with Madoff, failed to disclose conflicts of interest, and collected over $470 million in fees for his three hedge funds, Ascot Partners LP with Ascot Fund Ltd., Gabriel Capital Corp., and Ariel Fund Ltd. He promised he would actively manage the money, but instead, he misguided investors about his Madoff investments in quarterly reports, in investor presentations, and in conversations with investors. "Merkin held himself out to investors as an investing guru [...] In reality, Merkin was but a master marketer."
- Carl J. Shapiro, women's clothing entrepreneur, self-made millionaire, and philanthropist, and one of Madoff's oldest friends and biggest financial backers, who helped him start his investment firm in 1960. He was never in the finance business. In 1971, Shapiro sold his business, Kay Windsor, Inc., for $20 million. Investing most of it with Madoff, that sum grew to hundreds of millions of dollars and possibly to more than $1 billion. Shapiro personally lost about $400 million, $250 million of which he gave to Madoff 10 days before Madoff's arrest. His foundation lost more than $100 million.
- The Hadon Organisation, a UK-based company involved in mergers and acquisitions: Between 2001 and 2008 The Hadon Organisation established very close ties with Madoff Securities International Ltd. in London.
- David G. Friehling, the sole practitioner at Friehling & Horowitz CPAs, waived indictment and pleaded not guilty to criminal charges on July 10, 2009. He agreed to proceed without having the evidence in the criminal case against him reviewed by a grand jury at a hearing before U.S. District Judge Alvin Hellerstein in Manhattan. Friehling was charged on March 18, 2009, with securities fraud, aiding and abetting investment adviser fraud, and four counts of filing false audit reports with the SEC. On November 3, 2009, Friehling pled guilty to the charges. His involvement in the scheme made it the largest accounting fraud in history, dwarfing the $11 billion accounting fraud masterminded by Bernard Ebbers at WorldCom. In May 2015, U.S. District Judge Laura Taylor Swain sentenced Friehling to one year of home detention and one year of supervised release, with Friehling avoiding prison because he cooperated extensively with federal prosecutors and because he had been unaware of the extent of Madoff's crimes. Swain suggested that Friehling be forced to pay part of the overall $130 million forfeiture arising from the fraud.
- Frank DiPascali, who referred to himself as "director of options trading" and as "chief financial officer" at Madoff Securities, pled guilty on August 11, 2009, to 10 counts: conspiracy, securities fraud, investment advisor fraud, mail fraud, wire fraud, perjury, income tax evasion, international money laundering, falsifying books and records of a broker-dealer and investment advisor. He agreed to "connect the dots" and to "name names", with sentencing originally scheduled for May 2010. Prosecutors sought more than $170 billion in forfeiture, the same amount sought from Madoff, which represents funds deposited by investors and later disbursed to other investors. The same day, an SEC civil complaint was filed against DiPascali. On May 7, 2015, while still awaiting sentencing, DiPascali died of lung cancer.
- Daniel Bonventre, former operations director for Bernard Madoff Investment Securities. He was convicted on 21 counts, and sentenced to 10 years in jail.
- Joann Crupi (Westfield, NJ; sentenced to six years in prison) and Annette Bongiorno (Boca Raton, FL; sentenced to six years in prison), both back office employees, were arrested in November 2010. "Authorities previously said Bongiorno was a staff supervisor and was responsible for answering questions from Madoff's clients about their purported investments. They allege she oversaw the fabrication of documents", according to the Associated Press.
- Jerome O'Hara (sentenced to two and a half years in prison) and George Perez (sentenced to two and a half years in prison), long-time employees of Bernard L. Madoff Investment Securities LLC (BLMIS), were charged in an indictment in November 2010, and in a 33-count superseding indictment on October 1, 2012.
- Enrica Cotellessa-Pitz, controller of Bernard L. Madoff Investment Securities LLC, but not a licensed certified public accountant: Her signature is on checks from BLMIS to Cohmad Securities Corp. representing commission payments. She was the liaison between the SEC and BLMIS regarding the firm's financial statements. The SEC has removed the statements from its website. She pled guilty to her role.

== Charges and sentencing ==
The criminal case is U.S. v. Madoff, 1:08-mJ-02735.

The SEC case is Securities and Exchange Commission v. Madoff, 1:08-cv- 10791, both U.S. District Court, Southern District of New York. The cases against Fairfield Greenwich Group et al. were consolidated as 09-118 in U.S. District Court for the Southern District of New York (Manhattan).

While awaiting sentencing, Madoff met with the SEC's Inspector General, H. David Kotz, who was conducting an investigation into how regulators failed to detect the fraud despite numerous red flags. Because of concerns of improper conduct by Inspector General Kotz in conducting the Madoff investigation, Inspector General David C. Williams of the U.S. Postal Service was brought in to conduct an independent outside review of Kotz's actions. The Williams Report questioned Kotz's work on the Madoff investigation, because Kotz was a "very good friend" with Markopolos. Investigators were not able to determine when Kotz and Markopolos became friends. A violation of the ethics rules took place if their friendship was concurrent with Kotz's investigation of Madoff.

Former SEC chairman Harvey Pitt estimated the actual net fraud to be between $10 and $17 billion, because it does not include the fictional returns credited to the Madoff's customer accounts.

=== Criminal complaint ===
U.S. v. Madoff, 08-MAG-02735.

The original criminal complaint estimated that investors lost $50 billion through the scheme, though The Wall Street Journal reports "that figure includes the alleged false profits that Mr. Madoff's firm reported to its customers for decades. It is unclear exactly how much investors deposited into the firm." He was originally charged with a single count of securities fraud and faced up to 20 years in prison, and a fine of $5 million if convicted.

Court papers indicate that Madoff's firm had about 4,800 investment client accounts as of November 30, 2008, and issued statements for that month reporting that client accounts held a total balance of about $65 billion, but actually "held only a small fraction" of that balance for clients.

Madoff was arrested by the Federal Bureau of Investigation (FBI) on December 11, 2008, on a criminal charge of securities fraud. According to the criminal complaint, the previous day he had told his sons that his business was "a giant Ponzi scheme". They called a friend for advice, Martin Flumenbaum, a lawyer, who called federal prosecutors and the SEC on their behalf. FBI Agent Theodore Cacioppi made a house call. "We are here to find out if there is an innocent explanation," Cacioppi said quietly. The 70-year-old financier paused, then said: "There is no innocent explanation." He had "paid investors with money that was not there". Madoff was released on the same day of his arrest after posting $10 million bail. Madoff and his wife surrendered their passports, and he was subject to travel restrictions, a 7 p.m. curfew at his co-op, and electronic monitoring as a condition of bail. Although Madoff only had two co-signers for his $10 million bail, his wife and his brother Peter, rather than the four required, a judge allowed him free on bail, but ordered him confined to his apartment. Madoff reportedly received death threats that were referred to the FBI, and the SEC referred to fears of "harm or flight" in its request for Madoff to be confined to his Upper East Side apartment. Cameras monitored his apartment's doors, its communication devices sent signals to the FBI, and his wife was required to pay for additional security.

Apart from 'Bernard L. Madoff' and 'Bernard L. Madoff Investment Securities LLC ("BMIS")', the order to freeze all activities also forbade trading from the companies Madoff Securities International Ltd. ("Madoff International") and Madoff Ltd.

On January 5, 2009, prosecutors requested that the Court revoke his bail, after Madoff and his wife allegedly violated the court-ordered asset freeze by mailing jewelry worth up to $1 million to relatives, including their sons and Madoff's brother. It was also noted that $173 million in signed checks had been found in Madoff's office desk after he had been arrested. His sons reported the mailings to prosecutors. Up to that point, Madoff was thought to be cooperating with prosecutors. The following week, Judge Ellis refused the government's request to revoke Madoff's bail, but required as a condition of bail that Madoff make an inventory of personal items and that his mail be searched.

On March 10, 2009, the U.S. Attorney for the Southern District of New York filed an 11-count criminal information charging Madoff with 11 federal crimes: securities fraud, investment adviser fraud, mail fraud, wire fraud, three counts of money laundering, false statements, perjury, making false filings with the SEC, and theft from an employee benefit plan. The complaint stated that Madoff had defrauded his clients of almost $65 billion – thus spelling out the largest Ponzi scheme in history, as well as the largest investor fraud committed by a single person.

Madoff pleaded guilty to three counts of money laundering. Prosecutors alleged that he used the London Office, Madoff Securities International Ltd. to launder more than $250 million of client money by transferring client money from the investment-advisory business in New York to London, and then back to the U.S., to support the U.S. trading operation of Bernard L. Madoff Investment Securities LLC. Madoff gave the appearance that he was trading in Europe for his clients.

=== Plea proceeding ===
On March 12, 2009, Madoff appeared in court in a plea proceeding, and pleaded guilty to all charges. There was no plea agreement between the government and Madoff; he simply pleaded guilty and signed a waiver of indictment. The charges carried a maximum sentence of 150 years in prison, as well as mandatory restitution and fines up to twice the gross gain or loss derived from the offenses. If the government's estimate were correct, Madoff would have to pay $7.2 billion in restitution. A month earlier, Madoff settled the SEC's civil suit against him. He accepted a lifetime ban from the securities industry, and also agreed to pay an undisclosed fine.

In his pleading allocution, Madoff admitted to running a Ponzi scheme and expressed regret for his "criminal acts". He stated that he had begun his scheme some time in the early 1990s. He wished to satisfy his clients' expectations of high returns he had promised, even though it was during an economic recession. He admitted that he hadn't invested any of his clients' money since the inception of his scheme. Instead, he merely deposited the money into his business account at Chase Manhattan Bank. He admitted to false trading activities masked by foreign transfers and false SEC returns. When clients requested account withdrawals, he paid them from the Chase account, claiming the profits were the result of his own unique "split-strike conversion strategy". He said he had every intention of terminating the scheme, but it proved "difficult, and ultimately impossible" to extricate himself. He eventually reconciled himself to being exposed as a fraud.

Only two of at least 25 victims who had requested to be heard at the hearing spoke in open court against accepting Madoff's plea of guilt.

Judge Denny Chin accepted his guilty plea and remanded him to incarceration at the Manhattan Metropolitan Correctional Center until sentencing. Chin said that Madoff was now a substantial flight risk given his age, wealth, and the possibility of spending the rest of his life in prison.

Madoff's attorney, Ira Sorkin, filed an appeal, to return him back to his "penthouse arrest", await sentencing, and to reinstate his bail conditions, declaring he would be more amenable to cooperate with the government's investigation, and prosecutors filed a notice in opposition. On March 20, 2009, the appellate court denied his request.

On June 26, 2009, Chin ordered Madoff to forfeit $170 million in assets. His wife Ruth was to relinquish her claim to $80 million worth of assets, leaving her with $2.5 million in cash. The settlement did not prevent the SEC and Irving Picard from continuing to make claims against Ruth Madoff's funds in the future. Madoff had earlier requested to shield $70 million in assets for Ruth, arguing that it was unconnected to the fraud scheme.

=== Sentencing, prison life and death ===
Prosecutors recommended a prison sentence of 150 years, the maximum possible under federal sentencing guidelines. They informed Chin that Irving Picard, the trustee overseeing bankruptcy proceedings for the Madoff organization, had indicated that "Mr. Madoff has not provided meaningful cooperation or assistance." The Bureau of US Prisons had recommended 50 years, while defense lawyer Ira Sorkin had recommended 12 years, arguing that Madoff had confessed. The judge granted Madoff permission to wear his personal clothing at sentencing.

On June 29, Judge Chin sentenced Madoff to 150 years in prison, as recommended by the prosecution. Chin said he had not received any mitigating letters from friends or family testifying to Madoff's good deeds, saying that "the absence of such support is telling." Commentators noted that this was in contrast to other high-profile white collar trials such as those of Andrew Fastow, Jeffrey Skilling, and Bernard Ebbers who were known for their philanthropy and/or cooperation to help victims; however, Madoff's victims included several charities and foundations, and the only person who pleaded for mercy was his defense lawyer Ira Sorkin.

Chin called the fraud "unprecedented" and "staggering", and stated that the sentence would deter others from committing similar frauds. He stated, "Here the message must be sent that Mr. Madoff's crimes were extraordinarily evil." Many victims, some of whom had lost their life savings, applauded the sentence. Chin agreed with prosecutors' contention that the fraud began at some point in the 1980s. He also noted Madoff's crimes were "off the charts" since federal sentencing guidelines for fraud only go up to $400 million in losses; Madoff swindled his investors out of several times that. Prosecutors estimated that, at the very least, Madoff was responsible for a loss of $13 billion, more than 32 times the federal cap; the commonly quoted loss of $65 billion is more than 162 times the cap.

Chin said "I have a sense Mr. Madoff has not done all that he could do or told all that he knows," noting that Madoff failed to identify accomplices, making it more difficult for prosecutors to build cases against others. Chin dismissed Sorkin's plea for leniency, stating that Madoff made substantial loans to family members and moved $15 million from the firm to his wife's account shortly before confessing. Picard also said that Madoff's failure to provide substantial assistance complicated efforts to locate assets. A former federal prosecutor suggested Madoff would have had the possibility of a sentence with parole if he fully cooperated with investigators, but Madoff's silence implied that there were other accomplices in the fraud, which led the judge to impose the maximum sentence. Chin also ordered Madoff to pay $170 billion in restitution.

Madoff apologized to his victims at the sentencing, saying, "I have left a legacy of shame, as some of my victims have pointed out, to my family and my grandchildren. This is something I will live in for the rest of my life. I'm sorry.... I know that doesn't help you."

Madoff was incarcerated at Butner Federal Correctional Complex outside Raleigh, North Carolina. His inmate number was #61727-054.

On July 28, 2009, he gave his first jailhouse interview to Joseph Cotchett and Nancy Fineman, attorneys from San Francisco, because they threatened to sue his wife, Ruth, on behalf of several investors who lost fortunes. During the 4 1/2 hour session, he "answered every one of [the attorneys'] questions", and expressed remorse, according to Cotchett.

Madoff died of natural causes in a federal prison hospital in 2021.

== Recovery of funds ==
Madoff's combined assets were worth about $826 million at the time that they were frozen. Madoff provided a confidential list of his and his firm's assets to the SEC on December 31, 2008, which was disclosed on March 13, 2009, in a court filing. Madoff had no IRAs, no 401(k), no Keogh plan, no other pension plan, and no annuities. He owned less than a combined $200,000 in securities in Lehman Brothers, Morgan Stanley, Fidelity, Bear Stearns, and M&T. No offshore or Swiss bank accounts were listed.

On March 17, 2009, a prosecutor filed a document listing more assets, including $2.6 million in jewelry and about 35 sets of watches and cufflinks, more than $30 million in loans owed to the couple by their sons, and Ruth Madoff's interest in real estate funds sponsored by Sterling Equities, whose partners included Fred Wilpon. Ruth Madoff and Peter Madoff invested as "passive limited partners" in real estate funds sponsored by the company, as well as other venture investments. Assets also included the Madoffs' interest in Hoboken Radiology LLC in Hoboken, New Jersey; Delivery Concepts LLC, an online food ordering service in midtown Manhattan that operated as "delivery.com"; an interest in Madoff La Brea LLC; an interest in the restaurant, PJ Clarke's on the Hudson LLC; and Boca Raton, Florida-based Viager II LLC.

On March 2, 2009, Judge Louis Stanton modified an existing freeze order to surrender assets Madoff owned: his securities firm, real estate, artwork, and entertainment tickets, and granted a request by prosecutors that the existing freeze remain in place for the Manhattan apartment, and vacation homes in Montauk, New York, and Palm Beach, Florida. He also agreed to surrender his interest in Primex Holdings LLC, a joint venture between Madoff Securities and several large brokerages, designed to replicate the auction process on the New York Stock Exchange. Madoff's April 14, 2009, opening day New York Mets tickets were sold for $7,500 on eBay.

On April 13, 2009, a Connecticut judge dissolved the temporary asset freeze from March 30, 2009, and issued an order for Fairfield Greenwich Group executive Walter Noel to post property pledges of $10 million against his Greenwich home and $2 million against Jeffrey Tucker's. Noel agreed to the attachment on his house "with no findings, including no finding of liability or wrongdoing". Andres Piedrahita's assets continued to remain temporarily frozen because he was never served with the complaint. The principals were all involved in a lawsuit filed by the town of Fairfield, Connecticut, pension funds, which lost $42 million. The pension fund case was Retirement Program for Employees of the Town of Fairfield v. Madoff, FBT-CV-09-5023735-S, Superior Court of Connecticut (Bridgeport). Maxam Capital and other firms that allegedly fed Madoff's fund, which could allow Fairfield to recover up to $75 million, were also part of the dissolution and terms.

Professor John Coffee, of Columbia University Law School, said that much of Madoff's money may be in offshore funds. The SEC believed keeping the assets secret would prevent them from being seized by foreign regulators and foreign creditors.

The Montreal Gazette reported on January 12, 2010, that there were unrecovered Madoff assets in Canada.

In December 2010, the widow Barbara Picower and others reached an agreement with Irving Picard to return $7.2 billion from the estate of her deceased husband Jeffry Picower to other investors in the fraud. It was the largest single forfeiture in American judicial history.

In connection with the victim compensation process, on December 14 and 17, 2012, the Government filed motions requesting that the Court find restitution to be impracticable, thereby permitting the Government to distribute to victims the more than $2.35 billion forfeited to date as part of its investigation through the remission process, in accordance with Department of Justice regulations. Richard C. Breeden was retained to serve as Special Master on behalf of the Department of Justice to administer the process of compensating the victims through the Madoff Victim Fund.

The Madoff Recovery Initiative reports $14.377 billion in recoveries and settlement agreements as of December 18, 2020.

== Affected clients ==
On February 4, 2009, the U.S. Bankruptcy Court in Manhattan released a 162-page client list with at least 13,500 different accounts, but without listing the amounts invested. Individual investors who invested through Fairfield Greenwich Group, Ascot Partners, and Chais Investments were not included on the list.

Clients included banks, hedge funds, charities, universities, and wealthy individuals who had disclosed about $41 billion invested with Bernard L. Madoff Investment Securities LLC, according to a Bloomberg News tally, which may have included double counting of investors in feeder funds.

Although Madoff filed a report with the SEC in 2008 stating that his advisory business had only 11–25 clients and about $17.1 billion in assets, thousands of investors reported losses, and Madoff estimated the fund's assets at $50 billion.

Other notable clients included former Salomon Brothers economist Henry Kaufman, Steven Spielberg, Jeffrey Katzenberg, screenwriter Eric Roth, actors Kevin Bacon, Kyra Sedgwick, John Malkovich, Zsa Zsa Gabor, and Rue McClanahan, politician Frank Lautenberg, Mortimer Zuckerman, Baseball Hall of Fame pitcher Sandy Koufax, the Wilpon family (former owners of the New York Mets), broadcaster Larry King and World Trade Center developer Larry Silverstein. The Elie Wiesel Foundation for Humanity lost $15.2 million, and Wiesel and his wife, Marion, lost their life savings.

=== Largest stake-holders ===
According to The Wall Street Journal the investors with the largest potential losses, including feeder funds, were:

- Fairfield Greenwich Group, $7.5 billion
- Tremont Capital Management, which was owned by MassMutual, $3.3 billion
- Banco Santander, $2.87 billion
- Bank Medici, $2.1 billion
- ALMUS Partners, $1.65 billion
- Access International Advisors, $1.4 billion
- Fortis, $1.35 billion
- HSBC, $1 billion

The potential losses of these eight investors total $21.32 billion.

The feeder fund Thema International Fund as of November 30, 2008, had a then-purported net asset value invested in the fund of $1.1 billion.

Eleven investors had potential losses between $100 million and $1 billion:

- Natixis SA
- Carl J. Shapiro
- Royal Bank of Scotland Group PLC
- BNP Paribas
- BBVA
- Man Group PLC
- Reichmuth & Co.
- Nomura Holdings
- Maxam Capital Management
- EIM SA
- Union Bancaire Privée

The fund Defender Limited has a $523 million claim in the BLMIS liquidation.

Twenty-three investors with potential losses of $500,000 to $100 million were also listed, with a total potential loss of $540 million. The grand total potential loss in The Wall Street Journal table was $26.9 billion.

Some investors amended their initial estimates of losses to include only their original investment, since the profits Madoff reported were most likely fraudulent. Yeshiva University, for instance, said its actual incurred loss was its invested $14.5 million, not the $110 million initially estimated, which included falsified profits reported to the university by Madoff.

==== IRS penalties ====
It was estimated the potential tax penalties for foundations invested with Madoff were $1 billion.

Although foundations are exempt from federal income taxes, they are subject to an excise tax, for failing to vet Madoff's proposed investments properly, to heed red flags, or to diversify prudently. Penalties may range from 10% of the amount invested during a tax year, to 25% if they fail to try to recover the funds. The foundation's officers, directors, and trustees faced up to a 15% penalty, with up to $20,000 fines for individual managers, per investment.

== Impact and aftermath ==
=== Criminal charges against Aurelia Finance ===
Criminal charges against five directors proceeded against Swiss wealth manager Aurelia Finance, which lost an alleged $800 million of client money. The directors' assets were frozen. In September 2015 they paid "substantial compensation" to settle the criminal complaints.

=== Grupo Santander ===
Clients primarily located in South America who invested with Madoff through the Spanish bank Grupo Santander, filed a class action against Santander in Miami. Santander proposed a settlement that would give the clients $2 billion worth of preferred stock in Santander based on each client's original investment. The shares pay a 2% dividend. Seventy percent of the Madoff/Santander investors accepted the offer.

=== Union Bancaire Privee ===
On May 8, 2009, a lawsuit against UBP was filed on behalf of New York investor Andrea Barron in the U.S. District Court in Manhattan. Despite being a victim of Bernard Madoff's fraud, the bank offered in March 2009 to compensate eligible investors 50 percent of the money they initially invested with Madoff. In March 2010, the US District Court for the Southern District of New York threw out the class action against Union Bancaire Privée that had been brought under state law, holding that private securities class actions alleging misrepresentations or omissions must be brought under the federal securities laws.

On December 6, 2010, Union Bancaire Privée announced it had reached a settlement with Irving Picard, the trustee for Madoff Investment Securities. UBP agreed to pay as much as $500 million to resolve the trustee's claims. UBP was the first bank to settle the Madoff trustee's claim. With the settlement, the trustee agreed to discharge his "clawback" claims against UBP, its affiliates, and clients.

=== Bank Medici ===
Bank Medici is an Austrian bank founded by Sonja Kohn, who met Madoff in 1985 while living in New York. Ninety percent of the bank's income was generated from Madoff investments.

In 1992 Kohn introduced Madoff to Mario Benbassat, founder of Genevalor Benbassat & Cie, and his two sons in New York, as a possible source of new funds for Madoff. Genevalor set up five European feeder funds, including $1.1 billion Irish fund Thema International Fund set up by Thema Asset Management, a British Virgin Islands-based company 55 per cent owned by Genevalor, and invested almost $2 billion with Madoff. Thema International paid fees of 1.25 per cent ($13.75 million a year) to Genevalor Benbasset & Cie. The Wall Street Journal reported in December 2008 that the company was said to be a key player distributing Madoff investments in the Madoff investment scandal.

In December 2008, Medici reported that two of its funds—Herald USA Fund and Herald Luxemburg Fund—were exposed to Madoff losses. On January 2, 2009, FMA, the Austria banking regulator, took control of Bank Medici and appointed a supervisor to control the bank. Bank Medici was sued by its customers both in the U.S. and in Austria. The Vienna State Prosecutor launched a criminal investigation of Bank Medici and Kohn, who had invested an estimated $2.1 billion with Madoff. On May 28, 2009, Bank Medici lost its Austrian banking license. Kohn and the bank were under investigation, but she was not accused of criminal wrongdoing.

=== The Innocence Project ===
The Innocence Project was partly funded by the JEHT Foundation, a private charity backed by a wealthy couple, Ken and Jeanne Levy-Church, financed with Madoff's mythical money. Jeanne Levy-Church's losses forced her to shut down both her foundation and that of her parents, the Betty and Norman F. Levy Foundation, which lost $244 million. JEH helped the less fortunate, especially ex-convicts. (See Participants in the Madoff investment scandal: Norman F. Levy.)

=== Westport National Bank ===
In April 2010, Connecticut Attorney General Richard Blumenthal sued the Westport National Bank and Robert L. Silverman for "effectively aiding and abetting" Madoff's fraud. The suit sought recovery of $16.2 million, including the fees that the bank collected as custodian of customers' holding in Madoff investments. Silverman's 240 clients invested about $10 million with Madoff using the bank as the custodian. The bank denied any wrongdoing.

=== Thema International Fund ===
In September 2017 in a case before the Irish High Court, Thema International Fund agreed to pay $687 million to resolve a trustee lawsuit brought on behalf of the fraud victims resulting from Madoff's frauds.

=== The Picower Foundation ===
The Picower Foundation, created in 2002, was one of the nation's leading philanthropies that supported groups such as the Picower Institute for Learning and Memory at the Massachusetts Institute of Technology, Human Rights First, the New York Public Library and the Children's Health Fund. It was listed as the 71st-largest in the nation by the Council on Foundations. The foundation reportedly invested $1 billion with Madoff. Jeffry Picower was a friend of Bernard Madoff for 30 years. The Picower Foundation, along with other smaller charities that invested with Madoff, announced in December 2008 that they would be closing.

=== Peter Madoff ===
In June 2012, Madoff's brother Peter was "expected to appear in Federal District Court in Manhattan and admit to, among other things, falsifying records, making false statements to securities regulators and obstructing the work of the Internal Revenue Service." In December 2012 he was sentenced to 10 years in prison for his involvement in the Ponzi scheme.

=== Suicides ===
==== René-Thierry Magon de la Villehuchet ====
On December 23, 2008, one of the founders of Access International Advisors LLC, René-Thierry Magon de la Villehuchet, was found dead in his company office on Madison Avenue in New York City. His left wrist was slit, and de la Villehuchet had taken sleeping pills, in what appeared to be a suicide.

He lived in New Rochelle, New York and came from a prominent French family. Although no suicide note was found at the scene, his brother Bertrand in France received a note shortly after his death in which René-Thierry expressed remorse and a feeling of responsibility for the loss of his investors' money. The FBI and SEC did not believe de la Villehuchet was involved in the fraud. Harry Markopolos said he had met with de La Villehuchet several years before, and had warned him that Madoff might be breaking the law. In 2002, Access invested about 45% of its $1.2 billion under management with Madoff. By 2008, Access managed $3 billion and raised its proportion of funds invested with Madoff to about 75%. De la Villehuchet had also invested all of his wealth and 20% of that of his brother, Bertrand, with Madoff. Bertrand said that René-Thierry did not know Madoff, but the connection was through René-Thierry's partner in AIA, French banker Patrick Littaye.

==== William Foxton ====
On February 10, 2009, highly decorated British soldier William Foxton, OBE, 65, shot himself in a park in Southampton, England, having lost all of his family's savings. He had invested in the Herald USA Fund and Herald Luxembourg Fund, feeder funds for Madoff from Bank Medici in Austria.

==== Mark Madoff ====
Madoff's elder son, Mark Madoff, was found dead on December 11, 2010, two years to the day after he turned his father in. He was found hanged with a dog leash inside his New York apartment in an apparent suicide, but authorities said he left no suicide note.

Mark had unsuccessfully sought a Wall Street trading job after the scandal broke, and it was reported that he was distraught over the possibility of criminal charges, as federal prosecutors were making criminal tax-fraud probes. Among the many Madoff family members being sued by the court-appointed trustee Irving Picard were Mark's two young children.

In his lawsuit, Picard stated that Mark and other Madoff family members improperly earned tens of millions of dollars, through "fictitious and backdated transactions", and falsely documented loans to buy real estate that weren't repaid. Picard also argued that Mark was in a position to recognize the fraud of his father's firm, as Mark was a co-director of trading, was the designated head of the firm in his father's absence, and held several securities licenses—Series 7, 24 and 55 with the Financial Industry Regulatory Authority. However, he worked in a division of Madoff's company distinct from the one involved with Madoff's fraud, which has not been accused of any wrongdoing.

==== Sondra Wiener and husband ====
Madoff's sister, Sondra Wiener, and her husband, were found dead in their Boynton Beach home on February 17, 2022 from an apparent murder–suicide, according to the Palm Beach County Sheriff's Office. The name of Wiener's husband was not revealed because his family chose to invoke a law that guarantees the right to privacy of crime victims. Authorities have not provided details of who shot whom in the apparent murder–suicide.

In 2009, Sondra's son David said that Madoff had defrauded his mother, and that it was "very painful."

=== U.S. Securities and Exchange Commission ===
Following the exposure of the Madoff investment scandal, the SEC's inspector general conducted an internal investigation into the agency's failures to uncover the scheme despite a series of red flags and tips. In September 2009, the SEC released a 477-page report on how the SEC missed these red flags, and identified repeated opportunities for SEC examiners to find the fraud and revealed how ineffective their efforts were. In response to the recommendations in the report, eight SEC employees were disciplined; none were fired.

=== JPMorgan Chase ===
On January 7, 2014, Forbes magazine and other news outlets reported that the bank JPMorgan Chase, "where Madoff kept the bank account at the center of his fraud", would pay a settlement of $1.7 billion. This resolved any potential criminal case against the bank arising from the Madoff scandal. JPMorgan entered into a deferred prosecution agreement with federal prosecutors to resolve two felony charges of violating the Bank Secrecy Act. The bank admitted to failing to file a "Suspicious Activity Report" after red flags about Madoff were raised, which, prosecutors alleged, did not have adequate anti-money laundering compliance procedures in place.

=== Payouts ===
Bloomberg Business News reported in 2016 that investors of approximately $2.5 billion of funds had made no effort to claim their lost funds. Analysts suspected that these parties remained silent because their investments were from illegal activities such as drug dealing or tax evasion, or because they had civil liabilities in the United States and did not wish to subject themselves to the jurisdiction of the U.S. courts.

Irving Picard and his team have been overseeing the liquidation of Bernard Madoff's firm in bankruptcy court, and by mid-2019 had recovered over $13 billion—about 76 percent of approved claims—by suing those who profited from the scheme, whether they knew of the scheme or not. Kathy Bazoian Phelps, a lawyer at Diamond McCarthy, said "That kind of recovery is extraordinary and atypical," as clawbacks in such schemes range from 5 percent to 30 percent, and many victims do not get anything. Picard has successfully pursued not only investors, but also spouses and estates of those who profited, such as the wife of Bernard Madoff (Ruth Madoff), the widow and estate of the deceased Stanley Chais, and the widow and estate of the deceased Jeffry Picower, with whom he reached a $7.2 billion settlement (the largest civil forfeiture payment in US history). "You don't take this job if you're thin-skinned," Picard said.

In May 2019 Ruth Madoff settled with Picard, agreeing to surrender $250,000 in cash and another $344,000 in trusts for her grandchildren.

== See also ==
- 2008 financial crisis
- The Wizard of Lies

== Sources ==
- Henriques, Diana (2011). The Wizard of Lies. Times Books. ISBN 9781250007438.
