= Aurelia Finance =

- Company type: private bank and fund-management company
- Headquarters: Geneva, Switzerland
- Services: feeder fund to Bernie Madoff

Aurelia Finance SA was a private bank and fund-management company in Geneva, Switzerland that was set up as a feeder fund to Bernie Madoff's illegal Ponzi scheme.

Aurelia managed 1.7 billion Swiss francs of clients' money, and advised clients to invest in the Hermes World Fund, a Madoff feeder fund which was listed in Dublin in January 2004, as part of a "conservative" portfolio.

== Madoff ==
It placed assets of its 800 million Swiss francs ($758 million) Hermes World Fund in investments with Bernard Madoff.

Irving Picard, the trustee charged with recovering money for Madoff fraud victims, alleged that in September 2008 when a JPMorgan Structured Investments Distribution Marketing division employee disclosed JPMorgan plans to redeem its money, he was threatened by employees of Aurelia Finance. Picard asserted in a complaint: "The Aurelia Finance representatives repeatedly opposed [JP Morgan's] plan. At two points in the conversation, the Aurelia Finance representatives made threats ... referring to 'Colombian friends' who could 'cause havoc' and telling [the JPMorgan employee] 'we know where to find you'.” JPMorgan reported the threats to the UK's Serious Organised Crime Agency in October 2008 by filing a Suspicious Activity Report, concerned that "Colombian drug money" was involved in the Madoff firm.

Aurelia lost an estimated $800 million of clients' money by investing in Bernard Madoff's $65 billion Ponzi scheme, uncovered in December 2008.

== Post-Madoff ==
In April 2009, all five directors of Aurelia's board were charged by a Geneva magistrate with criminal mismanagement of client assets, and with enriching themselves on management fees, finder fees, and commissions paid for fictitious returns that were never verified. They all then resigned from the board. Cattaneo and Stepczynski retained executive roles at the bank, however. The company had one sole director as of 4 June 2009, Gerhard Auer.

In November 2009, prosecutors leveled money laundering charges at Stepczynski after the bank he tried to use to transfer millions of francs out of Switzerland informed the authorities. A Geneva examining magistrate then froze the assets of all five former Aurelia directors.

On 4 September 2015 the criminal complaints against the five directors were settled in Geneva.

== See also ==
- List of investors in Bernard L. Madoff Securities
- Madoff investment scandal
