= Thema International Fund =

Irish investment fund

Thema International Fund PLC
- Company type: Dublin-listed, Undertakings for Collective Investment in Transferable Securities (UCITS) III-certified, open-end fund
- Founded: December 1996
- Headquarters: Dublin, Ireland
- Products: feeder fund for Bernard Madoff's securities investment firm (Bernard L. Madoff Investment Securities LLC)
- Total assets: $1.1 billion (purported net asset value; as of 30 November 2008)
- Subsidiaries: Thema Fund

Thema International Fund PLC, based in Dublin, Ireland, is a Dublin-listed, Undertakings for Collective Investment in Transferable Securities (UCITS) III-certified, open-end fund incorporated in Ireland, which was launched in December 1996. It created only one sub-fund, the Thema Fund. The fund had a minimum investment requirement of $50,000.

Thema Fund acted as a feeder fund for Bernard Madoff, seeking funds from investors and channeling them to Madoff Securities. As of November 2008, the then-purported net asset value invested in the fund was $1.1 billion. The fund stopped providing redemptions in December 2008, shortly after the Madoff investment scandal broke, and it was discovered that Madoff was running a Ponzi scheme.

== Investment manager, investment adviser, and custodian ==
Bank Medici AG, an Austrian bank, was Thema Fund's investment manager. In return for finding investors, Bank Medici collected fees of 4.6 million euros from Thema International Fund in 2007. Bank Medici is 75% owned by its founder, Austrian banker Sonja Kohn, and 25% owned by Italian banking company Unicredit SpA.

Thema Fund was distributed to investors by Genevalor, Benbassat & Cie., an investment adviser based in Geneva, Switzerland. Universal Investment (based in Frankfurt, Germany), Themis MN Fund Plc (based in Geneva), Carat Lux Sicav Global One, and BG Umbrella Fund were among the fund's investors. HSBC Holdings Plc acted as custodian for the fund.

== Returns ==
The fund reported a rate of return of 8% for the 11 months ended 28 November 2007. During the same period, competing funds fell by an average of 39%.

== Madoff scandal ==
Thema Fund acted as a feeder fund for Bernard Madoff's securities investment firm (Bernard L. Madoff Investment Securities LLC), seeking funds from investors and channeling the funds to Madoff Securities. As of 30 November 2008, the fund's actual transfers to Madoff Securities minus the fund's withdrawals were approximately $312 million, but the then-purported net asset value invested in the fund at the time was $1.1 billion.

The fund stopped providing redemptions on 14 December 2008, shortly after the Madoff investment scandal broke, when it was discovered that Madoff was running a Ponzi scheme, Madoff was arrested, and a U.S. court froze the assets of Madoff Securities. Madoff was later sentenced to prison for 150 years. It was alleged that Kohn assisted Madoff in criminal activities in effecting the Ponzi scheme.

Although Thema International Fund was regulated by the European Union as a registered UCITS vehicle, and specifically by the Central Bank of Ireland, the regulators were not effective at uncovering Madoff's scheme. Reuters wrote after the scandal broke:

That was the Madoff universe, where regulators vanished and investors didn't care.

=== Litigation ===
By December 2009, the fund had been involved in 50 civil lawsuits in Ireland relating to the Madoff scandal. Individual Thema investors sued Thema International Fund and 27 other defendants, including custodian bank HSBC, in the U.S. District Court for the Southern District of New York in 2009, but in January 2012 the US court held that Ireland was a more appropriate forum to hear the case against HSBC, and dismissed the U.S. case.

In 2013, Thema was suing HSBC in Ireland for US$1.5 billion. The parties began what was slated to be a 14-week trial in the High Court in Dublin on 30 April 2013. The case focused on the bank's role and potential liability as "custodian" to the investment fund that deposited money with Madoff. On 29 May 2013 the parties agreed to a settlement of $250 million, or 1/6th of what plaintiff had sought. It was approved by Thema shareholders, and a settlement payment was made from HSBC to Thema. However, no sooner had the bank transfer happened than the Madoff Trustee sought, and won, an injunction preventing Thema from distributing the HSBC settlement proceeds to its shareholders on the basis that the trustee considered some of Thema's shareholders to be Madoff 'bad actors.'

In September 2017 Thema International Fund agreed to pay $687 million to resolve a trustee lawsuit brought on behalf of the fraud victims that followed from Madoff's frauds.

== See also ==
- List of investors in Bernard L. Madoff Securities
