= Fairfield Greenwich Group =

American investment firm

Fairfield Greenwich
- Company type: Private company
- Industry: Investment management
- Founded: 1983
- Founder: Walter M. Noel Jr. Jeffrey Tucker; Andres Piedrahita
- Headquarters: New York City
- Products: Hedge funds
- AUM: $16 billion (as of 2008)
- Number of employees: 140

Fairfield Greenwich Group is an investment firm founded in 1983 in New York City. The firm had among the largest exposures to the Bernard Madoff fraud.

== History of the firm ==
The firm was founded in 1983 by Walter M. Noel Jr. At one time, the firm operated from Noel's adopted hometown in Greenwich, Connecticut, before relocating its headquarters to New York City, New York.

In 1989, Noel merged his business with a small brokerage firm whose general partner was Jeffrey Tucker, who had worked as a lawyer in the enforcement division of the Securities and Exchange Commission. Both Noel and Tucker are semi-retired.

Fairfield offered feeder funds of single-strategy trading managers. Fairfield also started several fund of funds, each investing in a basket of hedge funds, though the offering of feeder funds has been the primary business of Fairfield. It described its investigation of investment options as "deeper and broader" than competitive firms, because of Tucker's regulatory experience.

Fairfield Greenwich's website says it "employs a significantly higher level of due diligence work than typically performed by most fund of funds and consulting firms". It is an employee-owned firm with 140 employees, 21 of whom are shareholders. At one time, it reported $16 billion in assets under management.

It was reported that foreign investors provided 95% of its managed assets, 68% from Europe, 6% from Asia, and 4% from the Middle East. Each of Noel's four daughters married into international families.

In 2008, Fairfield Greenwich reported more than $14 billion in assets under management.

=== Founding partners ===
==== Walter M. Noel, Jr. and family ====
Presently, Walter Noel has a 17% ownership interest.

Walter Miller Noel, Jr. was born in Birmingham, Alabama in 1930 to Walter and Corinne (née Travis) Noel. At the time of Noel's birth, his father was a mortgage appraiser. The family moved to Kenmore, New York, a suburb of Buffalo, where Noel was raised. Noel attended Montgomery Bell Academy, Vanderbilt University and Harvard Law School. Noel had previously been a private banker in Lausanne, Switzerland, then worked at Citigroup, before becoming the head of Chemical Bank's international private banking practice in Nigeria, Switzerland, and Brazil.

Noel met his Brazilian-born wife, Monica Haegler, who hails from a prominent Swiss family, while she was studying at Wellesley College in Massachusetts. They have five daughters and 19 grandchildren. Their daughters married into families that provided additional connections for the firm and helped funnel money into Madoff's fund:

- His eldest daughter, Corina, married Colombian Andrés Piedrahita in 1989; she lives in Madrid, London and Manhattan.
- Lisina, who lives in Milan, married Yanko Della Schiava, the son of the editor of Cosmopolitan in Italy and of the editor of Harper's Bazaar in Italy and France.
- Ariane married Florence-born Marco Sodi, head of VSS's London-based affiliate, Veronis Suhler Stevenson International, and a partner and managing member of Veronis Suhler Stevenson Funds. They live in Notting Hill, London.
- Alix married Philip Jamchid Toub, the son of a director of the Saronic Shipping Company in Lausanne, Switzerland. He is also a former FGG partner, and the couple lives in Greenwich.
- The youngest daughter, Marisa, married Matthew Brown, an asset manager and the son of a former mayor of San Marino, California. Marisa listed her New York townhouse after the Madoff revelations; she is now a jewelry designer and founder of TRE, an accessories business.

Three of Noel's sons-in-law eventually became partners, promoting the firm's funds in their home countries and other regions, and funneled money into Bernie Madoff's funds. Piedrahita was named a Fairfield founding partner in 2007; he owns 22 percent and became one of the firm's dominant representatives of European and Latin American banking and investment. Della Schiava helmed Noel funds in Madrid and Lugano, Switzerland. Toub was the "agent" for the Abu Dhabi Investment Authority, the Safra National Bank of New York, and the National Bank of Kuwait. Monica Noel's niece, Bianca Haegler, a well-known Brazilian socialite, and her father, Alex, reportedly steered Brazilian investors to the firm, as did her cousin Jorge Paulo Lemann, Brazil's richest financier, co-owner of InBev, Budweiser's parent company.

==== Jeffrey Tucker ====
Jeffrey Tucker also had a 17% interest in the firm. Though he is not as prominent as the Noels, Tucker benefited from Fairfield's success. In 2007, Tucker, chairman of Empire Racing, led the group of thoroughbred investors, who sought to bid for New York State's horse-racing franchise.

=== Joint venture ===
In 2004, the firm formed a partnership with Lion Capital of Singapore, now Lion Global Investors, and created Lion Fairfield Capital Management, a joint venture meant to introduce Asian investors to the firm. Richard Landsberger, a Fairfield partner, is director.

=== Merger ===
In September 2008, Banque Bénédict Hentsch, a private Swiss bank, managing $2 billion in assets, merged with Fairfield Greenwich Group, intending to create an $18 billion venture in combined assets. Bénédict Hentsch, founder and chairman of the board of directors, stated that clients would gain access to Fairfield Greenwich's funds, while Fairfield Greenwich clients would be able to access BBH's wealth management services. Bénédict Hentsch and Robert Pennone became directors of Fairfield Greenwich Group, and Charles Murphy and Mark McKeefry joined the board of Banque Bénédict Hentsch Fairfield Partners SA.

In mid-December 2008, it terminated the merger due to the Madoff crisis. It had $47.5 million of client assets at risk with Madoff.

The founding shareholders of the bank have terminated their partnership with the Fairfield Greenwich Group. They have concluded an agreement with the latter whereby they have repurchased the total capital of the bank ... Banque Bénédict Hentsch have immediately taken all appropriate steps in order to protect the interests of its clients and those of the bank.

== Relationship with Bernard Madoff ==
Noel and Tucker were introduced to Madoff in 1989 by Tucker's father-in-law, from Scarsdale, New York, who knew Madoff and had invested with him.

In 2006, the Securities and Exchange Commission, as part of an investigation into Madoff's activities, determined that Fairfield Greenwich had not properly disclosed that Madoff oversaw its investment decisions, though no evidence of fraud was found. Subsequently, Fairfield Greenwich formally disclosed Madoff's role – and in the process raised about $1.7 billion from investors in the US and Europe.

During the summer of 2007, several private equity firms were discussing taking a large investment in the firm, but Madoff ended any potential deal by refusing to grant the potential investors access for due diligence.

By 2008, the firm had 48 percent of its capital tied to Madoff.

=== Fairfield Sentry Fund ===
Noel and Tucker created the Fairfield Sentry fund in 1990 with $1 million in "seed money", and began expanding it a year later. At the time, Noel and Tucker said Madoff provided more information and transparency than most hedge funds, and operated a reputable Wall Street firm.

The Fairfield Sentry fund required a $100,000 minimum investment, and was billed as a way to tap Madoff's trading expertise using "algorithmic technology" while Fairfield with due diligence conducted "systematic investment compliance". It had more than $7 billion invested with Madoff, and became one of his largest victims. It was Fairfield's signature fund, one of several feeder funds through which money from wealthy foreign investors could capitalize on Madoff's supposed investment acumen. Its marketing prospectus promised low volatility and steady returns, and boasted an 11 percent annual return over the prior 15 years, with only 13 losing months, a record that grew increasingly desirable over recent years of volatility. The fund was backed by loans from banks including Banco Bilbao Vizcaya Argentaria and Nomura Holdings, which invested about $304 million.

The Mugrabis, extremely wealthy art collectors from Colombia who have lived in New York for more than 20 years, and long-time friends of Piedrahita (a Colombian who had married Noel's eldest daughter, Corina), were investors.

"We had very little money with the fund — just under a million dollars — so I am not that upset personally," said Alberto Mugrabi, a son of the family patriarch. "It was a very informal thing. We know Andrés (Piedrahita) since forever, from Bogotá, he's a great guy, and he says to us, 'This is the Madoff thing, he's the master.' I trusted Andrés. I still trust him."

In early 2005, The Abu Dhabi Investment Authority invested approximately $400 million. After redemptions in 2005 and 2006, it continued to invest $132 million, 2% of the fund's assets. One of the largest of the world's sovereign wealth funds, its assets were estimated in early 2008 to be approaching $700 billion.

In August 2008, JPMorgan Chase pulled $250 million from this Madoff feeder fund account. Chase had become "concerned about lack of transparency", and had performed due diligence which had "raised doubts" about Madoff's operation.

The firm set up feeder programs with such banks as Banco Santander, SA private banking unit, Banif, Swedish Bank Nordea, Zurich-based NPB Neue Privat Bank, Banque Bénédict Hentsch & Cie of Geneva, all conduits of fresh money to Madoff which extended his global reach.

=== Fees ===
Fairfield's fee arrangement earned them approximately $400 million from 2005 to 2008. The firm charged clients larger fees than most similar firms did, including a 20% share of profits on investments, about double what competitors charged that farmed out clients' money to a variety of fund managers. In October 2004, it also began collecting a 1% fee on assets under management. Madoff didn't charge additional fees, rather a commission on trades he allegedly executed. This arrangement raised suspicions and doubt among other money managers. Harry Markopolos, the main whistleblower in the Madoff scandal, for instance, wondered why Madoff would leave money "on the table", which was usually unheard of on Wall Street. Hedge fund manager Suzanne Murphy believed that Noel and other Fairfield executives should have wondered why Madoff wasn't charging them anything when "all they were doing was collecting the money."

Massachusetts regulators alleged that in 2007 Tucker earned more than $30 million in fees from Madoff.

=== Red flags ===
There were numerous other red flags, but Fairfield Greenwich chose to ignore them. Even in down markets, Madoff helped Fairfield earn steady returns. In his third submission to the SEC about Madoff, Markopolos noted that in 14 years, Madoff only reported four losing months. Markopolos claimed this was equivalent to a baseball player with a .960 batting average, or an NFL team going 96–4 over a 100-game span. For years, Fairfield's return stream rose steadily upward with only a few downticks, represented graphically by a near-perfect 45-degree angle. Markopolos contended that such a distribution "simply doesn't exist in finance", since the markets are too volatile under the best of conditions for this to be possible.

Madoff frequently "over-hedged" his trades for Fairfield Sentry by buying more options than necessary to hedge his stock positions. In many cases, he did so to generate profits, a violation of his contract with Fairfield Greenwich. In May 2008, for instance, over $95 million of Sentry's earnings were the product of over-hedging. In June 2008, a financial consultant noticed that even with the market as a whole trending downward, Madoff was on the winning side of every trade. He didn't think this was possible even for a trader of Madoff's ability, and suggested that Fairfield Greenwich officials find out who was trading with Madoff and make sure he was actually holding the assets he claimed to hold. However, no one did so.

As early as 2005, Fairfield Greenwich was aware that Madoff was being audited by an accounting firm with only one full-time accountant.

=== New funds in 2008 ===
As recently as December 11, 2008, the day Madoff was taken into federal custody, Madoff was working with Fairfield Greenwich to raise money for new funds, which promised about a 16% return, using more leverage than the 3–1 ratios he claimed he used in existing funds. It was reported by one client that Fairfield warned investors they would be excluded from any future Madoff product if they declined to participate in the new fund and/or withdrew from any existing funds.

== Aftermath of Madoff's confession ==
=== Lawsuits ===
==== Investor lawsuits ====
Fairfield Greenwich was a defendant in a class action seeking to recoup losses resulting from Fairfield Greenwich funds' investments with Bernard L. Madoff Investment Securities. The class action was a result of the consolidation of multiple cases filed in federal and state court against Fairfield Greenwich. On September 29, 2009, a second amended consolidated complaint was filed. The complaint also named as defendants the placement agent for the funds; Citco, the fund administrator and sub-custodian of the funds which calculated the net asset value (NAV) of the funds; and PricewaterhouseCoopers, the auditor of the funds. The complaint alleged fraud, violations of Rule 10b-5, violations of Section 20(a), negligent misrepresentation, gross negligence, breach of fiduciary duty, third-party beneficiary breach of contract, constructive trust, mutual mistake, negligence, negligent misrepresentation, aiding and abetting breach of fiduciary duty, aiding and abetting fraud, and unjust enrichment.

In the case of Anwar v. Fairfield Greenwich (SDNY) relating to fund administrator liability for failure to handle its NAV-related obligations properly, the defendants settled in 2016 by paying the Anwar plaintiffs $235 million. The court held in the case, prior to the settlement, that

it is reasonable to infer from Plaintiffs' allegations that the Administrators were aware that Plaintiffs would—and did—rely on their statements of the Funds' NAVs that were sent to the investors. ... Accordingly, the Court finds that Plaintiffs allege a relationship between the investors and the Administrators that gives rise to a duty of care

Fairfield was also a defendant in a lawsuit filed in Miami against PricewaterhouseCoopers Ireland by investors in a fund marketed by defendant Banco Santander SA, Europe's second-largest bank by market value, which lost an estimated $3 billion.

==== Massachusetts action ====
On April 1, 2009, Massachusetts Secretary of the Commonwealth William Galvin filed a civil action charging Fairfield Greenwich with fraud, breaching its fiduciary duty to clients by failing to provide promised due diligence on its investments. The complaint sought a fine and restitution to Massachusetts investors for losses and disgorgement of performance fees paid to Fairfield by those investors. It alleged that in 2005 Madoff coached Fairfield staff about ways to answer questions from SEC attorneys who were looking into Harry Markopolos' complaint about Madoff's operations. The Secretary of State had stated that he had no plans to settle the lawsuit in spite of Fairfield Greenwich's offer to repay all Massachusetts investors, and said he was going to force Fairfield to explain e-mails and other evidence that appear to show company officials knew about potential problems with Madoff but failed to disclose them to clients. However, the action was settled on September 8, 2009. Fairfield Greenwich neither admitted nor denied wrongdoing, accepted a censure from state officials, agreed to provide restitution to Massachusetts investors, and paid a $500,000 fine.

==== Other lawsuits and investigations ====
On April 13, 2009, a Connecticut judge dissolved a temporary asset freeze from March 30, 2009, and issued an order for Walter Noel to post property pledges of $10 million against his Greenwich home and $2 million against Jeffrey Tucker's. Noel agreed to the attachment on his house "with no findings, including no finding of liability or wrongdoing". Andres Piedrahita's assets continued to remain temporarily frozen because he was never served with the complaint. The principals were all involved in a lawsuit filed by the town of Fairfield's pension funds. The pension fund case was Retirement Program for Employees of the Town of Fairfield v. Madoff, FBT-CV-09-5023735-S, Superior Court of Connecticut (Bridgeport).

On May 18, 2009, Irving Picard sued Fairfield Greenwich Group seeking the return of $3.2 billion covering the period from 2002 to Madoff's arrest in December 2008. $1.2 billion was withdrawn in the final three months of the fraud. Since 1995, the Fairfield funds invested about $4.5 billion with Bernard L. Madoff Investment Securities LLC, or BLMIS, through 242 wire transfers. The funds were Fairfield Sentry Ltd., Greenwich Sentry LP, and Greenwich Sentry Partners LP. However, it was conjectured that the money may already be in the hands of Fairfield's own clients, who are likely off-limits to Picard, since they weren't direct investors with Madoff.

On May 29, 2009, Fairfield Sentry, based in the British Virgin Islands, filed a complaint in New York State Supreme Court in Manhattan seeking to recover more than $919 million in investment management and performance fees that it paid to Fairfield, based upon "inflated net asset value reports of its investments with Bernard L. Madoff Investment Securities LLC ... The Fairfield entity defendants recklessly disregarded their duties as the fund's risk and investment adviser and their actions and inactions constitute gross negligence." The lawsuit alleged breach of fiduciary duty, and unjust enrichment. It was "the largest victim of the fraud perpetrated by Bernard L. Madoff", losing $7 billion.

The defendants include founders Noel and Tucker and other fund partners who the plaintiffs alleged "failed to fulfill their contractual obligations to use best efforts to supervise the operations" of Madoff-related investments and to "oversee the day-to-day investment activities of the fund". The case was Fairfield Sentry Ltd. v. Fairfield Greenwich Group, 601687/2009, New York State Supreme Court (Manhattan).

On July 20, 2009, Justice Edward Alexander Bannister granted the request to liquidate the Fairfield Sentry funds, worth more than $7.2 billion in December 2008, now less than $70 million, incorporated in 1990 under the mutual fund statutes of the British Virgin Islands and technically under the control of their local directors.

Spanish anticorruption prosecutors investigated Fairfield Greenwich as well as Piedrahita to determine what they knew about Madoff's fraudulent funds when they sold them to Spanish clients. According to Fairfield's offices in Spain, Spanish investments totaled $89.1 million.

On November 19, 2010, both Greenwich Sentry, L.P. and Greenwich Sentry Partners, L.P. voluntarily filed for Chapter 11 bankruptcy protection in New York. Court filings blamed the bankruptcy filings on the cost of the Madoff-related litigation, and asserted a goal of reaching a global settlement of the litigation for the bankruptcy cases.

=== Allegation of auditor shopping ===
On February 4, 2009, Madoff whistleblower Harry Markopolos testified before Congress. In his prepared statement he discussed Fairfield Greenwich's accounting practices regarding its choice of auditors and accused it of frequently switching them, or "auditor shopping". However, Markopolos did not distinguish between separate auditors for separate funds within Fairfield Greenwich, which did not actually change as he alleged.

=== Effects on executives and other employees ===
Noel and Tucker sold a one-16th shared interest in a Cessna 560XL private jet, purchased in late 2006. Tucker wanted to sell his three horse farms, which he bought in 2004 for $18 million. They each include furnished homes. Most of his horses have been sold.

Tucker's wife Melanie, an avid bridge player, was accustomed to using her husband's jet to fly herself, and the bridge pros hired to play on her team, to bridge tournaments across the country. She postponed attending tournaments requiring air travel.

Executive Charles Murphy initially offered for sale his 1882, 12,000-square-foot (1,100 m^{2}) limestone townhouse, located at 7 East 67th Street, Lenox Hill, Manhattan, but as of December 2009, the home was no longer listed. He had bought the residence from Seagram liquor heir Matthew Bronfman in 2007 for $33 million. Murphy later committed suicide by leaping to his death from the 24th floor of the Sofitel New York Hotel on March 27, 2017. His widow, Annabelle Murphy, later sold the townhouse for only $28.5 million in April 2018, well below its peak $49.5 million asking price in 2016.

Matthew Brown and his wife, Marisa Noel Brown, were forced to sell their Upper East Side townhouse at 12 East 78th Street for $9.75 million, $3.75 million less than what they had paid in January 2008.

== See also ==
- Madoff investment scandal
- Ponzi scheme
- List of investors in Bernard L. Madoff Securities
