= Sonja Kohn =

Austrian banker

- Born: Sonja Türk; 5 August 1948 (age 77)
- Occupation: Banker

Sonja Kohn (née Türk; born 5 August 1948) is an Austrian banker.

== Biography ==
Kohn was born to Jewish refugees from the Holocaust from Eastern Europe. She grew up in Vienna. In the 1970s, with her husband Erwin Kohn, she started an import-export business and moved to Milan, Italy.

In the 1980s, she lived for a time in New York City and worked as a stockbroker for Merrill Lynch.

In 1994, she founded the Bank Medici in Vienna. One year later, she moved to New York State. They lived in Monsey, a large, ultraorthodox Jewish community. The Kohns founded a small brokerage firm, the Eurovaleur Inc. In New York City, she became known as "Austria’s woman on Wall Street." Kohn only got into investing after staying home to raise her five children.

In the 1990s, they moved back to Vienna. Bank Medici was relaunched in 2003 as an Aktiengesellschaft. She is shareholder of 75 percent and is head of the bank's supervising board.

She also was consultant of the Vienna Stock Exchange until 2006, and was member of the supervisory board of Italian Finlombardia bank.

In 2015 Kohn founded BestFit, her second digital venture after FundsWorld, a platform for the distribution of mutual funds with Intesa SanPaolo.

== Madoff connection ==
Kohn met Bernard Madoff in the 1980s while she was working as a broker at Merrill Lynch in New York City. Bank Medici directed funds from investors to Madoff. For example, Bank Medici was Thema Fund's investment manager. In return for finding investors, Bank Medici collected fees of 4.6 million euros from Thema International Fund in 2007.

In 1992, Kohn introduced Madoff to Mario Benbassat, founder of Genevalor Benbassat & Cie, and his two sons in New York, as a possible source of new funds for Madoff. Genevalor set up five European feeder funds, including $1.1bn Irish fund Thema International Fund set up by Thema Asset Management, a British Virgin Islands-based company 55 per cent owned by Genevalor, and invested almost $2 billion with Madoff. Thema International paid fees of 1.25% ($13.75m a year) to Genevalor Benbasset & Cie. The Wall Street Journal reported in December 2008 that the company was said to be a key player distributing Madoff investments in the Madoff investment scandal.

Kohn kept a low profile after the disclosure of the securities fraud conducted by Madoff. She said in an e-mail dated 14 January 2009, to Bloomberg News, that she was not an accomplice with, but as deceived by the "Madoff fraud" as anyone else. Madoff wasn't a friend and didn't confide in her, she wrote. She denied participating in a "fraud that destroyed lives, life savings and companies." Following this, Bank Medici decided on 19 March 2009 to wind down all banking business and to relinquish the banking license. On 10 December 2010, Kohn was sued by Irving H. Picard, trustee of assets seized by the court from Bernard Madoff, for $19.6 billion. Picard claimed that she funneled 'billions' of investor dollars to Madoff in return for $62 million in kickbacks; this was one of dozens of lawsuits filed against Madoff investors and alleged collaborators before the two-year statute of limitations required by US civil code ran out on 11 December 2010.

At the Queen's Bench Division of the High Court of England and Wales in November 2013, judge Andrew Popplewell dismissed all claims against Kohn filed by liquidators of Madoff Securities International Ltd., based in London. The judge criticized the way the case had been pursued, while praising the "dignity" and "restraint" of Kohn. "This unfounded claim ... has been pursued aggressively and relentlessly over several years, on occasion with an unfair degree of hyperbole," he said, adding that Kohn had suffered "poisonous press releases" by the trustee of Madoff's U.S. business, and stating that she was a victim and that her honesty and integrity had been vindicated.

In September 2017, Thema International Fund agreed to pay $687 million to resolve the trustee's lawsuit that followed from the Madoff frauds.
