= ACPI Investments =

Asset management firm with offices in London, Jersey, and South Africa

ACPI Investments is an asset management firm serving private clients, trustees, charities, family offices, and institutions. The company has offices in London, Jersey, and South Africa and manages over $3 billion in global assets. ACPI offers services in portfolio management, private equity, corporate finance advise, and strategic wealth advisory.

== History ==
ACPI was initially established as ACP Partners in 2001 by Alok Oberoi and Joseph Sassoon, both former partners of Goldman Sachs, in order to manage their own assets. At Goldman Sachs, Oberoi was the Head of International Private Wealth Management, and Sassoon was the Head of European Private Wealth Management. Whilst Joseph retired from ACPI, Alok remained as Chairman of the ACPI Group and is actively involved in the running of the business. Brett Lankester joined ACPI Partners from Goldman Sachs in 2007 and is CEO.

Today, ACPI deals in all major asset classes including multi-manager, equities, fixed income, and alternative investments. ACPI focuses on capital preservation and active portfolio management on an absolute return basis. UBP (Union Bancaire Privee) acquired ACPI in January 2019.
