= Reichmuth & Co =

Swiss private bank

Coordinates: 47.0501°N 8.3025°E

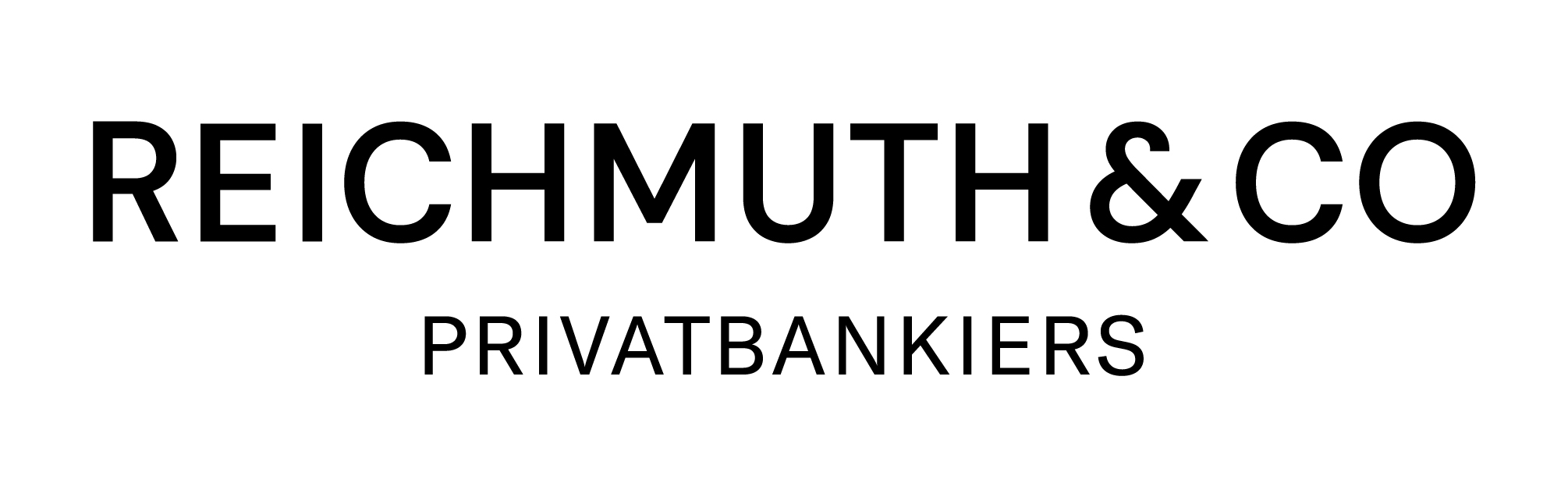
- Company type: private bank
- Industry: Financial industry
- Founded: Luzern, Switzerland, 1988
- Headquarters: Luzern, Switzerland
- Key people: General partners: Karl Reichmuth, Christof Reichmuth, and Juerg Staub
- AUM: CHF 8 billion (Swiss Francs) under management (2013)
- Website: www.reichmuthco.ch

Reichmuth & Co is a Swiss private bank that was founded in Luzern, Switzerland, in 1988. It was the first private bank created in Switzerland in 80 years. Its general partners are Karl Reichmuth (President, since 1996), Christof Reichmuth (CEO and CIO; Karl Reichmuth's son), and Juerg Staub. As of 2012, it was one of 12 unlimited liability bank members listed by the Swiss Private Bankers Association. It is a prominent major player among Swiss hedge funds.

Through its Reichmuth Matterhorn fund, it lost $330 million in four hedge funds invested with Bernie Madoff. In December 2008, the fund totaled approximately $3.9 billion, according to chief executive officer Christof Reichmuth, who said: "It’s unbelievable that no auditor, no administrator, no fund manager noticed this fraud. We will have to wait to find out how that was possible." In spite of these losses, Matterhorn returned around 7 percent a year over 13 years.

In 2010, it managed more than CHF 8 billion (Swiss francs), about 25 percent in foreign assets. That year, the company's Chairman predicted that in two or three years the monetary union built around the Euro would break apart.

In 2011, it was planning to set up new funds to replace the Matterhorn Fund, which was being dissolved.

In 2013, it had CHF 8 billion (Swiss francs) under management.

== See also ==
- List of investors in Bernard L. Madoff Securities
