= Carl J. Shapiro =

American philanthropist and businessman (1913–2021)

- Born: February 15, 1913; Boston, Massachusetts, U.S.
- Died: March 7, 2021 (aged 108); Boston, Massachusetts, U.S.
- Occupations: Businessman, woman's clothing company founder and philanthropist
- Known for: Founding Kay Windsor, Inc
- Spouse: Ruth Shapiro (m. 1939; died 2012)
- Relatives: Robert M. Jaffe (son-in-law)

Carl J. Shapiro (February 15, 1913 – March 7, 2021) was an American businessman and philanthropist. In 1939 he founded Kay Windsor, Inc. in New Bedford, Massachusetts, and built it into one of the largest women's clothing companies in the country. He was its president and chairman of the board and was director of VF Corporation, which acquired Kay Windsor in 1971; he retired five years later.

== Philanthropy ==
In 1961 The Carl and Ruth Shapiro Family Foundation was established. It supports community-based nonprofits focused on improving the lives of the disabled, disadvantaged, and disenfranchised. Its support has bolstered the work of about 65 organizations working in areas such as youth arts, adult education, domestic violence, and assistive technology for persons with disabilities. In December 2008, the Foundation lost about $145 million in Bernard Madoff’s Ponzi scheme.

Shapiro and his wife, Ruth became Brandeis University benefactors in 1950. Ruth joined the University's National Women's Committee in 1948. Carl served as a Brandeis Fellow from 1977–79, and as a Trustee from 1979 to 1988, when he became a Trustee emeritus. They gave $25 million, the largest gift in Brandeis history, to build the 2003 Carl and Ruth Shapiro Campus Center; they funded the admissions center and endowed a chair in international finance held by Peter Petri, dean of the International Business School (formerly the Graduate School of International Economics and Finance). The Shapiros also funded the Carl and Ruth Shapiro Center for Library Technology and Journals in the Farber Library on campus. In January 2003 Shapiro received Brandeis' highest honor, an honorary degree, citing an "unshakable commitment to making the world a better place".

Shapiro founded the Carl J. Shapiro Institute for Education and Research at Harvard Medical School, Boston Medical Center, and Beth Israel Deaconess Medical Center in Boston. In 2005 the Shapiros donated $25 million to Brigham and Women's Hospital, for the world's most advanced cardiovascular care facility, the Carl J. and Ruth Shapiro Cardiovascular Center, designed to support one of the world’s leading teams of cardiovascular experts. In 2008 they also pledged $27 million to Dana-Farber/Brigham and Women’s Cancer Center to substantially upgrade and expand its facilities for cancer care services. Other recipients of The Shapiro's contributions include; Boston Museum of Fine Arts, Wellesley College, Beth Israel Deaconess Medical Center, Boston Symphony Orchestra, Kravis Center for the Performing Arts, the Norton Museum of Art, and the Palm Beach Opera, among other institutions.

== Bernard Madoff ==
Shapiro and his foundation reportedly lost some $550 million from dealings with Bernie Madoff, who received $250 million around December 1, 2008 from Shapiro, then one of Madoff's oldest friends and one of his biggest financial backers. Shapiro's and his son-in-law Robert M. Jaffe's accounts with Madoff were managed by Paul J. Konigsberg, a senior tax partner at Konigsberg Wolf & Company in New York City. Konigsberg has been criminally indicted for working closely with Madoff to phony up investment records for Konigsberg's large clients to achieve targeted gains and tax losses.

Regulators are looking into a brokerage firm, Cohmad Securities (taken from the names "Cohn" and "Madoff"), which is largely owned by Maurice Cohn and his daughter Marcia, President and Chief Compliance Officer, with whom Madoff shared 10–20 percent ownership stakes, and Madoff's firm's address in New York City. Peter Madoff, brother of Bernard, owned less than one share. Cohmad vice president Robert Jaffe's ownership of Cohmad was less than 5 percent.

=== Robert Jaffe ===
Jaffe "worked the Palm Beach, Florida circuit, and attracted many Palm Beach Country Club members as investors". Jaffe claimed he had received a commission of 1% to 2% from an investor's first profit after he guided their money to Madoff. Jaffe paid commissions to financial advisers who steered cash to Madoff's fund.

On January 14, 2009 William Galvin, Secretary of the Commonwealth of Massachusetts, who is in charge of the state's securities issues, filed suit against Jaffe, who promoted Madoff's funds to wealthy investors in Massachusetts and Florida. On February 4, compelled to testify, Jaffe invoked his Fifth Amendment right. On February 11, 2009, Galvin filed a complaint seeking to revoke the Massachusetts license of Cohmad Securities Corp., an accounting of all Massachusetts investors Cohmad referred to Madoff’s company, all the fees it earned doing so (more than $67 million), and a fine.

=== Financial losses ===
On May 20, 2009 the family foundation of Carl Shapiro amended its taxes to reflect more than $140 million in losses in 2005. It reflected a 74 percent drop in income, to $1.2 million. The Foundation hired Caras and Shulman, P.C. for accounting purposes. Their previous accounting firm, Konigsberg, Wolf & Co., was the firm Madoff recommended to many clients.

=== Sanctions ===
Shapiro was among a group of investors who experienced potential losses between $100 million and $1 billion in the Bernard Madoff hedge fund scheme. It has been reported that a criminal investigation has commenced regarding his alleged complicity in the Madoff affair. In 2010, Shapiro and various related people and entities agreed to forfeit $625 million to the United States, all of which will be made available to the victims of the fraudulent investment advisory business which was owned and operated by Bernard L. Madoff. Since at least the late 1960s, Shapiro was an investor in Madoff holding an account in his own name and controlling accounts held by various related individuals and entities. Over the course of his approximately 40-year relationship with Madoff and BLMIS, Shapiro invested hundreds of millions of dollars into his BLMIS accounts, but withdrew hundreds of millions more.

To resolve any and all potential civil claims by the government against the Shapiro family, the family agreed to forfeit $625 million to the government—an amount in excess of Shapiro and his wife’s net worth at the time, as well as in excess of the fictitious profits that Shapiro and his wife took out of BLMIS. The settlement contains no finding or admission of fault against Shapiro or his family; the settlement does not, however, release any party from criminal liability.

== Personal life ==
Shapiro was married for 73 years to Ruth Gordon, who was also Jewish, until her death in 2012; they had three daughters: Rhonda Shapiro Zinner, Ellen Shapiro Jaffe, and Linda Shapiro Waintrup. Since 2009 Shapiro divided his time between Boston and Palm Beach.

Shapiro turned 100 in February 2013. His daughter Ellen is married to Robert M. Jaffe, a money manager from Boston and Palm Beach, Florida. Another daughter, Rhonda Zinner (deceased), was on the Brandeis Board of Trustees and a key organizer and planner in the family's philanthropic causes and projects, including the University's new campus center. As of June 2017, Shapiro, then 104, was noted as being the only one of Bernard Madoff's "big four" clients still alive. Shapiro died on March 7, 2021, at his home in Boston. He was 108.

== See also ==
- List of investors in Bernard L. Madoff Securities
