= Robert Jaffe (stockbroker) =

American stockbroker (born 1944)

Robert M. Jaffe
- Born: 1944 (age 81–82)
- Occupation: stockbroker
- Known for: associate of Bernard Madoff
- Spouse: Ellen Shapiro
- Relatives: Carl J. Shapiro (father-in-law)

Robert M. Jaffe (born 1944) is an American stockbroker. He was a long-time associate of Ponzi schemer Bernard Madoff and promoted Madoff's fund to wealthy investors in Massachusetts and Florida.

He is vice president of Cohmad Securities Corporation.

== Biography ==
Jaffe is married to Ellen Shapiro, daughter of Boston philanthropist Carl J. Shapiro, the founder and former chairman of apparel company Kay Windsor Inc. and an early investor and close friend of Madoff. Jaffe reportedly convinced the elder Shapiro to invest $250 million with Madoff just ten days before Madoff's arrest.

== Cohmad Securities Corporation ==
Maurice "Sonny" Cohn owned 48% of Cohmad, and his daughter Marcia, who served as president and chief compliance officer, owned 25%. Madoff owned 15%. Mr. Madoff's brother Peter owned 9%, and Mr. Cohn's brother owned 1%, and another unnamed Cohmad employee owned 1%. The brokerage firm lists its address as Madoff's firm's address in New York City. Cohmad received $67 million in generated fees from Madoff investments, from 2000 to 2008.

=== Bernard Madoff agent ===
A bon vivant and philanthropist, Jaffe "worked the Palm Beach, Florida circuit", and attracted many Palm Beach Country Club members as investors." Jaffe brought in 150 accounts and more than $1 billion to Madoff. Madoff paid Jaffe directly through accounts he kept with Madoff at much higher returns than earned by other investors. Between 1996 and 2008, Jaffe withdrew at least $150 million, and the U.S. Securities and Exchange Commission (SEC) claims he was aware Madoff was engaged in fictitious trading. Jaffe has said he received a commission of 1% to 2% from an investor's first profit, and he paid commissions to financial advisers who steered cash to Madoff's fund.

== Civil lawsuits ==
On January 14, 2009, William Galvin, Secretary of State of Massachusetts, in charge of securities issues for Massachusetts, filed suit against Jaffe.

On February 4, compelled to testify, Jaffe invoked his Fifth Amendment right. He responded that he was also one of Madoff's victims.

On May 8, 2009, the Commonwealth of Massachusetts found the firm to be in "default" for not assisting regulators. Cohmad's securities registration has been revoked, and they must provide an accounting of all fees the company or its agents earned for referring Massachusetts investors to Mr. Madoff's firm as well as, pay a $100,000 fine for failing to cooperate with the state securities investigation.

On June 22, 2009, Madoff Trustee Irving Picard filed a claim against Cohmad. Jaffe was named as a defendant among more than two dozen individuals and trusts in U.S. Bankruptcy Court in New York. The lawsuit claims that up to 90 percent of Cohmad's income came from referring clients and that the firm had a "symbiotic" relationship with Madoff, having earned hundreds of millions of dollars from the fraud. The lawsuit seeks more than $100 million paid to Cohmad six years prior to Madoff’s firm declaring bankruptcy, and more than $105 million in profits Cohmad employees and their families withdrew from the investment accounts they held with Madoff. The case is Picard v. Cohmad Securities Corp., 09-AP-1305, U.S. Bankruptcy Court, Southern District of New York (Manhattan).

On June 22, 2009, the SEC also filed civil fraud charges against Cohmad, and Jaffe was also named as a defendant. The lawsuit alleges the company was Madoff's "in-house marketing arm" and critical to Madoff's scam. Cohmad representatives were paid for funds they brought into the firm but not for any increase in the investments' value. Withdrawals were treated as a loss, which "suggested that profits generated by Madoff were fictitious", but Madoff changed the arrangement in 2002 and began paying Cohmad representatives $2 million a year. The case was SEC v. Cohmad Securities Corp., 09 Civ. 5680. In February 2010, the SEC lawsuit was dismissed, with the judge noting, "There is nothing inherently fraudulent about referring customers to an investment adviser for fees." In November 2010, the SEC filed an amended complaint, charging Jaffe and Cohmad with "material misrepresentations and omissions."

A $550 million settlement was announced on December 7, 2010, between Picard and SIPC and the Shapiro family; it was stated that $38 million of that represented "the full amount that the Trustee demanded from Robert Jaffe in connection with his role with Cohmad Securities".
