= Madoff (surname) =

Madoff is a surname. Notable people with the surname include:

- Bernie Madoff (1938–2021), American criminal whose US$65 billion Ponzi scheme employed many family members, including:
  - Ruth Madoff (born 1941), American bookkeeper and wife of Bernie Madoff
  - Mark Madoff (1964–2010), American financier and son of Bernie Madoff
  - Andrew Madoff (1966–2014), American financier and son of Bernie Madoff
  - Shana Madoff (born 1967), American attorney and niece of Bernie Madoff
- Michelle Madoff (1928–2013), American politician; Pittsburgh councilwoman from 1978 to 1993
- Ray Madoff, American legal scholar.

== See also ==
- Madoff (miniseries), a 2016 television miniseries about Bernie Madoff
