= The Wizard of Lies =

2017 Bernie Madoff biopic by Barry Levinson

- Television release poster
- Based on: The Wizard of Lies: Bernie Madoff and the Death of Trust by Diana B. Henriques
- Written by: Sam Levinson; Sam Baum; John Burnham Schwartz
- Directed by: Barry Levinson
- Starring: Robert De Niro; Michelle Pfeiffer; Alessandro Nivola; Hank Azaria; Nathan Darrow; Kristen Connolly; Kathrine Narducci; Diana B. Henriques
- Music by: Evgueni Galperine; Sacha Galperine
- Country of origin: United States
- Original language: English

Production
- Producer: Joseph E. Iberti
- Cinematography: Eigil Bryld
- Editor: Ron Patane
- Running time: 132 minutes
- Production company: HBO Films

Original release
- Network: HBO
- Release: May 20, 2017

The Wizard of Lies is a 2017 American television biopic film directed by Barry Levinson and written by Sam Levinson, Sam Baum, and John Burnham Schwartz, based on the 2011 non-fiction book of the same name by Diana B. Henriques. The film stars Robert De Niro as businessman and fraudster Bernie Madoff, Michelle Pfeiffer as his wife Ruth Madoff, and Alessandro Nivola as their older son Mark Madoff. It aired on HBO on May 20, 2017. This is the fourth film featuring De Niro and Pfeiffer, following Stardust (2007), New Year's Eve (2011) and The Family (2013), as well as their first collaboration for television.

== Plot ==
Bernard Madoff founded his company on Wall Street in the early 1960s, which, over time, turned into one of the largest investment funds. Madoff had enjoyed a reputation as a successful and influential financier, broker, financial consultant, and generous philanthropist. He employs his sons, Mark and Andrew, and his wife, Ruth. In 2008, it became known that, over the past 16 years, his firm had run the largest Ponzi scheme in history. The resulting scandal lead to multibillion-dollar losses and the arrest of Madoff, who was later sentenced to 150 years in prison.

Lawyer Martin London, Mark Madoff's father-in-law, advises Bernie Madoff's sons to turn their father in to the authorities.

Bernie Madoff admits to FBI agents that he had been operating a Ponzi scheme since the 1970s. In 2009, Harry Markopolos testified before the US House that he believed the Madoff's company was a fraudulent Ponzi scheme because the company's gains never fluctuated up and down.

In 2005, Madoff does not want to give investigators his Depository Trust Company (DTC) account number but complies with their request in an unsuspecting manner. Madoff explains that all the SEC had to do was to make a call to DTC to verify the supposed assets of his advisory business and they would have realised right there and then that there were in fact no assets held in the firm's DTC account and the entire operation was a fraud. No phone call from the SEC to DTC was made.

By the start of the 2008 Great Recession in the United States, numerous clients start pouring into Madoff's firm to withdraw their money. Madoff does not have the money to return, however, and realizes that his fraud will inevitably be exposed. He tells his wife and sons about the Ponzi scheme, and his sons are left with no choice but to turn him in. Madoff and his wife attempt suicide by taking Ambien, but fail to take a lethal dose.

Clawback suits are filed against Madoff's sons. Mark Madoff commits suicide, while Andrew dies of cancer. Before the latter's death, he says, "My father is dead to me." Ruth tells Madoff that she will no longer visit him and will no longer take his calls from prison. She wants a relationship with her son and blames him for Mark's death. While talking with journalist Diana B. Henriques in prison, Madoff refuses to take responsibility for ruining his victims' lives, even blaming them for "letting" him take advantage of them. He then asks, "Do you think I'm a sociopath?"

== Cast ==
- Robert De Niro as Bernard Madoff
- Michelle Pfeiffer as Ruth Madoff
- Alessandro Nivola as Mark Madoff
- Hank Azaria as Frank DiPascali
- Lily Rabe as Catherine Hooper
- Kristen Connolly as Stephanie Madoff
- Kathrine Narducci as Eleanor Squillari
- Michael Kostroff as Peter Madoff
- Nathan Darrow as Andrew Madoff
- Diana B. Henriques as Herself
- Steve Coulter as Martin London
- David Lipman as Martin Flumenbaum
- Kelly AuCoin as Agent Cacioppi
- Don Castro as Agent Kang
- Amanda Warren as SEC Investigator
- Sydney Gayle as Emily Madoff
- Shivam Chopra as Male Student
- Clem Cheung as Denny Chin
- Ben Hammer as Carl J. Shapiro
- Matt Fischel as Jeffry Picower

== Production ==
On August 27, 2015 Michelle Pfeiffer and Alessandro Nivola joined the film to play wife Ruth Madoff and older son Mark Madoff, respectively. On September 9, 2015 Hank Azaria joined the film as Frank DiPascali. On September 10, 2015 Nathan Darrow, Kristen Connolly, Kathrine Narducci, and Steve Coulter were cast as Andrew Madoff, Stephanie Madoff, Eleanor Squillari, and Martin London, respectively. Diana B. Henriques was also cast as herself. On 11 September 2015, Lily Rabe was cast as Catherine Hooper.

Principal photography on the film began on August 31, 2015, in New York City.

John Burnham Schwartz, Sam Baum and Sam Levinson were credited as the film's writers. Diana Henriques’s The Wizard of Lies: Bernie Madoff and The Death of Trust, and Laurie Sandell’s Truth and Consequences: Life Inside the Madoff Family were credited as additional source material.

== Reception ==
=== Critical response ===
On Rotten Tomatoes, the film has a rating of 73%, based on 52 reviews, with a weighted average rating of 6.5/10. The site's critical consensus reads, "The Wizard of Lies doesn't really shed much new light on its fact-based story, but thanks to solid direction and a talented cast, it still proves consistently watchable." On Metacritic, the film has a score of 67 out of 100, based on 26 critics, indicating "favorable reviews". Writing for RogerEbert.com, Brian Tallerico gave the film 3 stars out of 4, praising De Niro's performance as "subtle" and "fascinating".

=== Ratings ===
The film's premiere drew 1.5 million viewers, making it HBO's largest premiere viewership for an HBO film in four years; additional replays and viewings through the network's streaming service brought the film's total viewers to 2.4 million for its premiere weekend.

=== Awards and nominations ===
Year	Award	Category	Nominee(s)	Result	Ref.
2017	Primetime Emmy Awards	Outstanding Television Movie	Jane Rosenthal, Robert De Niro, Berry Welsh, Barry Levinson, Tom Fontana, Jason Sosnoff, and Joseph E. Iberti	Nominated	
2017	Primetime Emmy Awards	Outstanding Lead Actor in a Limited Series or Movie	Robert De Niro	Nominated	
2017	Primetime Emmy Awards	Outstanding Supporting Actress in a Limited Series or Movie	Michelle Pfeiffer	Nominated	
2017	Primetime Creative Arts Emmy Awards	Outstanding Casting for a Limited Series, Movie, or Special	Ellen Chenoweth	Nominated	
2017	Television Critics Association Awards	Outstanding Achievement in Movies, Miniseries and Specials		Nominated	
2018	American Cinema Editors Awards	Best Edited Miniseries or Motion Picture for Television	Ron Patane	Nominated	
2018	Artios Awards	Outstanding Achievement in Casting – Film – Non-Theatrical Release	Ellen Chenoweth and Susanne Scheel	Won	
2018	Critics' Choice Television Awards	Best Movie Made for Television		Won	
2018	Critics' Choice Television Awards	Best Actor in a Movie Made for Television or Limited Series	Robert De Niro	Nominated	
2018	Critics' Choice Television Awards	Best Supporting Actress in a Movie Made for Television or Limited Series	Michelle Pfeiffer	Nominated	
2018	Directors Guild of America Awards	Outstanding Directorial Achievement in Movies for Television and Miniseries	Barry Levinson	Nominated	
2018	Golden Globe Awards	Best Actor – Miniseries or Television Film	Robert De Niro	Nominated	
2018	Golden Globe Awards	Best Supporting Actress – Series, Miniseries or Television Film	Michelle Pfeiffer	Nominated	
2018	Producers Guild of America Awards	David L. Wolper Award for Outstanding Producer of Long-Form Television	Jane Rosenthal, Robert De Niro, Berry Welsh, Barry Levinson, Tom Fontana, Jason Sosnoff, and Joseph E. Iberti	Nominated	
2018	Satellite Awards	Best Motion Picture Made for Television		Won	
2018	Satellite Awards	Best Actor in a Miniseries or a Motion Picture Made for Television	Robert De Niro	Won	
2018	Satellite Awards	Best Actress in a Miniseries or a Motion Picture Made for Television	Michelle Pfeiffer	Nominated	
2018	Screen Actors Guild Awards	Outstanding Performance by a Male Actor in a Miniseries or Television Movie	Robert De Niro	Nominated	
2018	Writers Guild of America Awards	Long Form – Adapted	Sam Levinson, John Burnham Schwartz, and Samuel Baum; Based on the books: The Wizard of Lies by Diana B. Henriques; Truth and Consequences by Laurie Sandell	Nominated	

== Soundtrack ==
The Wizard of Lies (Music from the HBO Film)

Soundtrack album by Evgueni Galperine and Sacha Galperine
- Released: May 19, 2017
- Length: 38:18
- Label: Lakeshore Records

The Wizard of Lies (Music from the HBO Film) was released digitally May 19, 2017, the day before the film's premiere.

No.	Title	Writer(s)	Length
1.	"The Wizard of Lies"	Evgueni Galperine and Sacha Galperine	1:56
2.	"A New Start"	Evgueni Galperine and Sacha Galperine	0:58
3.	"Ponzi Scheme"	Evgueni Galperine and Sacha Galperine	1:55
4.	"It's Not Enough"	Evgueni Galperine and Sacha Galperine	2:06
5.	"Nightmare"	Evgueni Galperine and Sacha Galperine	1:50
6.	"FBI"	Evgueni Galperine and Sacha Galperine	2:29
7.	"150 Years"	Evgueni Galperine and Sacha Galperine	3:14
8.	"The Club Colette Jam / Big Noise from Winnetka Medley"	The Club Collette Band	7:18
9.	"Doubts"	Evgueni Galperine and Sacha Galperine	1:04
10.	"Ruth Call"	Evgueni Galperine and Sacha Galperine	2:40
11.	"I Revered Him"	Evgueni Galperine and Sacha Galperine	2:31
12.	"I Have to Talk to You All"	Evgueni Galperine and Sacha Galperine	1:45
13.	"Losing It"	Evgueni Galperine and Sacha Galperine	2:08
14.	"The Pills"	Evgueni Galperine and Sacha Galperine	0:43
15.	"The Boys Wouldn't Sign"	Evgueni Galperine and Sacha Galperine	1:41
16.	"Make It Right"	Evgueni Galperine and Sacha Galperine	1:14
17.	"My Father Is Dead to Me"	Evgueni Galperine and Sacha Galperine	2:46

== See also ==
- Madoff (miniseries)
- Pyramid scheme
