= Lappin =

Lappin is a surname. Notable people with the surname include:

== People ==
- Harry Lappin (1879–1925), English footballer
- Jessica Lappin (born 1975), Democratic New York City Councilwoman
- Lauren Lappin (born 1984), American softball player, Olympic silver medallist
- Linda Lappin (born 1953), poet, novelist, and translator from Tennessee
- Matthew Lappin (born 1976), Australian rules footballer
- Nigel Lappin (born 1976), former professional Australian rules footballer
- Peter Lappin (born 1965), professional ice hockey player
- Ryan Lappin, Australian television personality and musician
- Simon Lappin (born 1983), Scottish professional footballer

== See also ==
- Robert I. Lappin Charitable Foundation, Jewish non-profit organization that operates programs for Jewish youth
