= Manoff =

Manoff is a surname. Notable people with the surname include:

- Arnold Manoff (1914–1965), American screenwriter
- Dinah Manoff (born 1958), American actor and television director

== See also ==
- Madoff (surname)
- Manof
