= Booker Wright =

Booker Wright may refer to:

- Booker Wright, subject of Booker's Place: A Mississippi Story
- Louis Booker Wright, American author, educator and librarian
