= Philanthropy in the United States =

Overview article

Philanthropy in the United States is the practice of voluntary, charitable giving by individuals, corporations and foundations to benefit important social needs. Its long history dates back to the early colonial period, when Puritans founded Harvard College and other institutions. Philanthropy has been a major source of funding for various sectors, such as religion, higher education, health care, and the arts. Philanthropy has also been influenced by different social movements, such as abolitionism, women's rights, civil rights, and environmentalism. Some of the most prominent philanthropists in American history include George Peabody, Andrew Carnegie, John D. Rockefeller, Henry Ford, Herbert Hoover, and Bill Gates.

Charitable giving in the US, 2009

Statistics indicate the United States is the most generous country in the world over the decade until December 2019.

As of 2023, the majority of charitable dollars in the U.S. went to religion (24%), education (14%), human services (14%), grantmaking foundations (13%), public-society benefit (10%). In 2023, the largest source of charitable giving came from individuals, who gave $374.40 billion, representing 67% of total giving, according to the Giving USA (Giving USA 2024: The Annual Report on Philanthropy for the Year 2023, a publication of Giving USA Foundation, 2024, researched and written by the Indiana University Lilly Family School of Philanthropy.)

== Colonial era ==
=== Established and voluntary religion ===
What would become an American tradition of giving is seen as early as 1630 when Puritan John Winthrop shared a sermon called "A Model on Christian Charity" while on board the ship Arbella. (John Winthrop: Biography as History; Francis J. Bremer; Continuum; 2009) In this sermon, Winthrop shared an ideal that people coming to this new land create a "city on a hill" to serve as an example to others of fulfilling "great responsibilities" like caring for the less fortunate. (http://history.hanover.edu/texts/winthmod.html)

Taxes from local and colonial government supported the established churches in New England, which were Congregational, and in the South, which were Anglican. A much faster rate of growth appeared in entirely voluntary religious denominations, especially the Methodists and Baptists, and among the Presbyterians especially on the frontier. German and Dutch immigrants supported their Reformed churches in Pennsylvania and New York without tax money.

The first corporation founded in the Thirteen Colonies was Harvard College (1636), designed primarily to them train young men for the clergy. A leading theorist was the Puritan theologian Cotton Mather (1662–1728), who in 1710 published a widely read essay, Bonifacius, or an Essay to Do Good. Mather worried that the original idealism had eroded, so he advocated philanthropic benefaction as a way of life. Though his context was Christian, his idea was also characteristically American and explicitly Classical, on the threshold of the Enlightenment.

Let no man pretend to the Name of A Christian, who does not Approve the proposal of A Perpetual Endeavour to Do Good in the World.… The Christians who have no Ambition to be [useful], Shall be condemned by the Pagans; among whom it was a Term of the Highest Honour, to be termed, A Benefactor; to have Done Good, was accounted Honourable. The Philosopher [i.e., Aristotle ], being asked why Every one desired so much to look upon a Fair Object! He answered That it was a Question of a Blind man. If any man ask, as wanting the Sense of it, What is it worth the while to Do Good in the world! I must Say, It Sounds not like the Question of a Good man.

Mather's many practical suggestions for doing good had strong civic emphases – founding schools, libraries, hospitals, useful publications, etc. They were not primarily about rich people helping poor people, but about private initiatives for public good, focusing on quality of life. Two young Americans whose prominent lives, they later said, were influenced by Mather's book, were Benjamin Franklin and Paul Revere.

=== Ethnic and religious groups ===
Voluntary charitable organizations established by ethnic and religious groups, for their own people, originated in the colonial era and grew much stronger in the 19th century. As assimilation took place most of the European groups merged into a general "American" population; the ethnic charitable societies sharply declined by 1900. Minority ethnic groups and races that did not amalgamate extensively continued their separate operations, as did religious charities into the 21st century.

The Puritans of New England and the Quakers Of Pennsylvania were the pioneers before 1700 in establishing charitable institutions, philanthropic operations, and their own schools. Eventually most of the many religious denominations set up charitable institutions as well as their own seminaries or colleges. The first ethnic group to mobilize served as a model for many others – it was the Scots Charitable Society of Boston, started in 1657. In 1754 the Episcopal Charitable Society of Boston Was oriented toward recent English immigrants. In 1768, the Charitable Irish Society of Boston opened for Irish Protestants. Eventually German and French immigrants set up their own benevolent societies.

=== Benjamin Franklin ===
Benjamin Franklin (1706–1790) was an activist and theorist of American philanthropy. Franklin espoused a philosophy that each person should give to advance the common good at a level commensurate to his or her means. Franklin also "believed in direct solicitation, asking for a specified amount, asking for gifts based on the giver’s means, asking for the largest gifts first and inviting all potential donors to be part of the project." (American Philanthropy, Robert H. Bremner, Chicago University Press, 1988) He was much influenced by Daniel Defoe's An essay upon projects (1697) and Mather's Bonifacius. Franklin specialized in motivating his fellow Philadelphians into projects for the betterment of the city. As a young tradesman in 1727, he formed the "Junto": a 12-member club that met weekly to consider current issues and needs. One of the qualifications for membership was the "love [of] mankind in general". In 1729 he founded a weekly newspaper the Philadelphia Gazette, and for the next thirty years he used the Junto as a sort of think-tank to generate and vet philanthropic ideas, and the Gazette to test and mobilize public support, recruit volunteers, and fund-raise. His system led to the creation of America's first subscription library (1731), a volunteer fire association, a fire insurance association, (1752 – through fundraising with a challenge grant), the paving and patrolling of public streets, the finance and construction of a civic meeting house, and many others. A world-class physicist himself, he promoted scientific organizations including the Philadelphia Academy (1751) – which became the University of Pennsylvania – as well as the American Philosophical Society (1743) to enable scientific researchers from all 13 colonies to communicate. Fellow diplomat John Adams reported that in France "there was scarcely a peasant or citizen" who "did not consider him as a friend to humankind."

== 19th century ==
The new nation had weak national, state and local governments. A strong civil society was built by Volunteers in a culture of collaboration. In 1835, French historian Alexis de Tocqueville wrote about the "peculiar practice" of people in the new American colonies supporting "private initiatives for public good, focusing on quality of life" in his book "Democracy in America." He said voluntary, charitable giving was a distinct cornerstone of American democracy; and he shared, "Americans of all ages, all conditions, and all dispositions constantly form associations…in this manner they found hospitals, prisons, and schools." (American Philanthropy, Robert H. Bremner, Chicago University Press, 1988) He also noted that "voluntary associations" permeated American life, as a distinguishing feature of the American character and culture. Americans, he said, did not rely on others – government, an aristocracy, or the church – to solve their public problems; rather, they did it themselves, through voluntary associations, which is to say, philanthropy, which was characteristically democratic.

Important American philanthropists of the first half of the 19th century ere Gerrit Smith and the industrialist Arthur Tappan and to a lesser extent his brother Lewis.

=== Capt. Robert Richard Randall ===
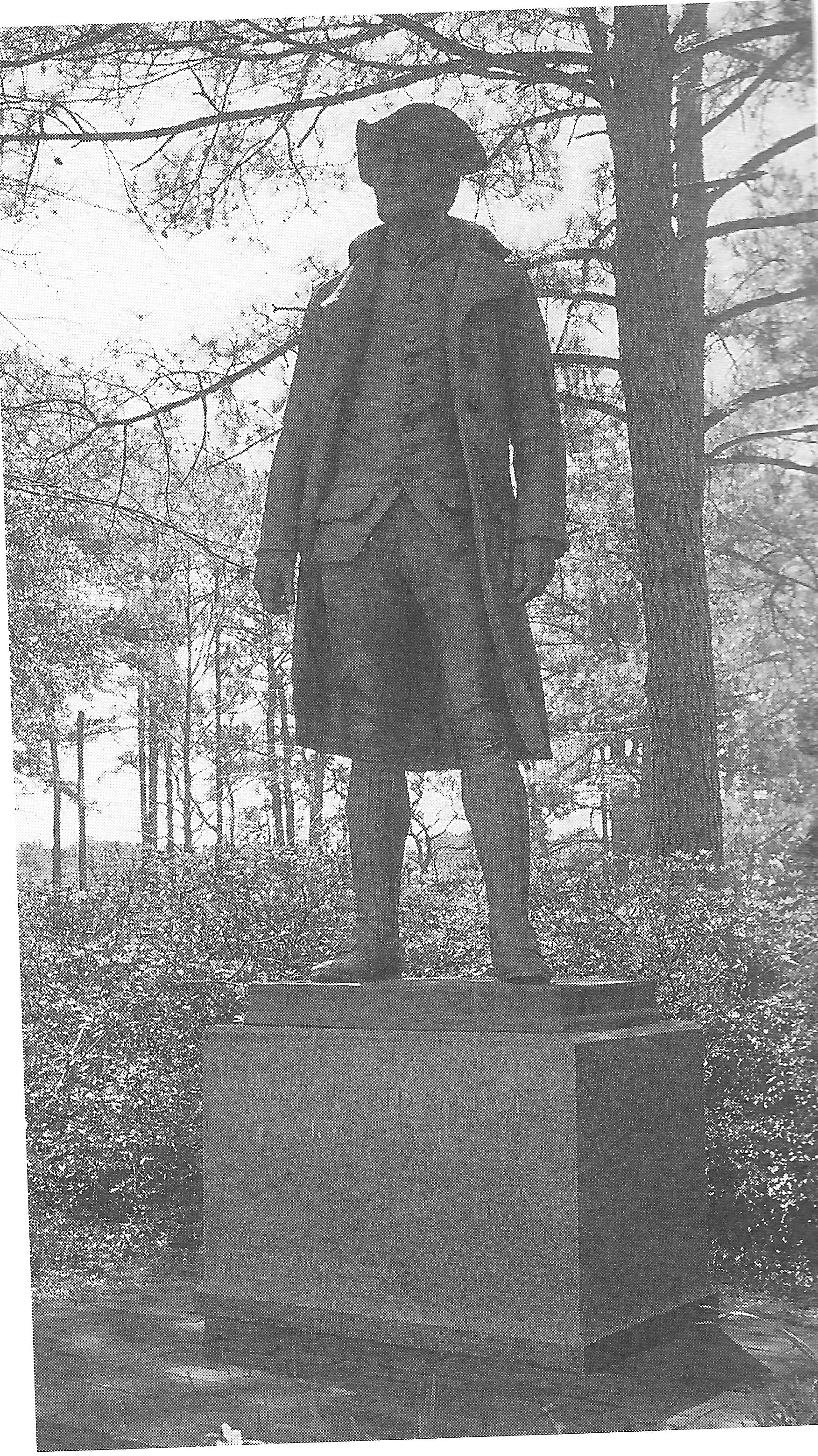

One of the earliest charities formed in the United States still exists today, The Sailors' Snug Harbor, formed by philanthropist Capt. Robert Richard Randall of New York who asked that his estate be used in perpetuity to care for "aged, decrepit, and worn-out sailors". Capt. Randall passed in 1801, but his charity continues to this day to help retired Merchant Mariners across the United States.

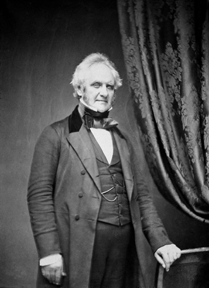
George Peabody

=== George Peabody ===
By the 1820s, newly rich American businessmen were establishing philanthropic work, especially with respect to private colleges and hospitals. George Peabody (1795–1869), a merchant and banker based in Baltimore and London, became the father of modern philanthropy. Historian Roderick Nash argues that Peabody was a disciple of Benjamin Franklin, who joined hard work with frugality, punctuality, and a strong public spirit. Peabody was a pioneer, whose success in philanthropy set the standard for American millionaires in a way that was unique in the world. Philanthropy in Europe typically came from old aristocrat families with vast inherited wealth who built palaces and museums that were eventually opened to the public. The American way was for the self-made millionaires to become self-made philanthropists, a model that was perfected in the next generation by Andrew Carnegie (1835–1919) and John D Rockefeller (1839–1937). They agreed with Peabody that riches produced a duty to give most of it back to the community through specialized permanent foundations. Peabody was especially imaginative – and relied on his own memories of poverty and self learning to figure new ways to educate and culturally enrich the next generation of poor youth, and thereby promote more equality in American society. Jacksonian democracy promoted equality in politics; he promoted equality and culture through libraries, schools, museums and colleges. He rejected doling out bundles of cash to the poor as a waste of money in comparison to building permanent institutions that produced a steady stream of benefits. His last great benefaction was the Peabody Education Fund, which had a dramatic impact in improving southern public schools. It was the first major philanthropy that gave large sums to very poor Blacks on the same terms as whites, albeit within the strict limits imposed by Southern culture regarding racial segregation and white supremacy. Even more important was the institutional framework that Peabody devised, of a permanent professional foundation, run by experts in philanthropy, who were guided by and indeed invented the best practices of the day.

=== Jewish philanthropy ===
In the mid-19th century, German Jewish immigrants operated businesses and financial institutions in cities across the country. They set up extensive charitable institutions, generously giving money and volunteer time of charity a high prestige activity. After 1920 the newer Yiddish-speaking Jewish community centered in New York City became active in philanthropy.

=== Local millionaires ===
By the late 19th century, about a third of the successful local businessman were making philanthropic donations. Albert Shaw editor of the magazine American Review of Reviews in 1893 examined philanthropic activities of millionaires in several major cities. The highest rate was Baltimore where 49% of the millionaires were active givers; New York City ranked last. Cincinnati millionaires favored musical and artistic ventures; Minneapolis millionaires gave to the state university and the public library; Philadelphians often gave to overseas relief, and the education of blacks and Indians. Boston had a weak profile, apart from donations to Harvard and the Massachusetts General Hospital. Railroad leaders seldom focused on local issues, since they had responsibility for much larger territories. They approve the work of the railroad YMCAs in uplifting the labor force, though they seldom gave them any corporate money. One exception came in 1882 when the president of the Illinois Central Railroad provided a salary of $50 a month for six months for a YMCA Evangelist in Cairo, Illinois, hoping "he will be able to accomplish some good in that ungodly place." Executives rarely used the railroad's financial resources for philanthropic goals. Occasionally they donated land for public schools or colleges, assuming it would have a positive impact on the selling price of their nearby lands.

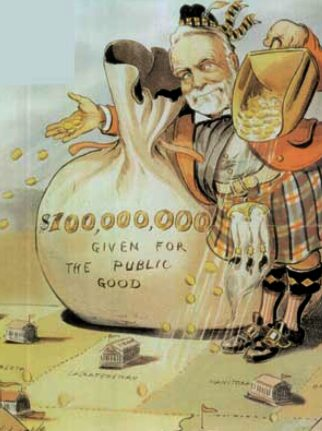
Andrew Carnegie's philanthropy. Puck magazine cartoon by Louis Dalrymple, 1903

=== Andrew Carnegie ===
Andrew Carnegie (1835–1919) was the most influential leader of philanthropy on a national (rather than local) scale. After selling his giant steel company in the 1890s he devoted himself to establishing philanthropic organizations, and making direct contributions to many educational cultural and research institutions. His final and largest project was the Carnegie Corporation of New York, founded in 1911 with a $25 million endowment, later enlarged to $135 million. In all he gave away $350 million, or 90% of his fortune.

The establishment of public libraries in the United States, Britain, and in dominions and colonies of the British Empire started a legacy that still operates on a daily basis for millions of people. The first Carnegie library opened in 1883 in Dunfermline, Scotland. His method was to build and stock a modern library, on condition that the local authority provided site and keep it in operation. In 1885, he gave $500,000 to Pittsburgh for a public library, and in 1886, he gave $250,000 to Allegheny City for a music hall and library, and $250,000 to Edinburgh, Scotland, for a free library. In total Carnegie gave $55 million to some 3,000 libraries, in 47 American states and overseas. As VanSlyck (1991) shows, the last years of the 19th century saw acceptance of the idea that libraries should be available to the American public free of charge. However the design of the idealized free library was at the center of a prolonged and heated debate. On one hand, the library profession called for designs that supported efficiency in administration and operation; on the other, wealthy philanthropists favored buildings that reinforced the paternalistic metaphor and enhanced civic pride. Between 1886 and 1917, Carnegie reformed both library philanthropy and library design, encouraging a closer correspondence between the two. Using the corporation as his model, Carnegie introduced many of the philanthropic practices of the modern foundation. At the same time, he rejected the rigid social and spatial hierarchy of the 19th-century library. In over 1,600 buildings that he funded and in hundreds of others influenced by its forms, Carnegie helped create an American public library type that embraced the planning principles espoused by librarians while extending a warmer welcome to the reading public. There was some opposition, for example in Canada where anti-American and labour spokesman opposed his libraries, in fear of the influence of a powerful American, and in protest against his breaking a strike in 1892.

Carnegie was in fact transforming his wealth into cultural power independent of Governmental or political controls. However he transcended national boundaries – he identified so much with Britain that at one point he thought of running for Parliament. In Canada and Britain he worked with like-minded local intellectual and cultural leaders who shared his basic values to promote an urgently needed Canadian or British cultural, intellectual, and educational infrastructure. In those countries, the rich industrialists rarely supported national philanthropy. He also set up numerous permanent foundations, especially in pursuit of world peace, such as the Carnegie Endowment for International Peace formed in 1910 with a $10 million endowment.

In Gospel of Wealth (1889), Carnegie proselytized the rich about their responsibilities to society. His homily had an enormous influence in its day, and into the 21st century. One early disciple was Phoebe Hearst, wife of the founder of the Hearst dynasty in San Francisco. She expanded the Carnegie approach to include women declaring that leisured women had a sacred duty to give to causes, especially progressive education and reform, that would benefit their communities, help those excluded or marginalized from America's mainstream, and advance women's careers as reformers and political leaders.

== 1900 to 1980 ==
Prominent American philanthropists of the early 20th century were John D. Rockefeller and his son, Julius Rosenwald (1862–1932) and Margaret Olivia Slocum Sage (1828–1918).

=== Rockefeller network ===
The senior John D. Rockefeller (1839–1937) retired from business in the 1890s; he and his son John D. Rockefeller Jr. (1874–1960) made large-scale national philanthropy systematic especially regarding the study and application of modern medicine, higher, education and scientific research. Of the $530 million the elder Rockefeller gave away, $450 million went to medicine. Their top advisor Frederick Taylor Gates designed several very large philanthropies that were staffed by experts who designed ways to attack problems systematically rather than let the recipients decide how to deal with the problem.

One of the largest of the Rockefeller philanthropies was the General Education Board which focused on higher education medical school, and Uplift of the poverty-stricken rural South, both black and white. It funded rural schools, helped modernize farming practices, and work hard to eradicate hookworm. It promoted the county agent system run by the U.S. Department of Agriculture that brought research from state agricultural experiment stations into actual operation on millions of farms. Rockefeller gave it $180 million starting in 1903. Its head Frederick Gates envisioned "The Country School of To-Morrow," wherein "young and old will be taught in practicable ways how to make rural life beautiful, intelligent, fruitful, recreative, healthful, and joyous." By 1934 the Board was making grants of $5.5 million a year. It spent nearly all its money by 1950 and closed in 1964.

=== Hoover in Europe ===
The Commission for Relief in Belgium (CRB) was an international (predominantly American) organization that arranged for the supply of food to German-occupied Belgium and northern France during the First World War. It was led by Herbert Hoover. Between 1914 and 1919, the CRB operated entirely with voluntary efforts and was able to feed 11,000,000 Belgians by raising the necessary money, obtaining voluntary contributions of money and food, shipping the food to Belgium and controlling its there, For example, the CRB shipped 697,116,000 pounds of flour to Belgium. Biographer George Nash finds that by the end of 1916, Hoover "stood preeminent in the greatest humanitarian undertaking the world had ever seen." Biographer William Leuchtenburg adds, "He had raised and spent millions of dollars, with trifling overhead and not a penny lost to fraud. At its peak, his organization was feeding nine million Belgians and French a day. When the U.S. entered the war President Wilson gave Hoover charge of the American food supply.

When the war ended in late 1918, Wilson gave Hoover control of the American Relief Administration (ARA), with the mission of finding food and coal for Central and Eastern Europe. The ARA fed millions. U.S. government funding of $100 million for the ARA expired in the summer of 1919, and Hoover transformed the ARA into a private organization, raising millions of dollars from private donors. He had numerous efficient aides, such as Anson Goodyear, who handled coal supplies in Austria, Hungary and Poland. According to Kendrick Clements:

The gregarious, energetic, and ingenious Goodyear cheerfully accepted Hoover's orders to do anything necessary to get the coal moving. Employing his native charm and his authority to provide or withhold food shipments, he calmed strikes and opened borders. At one point, he got Hoover to send him $25,000 worth of tobacco to distribute among miners. Within a month, his unorthodox methods contributed to doubling coal production in Central Europe.

Under the auspices of the ARA, the European Children's Fund fed millions of starving children. When attacked for distributing food to Russia, which was under Bolshevik control, Hoover snapped, "Twenty million people are starving. Whatever their politics, they shall be fed!"

=== Ford Foundation ===
The Ford Foundation was founded in 1936, and after the deaths of Edsel Ford and Henry Ford it was given by the family all of the non-voting shares of the Ford Motor Company. The family kept all the voting shares, which although far fewer in number, assured its continuous control of the corporation. Ford's profits, dividends, and increases in stock value went overwhelmingly to the Foundation. In 1950 the family gave up control of the Foundation, Keeping a few seats on the board until 1976. In 1955 the Foundation sold most of its Ford shares. By then it passed the Rockefeller Foundation to become the largest philanthropy, with very large scale projects in the United States and around the world. Domestically, it focused on inner-city revitalization, the development of public broadcasting, and support for the arts. It invested heavily in graduate training programs in American and European research universities, especially in promoting international studies. Civil rights and aid to minority groups became a major priority after 1950. It started with an effort had building minority communities and promoting integration. However, by the 1970s it had switched to a top-down strategy of training new minority leaders. One result was the support for Black Power elements hostile to integration, such as CORE, as well as black studies programs on campuses. Another was resentment especially as Jewish leaders were pushed out of the civil rights movement by the new black generation. Outside the United States, it established a network of human rights organizations, promoted democracy, gave large numbers of fellowships for young leaders to study in the United States.

== Recent philanthropists ==
The John D. and Catherine T. MacArthur Foundation has awarded more than $6 billion since its first grants in 1978. It has an endowment of $6.3 billion and provides approximately $270 million annually in grants and impact investments. It is best known for the annual MacArthur Fellows Program, often dubbed "genius grants", which makes $625,000 no-strings-attached awards annually to about two dozen creative individuals in diverse fields.

=== Gates and Buffett ===
During the past few years, computer entrepreneur Bill Gates, who co-founded Microsoft, and billionaire investor and Berkshire Hathaway Chairman Warren Buffett have donated many billions of dollars to charity and have challenged their wealthy peers to donate half of their assets to philanthropic causes. The Bill and Melinda Gates Foundation has led campaigns to eradicate malaria and river blindness, with Warren Buffett donating $31 billion in 2006 to the Gates Foundation.

Financier Ronald Perelman signed the Gates-Buffett Pledge in August 2010, committing up to half his assets to be designated for the benefit of charitable causes (after his family and children have been provided for), and gave $70 million to charity in 2008 alone.

Phil Knight, a co-founder of Nike Corporation, and his wife Penny, have given or pledged more than $2 billion. Oregon Health and Science University, Stanford University and the University of Oregon have received the bulk of their philanthropy.

=== LLC ===
Recent philanthropists have decided to forego the Foundation route in favor of utilizing a limited liability company (LLC) to pursue their philanthropic goals and an example of philanthrocapitalism. This allows the organization to avoid three main legal constrictions on Foundations in the US. In December 2015, Mark Zuckerberg and his spouse Priscilla Chan pledged to donate over the decades 99% of their Facebook shares, then valued at $45 billion, to the Chan Zuckerberg Initiative, a newly created LLC with focuses on health and education.

- Foundations must give away 5% of assets annually.
- Foundations must disclose where the grants are going and generally can only give to 501c3s registered charities.
- Foundations must avoid funding or even advocating for a side in politics.

The LLC structure allows the philanthropist to keep their initiatives private although there is no requirement that they do. Arnold Ventures far exceeds the transparency requirements placed on Foundations. An LLC is allowed to support for-profit companies that they feel support their mission. And the LLC, therefore, permitted to make and keep any profits made on such an investment. Lastly, an LLC can openly support politicians with whom they agree and advocate for policy positions and even author such policy positions elected officials may opt to use. Lastly, the original donor, such as Mr. Zuckerberg, retains control over the shares donated. If he had donated shares to a Foundation they would no longer be his, nor would he control Facebook, of which he was a co-founder and still runs.

Partial List of Philanthropic LLCs

- Chan Zuckerberg Initiative
- Arnold Ventures LLC
- Omidyar Network
- Emerson Collective

=== Female philanthropists ===
Rosalind P. Walter became a noted philanthropist during the latter part of the 20th century in collaboration with, and independently of, her husband, Henry Glendon Walter Jr. Best known for her support of public television programming in the United States, she has also served as a trustee for the American Museum of Natural History, Long Island University and the Paley Center for Media. MacKenzie Scott totaled over $14 billion in donations from 2019 to 2022, contributing to roughly 1,600 nonprofits. She is currently the 56th-wealthiest in the world with a net-worth of 24.4 billion. Scott acquired her wealth from her share in Amazon, founded by her ex-husband, Jeff Bezos. She was named one of the world's most powerful women by Forbes in 2021, and one of Time’s 100 Most Influential People of 2020.

== 21st century efforts ==
Trends in philanthropy have been affected in various ways by a technological and cultural change. Today, many donations are made through the Internet (see also donation statistics).

=== Journalism ===
Associated Press announced philanthropies had funded an expansion of their global news coverage of climate change. Other philanthropies have given grants to news outlets in order to cover special issues, such as the health pandemic and the war in Yemen. The transition to increased philanthropic funding of journalism comes as traditional revenue streams have declined.

== Who gives ==
According to some charitable giving statistics, as of 2022:

- 60% of American households participate in some sort of charitable giving, (according to The Philanthropy Roundtable).
- The average age of the US donor is 64;
- About 80% of all donations to charities and nonprofit organizations in the US come from individuals and 20% from corporations.
- Those making less than $50,000 a year, and those in the highest income category, give more in relation to total income. The Indiana University Center on Philanthropy has reported that approximately 65% of households earning $100,000 or less donate to charity, and nearly every household exceeding that amount donated to charity.
- those making over $100,000 a year give a smaller share, averaging 4.2%, to charity than those poorer (between $50,000–75,000 a year), who give an average of 7.6%, according to studies by the Chronicle of Philanthropy.
- On the other hand, non-profit institutions depend upon the very rich for philanthropy. According to Ray Madoff, (director of the Forum on Philanthropy and the Public Good at Boston College Law School), speaking in 2019, "charitable giving has become concentrated among the wealthy. Twenty years ago," i.e. 2019, "a lot of small donors providing the essential support for the [Lincoln Center] institution. Now, charitable organizations have become overly reliant on the big donors." (which becomes problematic when those donors have done something controversial) From 2013 to 2019 there was a "quadrupling of the value of publicly reported" charitable donations to around $4 Billion.
- Religious people "are more likely to give money to charitable organizations" and more likely to give larger amounts of money, with Jewish people giving the most individually of the three major religions.

=== Religious communities ===
Today, the involvement of religious communities in philanthropic work is still observable, with scholars demonstrating that, "individuals who are religious are more likely to give money to charitable organizations" and more likely to give larger amounts of money "than those who are not religious." These monetary contributions can be either charitable donations made to religiously run-or secular charities and institutions, or religious organizations and religions themselves, as a means of sustaining the institutions. When looking at the total amount of charitable giving in the United States, the largest proportion are donations made to religious congregations, nearly 29%. American Jewish, Muslim, Catholic, and Protestant communities all, nearly equally, prioritize contributing to their congregational houses of worship above other causes.

Frequent attendance at religious services is linked to both the likelihood of giving to religion and to making larger gifts to religion.

The impact of American religious communities in philanthropy and charitable giving can be seen across a variety of faith communities, including the Protestant, Catholic, Jewish and Muslim communities. Institutes like the Lilly Family School of Philanthropy's Lake Institute on Faith and Giving not only conduct research on the practice of faith-based giving, but also offer education and training on how to better engage in and manage religious philanthropy.

(On the other hand, a University of California Berkeley study analyzing experimental "data from a 2004 national survey of more than 1,300 Americans" found "that Those who were less religious were motivated more to help others, such as giving food or money to the homeless." According to one of the authors of the study, Laura Maslow, the conclusion – that atheists are more influenced by "emotions to show generosity to strangers" – was "replicated in three large, systematic studies".)

==== American Jews ====
A 2013 study showed, that more than 90 percent of Jewish donors give to causes unrelated to their faith. That Jewish donors – especially those of modest means – are among the most generous Americans. As well as that many of them make a high proportion of their gifts to causes that have nothing to do with their faith. According to 2017 publication, "America’s Jewish Community Leads in Per Capita Giving." Across the 2010s, estimates of the total value of Jewish philanthropic contributions varies from $24 to $46.3 billion, depending on estimation methodology. Definitional issues account for a large part of the variance in these estimates: when deciding what donations count as Jewish philanthropy, methodologies vary based on how to account for sources of the donations and intents of charitable causes.

==== American Muslims ====
When it comes to American Muslims, their "philanthropic patterns and preferences", mostly are "aligned remarkably well with other faith groups and the general public." Key differences include greater likelihood to have their philanthropic donations motivated by their "sense of religious duty" for 17% of American Muslims, contrasted with the 10% reported in the general American public, and a "feeling that those with more should aid those with less" for 20% of American Muslims, contrasted with only 12% in the general public.

In a study conducted by the Institute for Social Policy and Understanding, when compared to other American faith groups, Muslims were found to be the most likely to "contribute to organizations" combating poverty in the United States that were "outside their faith communities" (81%). This statistic remains true despite the fact that a notable amount of American Muslims are immigrants to the United States, demonstrating an "opposite trend" to what may be expected. After domestic poverty, 58% of those surveyed prioritized non-domestic relief as a philanthropic cause.

The study also found that there were no major distinctions between the giving patterns of men and women, but did observe age and race-based differences. Younger American Muslims were much more likely to give to domestic causes than their elders, as well as to overseas causes. When it comes to race, Black Muslims are more likely to give to both educational causes within the American Muslim community, as well as to "youth & family services" and "arts & culture causes" both outside of their community.

== Controversy ==
=== Taxes ===
Chuck Collins argues that through tax deductions tax payers subsidize philanthropic donations in the form of lost revenue.

=== The Charitable-Industrial Complex ===
Peter Buffett, philanthropist and son of Warren Buffett, notes the enormous size of the charitable industry

Between 2001 and 2011, the number of nonprofits increased 25 percent. Their growth rate now exceeds that of both the business and government sectors. It’s a massive business, with approximately $316 billion given away in 2012 in the United States alone and more than 9.4 million employed.

and worries that it is not effectively dealing with the problems caused by the system that generates the huge profits that finance philanthropy. In philanthropy meeting, where heads of state meet with investment managers and corporate leaders – they are "searching for answers with their right hand to problems that others in the room have created with their left".

=== Wealth bias ===
At least one researcher (Jane Mayer) has noted the phenomenon of wealthy donors contributing to ostensibly charitable institutions (think tanks, educational programs) that work to advance "political policies" in the financial interests of their contributors. In particular she points to a movement by wealthy conservatives, (the Koch brothers – Charles and David – in particular) to donate not only to the arts, sciences and education, but to use philanthropy as "the weapon of choice" in their political war against (what they believed) was over taxation of the wealthy and over regulation of their businesses. Mayer argues that while these donations are not political donations in the conventional sense of campaign funding to win elections, they have "changed the course of American politics" by changing how Americans think – convincing the public of the efficacy of Climate change denial, "lowering taxes and rolling back regulations, slashing the welfare state, and obliterating the limits on campaign spending". The wealthy don't just spend heavily on political interests they are more likely to contribute to their own private foundations, donor-advised funds and educational institutions.

The concentration of funding in the hands of a few, give that few enormous power and leave those they fund reliant on their whims.

==== Dark Money ====
Mayer also complains that unlike campaign financing, under American law, these charitable donations can be done anonymously through charities like Donors Trust, because the charities are not required to report the source of the donations.

=== Reputation laundering ===
Some high-profile philanthropists have been accused of "reputation laundering", (i.e. using highly-visibility donations to worthy causes to improve their reputations and obscure their history of wrongdoing). Some accused of this practice include Russian oligarchs who donated between $372 million and $435 million to charitable institutions in the United States; the Sackler family, whose reputation was damaged by their role in the opioid crisis and marketing and sale of OxyContin, and who some charitable institutions have now refused to take any more donations from and/or removed the Sackler name from institutions they donated money to.

== See also ==
- The Giving Pledge
- Patronage
