= Madoff (miniseries) =

2016 American miniseries

- Promotional poster
- Genre: Drama
- Created by: Ben Robbins
- Written by: Ben Robbins
- Directed by: Raymond De Felitta
- Starring: Richard Dreyfuss; Blythe Danner; Peter Scolari; Frank Whaley; Michael Rispoli; Lewis Black; Tom Lipinski; Danny Deferrari; Erin Cummings; Annie Heise; Michael Bryan French; David Margulies; Liz Larsen; Jason Kravits; Bruce Altman; David Aaron Baker; Charles Grodin; Jack Koenig
- Composer: Stephen Raynor Endelman
- Country of origin: United States
- Original language: English
- No. of episodes: 4

Production
- Executive producers: Linda Berman; Joe Pichirallo
- Cinematography: Frank DeMarco
- Production companies: Lincoln Square Productions; ABC Studios

Original release
- Network: ABC
- Release: February 3 – February 4, 2016

Madoff is a 2016 American television miniseries written by Ben Robbins, inspired by Brian Ross' book The Madoff Chronicles, about the Madoff investment scandal. The Madoff investment scandal was a fraud scheme perpetrated by Bernie Madoff, a former stockbroker, investment advisor, and financier. He is the former non-executive chairman of the NASDAQ stock market and the admitted operator of a Ponzi scheme that is considered the largest financial fraud in American history. The miniseries aired on ABC over two nights, February 3 and 4, 2016.

== Cast and characters ==
=== Main ===
- Richard Dreyfuss as Bernie Madoff
- Blythe Danner as Ruth Madoff
- Peter Scolari as Peter Madoff
- Frank Whaley as Harry Markopolos
- Michael Rispoli as Frank DiPascali
- Lewis Black as Gregory Perkins
- Tom Lipinski as Mark Madoff
- Danny Deferrari as Andrew Madoff
- Erin Cummings as Eleanor Squillari
- Annie Heise as Stephanie Mikesell
- Michael Bryan French as Blake North
- Alexandra Neil as Monica Noel
- Richard Bekins as Jeremy Billings
- David Margulies as Elie Wiesel
- Liz Larsen as Sheryl Weinstein
- Jason Kravits as Frank Avellino
- Bruce Altman as Gary Flumenbaum
- David Aaron Baker as Nathan Rubenstein
- Charles Grodin as Carl J. Shapiro
- Jamie Carroll as Shana Madoff
- Jack Koenig as Grant Ward

=== Other ===
- Lyne Renee as Catherine Hooper
- Ben Dreyfuss as Young Bernie Madoff
- Stephen Gevedon as Bob Jaffe
- Suzanne H. Smart as Annette Bongiorno
- Daniel Gerroll as Rene de La Villehuchet
- Scott Barry as Bernie Madoff's Driver

== Episodes ==
No.	Title	Directed by	Written by	Original release date	US viewers (millions)
1	"Millions to Billions"	Raymond De Felitta	Ben Robbins	February 3, 2016	7.08
2	"Catch Me If You Cancer"	Raymond De Felitta	Ben Robbins	February 3, 2016	7.08
3	"Redemptions"	Raymond De Felitta	Ben Robbins	February 4, 2016	6.70
4	"Fallout"	Raymond De Felitta	Ben Robbins	February 4, 2016	6.70

== Reception ==
The miniseries has received favorable reviews from critics. On Metacritic, it holds a 61/100 rating based on 25 reviews. On Rotten Tomatoes, it has an approval rating of 68% based on 31 reviews, with an average rating of 6/10. The site's critics consensus reads: "Madoff boasts a knockout performance from Richard Dreyfuss, whose obvious enjoyment of the role helps make up for the miniseries' surplus of polish and overall lack of perspective."

=== Awards and nominations ===
Year	Award	Category	Nominee(s)	Result	Ref.
2017	Directors Guild of America Awards	Outstanding Directorial Achievement in Movies for Television and Miniseries	Raymond De Felitta	Nominated	
2017	Writers Guild of America Awards	Long Form – Adapted	Ben Robbins; Based on the book The Madoff Chronicles by Brian Ross	Nominated	
