= Diana B. Henriques =

American journalist (born 1948)

Diana Blackmon Henriques (born December 1948) is an American financial journalist and author working in New York City. Since 1989, she has been a reporter on the staff of The New York Times working on staff until December 2011 and under contract as a contributing writer thereafter.

== Early life and education ==
Henriques was born in Bryan, Texas, and raised primarily in Roanoke, Virginia, where she was introduced to journalism through the Junior Achievement program at her public high school. Graduating in 1966, she was awarded a scholarship to The George Washington University's Elliott School of International Affairs in Washington, D.C., where she worked on the campus newspaper, The Hatchet. In September 1969, she graduated with distinction, Phi Beta Kappa, from what is now the university's Elliott School of International Affairs. In May 2011, Henriques was elected to the George Washington University Board of Trustees.

== Career ==
Soon after her marriage in 1969 to Laurence B. Henriques Jr., she was hired as the editor of The Lawrence Ledger, a small weekly paper covering Lawrence Township, N.J. After working at several local and regional daily newspapers, including The Philadelphia Inquirer, Henriques joined Barron's magazine as a staff writer in 1986.

In 1989, she was hired by The New York Times, where she earned the 1999 Gerald Loeb Award for Deadline and/or Beat Writing for as part of a team covering the near collapse of Long-Term Capital Management.

In 2003, she was elected to the board of governors of the Society of American Business Editors and Writers and served until 2016. In 2007, she was cited by the New York Financial Writers Association for "having made a significant long-term contribution to the advancement of financial journalism".

At The New York Times, Henriques has worked on several collaborative projects with reporters from other departments. In 2001, she and the national education writer examined serious quality control problems in the nation's scholastic testing industry. After the terrorist attacks of September 2001, she worked with a reporter on the metropolitan desk to cover federal compensation and charitable relief for the survivors of those killed in the attacks. She also chronicled the fate of Cantor Fitzgerald, the Wall Street trading house that lost three-quarters of its work force in the collapse of the World Trade Center. Her work was included in the "A Nation Challenged" section for which The New York Times won a Pulitzer Prize in 2002.

In 2005, Henriques was a Pulitzer finalist for a series of articles, beginning in July 2004, that exposed the financial exploitation of young soldiers by insurance and investment companies. The articles spurred state regulatory action, congressional hearings, legislative changes, cash refunds for thousands of service members and the adoption of more stringent Pentagon rules governing financial solicitations on and around military bases. For her work on those stories, Henriques was awarded the George Polk Award for Military Reporting, the Worth Bingham Prize and the Goldsmith Prize for Investigative Reporting.

Henriques had also worked on the business news team whose coverage of the post-Enron corporate scandals was cited as a Pulitzer finalist in 2003, and she was a member of the reporting team that was named a Pulitzer finalist for its coverage of the 2008 financial crisis.

In 1981–1982, Henriques was a Senior Fellow at Princeton University's Woodrow Wilson School of Public and International Affairs, where she began researching her first book under a grant from the Daniel and Florence Guggenheim Foundation. The book, The Machinery of Greed: Public Authority Abuse and What to Do About It, was published by Lexington Books in 1986.

Henriques also is the author of three other books: Fidelity's World: The Secret Life and Public Power of the Mutual Fund Giant (Scribners, 1995); The White Sharks of Wall Street: Thomas Mellon Evans and the Original Corporate Raiders (Scribners, 2000); and The Wizard of Lies: Bernie Madoff and The Death of Trust (Times Books/Henry Holt, 2011). The Wizard of Lies grew out of her work as the lead reporter in newspaper's coverage of the scandal that erupted on December 11, 2008, with the arrest of Bernard L. Madoff, the founder of a respected Wall Street brokerage firm who confessed in March 2009 to operating a multibillion-dollar Ponzi scheme. In February 2011, The Times published an exclusive interview with Madoff by Henriques, the first writer to visit him in prison. The interview got wide attention, but a few critics complained that The Times had given too much prominence to details about the book for which Henriques conducted the interview. Her editor publicly explained that it was a common practice at the paper to include the name and publisher of books in articles about their newsworthy contents.

Henriques is currently on the Board of Trustees of George Washington University, the Audit Committee of the Investigate Reporters and Editors (IRE), and the Advisory Board for the Journalism and Women Symposium (JAWS).

The Wizard of Lies was adapted into a movie by HBO and released in May, 2017. The film stars Robert De Niro as Bernie Madoff and Michelle Pfeiffer as Ruth Madoff. Henriques appears as herself in scenes recreating her interviews with Madoff in prison.

A First-Class Catastrophe: The Road to Black Monday, the Worst Day in Wall Street History was published in September, 2017.

Taming the Street: The Old Guard, the New Deal, and FDR's Fight to Regulate American Capitalism was published in 2023 and depicts the beginning of the Securities and Exchange Commission (SEC) under Franklin D. Roosevelt.

== Personal life ==
Henriques and her husband Larry live in Hoboken, New Jersey. She is Episcopalian.

Starting in September 1997, after a repetitive strain injury, Henriques became the first reporter at the New York Times, and one of the first at any major daily newspaper, to produce all her stories via speech recognition software rather than typing. After a decade, she continued to use the software for major writing projects, including her two books published after 1997.

== Works ==
- The Machinery of Greed: Public Authority Abuse and What to Do About It, Lexington Books, 1986.
- Fidelity's World: The Secret Life and Public Power of the Mutual Fund Giant, Scribners, 1995. ISBN 9780684807096
- The Wizard of Lies: Bernie Madoff and The Death of Trust (Times Books/Henry Holt, 2011. ISBN 9780805091342
- First-Class Catastrophe: The Road to Black Monday, the Worst Day in Wall Street History, 2017. ISBN 9781627791649, 1627791647
- Taming the Street: The Old Guard, the New Deal, and FDR's Fight to Regulate American Capitalism, 2023. ISBN 9780593132647
