= Cafe Society (1995 film) =

- Film poster
- Directed by: Raymond De Felitta
- Written by: Raymond De Felitta
- Produced by: Steve Alexander; Elan Sassoon; Carl Colpaert
- Starring: Frank Whaley; Peter Gallagher; Lara Flynn Boyle; John Spencer
- Cinematography: Michael Mayers
- Edited by: Suzy Elmiger
- Music by: Christopher Guardino
- Production company: Cineville
- Distributed by: Cineville
- Release date: May 25, 1995
- Running time: 107 minutes
- Country: United States
- Language: English

Cafe Society is a 1995 American mystery film directed and written by Raymond De Felitta and starring Frank Whaley, Peter Gallagher, Lara Flynn Boyle, and John Spencer. This movie is based on a true story covered in the national press.

== Plot ==
In 1952, New York society playboy Mickey Jelke inherits a large sum of money. He spends his nights out in Manhattan, indulging Broadway bars and in the company of prostitutes and pimps. Unwittingly, Mickey is accused of running a prostitution ring by an unscrupulous undercover cop, aided by Mickey's girlfriend Patricia. He soon becomes embroiled in shadowy web of political exploitation and scandal.

== Cast ==
- Frank Whaley as Mickey Jelke
- Peter Gallagher as Jack Kale
- Lara Flynn Boyle as Pat Ward
- John Spencer as Ray Davioni
- Anna Levine as Erica Steele
- Christopher Murney as Frank Frustinsky
- Paul Guilfoyle as Anthony Liebler
- Richard B. Shull as Samuel Segal
- David Patrick Kelly as J. Roland Sala
- Cynthia Watros as Dianne Harris
