= Eric Swanson =

American lawyer

- Education: University of Minnesota (BA; 1990); Hamline University School of Law (JD; 1993)
- Occupation: Attorney
- Employer: BATS Global Markets
- Title: Senior Vice President, General Counsel, and Secretary
- Spouse: Shana Madoff
- Children: 2

Eric J. Swanson is an American lawyer who worked at the U.S. Securities and Exchange Commission (SEC) and dated and eventually married the daughter of Peter Madoff while the SEC was investigating Madoff's investment firm for what was eventually revealed to be a massive Ponzi scheme. Swanson is currently the Senior Vice President, General Counsel, and Secretary of BATS Global Markets, the third-largest stock exchange in the United States.

Swanson worked at the Securities and Exchange Commission as a lawyer from 1996 to 2006, rising to the level of Assistant Director of the Office of Compliance Inspections and Examinations. Subsequently, he worked at Ameriprise Financial as Vice President of Regulatory Strategy.

Swanson is married to Shana Madoff, who worked at the firm of her uncle Bernard Madoff as a rules and compliance officer and attorney until it was closed when the multibillion-dollar Madoff investment scandal was uncovered. Swanson met Shana Madoff originally when he was conducting an inadequate SEC examination of whether Bernie Madoff's firm was front running customer trades from the market making unit—completely missing the multi-billion dollar Ponzi scheme that Shana's own cousins (Bernie's sons) would expose to the SEC in December 2008.

== Early life and education ==
Swanson, a Minneapolis, Minnesota native, graduated from the University of Minnesota (B.A.; 1990) and obtained a J.D. degree from the Hamline University School of Law (J.D.; 1993).

== Securities and Exchange Commission ==
Following a period of time in which he practiced non-securities-related law, Swanson worked at the Securities and Exchange Commission (SEC) as a lawyer from August 1996 to 2006. While at the SEC, he received in August 2004 a Capital Markets Award, related to work in the area of SEC examinations of conflicts of interest. At the end of his tenure, he was Assistant Director of the Office of Compliance Inspections and Examinations, and reported to the head of the SEC's inspection program, supervising 8–18 staffers.

== Madoff ==
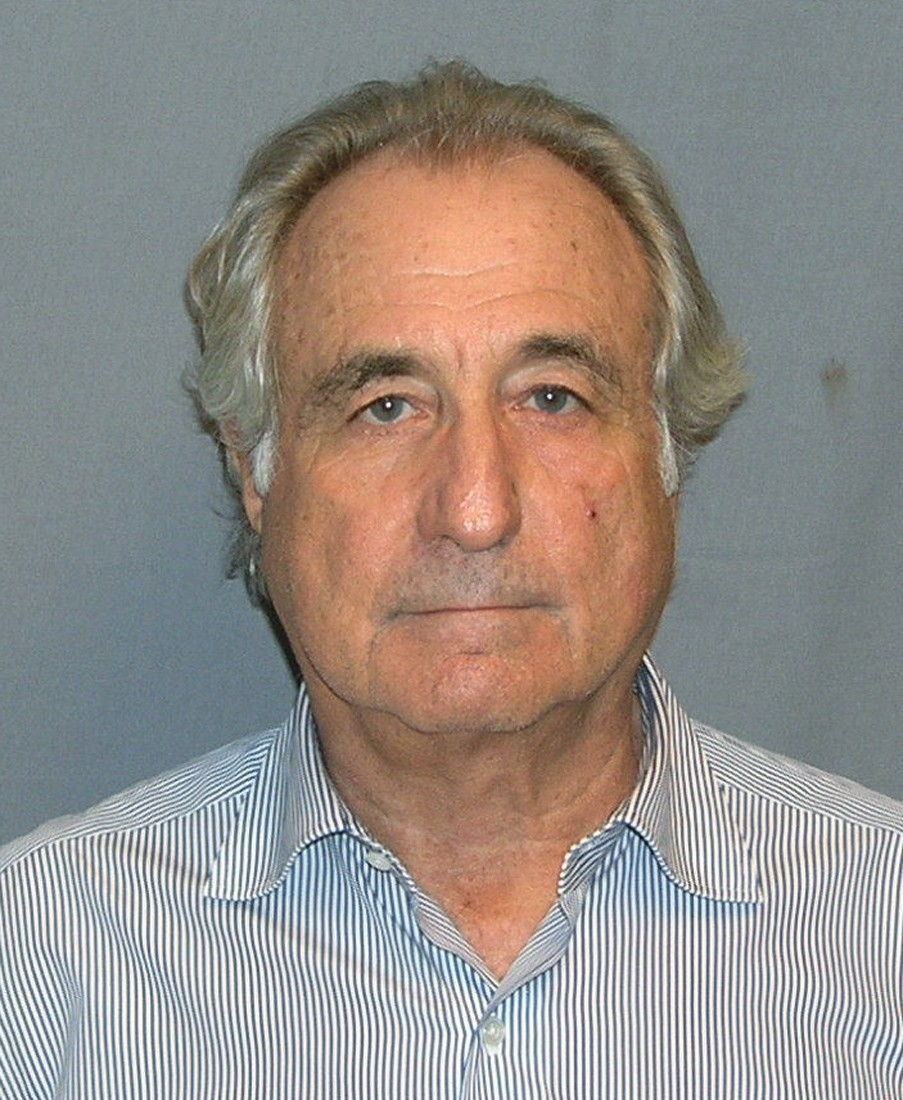
Bernard Madoff

Swanson is the husband of Shana Madoff, who is daughter of Peter Madoff. She is also a niece of Bernard Madoff, who operated a Ponzi scheme that is considered to be the largest financial fraud in U.S. history. She worked under her father at her uncle's firm, Bernard L. Madoff Investment Securities (BMIS), as a rules and compliance officer and attorney. She reported to her father who was responsible for ensuring that BMIS complied with its legal and regulatory obligations, and signed documents assuring the SEC that BMIS's business records were truthful and accurate.

Swanson met Shana Madoff in April 2003. The two met in 2003 at an industry event during an examination of Bernie Madoff by the SEC as to whether Bernie Madoff was front running customer orders, totally missing the multi-billion dollar Ponzi scheme that would be exposed in December 2008. The two had periodic contact thereafter in connection with Swanson speaking at industry events organized by a SIFMA committee on which Shana Madoff sat. During 2003 Swanson sent Shana's father Peter Madoff two regulatory requests, although by the time of the second request Swanson's responsibility for the examination had been transferred to a different Assistant Director at the SEC.

In March 2004, SEC lawyer Genevievette Walker-Lightfoot, who was reviewing Madoff's firm, raised questions to Swanson (Walker-Lightfoot's boss's supervisor) about unusual trading at a Bernie Madoff fund; Walker-Lightfoot was told to instead concentrate on an unrelated matter. Swanson and Walker-Lightfoot's boss asked for her research, but did not act upon it.

In February 2006, Swanson was emailed by Assistant Director John Nee that the SEC's New York Regional Office was investigating a complaint that Bernard Madoff might be running "the biggest Ponzi scheme ever." In April 2006, Swanson began to date Shana Madoff. Swanson reported the relationship to his supervisor who wrote in an email "I guess we won't be investigating Madoff anytime soon."

In 2006, the SEC's New York Enforcement Office, of which Swanson was not a part, closed its investigation of Bernie Madoff. On 15 September 2006, Swanson left the SEC. On 8 December 2006, Swanson and Shana Madoff became engaged.

In 2009, after the scandal broke, SEC Inspector General H. David Kotz investigated, and concluded that there was no evidence that Swanson's romantic relationship with Shana Madoff influenced the closing of the SEC investigation of Madoff. He did conclude, however, that: "Swanson's communication with Shana during the period of time he was engaged in a cause examination of her uncle and father's firm, created the appearance of a potential conflict of interest."

The September 29, 2007, wedding between Swanson and Shana Madoff was attended by Lori Richards, the SEC's Director of Compliance Investigations and Examinations, who oversaw the Division in which Swanson worked at the SEC. In 2008, Bernard Madoff spoke at a business roundtable meeting of his "very close" relationship with an SEC lawyer, and chuckled: "my niece even married one". In April 2009, Richards recused herself from the Madoff investigation.

== Ameriprise Financial ==
Subsequent to working at the SEC, Swanson was a Vice President of regulatory strategy at Ameriprise Financial, a financial services company based in Minnesota.

== BATS ==
Swanson is the Senior Vice President, General Counsel, and Secretary of BATS Global Markets, an electronic stock exchange that is the third-largest stock exchange in the United States, which he joined as General Counsel in January 2008. He was hired in part to assist the exchange in its effort to obtain exchange status from the SEC.
