= The Thing About My Folks =

- Theatrical release poster
- Directed by: Raymond De Felitta
- Written by: Paul Reiser
- Produced by: Paul Reiser; Robert Newmyer; Jeffrey Silver
- Starring: Peter Falk; Paul Reiser; Olympia Dukakis; Elizabeth Perkins
- Cinematography: Dan Gillham
- Edited by: Sheila Amos; David Leonard
- Music by: Steven Argila
- Production company: Outlaw Productions
- Distributed by: Picturehouse
- Release date: September 16, 2005
- Running time: 96 minutes
- Country: United States
- Language: English
- Box office: $823,337

The Thing About My Folks is a 2005 American comedy drama film directed by Raymond De Felitta and starring Peter Falk, Paul Reiser, and Olympia Dukakis. The screenplay by Paul Reiser focuses on the effect a terminal illness has on the marriage of an aging couple and their adult children.

== Plot ==
When Muriel Kleinman unexpectedly leaves her husband Sam, their three daughters Linda, Hillary, Bonnie, and daughter-in-law Rachel set about trying to find her while Sam and his son Ben spend a day in the country inspecting property Ben and his wife are considering buying. The journey evolves into an extended road trip in a restored 1940 Ford Deluxe coupe convertible Sam buys when Ben's car crashes. As time passes, the two men fish, drink, and play pool while discussing the past and reestablishing their relationship.

Ben learns Muriel went on vacation, but after enjoying a leisurely day by herself, began to experience blackouts. The doctors give her six months to live, and Muriel and Sam begin to mend a marriage Sam never realized was deteriorating. She lives through the summer, and Ben realizes he has never seen his parents happier in his life. When Muriel dies, Sam moves in with Ben and his family, and they enjoy life together until Sam himself passes away. Ben and Rachel have another child and name him Martin Samuel Kleinman to honor his parents, whose gravestone bears the Hebrew inscription "מה שלי שלך ומה שלך שלי" ("What is mine is yours and what is yours is mine"), testifying to the truly giving and compassionate relationship Ben's parents had with each other.

== Cast ==
- Peter Falk as Sam Kleinman
- Paul Reiser as Ben Kleinman
- Olympia Dukakis as Muriel Kleinman
- Elizabeth Perkins as Rachel Kleinman
- Ann Dowd as Linda
- Kevin Cahoon as Perky Waiter
- Claire Beckman as Hillary
- Mimi Lieber as Bonnie
- Jerry Seinfeld as himself

== Production ==
The film was shot on location in Minnesota.

== Release ==
The film premiered at the Seattle International Film Festival in June 2005 and went into limited release in the US on September 16, 2005. It grossed $235,341 on 93 screens on its opening weekend and eventually earned $816,403 in the US and $6,934 in foreign markets for a total worldwide box office of $823,337.

== Critical reception ==
The review aggregator Rotten Tomatoes reported an approval rating of 45%, with an average score of 5.6/10, based on 65 reviews. The website's critical consensus reads, "The Thing About My Folks lacks cohesiveness, and the cloying tone makes the talkiness grating."

Roger Ebert of the Chicago Sun-Times observed, "One of the nice things about my job is that I get to enjoy the good parts in movies that aren't really necessary to see. The Thing About My Folks travels familiar movie territory...but we discover once again what a warm and engaging actor Peter Falk is. I can't recommend the movie, but I can be grateful that I saw it, for Falk."

Ned Martel of The New York Times said, "As the crotchety paterfamilias, Peter Falk is convincingly grating, and for a few moments heroic, as he makes his character, Sam Kleinman, into someone the son need not complain about so much. Despite the grumpy, flatulent behavior the script demands of him, Mr. Falk rises above the treacly shenanigans."

Steve Persall of the St. Petersburg Times graded the film B− and commented, "Nothing surprises in The Thing About My Folks except how effective such timeworn material can be when the right people deliver it. The movie contains little that we haven't seen before, but charm can make anything seem a bit fresher. Most credit goes to Peter Falk . . . [who] doesn't merely carry [the film]; he bravely totes it over a mountain of clichés like one of Hannibal's elephants . . . somehow this derivative, predictable story works, probably because of Falk's unforced determination to make that happen."

Robert Koehler of Variety called the film "good-natured but only memorable as a platform for the amusingly feisty Peter Falk" and added, "Pic belongs more to Reiser than to director Raymond De Felitta, who allows the extremely talky script to go on uncut and covers the chatter with an excess of TV-style tracking close-ups."

== Awards and nominations ==
Peter Falk tied with Josh Hartnett (Lucky Number Slevin) for Best Actor honors at the Milan International Film Festival. The National Board of Review cited the film for Excellence In Filmmaking.
