= Raymond De Felitta =

American independent film director, screenwriter and musician

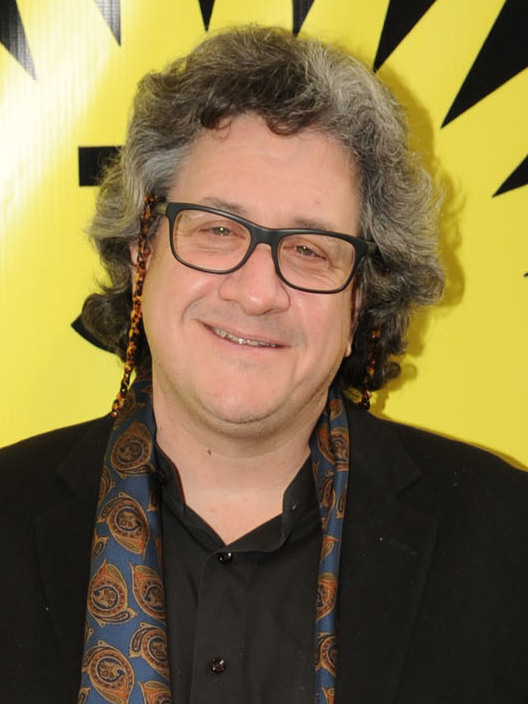
- De Felitta at the 2014 Miami International Film Festival
- Born: June 30, 1964 (age 62); New York City, New York, U.S.
- Other names: Raymond DeFelitta; Ray DeFelitta; Raymond de Fellita
- Education: Bard College (BA); American Film Institute (MFA)
- Occupations: Film director, screenwriter, musician
- Years active: 1986–present
- Spouse: Sherry Brennan (m. 2001)
- Website: Official website

Raymond De Felitta (born June 30, 1964) is an American independent film director, screenwriter, musician, blogger and podcaster.

== Early life ==
De Felitta was born in New York City. His father Frank De Felitta was Italian-American and his mother Dorothy Gilbert De Felitta was of Polish-Jewish descent. De Felitta graduated from Bard College in 1985 and the American Film Institute's directing program, class of 1990.

== Career ==
The next year, he was nominated for an Academy Award for Best Live Action Short Film at the 63rd Academy Awards for his AFI thesis short, Bronx Cheers. Later in 1991, he was awarded a Nicholl Fellowship in Screenwriting for his screenplay "Begin The Beguine". In 1995 he wrote and directed Cafe Society starring Frank Whaley, Peter Gallagher and Lara Flynn Boyle. The film premiered in Director' Fortnight (Quinzaine des Réalisateurs) section of the 1995 Cannes Film Festival and was shown on the Showtime Network in 1996. It was released theatrically in 1997. In 2000 De Felitta directed the indie film Two Family House which won the Audience Award at the Sundance Film Festival along with an Independent Spirit Award nomination for Best Screenplay. In 2003 he directed Paul Reiser's The Thing About My Folks which received the Audience Award at the Santa Barbara International Film Festival. The film was released in 2005 by Picture House. In 2006 De Felitta directed his first documentary 'Tis Autumn: The Search for Jackie Paris, which won the Best Jazz Documentary at the Kansas City Filmmakers Jubilee. The film was released in 2007 by Outsider Pictures.

In 2009, De Felitta wrote and directed the independent film City Island, which received the First Place Audience Award at the Tribeca Film Festival. The film opened in theaters 19 March 2010 and had a long theatrical run.

In 2012, De Felitta directed Booker's Place: A Mississippi Story. The documentary was inspired by a previous documentary that De Felitta's father, Frank De Felitta, made for NBC News in 1966 titled "Mississippi: A Self Portrait". The earlier film contained a frank and shocking interview with an African-American waiter, Booker Wright, who told the cameras what it was like working in a whites-only restaurant in the south. The resulting fallout for the waiter and his family was the subject of the second documentary. "Booker's Place: A Mississippi Story" was the subject of a full one-hour episode of "Dateline NBC".

In 2014, De Felitta directed Rob the Mob, which starred Michael Pitt, Nina Arianda, Andy Garcia and Ray Romano. It marked De Felitta's second collaboration with Garcia, who had starred in and co-produced "City Island".

In 2016, De Felitta directed Madoff, a four-hour mini-series for ABC television based on the rise and fall of the notorious financier Bernard L. Madoff. The film starred Richard Dreyfuss and Blythe Danner. De Felitta was nominated for a Directors Guild of America Award for Outstanding Directorial Achievement in Movies for Television and Mini-Series.

In 2018, De Felitta directed the baseball-themed drama Bottom of the 9th, starring Sofia Vergara and Joe Manganiello

== 'Movies Til Dawn' Blog and Podcast ==
De Felitta's long running daily blog "Movies Til Dawn", hosted on his official site, features YouTube clips and discussions of subjects that include film, urban history, music, dance and vintage television. His podcast of the same name "Movies 'Til Dawn" features conversations with fellow filmmakers. Guests have included Peter Bogdanovich, John Sayles, Mary Harron, Harold Becker, Griffin Dunne, Andy Garcia, Mel Brooks and others.

== Theater ==
De Felitta wrote the libretto for "Buddy's Tavern", a musical version of his film "Two Family House". The musical won the prestigious Richard Rodgers Award which is given annually through the American Academy of Arts and Letters. It 2010 it received a production at the Eugene O'Neill Theater Center's Summer Musical Workshop. Later that year it had a limited run at the Hudson Guild Theater in New York City. In 2012 it received a workshop production at The York Theater Company, in New York City.

== Music career ==
De Felitta is a lifelong jazz pianist. In 1994, he self-produced his first CD, Movies 'til Dawn. His second CD was a piano/vocal collaboration with Peter Bogdanovich titled Monday Morning Quarterbacks. His third CD, Fatha Land, was produced in 2007. This album is a tribute to Earl Hines. His fourth CD, Pre-War Charm, featuring his jazz trio was released in late 2017.

== Personal life ==
De Felitta has been married to Sherry Brennan since 2001 and has one son, Lorenzo De Felitta.

== Filmography ==
Filmography
Year	Title	Director	Writer	Producer	Notes
1990	Bronx Cheers	Yes	Yes	Yes	
1995	Cafe Society	Yes	Yes	No	
2000	Two Family House	Yes	Yes	No	
2005	The Thing About My Folks	Yes	No	No	
2006	'Tis Autumn: The Search for Jackie Paris	Yes	Yes	Yes	
2009	City Island	Yes	Yes	Yes	
2012	Booker's Place: A Mississippi Story	Yes	No	No	
2014	Rob the Mob	Yes	No	Yes	
2016	Madoff	Yes	No	No	
2019	Bottom of the 9th	Yes	No	No	

== Accolades ==
Accolades
Year	Award	Category	Title	Result	Ref
1991	Academy Awards	Best Live-Action Short Film	Bronx Cheers	Nominated	
1990	Nicholl Fellowship	Screenwriting	Begin the Beguine	Won	
1995	Cannes Film Festival	Caméra d'Or	Cafe Society	Nominated	
2000	Sundance Film Festival	Audience Award Dramatic	Two Family House	Won	
2000	Independent Spirit Awards	Best Screenplay	Two Family House	Nominated	
2003	Santa Barbara International Film Festival	Audience Award	The Thing About My Folks	Won	
2007	Kansas City Jubilee Festival	Best Jazz Documentary	'Tis Autumn; The Search for Jackie Paris	Won	
2010	Tribeca Film Festival	Audience Award	City Island	Won	
2016	Directors Guild of America	Best Director of a Limited Series	Madoff	Nominated	
