= Sheila Amos =

American film editor

- Born: July 27, 1946; United States
- Died: July 11, 2010 (aged 63); New York City, New York, U.S.
- Occupation: Film editor

Sheila Amos (July 27, 1946 – July 11, 2010) was an American film editor notable for her work on the shows Cheers and Frasier, and on the film The Thing About My Folks. Amos was nominated for two Primetime Emmys during her career.

== Death ==
Amos died on July 11, 2010, in New York City from leukaemia at the age of 63.

== Filmography ==
- The Thing About My Folks (2005)
