= Genevievette Walker-Lightfoot =

American lawyer

- Born: Genevievette E. Walker; Miami, Florida, U.S.
- Education: Georgetown University (BA); Catholic University of America (JD); Robert H. Smith School of Business (MBA)
- Occupation: Attorney
- Years active: 14
- Employers: Law Offices of Genevievette E. Walker-Lightfoot, P.C. (2012-Present); Federal Reserve Board of Governors (2006–2012); Securities and Exchange Commission (2001–06); American Stock Exchange (1999–2001); NASD (1999)
- Awards: SEC Chairman's Award for Excellence 2004; SEC Capital Markets Award 2003; Securities Law Moot Court Competition 1st Place Best Brief, 2nd Place Best Overall, 3rd Place Oral Arguments
- Website: gewllaw.com

Genevievette Walker-Lightfoot is a former U.S. Securities and Exchange Commission (SEC) attorney. She worked on the Bernard Madoff investigation in 2004, as the Lead Investigator for the SEC on the case. She discovered key elements of the Madoff Ponzi scheme and reported them to her superiors. She was moved off the case prior to being able to complete the investigation.

== Education ==
Genevievette E. Walker graduated from Walt Whitman High School in Huntington, New York, received her B.A. from Georgetown University, and attended the Catholic University of America (J.D., 1999).

== American Stock Exchange ==
Walker-Lightfoot worked at the American Stock Exchange from 1999–2001 as a staff lawyer.

== Madoff investment scandal ==
Walker-Lightfoot worked at the SEC from 2001–06. While a lawyer in the SEC's Office of Compliance, Inspections and Examinations, she was tasked in 2003–04 with conducting the SEC’s investigation into a complaint about the activities of now-convicted Ponzi-schemer Bernard Madoff and his firm. Her work revealed troubling questions.

In March 2004 she informed her supervisor, Branch Chief Mark Donohue, and his boss, Assistant Director Eric Swanson, that she was concerned because her review of Bernard Madoff found numerous inconsistencies, and that she recommended further follow-up questioning. However, in April 2004 she was told by Donohue and Swanson that because of pressure to investigate the mutual fund industry, she was to focus on that investigation instead, conclude work on the probe, and to give all of her documentation from the Madoff investigation to a co-worker.

After the investigation concluded, Swanson married Shana Madoff, a niece of Bernie Madoff and the in-house compliance attorney at Madoff's firm. A spokesman for Swanson, who has left the SEC, said Swanson "did not participate in any inquiry of Bernard Madoff Securities or its affiliates while involved in a relationship" with Shana Madoff.

Walker-Lightfoot sent emails to her supervisor saying information provided by Madoff during her review didn't add up, and sent up a set of questions to ask Madoff's firm, according to a report in The Washington Post. It is alleged that several of the questions alleged to have been raised directly challenged Madoff activities that turned out to be elements of his massive fraud, the newspaper said, however the SEC Inspector General’s report on the Madoff scandal notes that she was “the only person involved in the [SEC’s] Madoff examination to refuse to testify” to the OIG and it was therefore “difficult to assess her credibility” in making such claims. Madoff was sentenced to a prison term of 150 years on June 29, 2009, after he pleaded guilty to a decades-long fraud that U.S. prosecutors said drew in as much as $65 billion.

The Washington Post reported that when Walker-Lightfoot reviewed the paper documents and electronic data supplied to the SEC by Madoff, she found it full of inconsistencies, according to documents, a former SEC official, and another person knowledgeable about the 2004 investigation.

Swanson, no longer with the agency, declined to comment, the Post said. SEC spokesman John Nester also declined to comment, citing the ongoing investigation by the agency's Inspector General, Reuters reported.

Walker-Lightfoot left the SEC in January 2006, after having received a judgment in her favor against the SEC in a hostile work environment case. Walker-Lightfoot did not experience a break in Federal service, as she immediately went to work at the Federal Reserve Board of Governors, where she worked as a specialist in risk management and large financial institutions until October 2011.

On November 16, 2009, Walker-Lightfoot was sworn into the Supreme Court of the United States bar.

== SEC leadership changes ==
Leaders of the SEC testified on February 4, 2009, before the United States House Committee on Financial Services subcommittee including Linda Chatman Thomsen (SEC enforcement director), acting General Counsel Andy Vollmer, Andrew Donohue, Erik Sirri, and Lori Richards (SEC Director of compliance inspections and examinations; Walker-Lightfoot's Senior Department Head)), and Stephen Luparello of the Financial Industry Regulatory Authority (FINRA).

The subject of the hearings was why the SEC had failed to act when Harry Markopolos, a private fraud investigator, alerted the SEC detailing his persistent and unsuccessful efforts to get the SEC to investigate Madoff, beginning in 1999.

Richards ultimately testified that her department failed to find Madoff due to having to "match available staff resources to the most pressing needs". She restated the same cause for missing the Madoff Ponzi scheme June 17, 2009, in a speech at the Securities Industry and Financial Markets Association's Compliance and Legal Division St. Louis Regional Seminar.

On July 9, six days after the Washington Post article concerning Walker-Lightfoot's involvement in the Madoff investigation was published, The Post announced that Richards would resign from the SEC in order to "take on new challenges."
