= Martin London =

American litigation attorney

- Occupation: Litigation attorney
- Known for: Representing former US Vice President Spiro Agnew

Martin "Marty" London is an American litigation attorney who is best known for representing former US Vice President Spiro Agnew. He was a partner at New York law firm Paul, Weiss, Rifkind, Wharton & Garrison LLP and has been litigation of counsel at the firm since his retirement in 2005. London has published articles in Time Magazine, the HuffPost and The New York Times.

== Early life and education ==
London grew up in Crown Heights, Brooklyn, where his father owned a coin-operated self-service laundromat. Following his graduation from Cornell University in 1955, he went on to attend NYU School of Law and graduated cum laude in 1957. He was a member of the NYU Law Review.

== Career ==
London worked at law firm Paul, Weiss, Rifkind, Wharton & Garrison LLP for 45 years until his retirement in 2005. He was the firm's chairman from 1990 to 1992.

In 1971, London represented former First Lady Jacqueline Kennedy Onassis in a harassment lawsuit against the paparazzo Ron Galella, which resulted in Kennedy Onassis obtaining a restraining order against the photographer and highlighting the issue of paparazzi. Other clients include tobacco corporation Brown & Williamson, financial corporation Citigroup and non-profit organization Planned Parenthood Columbia Willamette, with the latter represented pro bono. In the mid-1980s, London represented the lawyers defending several of Donald Trump's tenants in a separate case, who Trump then sued in an attempt "to crush the tenants by crippling their lawyers."

London was actively involved in the disbarment for unethical conduct in 1986 of Roy Cohn, former chief counsel for Senator Joseph McCarthy and Donald Trump's mentor and personal lawyer. In 2018, London called on President Donald Trump to resign.

His memoir, The Client Decides: A Litigator's Life: Jackie Onassis, Vice President Spiro Agnew, Donald Trump, Roy Cohn, and more, was published in 2017.

London contributed to Rachel Maddow's 2018 podcast Bag Man about the criminal investigation into former vice president Spiro Agnew on suspicion of criminal conspiracy, bribery, extortion and tax fraud in 1973. According to evidence presented by the then United States Attorney for the District of Maryland, George Beall, Agnew had "sought and received cash payments of more than $100,000 while in elective office" over a period of eight years. Agnew resigned in exchange for the charges being reduced to tax evasion. On the podcast, London recalls the events from his point of view as Agnew's lawyer at the time.

== Personal life ==
London married his first wife, Mellanie R. Bell, in 1958. They had two children, Jesse (*1960) and Lizbeth (*1965), and were divorced in 1974. London's second wife, Doris "Pinks" Wilke London, is a retired private tutor for children with learning disabilities. She has two children from a previous relationship, including her daughter Stephanie Mack, who was married to Bernie Madoff's son Mark until his death by suicide in 2010. It was London who discovered the body of his son-in-law in the couple's apartment.

== Publications ==
- The Client Decides: A Litigator's Life: Jackie Onassis, Vice President Spiro Agnew, Donald Trump, Roy Cohn, and more (2017)
