= Ruth Madoff =

Widow of Bernie Madoff (born 1941)

- Born: Ruth Alpern; May 18, 1941 (age 85); New York City, New York, U.S.
- Education: New York University; Queens College
- Occupation: Bookkeeper
- Employer: Bernard L. Madoff Investment Securities
- Spouse: Bernie Madoff (m. 1959; died 2021)
- Children: Mark Madoff; Andrew Madoff

Ruth Madoff (/ˈmeɪdɔːf/ MAY-doff; née Alpern; born May 18, 1941) is an American former bookkeeper and the widow of Bernie Madoff, the convicted American financial fraudster who served a prison sentence for a criminal financial scheme until his death in April 2021.

After her husband's arrest for his fraud, she and her husband attempted suicide in 2008. While she had $70 million in assets in her name, after her husband was imprisoned she was stripped of all of her money other than $2.5 million by the government, and by the trustee for her husband's firm, Irving Picard.

== Early life ==
Madoff was born in Queens, New York, to Saul (an accountant who died in 1999, at age 95) and Sara (Presser) Alpern (died in 1996, at age 92), and raised in middle class Laurelton, Queens, in a practicing Jewish family. She has one sister, Joan Roman. A graduate of Far Rockaway High School and a 1961 graduate of Queens College with a degree in Psychology, she graduated from New York University with a Master of Science degree in nutrition in 1992.

== Personal life ==
On November 28, 1959, at age 18, she married Bernie Madoff, whom she had met while attending Far Rockaway High School. He was three years older than Ruth.

They had two sons, Mark (1964–2010), a 1986 graduate of the University of Michigan; and Andrew (1966–2014), a 1988 graduate of University of Pennsylvania's Wharton School. Both of her sons predeceased her: Mark, by suicide, in 2010, and Andrew, from lymphoma, in 2014. On the morning of December 11, 2010—exactly two years after his father's arrest—Mark was found dead in his New York City apartment. The city medical examiner ruled the cause of death as suicide by hanging.

She worked for some time as her husband's bookkeeper. A Vanity Fair article stated that, during the time when she was a bookkeeper, employees in the London office stated "Ruthie runs all the books". She was a director of Bernard L. Madoff Investment Securities.

Ruth stated during an interview that she and her husband were so upset after his financial fraud was exposed that they had attempted suicide together, with both taking "a bunch of pills" (Ambien, and perhaps Klonopin) in a suicide pact on Christmas Eve 2008, just after her husband had been arrested by federal authorities. However, they woke up the following day.

When Ruth Madoff's husband was sentenced in 2009, victim Marcia FitzMaurice said in a court statement: "Your wife, rightfully so, has been vilified and shunned by her friends in the community." After her husband was sent to prison, Ruth Madoff sought to avoid being recognized in public, even dyeing her hair red.

== Assets ==
According to a March 13, 2009, filing by Madoff, he and his wife were worth up to $138 million, plus an estimated $700 million for the value of his business interest in Bernard L. Madoff Investment Securities LLC. Other major assets included securities ($45 million), cash ($17 million), half-interest in BLM Air Charter ($12 million), a 2006 Leopard yacht ($7 million), jewelry ($2.6 million), a Manhattan apartment ($7 million), a Montauk home ($3 million), a Palm Beach home ($11 million), a Cap d'Antibes, France, property ($1 million), furniture, household goods, and art ($9.9 million), and a restored 1969 Rybovich sportfishing yacht ($800,000).

Following her husband's incarceration, most of the Madoff family assets were seized by the government, including the couple's Upper East Side penthouse in New York City.

In June 2009, shortly before Bernie Madoff was sentenced, prosecutors reached an agreement allowing Ruth Madoff to keep $2.5 million, while taking and selling the Madoffs' other assets. The settlement, however, did not preclude others, such as the court-appointed trustee Irving Picard of BakerHostetler who was liquidating her husband's firm, from seeking to recover funds from her, for example as a wrongful transferee of funds transferred to her. Bernie Madoff's lawyer had asked the government to allow his wife to keep $70 million in assets that were in her name, as he forfeited all rights to assets totaling $170 million.

In May 2019, 77-year-old Ruth Madoff agreed to pay $594,000 ($250,000 in cash, and $344,000 of trusts for two of her grandchildren), and to surrender her remaining assets when she dies, to settle claims by the court-appointed trustee Picard liquidating her husband's firm for former customers. Picard had sued Ruth Madoff for $44.8 million, saying she had lived a "life of splendor" on the gains from the fraud committed by her husband, but settled for less, given her limited assets. Picard said that the settlement was not evidence she knew of or participated in the fraud. She is required to provide reports to Picard about her expenditures often, as to any purchase over $100, to ensure she does not have any hidden bank accounts.

== Homes ==
In 2012, Ruth Madoff moved to one of her son Andrew's houses in Old Greenwich, Connecticut, after spending two years living in Boca Raton, Florida, with her sister. Following Andrew's death in 2014, Ruth moved to a nondescript condo-complex in Old Greenwich, living in a one-bedroom apartment. Since September 2020 she has resided with Susan Elkin, her former daughter-in-law from Mark Madoff's first marriage, in a $4.4 million beachfront property in Old Greenwich.

== In the media ==
- Jill Eikenberry played a Madoff-inspired character, "Irene Matson", in the 2009 Law & Order episode "Anchors Away".
- Cate Blanchett used Madoff as inspiration for her Oscar-winning performance in the 2013 film Blue Jasmine.
- Blythe Danner portrayed her in the 2016 ABC miniseries Madoff.
- Michelle Pfeiffer played her in the 2017 HBO film The Wizard of Lies, which is based on Diana B. Henriques's best-selling book.
- Bernadette Peters played a Madoff-inspired character, "Lenore Rindell" on the television series The Good Fight.
- Emily Swain impersonated her in Ruthless – The Tragic Suvival of Ruth Madoff. This stage production by Roger Steinmann had its world-premiere in London on June 3, 2025.
