= Bernie Madoff =

American financier and con artist (1938–2021)

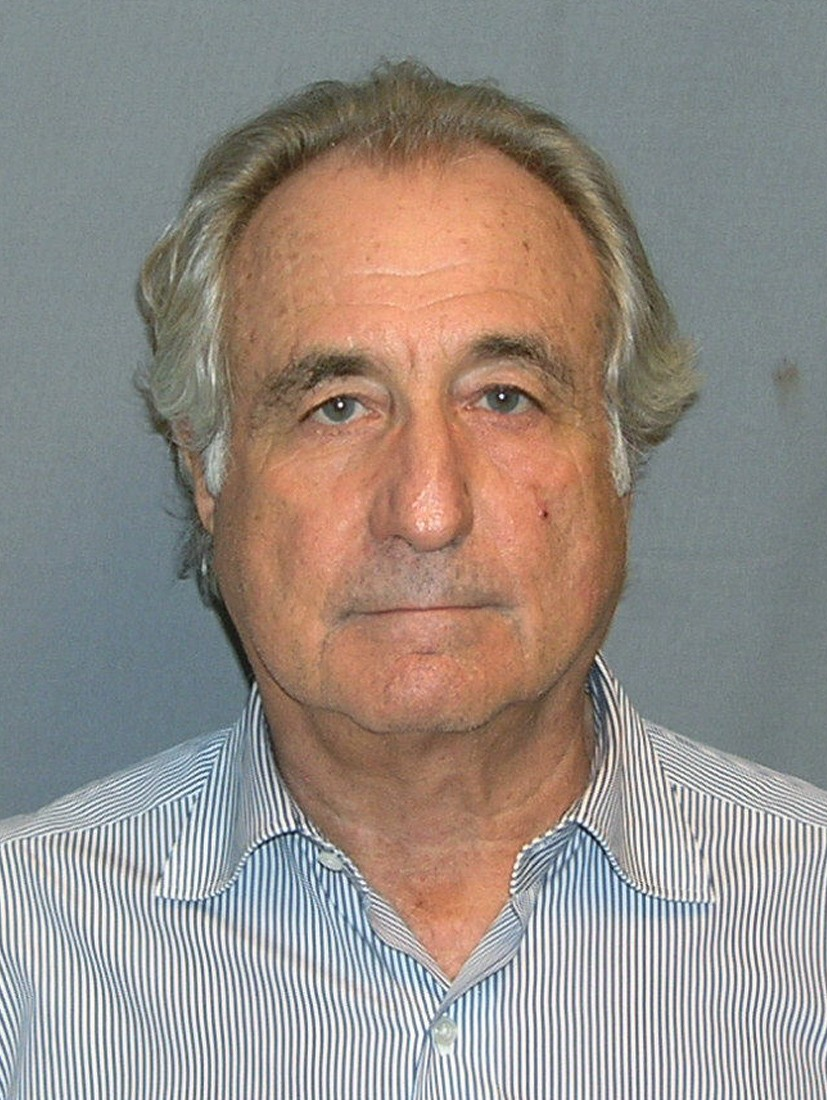
- Mug shot of Madoff in 2009
- Born: Bernard Lawrence Madoff; April 29, 1938; Brooklyn, New York City, U.S.
- Died: April 14, 2021 (aged 82); Butner, North Carolina, U.S.
- Resting place: Cremated; location of ashes private
- Education: Hofstra University (BA); Brooklyn Law School (withdrew)
- Occupations: Stockbroker; investment advisor; financier
- Employer(s): Bernard L. Madoff Investment Securities (founder); Nasdaq (chairman)
- Known for: Madoff investment scandal
- Spouse: Ruth Madoff (m. 1959)
- Children: Mark; Andrew
- Relatives: Shana Madoff (niece)
- Status: Deceased; formerly incarcerated at Federal Correctional Complex, Butner
- Convictions: Securities fraud; Investment advisor trust fraud; Mail fraud; Wire fraud; Money laundering (3 counts); Making false statements; Perjury; Making false filings with the SEC; Theft from an employee benefit plan
- Penalty: 150 years in federal prison; Forfeiture of US$17.179 billion; Lifetime ban from securities industry

Details
- Span of crimes: 1991–2008
- Date apprehended: December 11, 2008

Bernard Lawrence Madoff (/ˈmeɪdɔːf/; April 29, 1938 – April 14, 2021) was an American financier, stock broker, and con artist who was the admitted mastermind of the largest-known Ponzi scheme in history, worth an estimated $65 billion. He was at one time chairman of the Nasdaq stock exchange. Madoff's firm had two basic units: a stock brokerage and an asset management business; the Ponzi scheme was centered in the asset management business.

Born in Brooklyn and raised in Laurelton, Madoff graduated from Hofstra University, and founded a penny stock brokerage in 1960, which eventually grew into Bernard L. Madoff Investment Securities. He was the company's chairman until his arrest on December 11, 2008. That year, the firm was the sixth-largest market maker in S&P 500 stocks. While the stock brokerage part of the business had a public profile, Madoff tried to keep his asset management business low profile and exclusive. At the firm, he employed his brother Peter as senior managing director and chief compliance officer, Peter's daughter Shana as the firm's rules and compliance officer and attorney, and his sons Mark and Andrew Madoff.

On December 10, 2008, Madoff's sons Mark and Andrew told authorities that their father had confessed to them that the asset management unit of his firm was a massive Ponzi scheme, and quoted him as saying that it was "one big lie". The following day, agents from the Federal Bureau of Investigation arrested Madoff and charged him with one count of securities fraud. The U.S. Securities and Exchange Commission (SEC) had previously conducted multiple investigations into his business practices but had not uncovered the massive fraud. On March 12, 2009, Madoff pleaded guilty to 11 federal felonies and admitted to turning his wealth management business into a massive Ponzi scheme.

The Madoff investment scandal defrauded thousands of investors of billions of dollars. Madoff said that he began the Ponzi scheme in the early 1990s, but an ex-trader admitted in court to faking records for Madoff since the early 1970s. Those charged with recovering the missing money believe that the investment operation may never have been legitimate. The amount missing from client accounts was almost $65 billion, including fabricated gains. The Securities Investor Protection Corporation (SIPC) trustee estimated actual direct losses to investors of $18 billion, of which $14.829 billion has been recovered and returned, while the search for additional funds continues. On June 29, 2009, Madoff was sentenced to 150 years in prison, the maximum sentence allowed. His son Mark hanged himself in 2010, exactly two years after his father's arrest, Peter was sentenced to 10 years in prison in 2012, and Andrew died of lymphoma on September 3, 2014. On April 14, 2021, Madoff died at the Federal Medical Center, Butner, in North Carolina, from chronic kidney disease.

== Early life and education ==
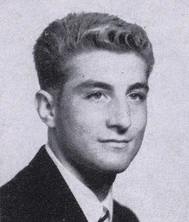
Madoff in his 1956 high school yearbook

Madoff was born on April 29, 1938, in Brooklyn, New York City, to Ralph Madoff, a plumber and stockbroker, and wife, Sylvia Madoff (née Muntner). Madoff's grandparents were Jewish emigrants from Poland, Romania, and Austria. He was the second of three children; his siblings are Sondra Weiner and Peter Madoff. His family later moved to Queens, and Madoff graduated from Far Rockaway High School in 1956. Friends from his youth described him as a thin, outgoing boy who participated in community center activities and ate ice cream at the local five-and-ten.

Madoff attended the University of Alabama for one year, where he became a brother of the Tau chapter of the Sigma Alpha Mu fraternity, then transferred to and graduated from Hofstra University in 1960 with a Bachelor of Arts in political science. Madoff briefly attended Brooklyn Law School, but left after his first year, using money he had saved working as a lifeguard and running an irrigation sprinkler business to start Bernard L. Madoff Investment Securities LLC.

== Career ==
In 1960, Madoff founded Bernard L. Madoff Investment Securities LLC as a broker-dealer for penny stock with $5,000 (equivalent to $54,000 in 2025) that he earned from working as a lifeguard and irrigation sprinkler installer and a loan of $50,000 from his father-in-law, accountant Saul Alpern, who referred a circle of friends and their families; Carl J. Shapiro was one such early customer, investing $100,000.

Initially, the firm made markets (quoted bid and ask prices) via the National Quotation Bureau's Pink Sheets. In order to compete with firms that were members of the New York Stock Exchange trading on the stock exchange's floor, his firm began using innovative computer information technology to disseminate its quotes. After a trial run, the technology that the firm helped to develop became the National Association of Securities Dealers Automated Quotations Stock Market (Nasdaq). After 41 years as a sole proprietorship, the Madoff firm incorporated in 2001 as a limited liability company with Madoff as the sole shareholder.

The firm functioned as a third market trading provider, bypassing exchange specialist firms by directly executing orders over the counter from retail brokers. At one point, Madoff Securities was the largest market maker at the Nasdaq, and, in 2008, was the sixth-largest market maker in S&P 500 stocks. The firm also had an investment management and advisory division, which it did not publicize, that was the focus of the fraud investigation.

Madoff was "the first prominent practitioner" of payment for order flow, in which a dealer pays a broker for the right to execute a customer's order. This has been called a "legal kickback". Some academics have questioned the ethics of these payments. Madoff argued that these payments did not alter the price that the customer received. He viewed the payments as a normal business practice:

If your girlfriend goes to buy stockings at a supermarket, the racks that display those stockings are usually paid for by the company that manufactured the stockings. Order flow was an issue that attracted a lot of attention but was grossly overrated.

Madoff was active with the National Association of Securities Dealers (NASD), a self-regulatory securities-industry organization. He was chairman of its board of directors, and a member of its board of governors.

=== Philanthropy and other activities ===
Madoff was a philanthropist, who was on boards of nonprofit institutions, many of which entrusted his firm with their endowments. The collapse and freeze of his personal assets and those of his firm affected businesses, charities, and foundations around the world, including the Chais Family Foundation, the Robert I. Lappin Charitable Foundation, the Picower Foundation, and the JEHT Foundation which were forced to close. Madoff donated approximately $6 million to lymphoma research after his son Andrew was diagnosed with the disease. He and his wife gave over $230,000 to political causes since 1991, with the bulk going to the Democratic Party.

Madoff was the chairman of the Sy Syms School of Business at Yeshiva University, and treasurer of its board of trustees. He resigned his position at Yeshiva University after his arrest. Madoff also was on the board of New York City Center, a member of New York City's Cultural Institutions Group (CIG). He was on the executive council of the Wall Street division of the UJA Foundation of New York which declined to invest funds with him because of the conflict of interest.

Madoff undertook charity work for the Gift of Life Bone Marrow Foundation and made philanthropic gifts through the Madoff Family Foundation, a $19 million private foundation, which he managed along with his wife. They also donated money to hospitals and theaters. The foundation contributed to many educational, cultural, and health charities, including those later forced to close because of Madoff's fraud. After Madoff's arrest, the assets of the Madoff Family Foundation were frozen by a federal court.

=== Government access ===
From 1991 to 2008, Bernie and Ruth Madoff contributed about $240,000 to federal candidates, parties, and committees, including $25,000 a year from 2005 through 2008 to the Democratic Senatorial Campaign Committee. The committee returned $100,000 of the Madoffs' contributions to Irving Picard, the bankruptcy trustee who oversees all claims, and Senator Chuck Schumer returned almost $30,000 received from Madoff and his relatives to the trustee. Senator Chris Dodd donated $1,500 to the Elie Wiesel Foundation for Humanity, a Madoff victim.

Members of the Madoff family have been leaders of the Securities Industry and Financial Markets Association (SIFMA), the primary securities industry organization. Bernard Madoff was on the board of directors of the Securities Industry Association, a precursor of SIFMA, and was chairman of its trading committee. He was a founding board member of the Depository Trust & Clearing Corporation (DTCC) subsidiary in London, the International Securities Clearing Corporation.

Madoff's brother Peter did two terms as a member of SIFMA's board of directors. He and Andrew received awards from SIFMA in 2008 for "extraordinary leadership and service". He resigned from the board of directors of SIFMA in December 2008, as news of the Ponzi scheme broke. From 2000 to 2008, the Madoff brothers donated $56,000 directly to SIFMA, and paid additional money as sponsors of industry meetings. Bernard Madoff's niece Shana Madoff was a member of the executive committee of SIFMA's Compliance & Legal Division, but resigned shortly after the arrest.

Madoff's name first came up in a fraud investigation in 1992, when two people complained to the SEC about investments they made with Avellino & Bienes, the successor to his father-in-law's accounting practice. For years, Alpern and two of his colleagues, Frank Avellino and Michael Bienes, had raised money for Madoff, a practice that continued after Avellino and Bienes took over the firm in the 1970s. Avellino returned the money to investors and the SEC closed the case.

In 2004, Genevievette Walker-Lightfoot, a lawyer in the SEC's Office of Compliance Inspections and Examinations (OCIE), informed her supervisor branch chief Mark Donohue that her review of Madoff found numerous inconsistencies, and recommended further questioning. However, she was told by Donohue and his boss Eric Swanson to stop work on the Madoff investigation, send them her work results, and instead investigate the mutual fund industry. Swanson, assistant director of the SEC's OCIE, had met Shana Madoff in 2003 while investigating her uncle Bernie Madoff and his firm. The investigation was concluded in 2005. In 2006, Swanson left the SEC and became engaged to Shana Madoff, and in 2007 the two married. A spokesman for Swanson said he "did not participate in any inquiry of Bernard Madoff Securities or its affiliates while involved in a relationship" with Shana Madoff.

While awaiting sentencing, Madoff met with the SEC's inspector general, H. David Kotz, who conducted an investigation into how regulators had failed to detect the fraud despite numerous red flags. Madoff said he could have been caught in 2003, but that bumbling investigators had acted like "Lt. Columbo" and never asked the right questions. He said "They never even looked at my stock records," and that it "would've been easy for them to see" if they'd checked with the Depository Trust Company; "if you're looking at a Ponzi scheme, it's the first thing you do."

Madoff said in the June 17, 2009, interview that SEC Chairman Mary Schapiro was a "dear friend", and SEC Commissioner Elisse Walter was a "terrific lady" whom he knew "pretty well". After Madoff's arrest, the SEC was criticized for its lack of financial expertise and lack of due diligence, despite having received complaints from Harry Markopolos and others for almost a decade. The SEC's inspector general, Kotz, found that since 1992, there had been six investigations of Madoff by the SEC, which were botched either through incompetent staff work or by neglecting allegations of financial experts and whistle-blowers. At least some of the SEC investigators doubted whether Madoff was even trading.

Due to concerns of improper conduct by Inspector General Kotz in the Madoff investigation, Inspector General David C. Williams of the United States Postal Service was brought in to conduct an independent outside review. The Williams Report questioned Kotz's work on the Madoff investigation, because Kotz was a "very good friend" of Markopolos. Investigators were not able to determine when Kotz and Markopolos became friends. A violation of the ethics rule would have taken place if the friendship were concurrent with Kotz's investigation of Madoff.

== Investment scandal ==
In 1999, financial analyst Harry Markopolos had informed the SEC that he believed it was legally and mathematically impossible to achieve the gains Madoff claimed to deliver. According to Markopolos, it took him four minutes to conclude that Madoff's numbers did not add up, and another minute to suspect they were fraudulent. After four hours of failed attempts to replicate Madoff's numbers, Markopolos believed he had mathematically proven Madoff was a fraud. He was ignored by the SEC's Boston office in 2000 and 2001, as well as by Meaghan Cheung at the SEC's New York office in 2005 and 2007 when he presented further evidence. He has since co-authored a book with Gaytri D. Kachroo, the leader of his legal team, titled No One Would Listen. The book details the frustrating efforts he and his legal team made over a ten-year period to alert the government, the industry, and the press about Madoff's fraud.

Although Madoff's wealth management business ultimately grew into a multibillion-dollar operation, none of the major derivatives firms traded with him because they did not believe his numbers were real. None of the major Wall Street firms invested with him, and several high-ranking executives at those firms suspected his operations and claims were not legitimate. Others contended it was inconceivable that the growing volume of Madoff's accounts could be competently and legitimately serviced by his documented accounting/auditing firm, a three-person firm with only one active accountant. The Central Bank of Ireland failed to spot Madoff's gigantic fraud when he started using Irish funds and had to supply large amounts of information, which would have been enough to enable Irish regulators to uncover the fraud much earlier than late 2008 when he was finally arrested in New York.

The Federal Bureau of Investigation report and federal prosecutors' complaint says that during the first week of December 2008, Madoff confided to a senior employee, identified by Bloomberg News as one of his sons, that he was struggling to meet $7 billion in redemptions. For years, Madoff had simply deposited investors' money in his business account at JPMorgan Chase and withdrew money from that account when they requested redemptions. He had scraped together just enough money to make a redemption payment on November 19. However, despite cash infusions from several longtime investors, by the week after Thanksgiving it was apparent that there was not enough money to begin to meet the remaining requests. His Chase account had over $5.5 billion in mid-2008, but by late November was down to $234 million, a fraction of the outstanding redemptions. With banks all having stopped lending, Madoff was unable to borrow the money he required. On December 3, he apprised longtime assistant Frank DiPascali, who had overseen the fraudulent advisory business, on the situation. On December 9, he confided in his brother Peter about the fraud.

According to the sons, Bernie Madoff told Mark Madoff on the following day, December 9, that he planned to pay out $173 million in bonuses two months early. Madoff said that "he had recently made profits through business operations, and that now was a good time to distribute it." Mark told Andrew Madoff, and the next morning they went to their father's office and asked him how he could pay bonuses to his staff if he was having trouble paying clients. They then traveled to Madoff's apartment, where with Ruth Madoff nearby, Madoff told them he was "finished", that he had "absolutely nothing" left, and that his investment fund was "just one big lie" and "basically, a giant Ponzi scheme."

According to their attorney, Madoff's sons then reported their father to federal authorities. Madoff had intended to wind up his operations over the remainder of the week before having his sons turn him in; he directed DiPascali to use the remaining money in his business account to cash out the accounts of several family members and favored friends. However, as soon as they left their father's apartment, Mark and Andrew immediately contacted a lawyer, who in turn got them in touch with federal prosecutors and the SEC. On December 11, 2008, Madoff was arrested and charged with securities fraud.

Madoff posted $10 million bail in December 2008 and remained under 24-hour monitoring and house arrest in his Upper East Side penthouse apartment until his guilty plea on March 12, 2009. On that date, Judge Denny Chin revoked his bail and remanded him to the Metropolitan Correctional Center pending sentencing. Chin ruled that Madoff was a flight risk because of his age, his wealth, and the prospect of spending the rest of his life in prison. Prosecutors filed two asset forfeiture pleadings which include lists of valuable real and personal property as well as financial interests and entities owned or controlled by Madoff.

Madoff's lawyer, Ira Sorkin, filed an appeal, which prosecutors opposed. On March 20, 2009, an appellate court denied Madoff's request to be released from jail and returned to home confinement until his sentencing on June 29, 2009. On June 22, 2009, Sorkin hand-delivered a customary pre-sentencing letter to the judge requesting a sentence of 12 years, because of tables from the Social Security Administration that his life span was predicted to be 13 years.

On June 26, 2009, Chin ordered forfeiture of $170 million in Madoff's assets. Prosecutors asked Chin to sentence Madoff to 150 years in prison. Bankruptcy Trustee Irving Picard indicated that "Mr. Madoff has not provided meaningful cooperation or assistance." In settlement with federal prosecutors, Madoff's wife Ruth agreed to forfeit her claim to $85 million in assets, leaving her with $2.5 million in cash. The order allowed the SEC and Court appointed trustee Irving Picard to pursue Ruth Madoff's funds. Massachusetts regulators also accused her of withdrawing $15 million from company-related accounts shortly before he confessed.

In February 2009, Madoff reached an agreement with the SEC. It was later revealed that as part of the agreement, Madoff accepted a lifetime ban from the securities industry. Picard sued Madoff's sons, Mark and Andrew, his brother Peter, and Peter's daughter, Shana, for negligence and breach of fiduciary duty, for $198 million. The defendants had received over $80 million in compensation since 2001.

=== Mechanics of the fraud ===
According to an SEC indictment, office workers Annette Bongiorno and Joann Crupi created false trading reports based on the returns that Madoff ordered for each customer. For example, when Madoff determined a customer's return, one of the back office workers would enter a false trade report with a previous date and then enter a false closing trade in the amount required to produce the required profit, according to the indictment. Prosecutors allege that Bongiorno used a computer program specially designed to backdate trades and manipulate account statements. They quote her as writing to a manager in the early 1990s, "I need the ability to give any settlement date I want." In some cases, returns were allegedly determined before the account was even opened.

On a daily basis, DiPascali and his team on the 17th floor of the Lipstick Building, where the scam was based (Madoff's brokerage was based on the 19th floor, while the main entrance and conference room were on the 18th floor), watched the closing price of the S&P 100. They then picked the best-performing stocks and used them to create bogus "baskets" of stocks as the basis for false trading records, which Madoff claimed were generated from his supposed "split-strike conversion" strategy, in which he bought blue-chip stocks and took options contracts on them. They frequently made their "trades" at a stock's monthly high or low, resulting in the high "returns" that they touted to customers. On occasion, they slipped up and dated trades as taking place on weekends and federal holidays, though this was never caught.

Over the years, Madoff admonished his investors to keep quiet about their relationship with him. This was because he was well aware of the finite limits that existed for a legitimate split-strike conversion. He knew that if the amount he "managed" became known, investors would question whether he could trade on the scale he claimed without the market reacting to his activity, or whether there were enough options to hedge his stock purchases.

As early as 2001, Harry Markopolos discovered that in order for Madoff's strategy to be possible, he would have had to buy more options on the Chicago Board Options Exchange than actually existed. Additionally, at least one hedge-fund manager, Suzanne Murphy, revealed that she balked at investing with Madoff because she did not believe there was enough volume to support his purported trading activity.

Madoff admitted during his March 2009 guilty plea that the essence of his scheme was to deposit client money into a bank account, rather than invest it and generate steady returns as clients had believed. When clients wanted their money, "I used the money in the Chase Manhattan bank account that belonged to them or other clients to pay the requested funds," he told the court.

Madoff maintained that he began his fraud in the early 1990s, though prosecutors believed it was underway as early as the 1980s. DiPascali, for instance, told prosecutors that he knew at some point in the late 1980s or early 1990s that the investment advisory business was a sham. An investigator charged with reconstructing Madoff's scheme believes that the fraud was well under way as early as 1964. Reportedly, Madoff told an acquaintance soon after his arrest that the fraud began "almost immediately" after his firm opened its doors. Bongiorno, who spent over 40 years with Madoff–longer than anyone except Ruth and Peter–told investigators that she was doing "the same things she was doing in 2008" when she first joined the firm.

=== Affinity fraud ===
Madoff targeted wealthy American Jewish communities, using his in-group status to obtain investments from Jewish individuals and institutions. Affected Jewish charitable organizations considered victims of this affinity fraud include Hadassah, the Women's Zionist Organization of America, the Elie Wiesel Foundation and Steven Spielberg's Wunderkinder Foundation. Jewish federations and hospitals lost millions of dollars, forcing some organizations to close. The Lappin Foundation, for instance, was forced to close temporarily because it had invested its funds with Madoff.

=== Size of loss to investors ===
David Sheehan, chief counsel to trustee Picard, stated on September 27, 2009, that about $36 billion was invested into the scam, returning $18 billion to investors, with $18 billion missing. About half of Madoff's investors were "net winners", earning more than their investment. The withdrawal amounts in the final six years were subject to "clawback" (return of money) lawsuits.

In a May 4, 2011, statement, trustee Picard said that the total amount owed to customers (with some adjustments) was $57 billion, of which $17.3 billion was actually invested by customers. $7.6 billion has been recovered, but pending lawsuits, only $2.6 billion was available to repay victims. The Internal Revenue Service ruled that investors' capital losses in this and other fraudulent investment schemes would be treated as business losses, thereby allowing the victims to claim a tax deduction for such losses.

The size of the fraud was stated as $65 billion early in the investigation. Former SEC Chairman Harvey Pitt estimated the actual net fraud to be between $10 and $17 billion. One difference between the estimates results from different methods of calculation. One method calculates losses as the total amount that victims thought they were owed, but will never receive. The smaller estimates are arrived at by subtracting the total cash received from the scheme from the total cash paid into the scheme, after excluding from the calculation persons accused of collaborating with the scheme, persons who invested through "feeder funds", and anyone who received more cash from the scheme than they paid in. Erin Arvedlund, who publicly questioned Madoff's reported investment performance in 2001, stated that the actual amount of the fraud might never be known, but was likely between $12 and $20 billion.

Jeffry Picower, rather than Madoff, appears to have been the largest beneficiary of Madoff's Ponzi scheme, and his estate settled the claims against it for $7.2 billion. Entities and individuals affiliated with Fred Wilpon and Saul Katz received $300 million in respect of investments in the scheme. Wilpon and Katz "categorically reject[ed]" the charge that they "ignored warning signs" about Madoff's fraud. On November 9, 2017, the U.S. government announced that it would begin paying out $772.5 million from the Madoff Victim Fund to more than 24,000 victims of the Ponzi scheme. The Madoff Recovery Initiative reported $14.418 billion in total recoveries and settlement agreements.

== Arrest and incarceration ==
On March 12, 2009, Madoff pleaded guilty to 11 federal felonies, including securities fraud, wire fraud, mail fraud, money laundering, making false statements, perjury, theft from an employee benefit plan, and making false filings with the SEC. The plea was the response to a criminal complaint filed two days earlier, which stated that over the past 20 years, Madoff had defrauded his clients of almost $65 billion in the largest Ponzi scheme in history. Madoff insisted he was solely responsible for the fraud. He pleaded guilty to all charges without a plea bargain; it has been speculated that he did this instead of cooperating with the authorities in order to avoid naming any associates and co-conspirators in the scheme.

In November 2009, David G. Friehling, Madoff's accounting front man and auditor, pleaded guilty to securities fraud, investment adviser fraud, making false filings to the SEC, and obstructing the Internal Revenue Service. He admitted to merely rubber-stamping Madoff's filings rather than auditing them. Friehling extensively cooperated with federal prosecutors and testified at the trials of five former Madoff employees, all of whom were convicted and sentenced to between 2 and a half and 10 years in prison. Although he could have been sentenced to more than 100 years in prison, because of his cooperation, Friehling was sentenced in May 2015 to one year of home detention and one year of supervised release. His involvement made the Madoff scheme by far the largest accounting fraud in history, dwarfing the $11 billion accounting fraud masterminded by Bernard Ebbers in the WorldCom scandal. Madoff's right-hand man and financial chief, Frank DiPascali, pleaded guilty to 10 federal charges in 2009 and (like Friehling) testified for the government at the trial of five former colleagues, all of whom were convicted. DiPascali faced a sentence of up to 125 years, but he died of lung cancer in May 2015, before he could be sentenced.

In his plea allocution, Madoff stated he began his Ponzi scheme in 1991. He admitted he had never made any legitimate investments with his clients' money during this time. Instead, he said, he simply deposited the money into his personal business account at Chase Manhattan Bank. When his customers asked for withdrawals, he paid them out of the Chase account—a classic "robbing Peter to pay Paul" scenario. Chase and its successor, JPMorgan Chase, may have earned as much as $483 million from his bank account. He was committed to satisfying his clients' expectations of high returns, despite an economic recession. He admitted to false trading activities masked by foreign transfers and false SEC filings. He stated that he always intended to resume legitimate trading activity, but it proved "difficult, and ultimately impossible" to reconcile his client accounts. In the end, he said, he realized that his scam would eventually be exposed.

On June 29, 2009, Judge Chin sentenced him to the maximum sentence of 150 years in federal prison. His lawyers initially asked the judge to impose a sentence of 7 years, and later requested that the sentence be 12 years, because of Madoff's advanced age of 71 and his limited life expectancy. Madoff apologized to his victims, saying:

I have left a legacy of shame, as some of my victims have pointed out, to my family and my grandchildren. This was something I will live in for the rest of my life. I'm sorry. I know that doesn't help you.

Judge Chin had not received any mitigating factor letters from friends or family testifying to Madoff's good deeds. "The absence of such support was telling," he said. Judge Chin also said that Madoff had not been forthcoming about his crimes. "I have a sense Mr. Madoff has not done all that he could do or told all that he knows," said Chin, calling the fraud "extraordinarily evil", "unprecedented", and "staggering", and that the sentence would deter others from committing similar frauds. Judge Chin also agreed with prosecutors' contention that the fraud began at some point in the 1980s. He also noted that Madoff's crimes were "off the charts", since federal sentencing guidelines for fraud only go up to $400 million in losses.

Ruth did not attend court but issued a statement, saying: "I am breaking my silence now because my reluctance to speak has been interpreted as indifference or lack of sympathy for the victims of my husband Bernie's crime, which was exactly the opposite of the truth. I am embarrassed and ashamed. Like everyone else, I feel betrayed and confused. The man who committed this horrible fraud was not the man whom I have known for all these years."

=== Incarceration ===
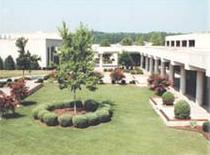
FCI Butner Medium, where Madoff was incarcerated

Madoff's attorney asked the judge to recommend that the Federal Bureau of Prisons place Madoff in the Federal Correctional Institution, Otisville, which was located 70 miles (110 km) from Manhattan. The judge, however, only recommended that Madoff be sent to a facility in the Northeast United States. He was transferred to the Federal Correctional Institution Butner Medium near Butner, North Carolina, about 45 miles (72 km) northwest of Raleigh; he was Bureau of Prisons Register #61727-054. Jeff Gammage of The Philadelphia Inquirer said, in regards to his prison assignment, "Madoff's heavy sentence likely determined his fate."

Madoff's projected release date was January 31, 2137. The release date, described as "academic" in Madoff's case because he would have to live to the age of 198, reflects a reduction for good behavior. On October 13, 2009, it was reported that Madoff experienced his first prison yard fight with another inmate, also a senior citizen. When he began his sentence, Madoff's stress levels were so severe that he broke out in hives and other skin maladies soon after.

On December 18, 2009, Madoff was moved to Duke University Medical Center in Durham, North Carolina, and was treated for several facial injuries. A former inmate later claimed that the injuries were received during an alleged altercation with another inmate. Other news reports described Madoff's injuries as more serious and including "facial fractures, broken ribs, and a collapsed lung". The Federal Bureau of Prisons said Madoff signed an affidavit on December 24, 2009, which indicated that he had not been assaulted and that he had been admitted to the hospital for hypertension. In his letter to his daughter-in-law, Madoff said that he was being treated in prison like a "Mafia don".

They call me either Uncle Bernie or Mr. Madoff. I can't walk anywhere without someone shouting their greetings and encouragement, to keep my spirit up. It's really quite sweet, how concerned everyone was about my well being, including the staff ... It's much safer here than walking the streets of New York.

After an inmate slapped Madoff because he had changed the channel on the television set, it was reported that Madoff befriended Carmine Persico, boss of the Colombo crime family since 1973, one of New York's five American Mafia families. It was believed Persico had intimidated the inmate who slapped Madoff in the face. On July 29, 2019, Madoff asked Donald Trump for a reduced sentence or pardon, to which the White House and Donald Trump made no comment. In February 2020, his lawyer filed for compassionate release from prison on the claim that he had chronic kidney failure, a terminal illness leaving him less than 18 months to live, and that the COVID-19 pandemic further threatened his life. He was hospitalized for this condition in December 2019. The request was denied due to the severity of Madoff's crimes.

== Death ==
Madoff died of hypertension, atherosclerotic cardiovascular disease, and chronic kidney disease at the age of 82 in Federal Medical Center, Butner, a federal prison for inmates with special health needs near Butner, North Carolina, on April 14, 2021. He was cremated in Durham, North Carolina. His cremation was contrary to traditional Jewish custom and his ashes went unclaimed by his family; as of 2023 his cremains are still in a lawyer's office.

== Personal life ==
Madoff met Ruth Alpern while attending Far Rockaway High School and the two began dating. Ruth graduated from high school in 1958, and earned her bachelor's degree at Queens College. On November 28, 1959, Madoff married Alpern. She was employed at the stock market in Manhattan before working in Madoff's firm, and she founded the Madoff Charitable Foundation. Bernard and Ruth Madoff had two sons: Mark (1964–2010), a 1986 graduate of the University of Michigan, and Andrew (1966–2014), a 1988 graduate of University of Pennsylvania's Wharton Business School. Both sons later worked in the trading section alongside paternal cousin Charles Weiner.

Several other family members worked for Madoff. His younger brother, Peter, an attorney, was senior managing director and chief compliance officer, and Peter's daughter, Shana Madoff, also an attorney, was the firm's compliance attorney.

Over the years, Madoff's sons had borrowed money from their parents, to purchase homes and other property. Mark Madoff owed his parents $22 million, and Andrew Madoff owed them $9.5 million. There were two loans in 2008 from Bernard Madoff to Andrew: $4.3 million on October 6, and $250,000 on September 21. Andrew owned a Manhattan apartment and a home in Greenwich, Connecticut, as did his brother Mark, prior to his death. Both sons used outside investment firms to run their own private philanthropic foundations. In March 2003, Andrew Madoff was diagnosed with mantle cell lymphoma and eventually returned to work. He was named chairman of the Lymphoma Research Foundation in January 2008, but resigned shortly after his father's arrest.

Peter Madoff (and Andrew Madoff, before his death) remained the targets of a tax fraud investigation by federal prosecutors, according to The Wall Street Journal. David Friehling, Bernard Madoff's tax accountant, who pleaded guilty in a related case, was reportedly assisting in the investigation. According to a civil lawsuit filed in October 2009, trustee Irving Picard alleges that Peter Madoff deposited $32,146 into his Madoff accounts and withdrew over $16 million; Andrew deposited almost $1 million into his accounts and withdrew $17 million; Mark deposited $745,482 and withdrew $18.1 million.

Bernard lived in Roslyn, New York, in a ranch house through the 1970s. In 1980, he purchased an ocean-front residence in Montauk, New York, for $250,000. His primary residence was on Manhattan's Upper East Side, and he was listed as chairman of the building's co-op board. He also owned a home in France and an 8,700-square-foot (808.3-square-metre) house in Palm Beach, Florida, where he was a member of the Palm Beach Country Club, where he searched for targets for his fraud. Madoff owned a 55-foot (17 m) sportfishing yacht named Bull. All three of his homes were auctioned by the U.S. Marshals Service in September 2009.

Sheryl Weinstein, former chief financial officer of Hadassah, disclosed in a memoir that she and Madoff had had an affair more than 20 years earlier. As of 1997, when Weinstein left, Hadassah had invested a total of $40 million with Bernie Madoff. By the end of 2008, Hadassah had withdrawn more than $130 million from its Madoff accounts and contends its accounts were valued at $90 million at the time of Madoff's arrest. At the victim impact sentencing hearing, Weinstein testified, calling him a "beast". According to a March 13, 2009, filing by Madoff, he and his wife were worth up to $126 million, plus an estimated $700 million for the value of his business interest in Bernard L. Madoff Investment Securities LLC.

On the morning of December 11, 2010 – exactly two years after Bernard's arrest – his son Mark was found dead in his New York City apartment. The city medical examiner ruled the cause of death as suicide by hanging.

During a 2011 interview on CBS, Ruth Madoff claimed she and her husband had attempted suicide after his fraud was exposed, both taking "a bunch of pills" in a suicide pact on Christmas Eve 2008. In November 2011, former Madoff employee David Kugel pleaded guilty to charges that arose out of the scheme. He admitted having helped Madoff create a phony paper trail, the false account statements that were supplied to clients.

Madoff had a heart attack in December 2013, and reportedly had end-stage renal disease (ESRD). According to CBS New York and other news sources, Madoff claimed in an email to CNBC in January 2014 that he had kidney cancer, but this was unconfirmed. In a court filing from his lawyer in February 2020, it was revealed Madoff had chronic kidney failure. On February 17, 2022, Madoff's sister, Sondra Weiner, and her husband, Marvin, were both found dead with gunshot wounds in their Boynton Beach, Florida home. The deaths of Sondra, 87, and Marvin, 90, were labeled by police as a potential murder-suicide.

== In the media ==
- On May 12, 2009, PBS Frontline aired The Madoff Affair.
- In season 7 of Curb Your Enthusiasm, aired in 2009, the character George Costanza (from Seinfeld) loses all of the money he made from an app called iToilet by investing with Madoff.
- Imagining Madoff was a 2010 play by Deb Margolin that tells the story of an imagined encounter between Madoff and his victims. The play generated controversy when Elie Wiesel, originally portrayed as a character in the play, threatened legal action, forcing Margolin to substitute a fictional character, "Solomon Galkin". The play was nominated for a 2012 Helen Hayes Award.
- A documentary, Chasing Madoff, describing Harry Markopolos' efforts to unmask the fraud, was released in August 2011.
- Woody Allen's 2013 film Blue Jasmine portrays a fictional couple involved in a similar scandal. Allen said that the Madoff scandal was the inspiration for the film.
- In God We Trust (2013), a documentary about Eleanor Squillari, Madoff's secretary for 25 years and her search for the truth about the fraud (The Halcyon Company).
- Madoff was played by Robert De Niro in the May 2017 HBO film The Wizard of Lies, based on the best-selling book by Diana B. Henriques. Michelle Pfeiffer plays Ruth Madoff in the film, which was released on May 20, 2017.
- Madoff, a miniseries by ABC starring Richard Dreyfuss and Blythe Danner as Bernard and Ruth Madoff, aired on February 3 and 4, 2016.
- "Ponzi Super Nova", an episode of the podcast Radiolab released February 10, 2017, in which Madoff was interviewed over prison phone.
- Chevelle's song "Face to the Floor", as described by the band, was a "pissed off, angry song about people who got taken by the Ponzi scheme that Bernie Madoff had for all those years."
- The heroine of Elin Hilderbrand's novel, Silver Girl, published in 2011 by Back Bay Books, was the wife of a Madoff-like schemer.
- Cristina Alger's novel, The Darlings, published in 2012 by Pamela Dorman Books, features a wealthy family with a Madoff-like patriarch.
- The action of James Grippando's thriller, Need You Now, published in 2012 by HarperCollins, was set in motion by the suicide of the Bernie Madoff-like Ponzi schemer Abe Cushman.
- The protagonist of Elinor Lipman's novel, The View from Penthouse B, published in 2013 by Houghton Mifflin Harcourt, loses her divorce settlement by investing it with Bernie Madoff.
- Randy Susan Meyers's novel, The Widow of Wall Street, published in 2017 by Atria Books, was a fictionalized account of the Madoff Ponzi scheme from the wife's point of view.
- Emily St. John Mandel's novel, The Glass Hotel, published in 2020 by Alfred A. Knopf, includes a character named Jonathan Alkaitis, who was based on Madoff.
- A Kaddish for Bernie Madoff (2021), a docudrama created by musician/poet Alicia Jo Rabins and directed by Alicia J. Rose, tells the story of Madoff and the system that allowed him to function for decades through the eyes of Rabins, who watches the financial crash from her 9th floor studio in an abandoned office building on Wall Street.
- In January 2023, Netflix released a four-part documentary series, Madoff: The Monster of Wall Street, produced by RadicalMedia and directed by Joe Berlinger.
- The stage production RUTHLESS - the tragic Survival of Ruth Madoff by Roger Steinmann had its world-premiere in London on June 3, 2025. Although labeled as a 'One-Woman-Trauma', the deceased Bernie is ever-present by an oversized portrait, in addition of his off-stage voice.

== See also ==
- Allen Stanford
- 2008 financial crisis
- List of investors in Bernard L. Madoff Investment Securities
- Madoff investment scandal
- Participants in the Madoff investment scandal
- Recovery of funds from the Madoff investment scandal
- White-collar crime
