= Randy Susan Meyers =

American author

Randy Susan Meyers is an American author. She was born and raised in Brooklyn, New York. She is the author of five novels and one novella: The Murderer's Daughters, The Comfort of Lies, Accidents of Marriage, The Widow of Wall Street, Waisted. Her novels have been translated into 27 languages. Three of Meyers' novels have been chosen as "Must Read Fiction" by the Massachusetts Center for the Book and have been finalists for the Massachusetts Book Award.

Before turning to writing Meyers worked as the assistant director of Common Purpose, where she worked with batterers, domestic violence victims, and at-risk youth impacted by family violence. Her own upbringing in a family with an abusive father influenced her book The Murderer's Daughters. According to WorldCat, the book is held in 1013 libraries

Meyers is the co-author of the non-fiction book Couples with Children and What To Do Before Your Book launch. She edited Women Under Scrutiny, a collection of essays. She currently lives in Boston, Massachusetts along with her husband. She teaches writing seminars at the Grub Street, Inc. Writers' Center in Boston.

In February 2013 Atria Books/Simon & Schuster released Meyers second novel, The Comfort of Lies. Accidents of Marriage, her third novel, was published in 2014.

== Publications ==
- Couples With Children, with Virginia DeLuca Wolfson (Dembner, 1981)
- The Murderer's Daughters (St. Martin's Press, 2010)
- The Comfort of Lies (Atria, 2013)
- Accidents of Marriage (Atria, 2014)
- What To Do Before Your Book Launch, with M. J. Rose (Evil Eye Concepts, 2015)
- The Widow of Wall Street (Atria, 2017)
- 19 Myths About Cheating: A Novella (Brooklyn Girl Books, 2018)
- Waisted (Atria, 2019)
- Women Under Scrutiny: Anthology of Truths, Essays, Poems, Stories and Art (Brooklyn Girl Books, 2019)
- The Fashion Orphans (Blue Box Press, 2022)
- The Many Mothers of Ivy Puddingstone (Koehler Books, 2024)
