= Lappin Foundation =

American Jewish nonprofit organization

The Robert I. Lappin Charitable Foundation is an American Jewish non-profit organization that operates programs for Jewish youth. The Foundation's largest program is the "Youth to Israel" program, which offers Jewish youth a free trip to Israel. Over 1,800 Jewish teenagers have been supported by the foundation in their visit to Israel. The program started in 1971.

It also supports enrichment programs for Jewish educators, and interfaith outreach initiatives. In 2007, the foundation gave about $1.5 million to Jewish groups.

== History ==
The foundation was founded in 1993 by Robert Israel “Bob” Lappin (1922–2020), a retired vacuum cleaner and real estate magnate and native of Swampscott, Massachusetts.

On December 12, 2008, the Lappin Foundation was forced to close due to the arrest of Bernard L. Madoff for securities fraud, and the subsequent freeze of assets that Madoff managed, which included the majority of the Lappin Foundation's assets. The group has been noted by many as one of the most severely affected clients of Madoff's firm. Additionally, the foundation had invested its employees' 401(k) fund with Madoff, all of which was presumed lost. Lappin subsequently donated replacement funding to make the 401(k) whole.

The Foundation's employees worked on a volunteer basis to raise funds to ensure Jewish Youth to Israel could continue in 2009. Due to donations by Lappin and others, the foundation reopened.

Robert I. Lappin died at the age of 98 on April 3, 2020.
