= Booker's Place: A Mississippi Story =

- Theatrical release poster
- Directed by: Raymond De Felitta
- Produced by: David Zellerford; Yvette Johnson (co-producer); Steven C. Beer (executive producer); Lynn Roer (executive producer)
- Edited by: George Gross
- Production company: Eyepatch Productions
- Release date: April 25, 2012
- Running time: 91 minutes
- Country: United States
- Language: English

Booker's Place: A Mississippi Story is a 2012 documentary film about Mack Barkes "Booker" Wright, an African-American waiter who worked in a restaurant for whites only. In 1965, Wright appeared in Mississippi: A Self Portrait, a short NBC television documentary about racism in the American South. During his interview with producer Frank De Felitta, he spoke openly about racism, and his treatment as a waiter in an all-white restaurant. The broadcast of his remarks had catastrophic consequences for Wright.

Booker's Place: A Mississippi Story was directed by the son of Frank De Felitta, Oscar-nominated, independent filmmaker Raymond De Felitta, produced by David Zellerford, and co-produced by one of Booker Wright's four grandchildren, Yvette Johnson. It includes interviews with those who lived in the community. They discuss life at the time, and the restaurant Wright owned, which catered to African-American customers.

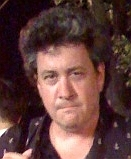
Director, Raymond De Felitta

The documentary premiered at the Tribeca Film Festival on April 25, 2012.

== Background ==
=== Mississippi: A Self Portrait ===
The original documentary, the subject of Booker's Place: A Mississippi Story, was produced by Frank De Felitta in 1965. De Felitta worked for NBC as a documentary filmmaker. He was given his own unit, and so generally had the freedom to select his own topics. He was inspired to make Mississippi: A Self Portrait after reading a New York Times Sunday Magazine article by Hodding Carter about injustice experienced by African Americans in Mississippi. He approached NBC, and the project was approved. He traveled to Mississippi to interview local residents. There, in Greenwood, he was introduced to Booker Wright, a waiter at Lusco's, a whites-only restaurant. Wright sang the menu, a gimmick at the restaurant. This was also because there were no menus, a measure used to discourage African Americans from patronizing the restaurant. Wright spoke openly about his treatment by customers, and life in a racist society. The documentary appeared on NBC television.

=== Consequences of the broadcast ===
Following the broadcast of the NBC documentary, Wright quit his job at the all-white restaurant after being shunned by customers. He was severely pistol-whipped by a policeman, and his own restaurant, Booker's Place was firebombed. Wright was later murdered by a black customer, Lloyd Lewis (or Louis) Cork, currently serving a life sentence for his murder.
