= Shana Madoff =

American attorney (born 1967)

- Born: Shana Diane Madoff; December 8, 1967 (age 58); Queens, New York, U.S.
- Other name: Shana Madoff Skoller Swanson
- Education: University of Michigan; Fordham Law School
- Occupations: Rules and compliance officer and attorney, yoga teacher
- Years active: 1995–2008
- Employer: Bernard L. Madoff Investment Securities
- Known for: Compliance officer/attorney at uncle Bernard Madoff's firm, which engaged in the largest financial fraud in U.S. history
- Spouse(s): Scott Skoller (Divorced); Eric Swanson
- Children: 2
- Parent: Peter Madoff (father)

Shana Diane Madoff (/ˈmeɪdɔːf/ MAY-doff; born December 8, 1967), sometimes referred to as Shana Madoff Skoller Swanson, is an American former attorney who is now a yoga teacher.

She is the daughter of Peter Madoff, and a niece of Bernie Madoff, who employed her as a compliance officer and attorney at Bernard L. Madoff Investment Securities (BLMIS) from 1995 until 2008. In December 2008 BLMIS was discovered to be a $65 billion Ponzi scheme, and closed as part of the Madoff investment scandal. Her uncle Bernard Madoff was sentenced to 150 years in prison for the scheme, and her father, who was her boss at the company and the chief compliance officer, was sentenced to ten years in prison.

In 2007, she married Eric Swanson, a former Assistant Director of the Office of Compliance Investigations and Examinations at the U.S. Securities and Exchange Commission (SEC). She and Swanson met originally in April 2003 when the SEC performed an inadequate examination as to whether Bernie Madoff was front running customer orders—completely missing the multibillion-dollar Ponzi scheme that her own cousins (Bernie's sons) would expose in December 2008.

No criminal charges have been filed against her regarding her role at BLMIS yet. In 2015, U.S. Marshals auctioned 420 lots of assets belonging to Shana Madoff and her father Peter, pursuant to a court order.

== Personal life ==
Shana Diane Madoff was born in Queens, New York, in 1967, and grew up in Woodbury on the North Shore of Long Island. She graduated from the University of Michigan in 1992, and from Fordham Law School in 1995.

In 1997 she married Scott Skoller, a men's clothing store manager from Roslyn, New York, and changed her name to Shana Skoller.

In 2007, she married Eric Swanson, a former Assistant Director of the Office of Compliance Investigations and Examinations at the U.S. Securities and Exchange Commission (SEC).

== Career ==
After her graduation from law school in 1995, Shana Madoff started work at her uncle's firm, Bernard L. Madoff Investment Securities (BLMIS). She was a rules and compliance officer and in-house counsel at BLMIS, a significant senior officer position for which she collected millions of dollars. She was responsible for ensuring that BLMIS complied with its legal and regulatory obligations, signing documents assuring the SEC that BLMIS's business records were truthful and accurate. In one case, she signed documents certifying to the SEC that the firm's investment advisory business, in which the fraud was occurring, had 23 clients and $17.1 billion under management, when in fact it had 4,900 customers with $68 billion in investments.

Shana Madoff was also a compliance officer and attorney for Cohmad Securities, which was co-owned by her uncle and helped bring investors to BLMIS.

Shana Madoff also held prominent positions in investment industry organizations. She served on the Executive Committee of the Compliance & Legal Division of the Securities Industry Association, which merged with another industry organization to become SIFMA, the lobbying arm of the industry, in November 2006. She then became an active member of the Executive Committee of SIFMA's Compliance & Legal Division, while her father served on SIFMA's board of directors. She resigned that position after her uncle's arrest.

== Madoff scandal ==
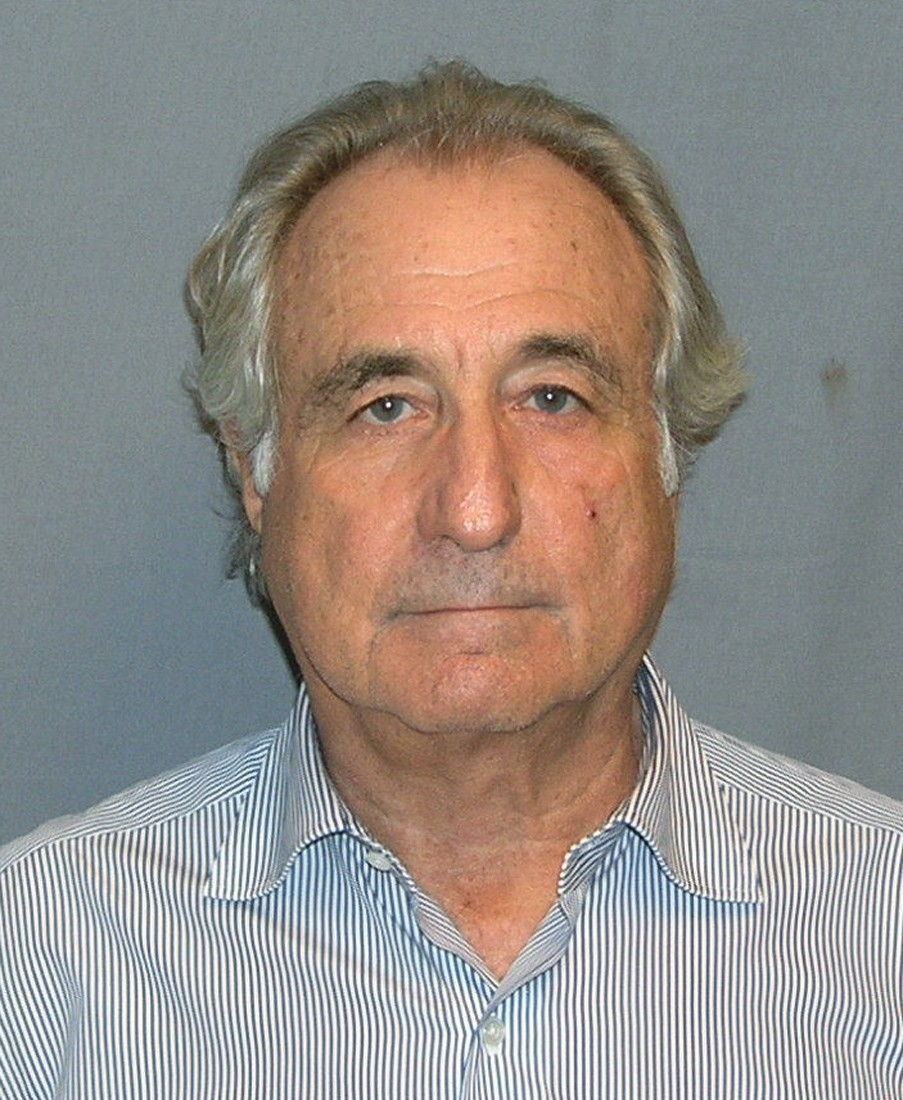
Bernard Madoff

Subsequent to the Ponzi scheme in the Madoff investment scandal becoming public, a spokesman for Shana Madoff said she had "no prior knowledge of the horrific fraud perpetuated."

She is married to Eric Swanson, an attorney and a former Assistant Director of the Office of Compliance Investigations and Examinations at the SEC, the securities regulator, whom she met in April 2003. She and Swanson met during an SEC examination of whether Bernie Madoff was running a Ponzi scheme, and the two started a regular correspondence; during 2003, Swanson sent Peter Madoff several regulatory requests.

In March 2004, SEC lawyer Genevievette Walker-Lightfoot was reviewing Madoff's firm and raised questions to Swanson (who was her boss's supervisor) about unusual trading at one of the Madoff funds; she was told to instead concentrate on an unrelated matter. Swanson and Walker-Lightfoot's boss asked for her research, but did not act upon it.

In February 2006, Swanson was emailed by Assistant Director John Nee that the SEC's New York Regional Office was investigating a complaint that Bernard Madoff might be running "the biggest Ponzi scheme ever". In April 2006, Swanson informed John McCarthy, Associate Director in the SEC Office of Compliance Inspections and Examinations, of his relationship with Shana Madoff, and McCarthy was very upset. When McCarthy found out later that month that the relationship was still continuing, and confronted Swanson about it, Swanson came clean and McCarthy was again extremely upset. Swanson left the SEC on September 15, 2006.

The SEC closed its investigation of Bernie Madoff in 2006. In 2009, after the scandal broke, SEC Inspector General H. David Kotz investigated, and concluded that there was no evidence that Swanson's romantic relationship with Shana Madoff influenced the closing of the SEC investigation of her uncle. He did conclude, however, that: "Swanson's communication with Shana during the period of time he was engaged in a cause examination of her uncle and father's firm, created the appearance of a potential conflict of interest."

Swanson left the SEC on September 15, 2006. Swanson and Shana Madoff became engaged on December 8, 2006.

The September 2007 wedding of Shana Madoff and Swanson was attended by Lori Richards, SEC Director of Compliance Investigations and Examinations, who oversaw Swanson at the SEC. In 2008, Bernard Madoff spoke at a business roundtable meeting of his "very close" relationship with an SEC lawyer, and chuckled: "my niece even married one". In April 2009, Richards recused herself from the Madoff investigation. Swanson is now general counsel at BATS Trading, the third-largest U.S. stock exchange.

Shana Madoff's uncle Bernard pleaded guilty to federal charges against him, following the Madoff investment scandal becoming public, in March 2009. He was sentenced to 150 years in prison. Her father, Peter, the chief compliance officer of BLMIS, who was her boss at the company, pleaded guilty in July 2012 to fabricating documents to evade taxes and to help BLMIS escape SEC scrutiny. He was sentenced to 10 years in prison. As part of her father's forfeiture deal with the Justice Department, the $2.3 million in proceeds from selling Shana's five-bedroom East Hampton house was surrendered.

In October 2009, court-appointed trustee Irving Picard charged in a civil lawsuit that she played a role in filing a January 2008 form that inflated the assets that the Madoff firm in fact had. Picard sued her, her father, and two cousins (Mark Madoff and Andrew Madoff) for what he claimed was $198.7 million of misappropriated customer money while they were executives of BLMIS, alleging that had they done their jobs honestly the scheme might never have succeeded or continued as long as it did. Picard said:

It would seem impossible for her to carry out her compliance duties, year in and year out, without questioning or considering whether BLMIS's IA [investment advisory business] was a fraud. Either [she and her father] failed completely to carry out their required supervisory/compliance roles, or they knew about the fraud, but covered it up.

She called the claim baseless, and said she had no knowledge of the scheme.

In 2012, U.S. Attorney Preet Bharara stated: "We are not yet finished calling to account everyone responsible for the epic fraud of Bernard Madoff and the epic pain of his many victims." Columbia Law School Professor John Coffee, referring to Shana and her cousin Andrew, said: "The prosecutors ... have done the low-hanging fruit; they are now reaching to the medium-level fruit… Beyond the two kids, I do not know how much farther they will want to go." Coffee said:

Prosecutors can use the same charges as they did against her father, maybe not seeking 10 years, but I could see them giving her the choice of pleading to a felony conviction on the same grounds. She is a lawyer; lawyers don't get the benefit of the doubt. They could say you knew this [SEC filing] was false, even if you did not know it was a Ponzi scheme.
