= Ray Madoff =

American writer, lawyer

Ray D. Madoff is an American legal scholar. She is a professor at Boston College Law School.

== Books ==
- Immortality and the Law: The Rising Power of the American Dead (2010)
- The Second Estate: How the Tax Code Made an American Aristocracy (2025)
