= Mark Madoff =

American investment financier (1964–2010)

- Undated photo of Madoff
- Born: Mark David Madoff; March 11, 1964; Long Island, New York, U.S.
- Died: December 11, 2010 (aged 46); New York City, U.S.
- Cause of death: Suicide by hanging
- Education: University of Michigan (BA)
- Occupations: Businessman; financier
- Known for: Responses to his father's fraud, including suicide
- Spouses: Susan Elkin (div. 2000); Stephanie Mack (m. 2003)
- Children: 4
- Parents: Bernie Madoff (father); Ruth Madoff (mother)
- Relatives: Andrew Madoff (brother); Shana Madoff (cousin)

Mark David Madoff (/ˈmeɪdɔːf/ MAY-doff; March 11, 1964 – December 11, 2010) was an American financier who alongside his brother was a contributor in exposing the multi-billion dollar Ponzi scheme committed by their father, Bernie Madoff.

== Personal life ==
Madoff was born and raised on Long Island, New York, the elder of Bernard and Ruth Madoff's two sons. He earned a bachelor's degree in economics from the University of Michigan in 1986, where he had been a member of the Sigma Alpha Mu fraternity. He married his college girlfriend, Susan Elkin, and moved to Greenwich, Connecticut, where they raised two children. They divorced in 2000, and he eventually moved back to Manhattan. In 2003, he married Stephanie Mikesell, with whom he had two children, born in 2006 and 2008.

== Career and investment scandal ==
Madoff joined his father's company in 1987. He and his brother, Andrew Madoff (1966–2014), managed the firm's legitimate market-making and proprietary trading arm.

In December 2008, Mark and his brother confronted their father over his plans to distribute hundreds of millions of dollars in bonuses to employees months ahead of schedule. Their father then confessed to them that his business was based on a "big lie", a long-running Ponzi scheme that was collapsing under the then-ongoing Great Recession. He asked them to give him 24 hours to get his affairs in order before going to the authorities; however, the brothers went to the authorities immediately on the advice of their lawyers. Bernard Madoff was arrested the next day, and Mark never spoke with him again.

While no criminal charges were filed against Mark Madoff, the scandal and its aftermath proved devastating to his personal and professional life. Mark, his mother and his brother were all the subject of constant media attention, with articles speculating that they had been involved in their father's crime, or at least were aware of it. He also found it extremely difficult to find employment.

== Death and aftermath ==
On December 11, 2010, Madoff was found dead in his Manhattan apartment at 158 Mercer Street. His suicide occurred on the second anniversary of his father's arrest. Madoff’s death was investigated by both law enforcement and medical authorities.

Madoff's estate amounted to $18.6 million. In 2012, his ex-wife, Susan Elkin, and widow, Stephanie Mack, were sued by Irving Picard, the trustee for his father's swindled clients, under a claim they should have known their wealth was based on crime. In 2017, the lawsuit concluded, and Mark Madoff's estate was left with $1.75 million.
