= Andrew Madoff =

American businessman (1966–2014)

- Madoff during an appearance on the Today Show in 2011
- Born: April 8, 1966; Roslyn, New York, U.S.
- Died: September 3, 2014 (aged 48); New York City, U.S.
- Occupation: Financier
- Known for: Response to his father's fraud
- Spouse: Deborah Anne West (m. 1992; sep. 2007)
- Partner: Catherine Hooper
- Children: 2
- Parents: Bernie Madoff (father); Ruth Madoff (mother)
- Relatives: Mark Madoff (brother)

Andrew Madoff (/ˈmeɪdɔːf/ MAY-doff; April 8, 1966 – September 3, 2014) was an American financier best known for, alongside his brother, exposing the financial crimes of their father, Bernie Madoff, whose Ponzi scheme has been widely described as the largest and most successful in history.

== Biography ==
Andrew earned a bachelor's degree in economics from the University of Pennsylvania in 1988. He and his brother Mark worked for their father's firm, but in a division removed from their father's deceptive practices. As markets plunged during the 2008 financial crisis, their father was unable to maintain the deception; they later described how he confessed his ongoing scheme to them and their mother on December 10, 2008. Their father asked them to give him 24 hours before going to the police so he could get his affairs in order, but the brothers chose not to; their father was arrested the next day, and the brothers never spoke with him again.

Andrew married Deborah Anne West in January 1992. According to Jerry Oppenheimer's Madoff with the Money, the pair separated in 2007; Madoff later became engaged to Catherine Hooper, claiming that they met after his separation, although that has been disputed. Madoff and Hooper announced their plans to marry and lived together for years, but his divorce had not been completed prior to his death.

Andrew Madoff was diagnosed with cancer in 2003. His cancer went into remission, but returned in 2011, which he attributed to stress from the fallout over his father's crimes. Andrew Madoff died while undergoing further cancer treatment on September 3, 2014.

Before his death, Madoff and Hooper set up an agency that specialized in grief counseling.

After his death, Reuters described ongoing attempts to sue Andrew Madoff and his brother's estate, in spite of a British court's ruling that the pair were not co-conspirators. Irving Picard, trustee for their father's victims, sued Andrew, and sued his brother's estate, on July 15, 2014, a month before he died.

Andrew Madoff retained an estate of $16 million; his will left a substantial portion of this estate to his wife including a trust fund for his daughter; however, due to the lawsuit, they did not receive the money. In 2017, the lawsuit concluded, and Andrew's estate was left with $1 million.

== Media ==
The stage production RUTHLESS – the tragic Survival of Ruth Madoff by Roger Steinmann had its world-premiere in London on June 3, 2025. Although labeled as a 'One-Woman-Trauma', the deceased Andrew is ever-present by an oversized portrait, in addition to his frequent off-stage voice.
