= Schulte Roth & Zabel =

American and British former law firm

Schulte Roth & Zabel, LLP
- Headquarters: 919 Third Avenue; New York City
- No. of offices: 3
- No. of attorneys: Approximately 320
- Key people: David Efron; Mark Elovitz; Paul Roth; Stephen Schulte; William D. Zabel
- Date founded: 1969
- Company type: LLP
- Dissolved: Merged with McDermott Will & Emery in 2025
- Website: srz.com

Schulte Roth & Zabel, LLP (often shortened to "SRZ") was a full service law firm with offices in New York City, Washington, D.C., and London. The number of attorneys practicing at the firm globally was approximately 320 as of 2020, down from approximately 375 attorneys in 2013.

The firm's practices included investment management; regulatory & compliance; securities & capital markets; bank regulatory; business reorganization; distressed investing; distressed debt & claims trading; mergers & acquisitions; employment & employee benefits; environmental; finance; individual client services; intellectual property, sourcing & technology; litigation; real estate; shareholder activism; structured products & derivatives; and tax.

On August 1, 2025, the firm merged with McDermott Will & Emery to form McDermott Will & Schulte, creating a combined firm with more than 1,750 attorneys across 20+ offices worldwide.

== History ==
The firm was founded in 1969 by seven attorneys under the age of 35. William D. Zabel, Daniel S. Shapiro, and Paul N. Roth met as associates at Cleary, Gottlieb, Steen & Hamilton. Roth had worked on a transaction with Stephen J. Schulte, who was an associate at Fried, Frank, Harris, Shriver & Jacobson, and through Schulte, the others met Charles Goldstein, also an associate at Fried Frank. Additionally, Schulte connected the group to Thomas Baer, who was in private practice; and John G. McGoldrick, who was a partner at Kaye, Scholer, Fierman, Hays & Handler. Burton Lehman, the eighth partner in the new firm, joined the original seven from Cleary Gottlieb shortly after they opened their doors.

The firm's first name was Baer & McGoldrick. In 1977, the name of the firm was changed to Schulte & McGoldrick following Baer's departure. Following McGoldrick's departure in 1981 to become counsel to then-Governor Hugh Carey, the name of the firm was changed to Schulte Roth & Zabel.

The firm's London office, offering American and English law capabilities, launched in 2002. The firm opened its Washington, D.C. office in 2008.

On August 1, 2025, the firm merged with McDermott Will & Emery, forming a new firm under the name McDermott Will & Schulte. Following the merger, several former Schulte partners took on leadership roles in the New York and London offices of the new entity.

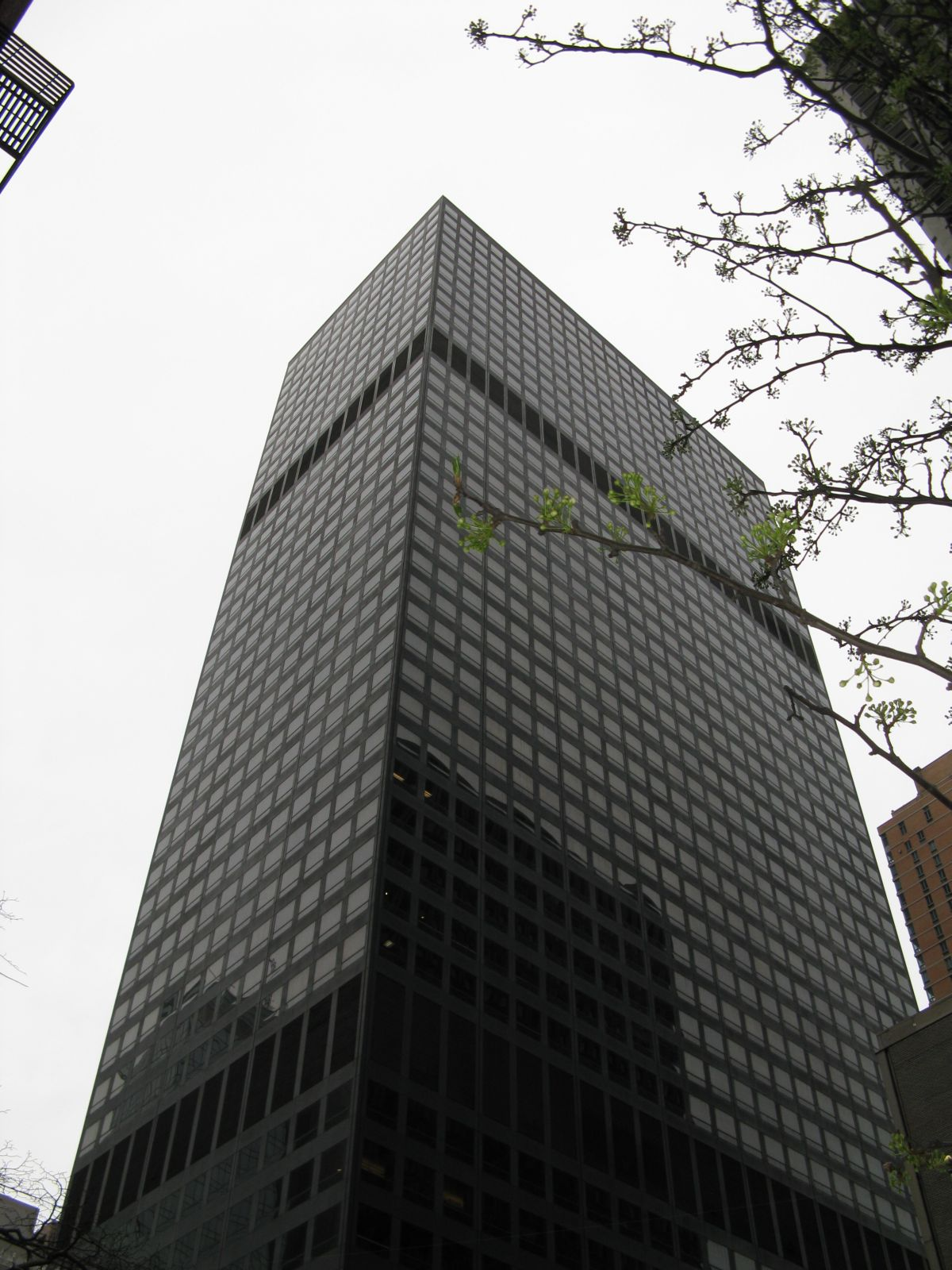
Schulte Roth & Zabel's New York headquarters at 919 Third Avenue, New York, NY

== Recognitions & rankings ==
Chambers Global ranked SRZ as a Band 1 law firm in Investment Funds (Hedge Funds, Global-wide). Chambers USA recognized SRZ in Investment Funds (Hedge Funds, Nationwide), Capital Markets (Structured Products, Nationwide), Bankruptcy/Restructuring (New York), Corporate/M&A (New York), Real Estate (Mainly Corporate & Finance, New York) and Tax (New York).

It was also named "Best Onshore Law Firm – Client Service" at the HFMWeek US Hedge Fund Services Awards and its hedge fund practice was recognized for its "commercial significance" by the Hedge Fund Insight "The Hedge Fund Hot 100" list in 2013.

== Notable representations ==
The firm advised Albertsons LLC, Cerberus Capital Management LP and the investor group, which includes Kimco Realty Corporation, Klaff Realty LP, Lubert-Adler Partners LP, and Schottenstein Stores Corporation in the $9 billion acquisition the Safeway Inc. SRZ also advised Cerberus Capital Management LP when SUPERVALU INC. unveiled a $3.3 billion deal to sign over its five biggest store chains and a stake in its remaining business to a group of investors led by Cerberus.

The firm represented the joint venture, The Related Companies and Oxford Properties Group, in developing Hudson Yards, a $15 billion project, in closing nearly $1.4 billion in equity investments and debt financing for the center's first tower on New York City's West Side.

The firm secured a reorganization plan for Quigley Co. in an asbestos-related Chapter 11 case that discharged at least $5.6 billion of current and future asbestos liability.

The firm represented Wayzata Investment Partners in the formation of Wayzata Opportunities Fund III, which closed with approximately $2.7 billion of committed capital.

The firm represented Marlin Equity Partners in its $891 million all-cash acquisition of Tellabs and also represented Marlin Equity Partners in its acquisition of Nokia Siemens Networks' optical networks business to form Coriant.

The firm secured dismissals on behalf of Tullett Prebon plc in a series of lawsuits and data cases brought by affiliates of rival inter-dealer broker BGC Partners Inc.

The firm represented Cerberus Capital Management LP in its sale of Chrysler Financial to TD Bank Group for cash consideration of approximately $6.3 billion. TD Bank, a wholly owned subsidiary of TD, acquired Chrysler Financial in the U.S. and Canada. The deal was named the biggest deal of 2010 in The Globe and Mail's list of "Biggest Canadian Mergers, Acquisitions and Restructurings."

The firm represented the estate of the late philanthropist Jeffry Picower, who was the target of various civil suits, in reaching a landmark settlement with the Department of Justice and the trustee for the liquidation of Bernard L. Madoff Investment Securities LLC relating to claims arising out of the Madoff Ponzi scheme. The $7.2 billion settlement allowed Barbara Picower, the executor of her husband's estate, to return all monies her husband received from the Madoff Ponzi scheme and donate the vast bulk of his remaining fortunes to charity.

The firm represented figures connected to the Madoff investment scandal, including J. Ezra Merkin, the financier and money manager targeted in various civil lawsuits by investors and Irving Picard, the trustee of Bernand Madoff Investment Securities LLC.

== Notable attorneys ==
- Richard A. Davey, Massachusetts Secretary of Transportation
- Peter Hatch, Commissioner of the New York City Department of Consumer and Worker Protection
- Beryl A. Howell, Judge of the United States District Court for the District of Columbia
- Brian P. Kavanagh, member of the New York State Assembly
- John G. McGoldrick, Counsel to Governor Hugh Carey
- Ben Quayle, former member of the United States House of Representatives, son of Former Vice President of the United States Dan Quayle

== See also ==
- List of largest United States-based law firms by profits per partner
