= Daniel Grabauskas =

American transportation executive and government figure

- Grabauskas in 2005

General Manager of the Massachusetts Bay Transportation Authority
- In office 2005–2009
- Preceded by: Michael H. Mulhern
- Succeeded by: Richard A. Davey

Massachusetts Secretary of Transportation
- In office 2003–2005
- Preceded by: James H. Scanlan
- Succeeded by: John Cogliano

Massachusetts Registrar of Motor Vehicles
- In office 1999–2002
- Preceded by: Richard M. Lyons
- Succeeded by: Kimberly Hinden

Massachusetts Director of Consumer Affairs
- In office 1998–1999
- Preceded by: Jane M. Swift
- Succeeded by: Jennifer Davis Carey

Personal details
- Born: Daniel Anthony Grabauskas; June 27, 1963 (age 63) Worcester, Massachusetts, U.S.
- Party: Republican
- Education: College of the Holy Cross (BA); Cornell University (MBA)

Daniel Anthony Grabauskas (born June 27, 1963) is an American transportation executive and government figure, who is the former executive director and CEO of the Honolulu Authority for Rapid Transportation (HART) and former general manager of the Massachusetts Bay Transportation Authority (MBTA).

== Early life and education ==
Grabauskas was born in Worcester, Massachusetts. He is the eldest of four children (sisters Lisa, Karen, and brother David). His father, Drasutis Antanas "Tony" Grabauskas, was a native of Lithuania who emigrated to the United States with his parents in 1949 and died in 2010. His mother, Patricia (Sheehan) Grabauskas-Caruso, is a native of Milbury, Massachusetts.

Grabauskas grew up in the Central Massachusetts towns of Sutton and Auburn. After attending St. John's High School, he graduated from the College of the Holy Cross with a B.A. and earned his M.B.A. from the Johnson Graduate School of Management at Cornell University.

== Early career ==
Grabauskas began his government career in 1987 on the staff of Massachusetts State Senator Mary L. Padula (R-Lunenburg) and soon became her chief of staff. After Padula's appointment as Massachusetts Secretary of the Executive Office of Communities and Development (EOCD) in 1991, he briefly worked as chief of staff for State Senator Richard Tisei (R-Wakefield) before joining Padula as a Deputy Secretary of EOCD from 1991 to 1995. He then served as the chief of staff to the Massachusetts Secretary of Health and Human Services. From 1995 to 1996 Grabauskas lived and worked in Lithuania as the resident program officer for the nonprofit International Republican Institute. In 1997 he became chief of staff in the Massachusetts Department of Economic Development. From 1998 to 1999, Grabauskas served as the state's Director of Consumer Affairs under Gov. Paul Cellucci.

== Registrar of Motor Vehicles ==
From 1999 to 2002, Grabauskas served as Massachusetts' Registrar of Motor Vehicles. At the time of his appointment, the agency was described by the Boston Globe as "plagued with long lines and charges of mismanagement" and was considered a political liability after series of articles in the Lawrence Eagle-Tribune detailed the interminable waits at the Registry. During his tenure as Registrar, Grabauskas was able to reduce the average wait time at the agency from an hour and fifteen minutes to less than ten minutes. He also instituted the use of the Q-Matic queuing system, which allows customers to view their estimated wait times on customized tickets or online. In addition, the number of online transaction available to the public was greatly expanded, with online transactions rising from about 30,000 in 1999 to over 500,000 in 2002.

== Campaign for State Treasurer ==
In January 2002, Grabauskas resigned as Registrar to run for Treasurer of Massachusetts. He defeated Bruce A. Herzfelder in the Republican primary 53% to 47%. He lost in the general election to Democrat Tim Cahill 51% to 41%.

== Secretary of Transportation ==
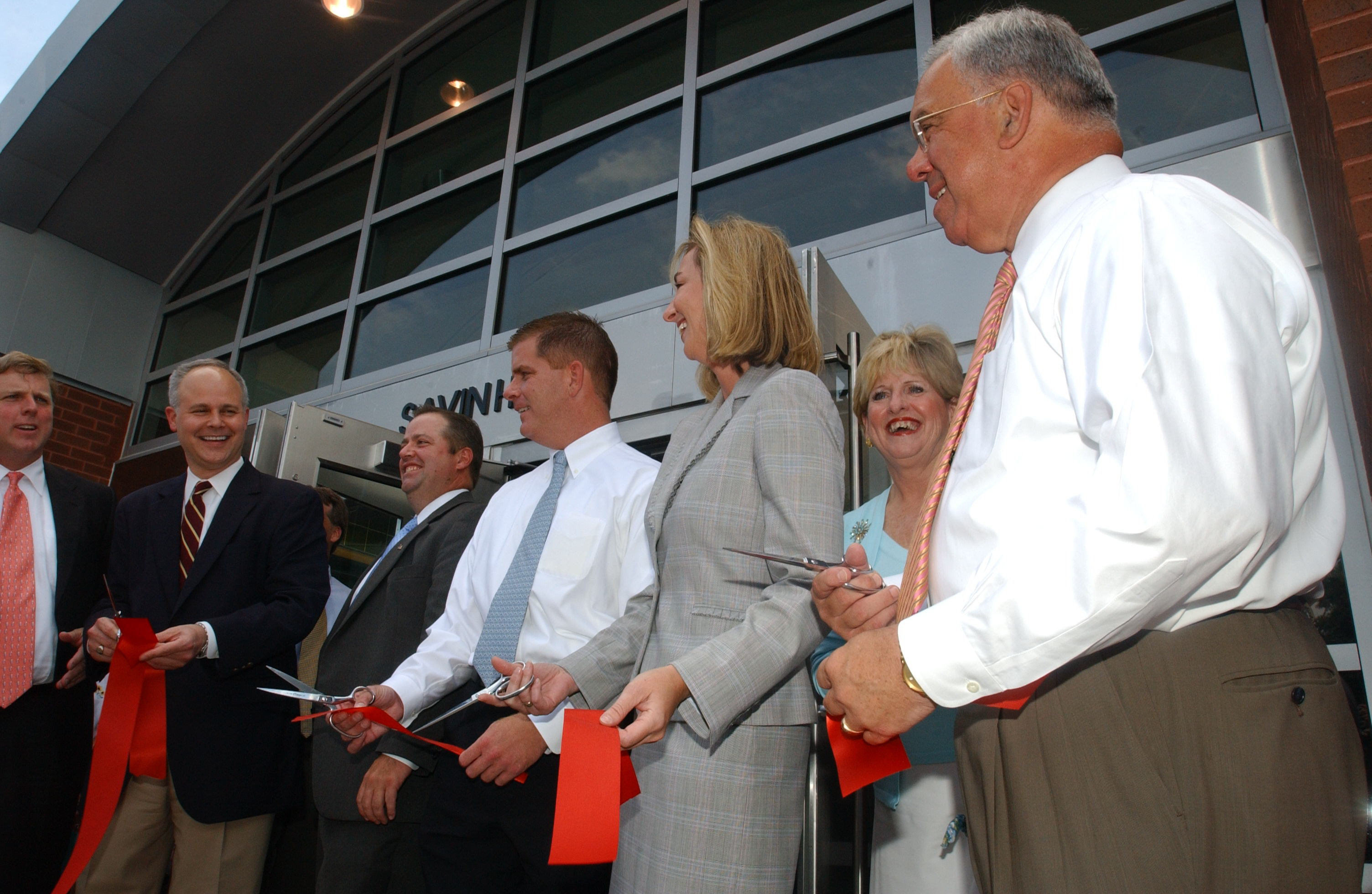
Grabauskas (second from left) at the reopening of Savin Hill station as Secretary of Transportation in 2005

After that loss, Governor-elect Mitt Romney named Grabauskas to his cabinet as Secretary of Transportation and Construction. He also served as a member of the Massachusetts Turnpike Authority board. During his tenure as Transportation Secretary, the department employed a "fix it first" strategy" which prioritized repairs to existing infrastructure over the construction of new ones. He oversaw the introduction of the first statewide 20-year transportation plan. The plan directed that at least 75 percent of all new capital spending be focused toward maintaining and improving the state's existing transportation network with these funds dedicated to bridge repair, highway reconstruction, de-bottlenecking, intersection and interchange modernization and ensuring a transit system that is in a state of good repair. The plan also included limited transit expansions, prioritizing projects that earn federal dollars, win community support and encourage local contribution.

== MBTA General Manager ==
In 2005, Grabauskas resigned his position as Transportation Secretary to become General Manager of the Massachusetts Bay Transportation Authority (MBTA). During his four-plus years as General Manager, the MBTA switched its payment method from tokens to the CharlieCard, construction on the Greenbush Line was completed, and WiFi service was installed on commuter rail trains and boats.

In 2009, the MBTA bought out the remainder of Grabauskas' contract, citing the Authority's continuing financial problems, customer service complaints, and Grabauskas' handling of two subway accidents. Grabauskas' ouster, which was engineered by Governor Deval Patrick and Transportation Secretary James Aloisi, was criticized by the state Republican Party, who believed that the Republican-appointed Grabauskas was being used as a scapegoat. It was also criticized by Democrats Thomas Menino and Steven Baddour, with the latter describing it as "trying to settle a political score at taxpayers' expense".

After his departure, Grabauskas served as a senior fellow for public policy at MassINC and as chairman and senior strategic adviser of the Bronner Center for Transportation Management.

== Honolulu Authority for Rapid Transportation ==
In March 2012 Grabauskas was named Executive Director and CEO of the Honolulu Authority for Rapid Transportation (HART) after he and the HART board of directors agreed on a three-year contract that included an annual base salary of $245,000, a $36,000 a year housing allowance, a transportation allowance of $6,000 a year, and a potential $35,000 annual performance bonus. HART oversees the Skyline rail project, the largest public works project in the history of the state of Hawaii. The project, which partially opened in 2020, is a 20-mile long automated rail system that plans to operate a fleet of 80 rail cars and an infrastructure of 21 stations, a 43-acre maintenance and storage facility, three park-and-ride lots, and one park-and-ride structure.

Throughout planning and construction, Skyline struggled with cost overruns, with cost estimates rising from $4 billion in 2006 to $12.4 billion in 2021. Grabauskas attributed overruns during his tenure to inflation and to lawsuits that delayed construction, while critics attributed it to poor management by HART, saying that it waited longer than necessary to solicit bids for station construction and failed to realistically estimate costs.

In August 2016, Grabauskas resigned from HART amid criticism from members of the HART Board of Directors, including from chairwoman Colleen Hanabusa. HART Board of Directors member Michael D. Formby was named as interim director.

Party political offices
Preceded by Robert Maginn	Republican nominee for Treasurer and Receiver-General of Massachusetts; 2002	Vacant Title next held by Karyn Polito
