= 919 Third Avenue =

Office skyscraper in Manhattan, New York

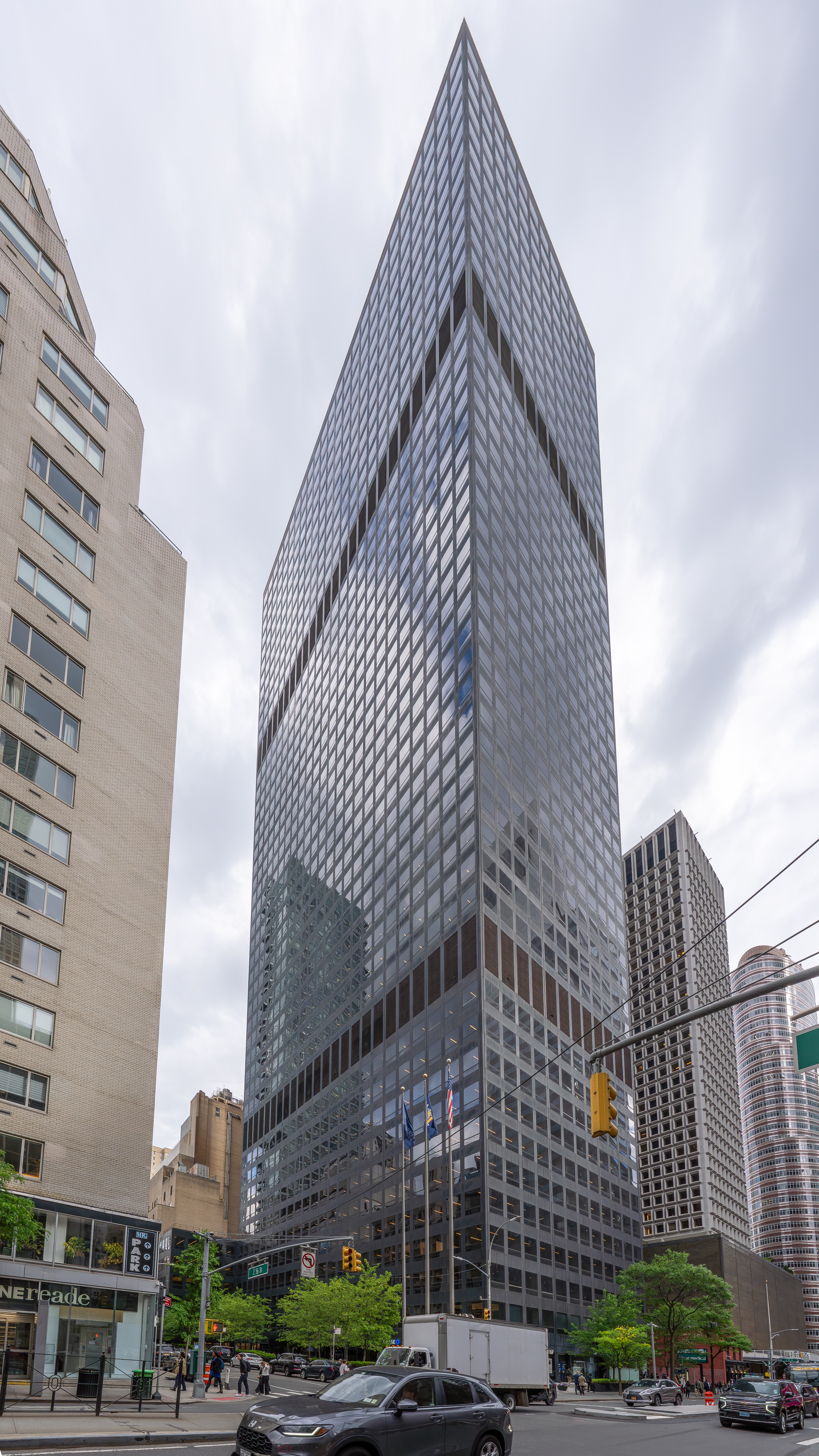
- Interactive map of the 919 Third Avenue area

General information
- Status: Completed
- Type: Office
- Location: 919 3rd Avenue; New York City, New York, U.S.
- Coordinates: 40°45′32.5″N 73°58′4.8″W
- Completed: 1971
- Opening: 1971
- Owner: SL Green

Height
- Roof: 615 ft (187 m)

Technical details
- Floor count: 47
- Floor area: 1,399,986 sq ft (130,063 m^{2})

Design and construction
- Architect: Skidmore, Owings & Merrill
- Structural engineer: Irwin Cantor & Associates, PC
- Main contractor: Tishman Construction

919 Third Avenue is an office building in at the intersection of Third Avenue and East 55th Street in Midtown Manhattan, New York City, U.S. Built in 1971, the building is 615 feet (187 meters) tall with 47 floors, and is tied with four other buildings, 750 7th Avenue, the New York Life Building, Tower 49, and The Epic in its position as the 118th tallest building in New York. The building was designed by Skidmore, Owings and Merrill.

== History ==
During the mid-1960s, in what the New York Times called "one of the most unusual Manhattan real estate transactions in recent years", developers of the new skyscraper decided to build around a Third Avenue establishment: P. J. Clarke's bar and restaurant. The property owner at the time refused to sell to the developers.

In December 1970, the fifth floor suffered a fire partially destroying part of the floor, injuring 20, and killing three. The building was completed in 1970, and tenant work was still in progress at the time of the fire. Use of the elevators resulted in the three fire deaths when the car inadvertently stopped at the fire floor. Others were almost killed in the same way but were rescued by fire fighters.

The City of New York created the most restrictive law of its kind for high-rise buildings. [Local Law # 5 of 1973], more than just steel and concrete as safety measures, adequate fire protection and a process to safely evacuate a high-rise building were introduced as a means to protect property and provide life safety for the occupants. The Local Law # 5 of 1973, called for Fire Safety Directors to be on duty for each building over 100 feet in height or occupied with more than 100 people above or below the street or more than 500 people in total.

The building was occupied principally by carpet manufacturers and carpet wholesalers and the fire started in occupancy of the type. The fire was confined for the most part to a specific area by the fire partitions required and the un-pierced horizontal separations. The fire did warp the exterior skin allowing a small amount of fire penetration to the floor above, but for the most part it was contained by the building structure. The fire, though contained, was very intense and did structural damage to the floor systems above. Total property damage to the building and its contents was estimated at $2.5 million.

In July 1996, two repairmen almost died when a gust of wind smashed their scaffold through a window.

== Tenants ==
Notable occupants of 919 Third Avenue include Jenner & Block, Schulte Roth & Zabel, Bloomberg L.P. and Bloomingdale's. In November 2024, New York State Governor Kathy Hochul announced that she would be moving her Manhattan office to the building.

The building was also the home of the New York offices of law firms Skadden, Arps, Slate, Meagher & Flom until 1999, and of Debevoise & Plimpton until 2023.

It is owned by SL Green Realty Corp.

== See also ==
- List of tallest buildings in New York City
