= Stephanie Pollack =

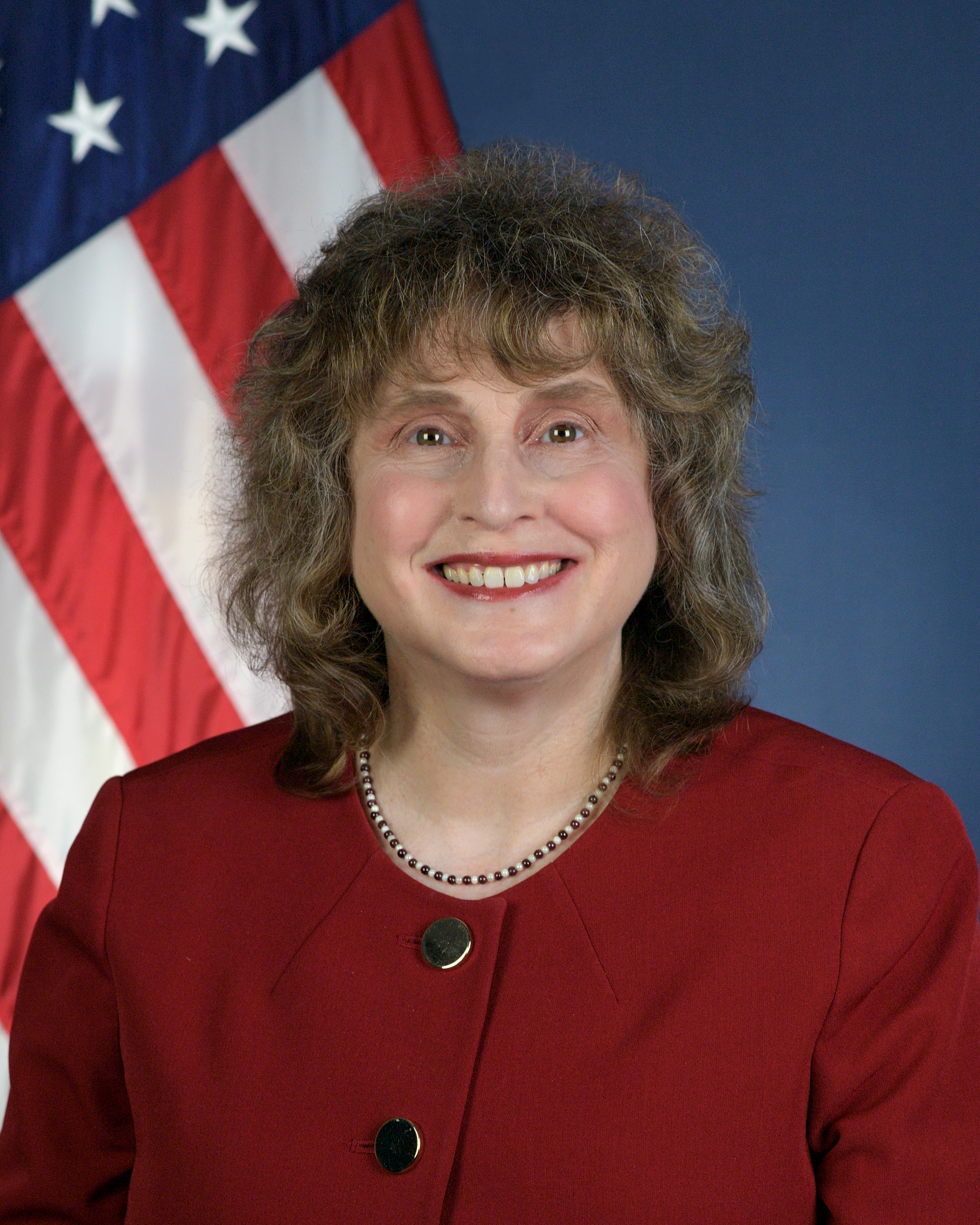
- Official portrait, 2021

Deputy Administrator of the Federal Highway Administration
- In office January 27, 2021 – February 1, 2023
- President: Joe Biden
- Preceded by: Mala Parker
- Succeeded by: Andrew Rogers

Secretary of the Massachusetts Department of Transportation
- In office January 2015 – January 26, 2021
- Governor: Charlie Baker
- Preceded by: Richard A. Davey
- Succeeded by: Jamey Tesler

Personal details
- Born: East Hanover, New Jersey, U.S.
- Party: Democratic
- Spouse: Kenneth Snow
- Education: Massachusetts Institute of Technology (BS, BS); Harvard University (JD)

Stephanie Pollack is an American government official who served as the deputy administrator of the Federal Highway Administration. Pollack also served as acting administrator pending Senate confirmation of administrator nominee Shailen Bhatt. From 2015 to 2021 Pollack served as the secretary and CEO of the Massachusetts Department of Transportation. Pollack previously worked for the Conservation Law Foundation (CLF), the Greater Boston Institute, BlueWave Strategies, and Northeastern University before starting her position at MassDOT. Pollack was the first female secretary of transportation in Massachusetts.

== Education ==
In 1982, Pollack received a Bachelor of Science in mechanical engineering and a Bachelor of Science in public policy from the Massachusetts Institute of Technology. She graduated magna cum laude with a Juris Doctor from Harvard Law School in 1985.

== Career ==
Pollack began work with the Conservation Law Foundation as a sophomore at MIT, doing policy research on coal-fired power plants. Pollack continued to work at the CLF after graduating from Harvard, rising to senior VP and acting president before departing in 2006. She also worked as a senior strategy consultant for groups including the Boston Transportation Department and Massport. When the Commonwealth of Massachusetts negotiated Big Dig mitigation with Pollack and ultimately claimed they could not afford her proposals, Pollack stated "They can't just say, 'We're broke.'"

In 2004, Pollack took a position at Northeastern University as a senior research associate and senior director at the Center for Urban and Regional Policy and an adjunct professor for the Northeastern University School of Law. During this time Pollack also served on the board of the Newton Transportation Advisory Committee and the MassDOT Transportation Advisory Committee.

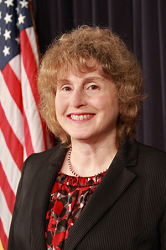
Portrait of Pollack from her time as Massachusetts secretary of transportation

In January 2015, Pollack was chosen by Massachusetts Governor Charlie Baker to lead the Massachusetts Department of Transportation. Pollack described her appointment as surprising, given fundamentally different policy views between Baker, a lifelong Republican, and her own liberal views as a Democrat.

In January 2021, it was announced that Pollack was appointed to serve as deputy administrator of the Federal Highway Administration.

== Controversies ==
Pollack received criticism for lapses at Massachusetts Department of Transportation's Registry of Motor Vehicles (RMV) that led to a crash that killed seven people in 2019. The RMV director and RMV consultant Fast Technologies LLC both claimed they had sent information about the RMV data issues to Pollack prior to the crash. A year later, Pollack acknowledged responsibility for the scandal and pledged to fix the issues.

Pollack also received backlash for an expedited $100,000 private bathroom at MassDOT Headquarters in 2018. The controversy has become known as MassDOT's "Golden Bathroom" or "Toilet-Gate". Pollack initially refused to speak to the press about the bathroom, but later released a memo stating "We should have been more careful".

== Personal life ==
Pollack met her husband Kenneth Snow while at MIT. She has three children, all of whom are studying engineering. Pollack has lived in Newton, Massachusetts, for over 20 years and is a strong advocate of car free transportation. Pollack is an observant Orthodox Jew. Pollack has been a Democrat since she first registered to vote at age 18.
