= Edward Reich =

American activist (1903–1983)

Edward Reich (1903–1983) was a consumer protection activist.

== Professional history ==
Reich received a bachelor's degree from City College of New York, a master's degree from Columbia University and a Ph.D. from New York University. He directed the consumer education program of the New York City Board of Education and was a consultant on food pricing to the New York City Department of Consumer Affairs. Reich served on the board of directors of Consumers Union for 30 years. There from 1958 to 1961 he served as vice president and as treasurer from 1961 until he retired in 1973.

== Personal life ==
Reich died at 80 years of age in Mount Kisco, New York.
