= The Epic (building) =

Residential skyscraper in Manhattan, New York

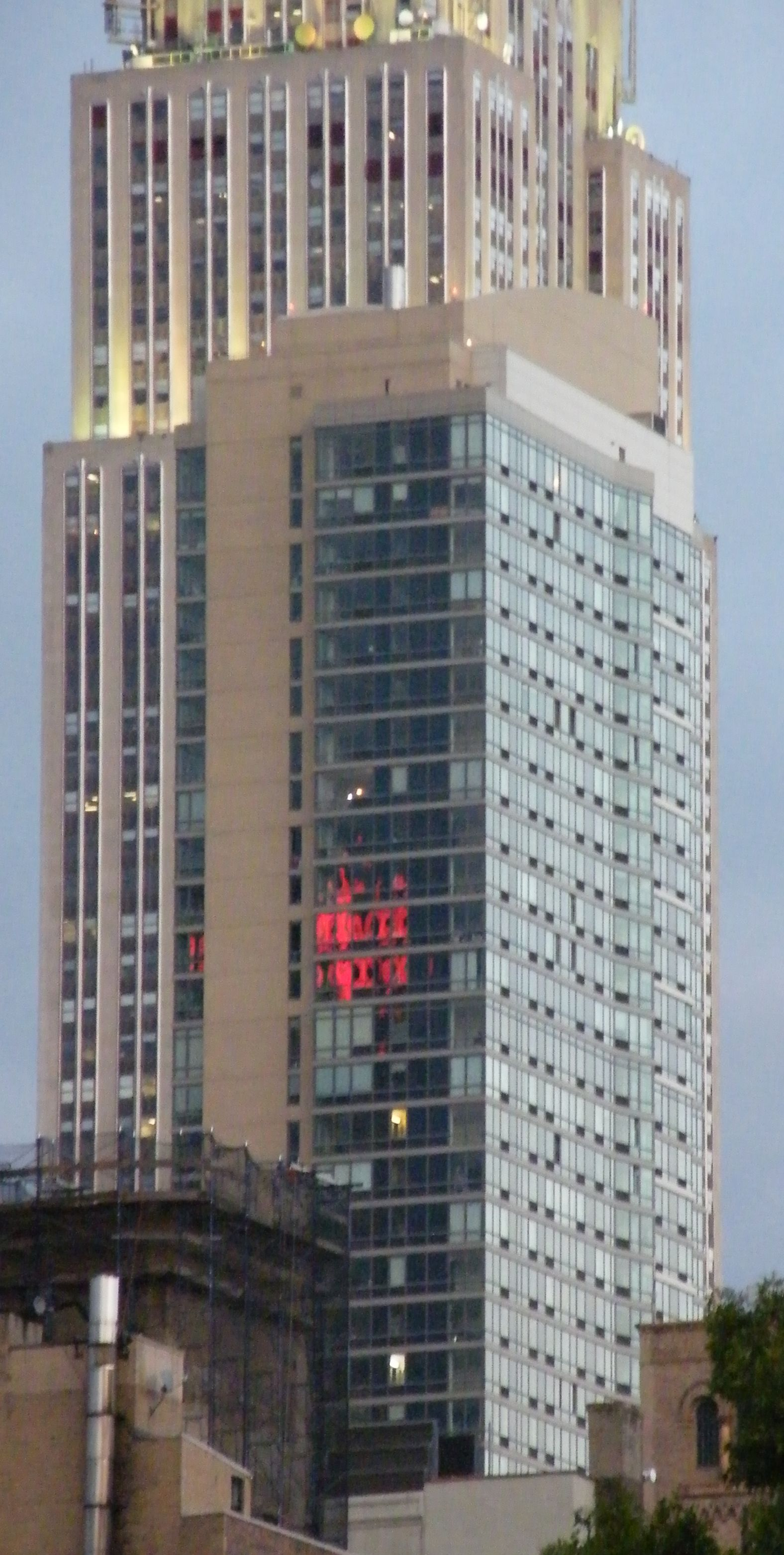
- The Epic in front of the Empire State Building
- Interactive map of the The Epic area

General information
- Type: Residential
- Location: 125 West 31st Street; New York City; NY 10001; United States
- Coordinates: 40.748631°N 73.989948°W
- Construction started: 2005
- Completed: 2007
- Owner: Fetner Properties LLC

Height
- Roof: 615 ft (187 m)
- Top floor: 561 ft (171 m)

Technical details
- Floor count: 58
- Floor area: 573,996 sq ft (53,326.0 m^{2})

Design and construction
- Architects: Schuman, Lichtenstein, Claman & Efron, FXFOWLE Architects

Other information
- Parking: 90

The Epic is a 615 ft (187 m) tall skyscraper in New York City. It was constructed from 2005 to 2007, and has 58 floors. It is tied with four other buildings, the New York Life Building, 919 Third Avenue, Tower 49, and 750 7th Avenue in its position as the 118th tallest building in New York, and has 460 rooms.

== Gallery ==
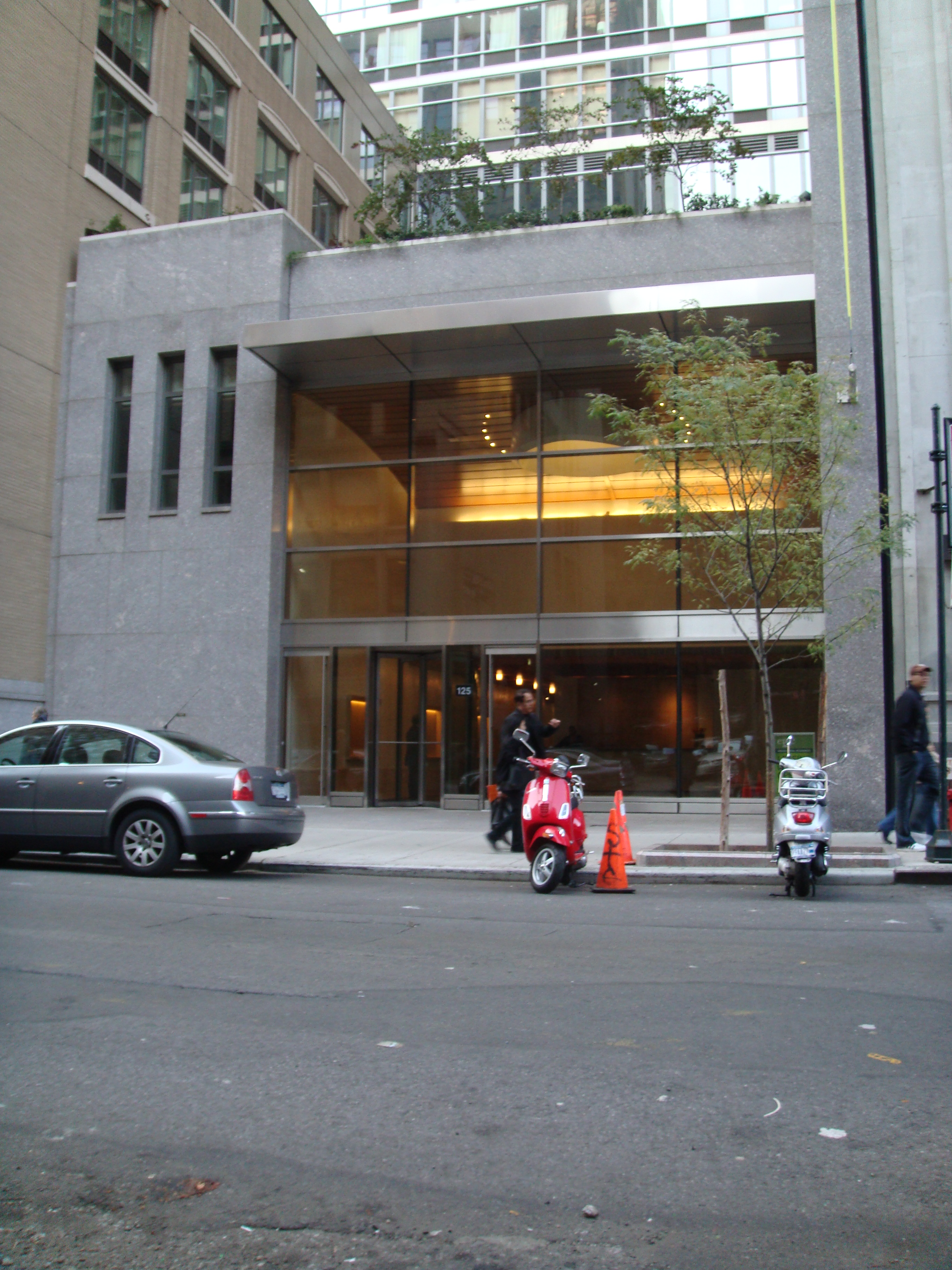
Entrance

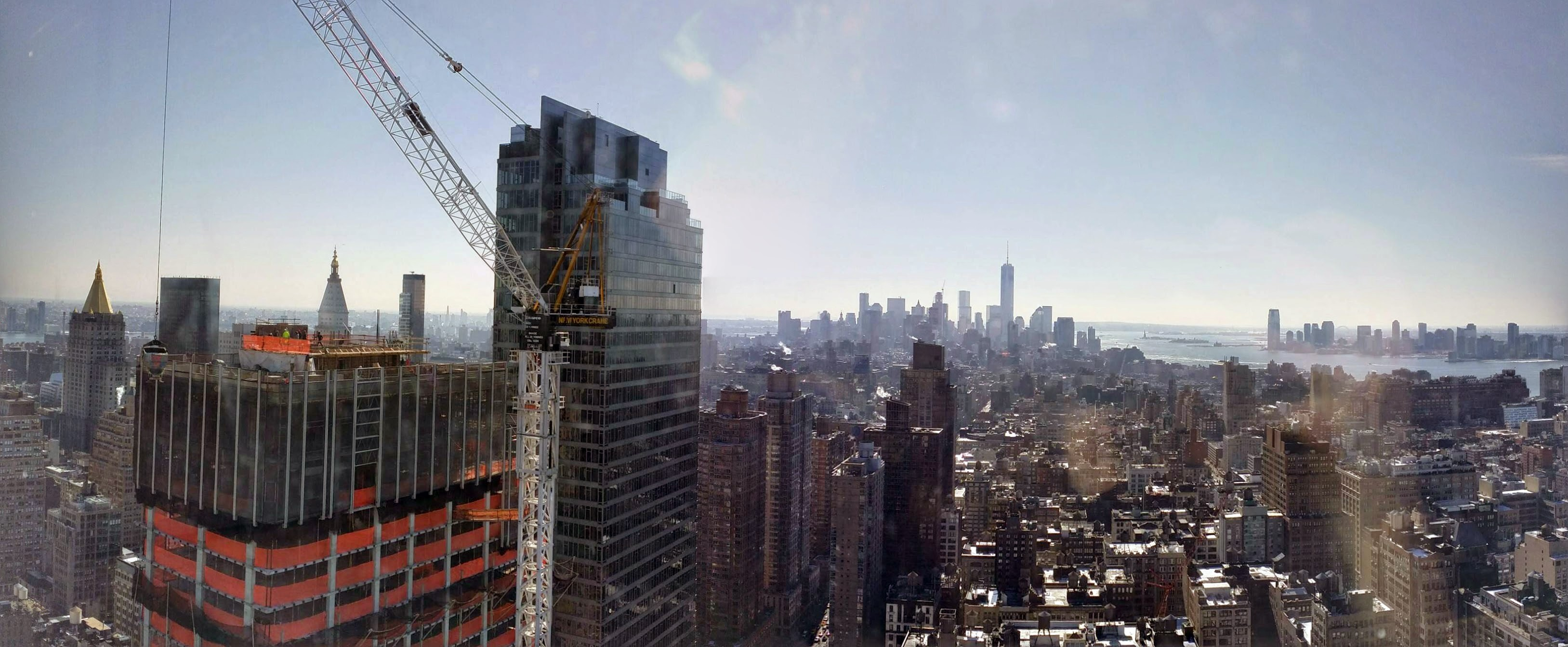
The view from the 53rd floor facing south

== See also ==
- List of tallest buildings in New York City
