= Samuel A.A. Levine =

New York City Commissioner of the Department of Consumer and Worker Protection (2026-)

- Levine in 2022

Commissioner of the New York City Department of Consumer and Worker Protection
- Incumbent
- Assumed office January 1, 2026
- Mayor: Zohran Mamdani
- Preceded by: Vilda Vera Mayuga

Personal details
- Party: Democratic
- Education: Washington University; Harvard Law School (JD)

Samuel A.A. Levine is an American attorney and consumer protection professional who currently serves as the Commissioner of the New York City Department of Consumer and Worker Protection, a role he has held since 2026. He previously served as Director of the Federal Trade Commission Bureau of Consumer Protection from 2021 to 2025.

== Biography ==
Levine attended Washington University in St. Louis before attending Harvard Law School, where he earned his JD and led efforts to challenge illegal foreclosures. He then clerked for Judge Milton Shadur in Illinois and served as an Assistant Attorney General of the state. He received the Gary Bellow Public Service Award from Harvard Law.

He then worked as a staff attorney in the Federal Trade Commission Midwest Office and as an attorney-advisor to Commissioner Rohit Chopra. Under Chair Lina Khan, he became Director of the Federal Trade Commission Bureau of Consumer Protection, which he began in 2021 and left in January 2025. In this role, he was described as having developed a reputation for targeting even violations that would previously have been let slide and utilizing laws that had long been left unused. He also worked on the prevention of trapped subscriptions and opposed facial recognition software, including a suit against Rite Aid. In a speech to the Consumer Data Industry Association, he criticized the data broker industry, many members of which were in the audience.

He was named a Senior Fellow of the Center for Consumer Law and Economic Justice at the University of California, Berkeley in March 2025. In August 2025, he testified regarding what he stated were harms emerging technology could pose to consumer privacy and personal information.

Levine speaks with delivery workers during a break in a New York City Council hearing on micromobility devices Sept. 30 2026, in his capacity as Commissioner of the New York City Department of Consumer and Worker Protection.

On December 22, 2025, then-New York City Mayor-elect Zohran Mamdani announced Levine would be becoming the Commissioner of the New York City Department of Consumer and Worker Protection, citing his "track record of achievement and... agenda of imagination". He assumed this role in January 2026. In this role, Levine vowed more aggressive actions against deceptive business practices. A list he set forth of his priorities by the end of 2026 included preventing ghost jobs, supporting immigrants and renters, and reducing junk fees. He also banned hidden hotel fees and has worked on tipping in delivery. He has been described as taking a broad view of the power in the department.

He has received criticism from business leaders, including the Partnership for New York City, DoorDash, and Uber Eats. He has called loyalty programs tools for surveillance pricing. He has described the "notice and choice" system of data collection as a system that does not work well in the digital age.
