= Jane Hoffman =

US public policy expert

Jane S. Hoffman
- Born: July 28, 1967 (age 59)
- Education: Northwestern University; London School of Economics
- Occupations: Author, policy expert
- Spouse: Michael (m. 1995)
- Children: 1

Jane S. Hoffman (born July 20, 1964) is an American public policy expert and author on consumer affairs and the environment, and, most recently, on big tech companies and private data. She has served many roles in government and civics, including at the United Nations and New York City and state governments.

== Early life ==
Hoffman grew up in Llewellyn Park, New Jersey, the daughter of David Steiner and Sylvia Steiner, a Jewish affairs power couple. Her father is a real estate developer, owner of Steiner Studios (the largest movie studio complex in the eastern United States), and was president of the American Israel Public Affairs Committee, among other communal roles. She has two sisters and one brother.

Hoffman graduated with a B.S. in communication from Northwestern University, where she was later a trustee. She also studied labor relations at the London School of Economics.

== Career ==
Hoffman worked as a Salomon Brothers analyst, and as a show producer for Cable News Network, before switching to a public career. She worked for the United Nations where coordinated events with the New York City government, followed by a complementary position as New York City deputy commissioner to the United Nations at the start of the Giuliani administration. She then moved to the city's Department of Consumer Affairs, spending three years as assistant commissioner, before being appointed its commissioner in 2000 for the remainder of Giuliani's term in office.

In 2002, Hoffman ran for Lieutenant Governor of New York State. She was a leading contender for the position, but abandoned the campaign for health reasons. Later, she ran New York State's reform program for public authorities and was on city commissions for public advocacy and cultural affairs.

In 2007, Hoffman founded a private civic organization, the Presidential Forum on Renewable Energy. It brought focus to sustainability and conservation, and sponsored a presidential debate.

In 2008, she and her husband wrote Green: Your Place in the New Energy Revolution, an environmental book proposing a United States renewable energy policy. The book was excerpted in Scientific American. Publishers Weekly called it an "accessible and surprisingly entertaining, ... informed overview."

In 2020, Hoffman was made fellow of Harvard University's Advanced Leadership Initiative and served as a senior fellow for 2021 and 2022. She served as co-chair of gender equity for the fellows. She is a trustee or director of many civic institutions.

In September 2020, Hoffman penned an op-ed for the New York Daily News titled Put your money where your anti-racist mouth is: Creating a social inequality index.

In April 2022, Post Hill Press published her second book, Your Data, Their Billions: Unraveling and Simplifying Big Tech, which explains how websites use and sell everyday tech users' data and how they can protect themselves from major tech companies.

== Personal life ==
She married Michael Hoffman, an investment banker with The Blackstone Group, on October 28, 1995. New York City Mayor Rudolph Giuliani performed the ceremony, together with Rabbi Daniel Cohen, at the Metropolitan Club.
