= Jeffrey Mullan =

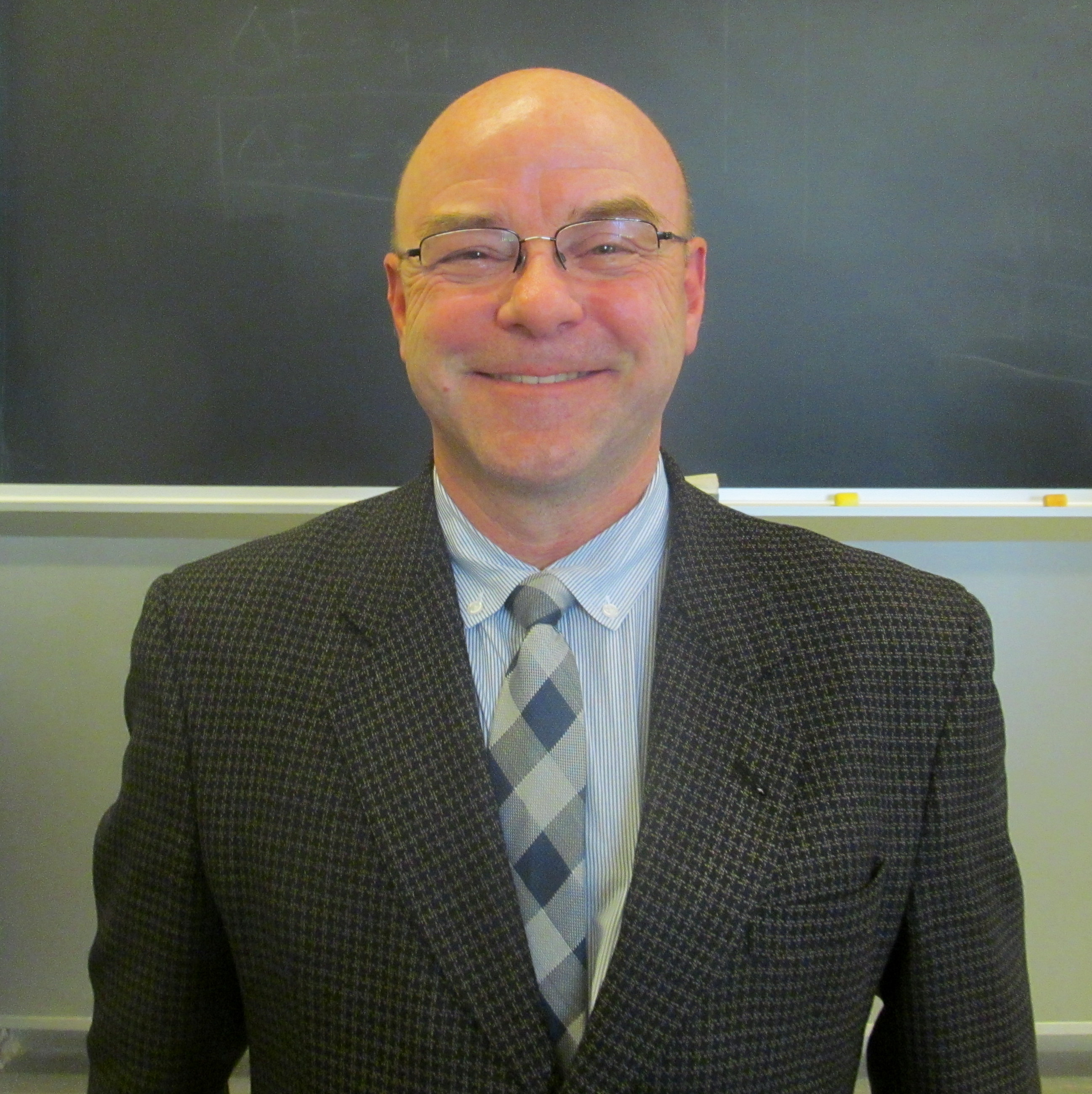
- Mullan in 2017

Massachusetts Secretary of Transportation
- In office 2009–2011
- Preceded by: Jim Aloisi
- Succeeded by: Richard A. Davey

Personal details
- Education: University of Massachusetts Amherst; Suffolk University School of Law
- Occupation: Attorney; State cabinet secretary

Jeffrey B. Mullan is an American attorney and political figure who served as the Massachusetts Secretary of Transportation from 2009 to 2011.

== Early life ==
A native of Worcester, Massachusetts, Mullan graduated from St. John's High School the University of Massachusetts Amherst in 1983. He began working for the state two years later.

== Big Dig ==
In 1988, he was hired by the Massachusetts Department of Public Works as the Department's Right of Way Manager for the Central Artery/Tunnel Project (commonly known as the Big Dig). While working for the DPW, Mullan attended Suffolk University School of Law at night.

== Foley Hoag ==
From 1993 to 2008, Mullan worked for Foley Hoag, where he was a partner and the co-chair of the firm's administrative law practice.

== Return to state government ==
In 2007, Mullan returned to state government as Undersecretary, Chief Operating Officer, and General Counsel of the Department of Transportation and Public Works.

In 2009, he was named Executive Director of the Massachusetts Turnpike Authority. In this position he helped integrate the functions of Turnpike Authority into the existing state highway structure.

=== Secretary of Transportation ===
Later that year, Governor Deval Patrick chose Mullan to serve as the Secretary of the newly consolidated Department of Transportation. Mullan was the first person to serve jointly as transportation secretary and chief executive of the Department of Transportation. He was also responsible for integrating the department into four divisions.

In 2011, Mullan came under fire after it was revealed that he did not inform Governor Patrick that a 110-pound light fixture in the Thomas P. O'Neill Jr. Tunnel fell onto the roadway until more than five weeks had passed.

On July 14, 2011 Mullan announced that he would step down as transportation secretary before the end of the year. He was succeeded by MBTA General Manager Richard A. Davey on September 1, 2011.
