= Massachusetts Department of Transportation =

Government agency in Massachusetts, United States

Massachusetts Department of Transportation (MassDOT)

Agency overview
- Formed: November 1, 2009; 16 years ago
- Preceding agency: Massachusetts Executive Office of Transportation; MassHighway; Massachusetts Registry of Motor Vehicles; Massachusetts Aeronautics Commission; Massachusetts Turnpike Authority; Massachusetts Bay Transportation Authority
- Jurisdiction: Massachusetts
- Headquarters: 10 Park Plaza, Boston, Massachusetts, U.S.
- Agency executives: Phillip Eng, Interim Secretary of Transportation; Jonathan Gulliver, Undersecretary of Transportation; Highway Administrator; Joseph Beggan, Ilyas Bhatti, Richard Dimino, Lisa Iezzoni, Timothy King, Thomas Koch, Dean Mazzarella, Tom NcGee, Vanessa Otero, board of directors
- Website: mass.gov/orgs/massachusetts-department-of-transportation

The Massachusetts Department of Transportation (MassDOT) oversees roads, public transit, aeronautics, and transportation licensing and registration in the US state of Massachusetts. It was created on November 1, 2009, by the 186th Session of the Massachusetts General Court upon enactment of the 2009 Transportation Reform Act.

== History ==
In 2009, Governor Deval Patrick proposed merging all Massachusetts transportation agencies into a single Department of Transportation. Legislation consolidating all of Massachusetts' transportation agencies into one organization was signed into law on June 26, 2009. The newly established Massachusetts Department of Transportation (MASSDOT) assumed operations from the existing conglomeration of state transportation agencies on November 1, 2009.

This change included:

- Creating the Highway Division from the former Massachusetts Turnpike Authority and Massachusetts Highway Department (MassHighway).
- Assuming responsibility for the planning and oversight functions of the Executive Office of Transportation.
- Assuming the functions of both the Massachusetts Aeronautics Commission and the Registry of Motor Vehicles.
- Replacement of the MBTA's board of directors with the DOT's board of directors and removal of the budget veto from the MBTA Advisory Board (of municipalities).
- Assuming responsibility for the Tobin Bridge from Massport.
- Assuming responsibility for non-pedestrian bridges from the Department of Conservation and Recreation.

== Leadership ==
As an executive department the state secretary of transportation is appointed by the governor of Massachusetts and also servies as the chief executive officer of the department. The governor also appoints a five-person board of directors which approves major decisions. The department directly administers some operations, while others remain semi-autonomous.

On October 16, 2025 Monica Tibbits-Nutt announced she would step down as Secretary of Transportation and agreed to continue through the end of the year as a transportation advisor before returning to the private sector. At a press conference the same day, Governor Healey named Phillip Eng as interim Secretary of Transportation and Jonathan Gulliver as his Undersecretary. Eng holds titles as both Secretary of Transportation and General Manager of the MBTA simultaneously.

Name	Term	Appointed By
James Aloisi Jr.	2009–2009	Deval Patrick
Jeffrey Mullan	2009–2011	Deval Patrick
Richard A. Davey	2011–2014	Deval Patrick
Frank DePaola (inteirm)	2014–2015	Deval Patrick
Stephanie Pollack	2015–2021	Charlie Baker
Jamey Tesler	2021–2023	Charlie Baker
Gina Fiandaca	2023–2023	Maura Healey
Monica Tibbits-Nutt	2023–2025	Maura Healey
Phillip Eng (interim)	2025–Current	Maura Healey

== Organization ==
=== Highway Division ===
- Made up of the former state entities MassHighway and the Massachusetts Turnpike Authority.
- Interstate Highways, state highways, and the Massachusetts Turnpike. (Some portions of numbered state routes are owned and maintained by cities and towns).
- Toll bridges and tunnels: the Tobin Bridge (transferred from MassPort on January 1, 2010), Sumner Tunnel, Callahan Tunnel, Ted Williams Tunnel, and the O’Neill Tunnel.
- All vehicular bridges in Department of Conservation and Recreation (DCR) parks are also either owned and maintained by DOT or scheduled to be transferred following completion of DCR work on them by the end of 2014. MassDOT took over the following urban roadways formerly under the DCR: McGrath and O'Brien Highways in Cambridge and Somerville, the Carroll Parkway portion of the Lynnway in Lynn, Middlesex Avenue in Medford, and Forest Hills Overpass ("Msgr. William Casey Highway overpass") (Jamaica Plain), Columbia Road (South Boston), Gallivan Boulevard (Dorchester), and Morton Street, all in Boston.
- MassDOT Highway Division operates out of six district offices as well as their headquarters based in Boston. Each district office is responsible for construction supervision, engineering support, and maintenance within their respective jurisdiction.

District	Office Location	Cities/Towns
1	Lenox	Adams, Alford, Ashfield, Becket, Blandford, Buckland, Charlemont, Cheshire, Chester, Chesterfield, Clarksburg, Colrain, Conway, Cummington, Dalton, Egremont, Florida, Goshen, Granville, Great Barrington, Hancock, Hawley, Heath, Hinsdale, Huntington, Lanesborough, Lee, Lenox, Middlefield, Monroe, Monterey, Montgomery, Mount Washington, New Ashford, New Marlborough, North Adams, Otis, Peru, Pittsfield, Plainfield, Richmond, Rowe, Russell, Sandisfield, Savoy, Sheffield, Shelburne, Stockbridge, Tolland, Tyringham, Washington, West Stockbridge, Williamsburg, Williamstown, Windsor, Worthington
2	Northhampton	Agawam, Amherst, Athol, Barre, Belchertown, Bernardston, Brimfield, Chicopee, Deerfield, East Longmeadow, Easthampton, Erving, Gill, Granby, Greenfield, Hadley, Hampden, Hardwick, Hatfield, Holland, Holyoke, Leverett, Leyden, Longmeadow, Ludlow, Monson, Montague, New Braintree, New Salem, Northampton, Northfield, Orange, Palmer, Pelham, Petersham, Phillipston, Royalston, Shutesbury, South Hadley, Southampton, Southwick, Springfield, Sunderland, Templeton, Wales, Ware, Warren, Warwick, Wendell, West Brookfield, West Springfield, Westfield, Westhampton, Whately, Wilbraham, Winchendon
3	Worcester	Acton, Ashburnham, Ashby, Ashland, Auburn, Ayer, Bellingham, Berlin, Blackstone, Bolton, Boxborough, Boylston, Brookfield, Charlton, Clinton, Douglas, Dudley, Dunstable, East Brookfield, Fitchburg, Framingham, Franklin, Gardner, Grafton, Groton, Harvard, Holden, Holliston, Hopedale, Hopkinton, Hubbardston, Hudson, Lancaster, Leicester, Leominster, Littleton, Lunenburg, Marlborough, Maynard, Medfield, Medway, Mendon, Milford, Millbury, Millis, Millville, Natick, North Brookfield, Northborough, Northbridge, Oakham, Oxford, Paxton, Pepperell, Princeton, Rutland, Sherborn, Shirley, Shrewsbury, Southborough, Southbridge, Spencer, Sterling, Stow, Sturbridge, Sudbury, Sutton, Townsend, Upton, Uxbridge, Wayland, Webster, West Boylston, Westborough, Westford, Westminster, Worcester
4	Arlington	Amesbury, Andover, Arlington, Bedford, Belmont, Beverly, Billerica, Boxford, Burlington, Carlisle, Chelmsford, Concord, Danvers, Dracut, Essex, Everett, Georgetown, Gloucester, Groveland, Hamilton, Haverhill, Ipswich, Lawrence, Lexington, Lincoln, Lowell, Lynn, Lynnfield, Malden, Manchester-By-The-Sea, Marblehead, Medford, Melrose, Merrimac, Methuen, Middleton, Nahant, Newbury, Newburyport, North Andover, North Reading, Peabody, Reading, Revere, Rockport, Rowley, Salem, Salisbury, Saugus, Somerville, Stoneham, Swampscott, Tewksbury, Topsfield, Tyngsborough, Wakefield, Waltham, Wenham, West Newbury, Wilmington, Winchester, Woburn
5	Taunton	Abington, Acushnet, Aquinnah, Attleboro, Avon, Barnstable, Berkley, Bourne, Brewster, Bridgewater, Brockton, Carver, Chatham, Chilmark, Cohasset, Dartmouth, Dennis, Dighton, Duxbury, East Bridgewater, Eastham, Easton, Edgartown, Fairhaven, Fall River, Falmouth, Foxborough, Freetown, Gosnold, Halifax, Hanover, Hanson, Harwich, Hingham, Holbrook, Hull, Kingston, Lakeville, Mansfield, Marion, Marshfield, Mashpee, Mattapoisett, Middleborough, Nantucket, New Bedford, Norfolk, North Attleborough, Norton, Norwell, Norwood, Oak Bluffs, Orleans, Pembroke, Plainville, Plymouth, Plympton, Provincetown, Raynham, Rehoboth, Rochester, Rockland, Sandwich, Scituate, Seekonk, Sharon, Somerset, Stoughton, Swansea, Taunton, Tisbury, Truro, Walpole, Wareham, Wellfleet, West Bridgewater, West Tisbury, Westport, Whitman, Wrentham, Yarmouth
6	Boston	Boston, Braintree, Brookline, Cambridge, Canton, Chelsea, Dedham, Dover, Milton, Needham, Newton, Quincy, Randolph, Watertown, Wellesley, Weston, Westwood, Weymouth, Winthrop

=== Registry of Motor Vehicles Division ===
Formerly an independent state entity, which until 1992 even had its own uniformed police force for vehicular traffic law enforcement, the Registry of Motor Vehicles Division is now directly administered by MassDOT. It is the equivalent of the department of motor vehicles in most states, and processes driver's licenses and motor vehicle registrations.

=== Rail and Transit Division ===
All public transportation agencies are administered independently. Until July 2015, the MassDOT board of directors had served as the board of directors for the Massachusetts Bay Transportation Authority (MBTA), the major provider of public transportation in the Greater Boston area, when its governance of the MBTA was suspended by the state legislature and temporarily replaced by a separate Fiscal and Management Control Board (FMCB) appointed by Massachusetts Governor Charlie Baker. In June 2021, the FMCB was dissolved, and the following month, Baker signed into law a supplemental budget bill that included a provision creating a permanent MBTA Board of Directors and Baker appointed the new board the following October.

The remaining 15 public transit authorities are called Regional Transit Agencies (RTAs), and they provide public bus services in the remainder of the state. The regional transit authorities are:

- Berkshire Regional Transit Authority
- Brockton Area Transit Authority
- Cape Ann Transportation Authority (Boston MPO)
- Cape Cod Regional Transit Authority
- Franklin Regional Transit Authority
- Greater Attleboro Taunton Regional Transit Authority
- Lowell Regional Transit Authority
- Martha's Vineyard Transit Authority
- Merrimack Valley Regional Transit Authority
- MetroWest Regional Transit Authority (Boston MPO)
- Montachusett Regional Transit Authority
- Nantucket Regional Transit Authority
- Pioneer Valley Transit Authority
- Southeastern Regional Transit Authority
- Worcester Regional Transit Authority

The regional transit authorities shown in italics above are within MBTA's commuter rail service area, and provide connections to MBTA trains.

DOT retains oversight and statewide planning authority, and also has a Rail section within the Mass Transit Division. Intercity passenger trains are operated by the federally owned Amtrak, and freight rail is privately operated.

MassDOT is a member of the Northeast Corridor Commission.

=== Aeronautics Division ===
The Aeronautics Division, formerly the Massachusetts Aeronautics Commission, administers state financing of its airports; inspects and licenses airports and landing pads; registers aircraft based in Massachusetts as well as aircraft dealers, regulates airport security, safety, and navigation; and is responsible for statewide aviation planning. The Department of Transportation does not own any airports; the state-owned airports are controlled by the independent Massachusetts Port Authority (which shares its headquarters with the Aeronautics Division).

Government regulation of aviation in the United States is dominated by the Federal Aviation Administration. Airline passenger and baggage screening is provided by the federal Transportation Security Administration, but airport security is provided locally.

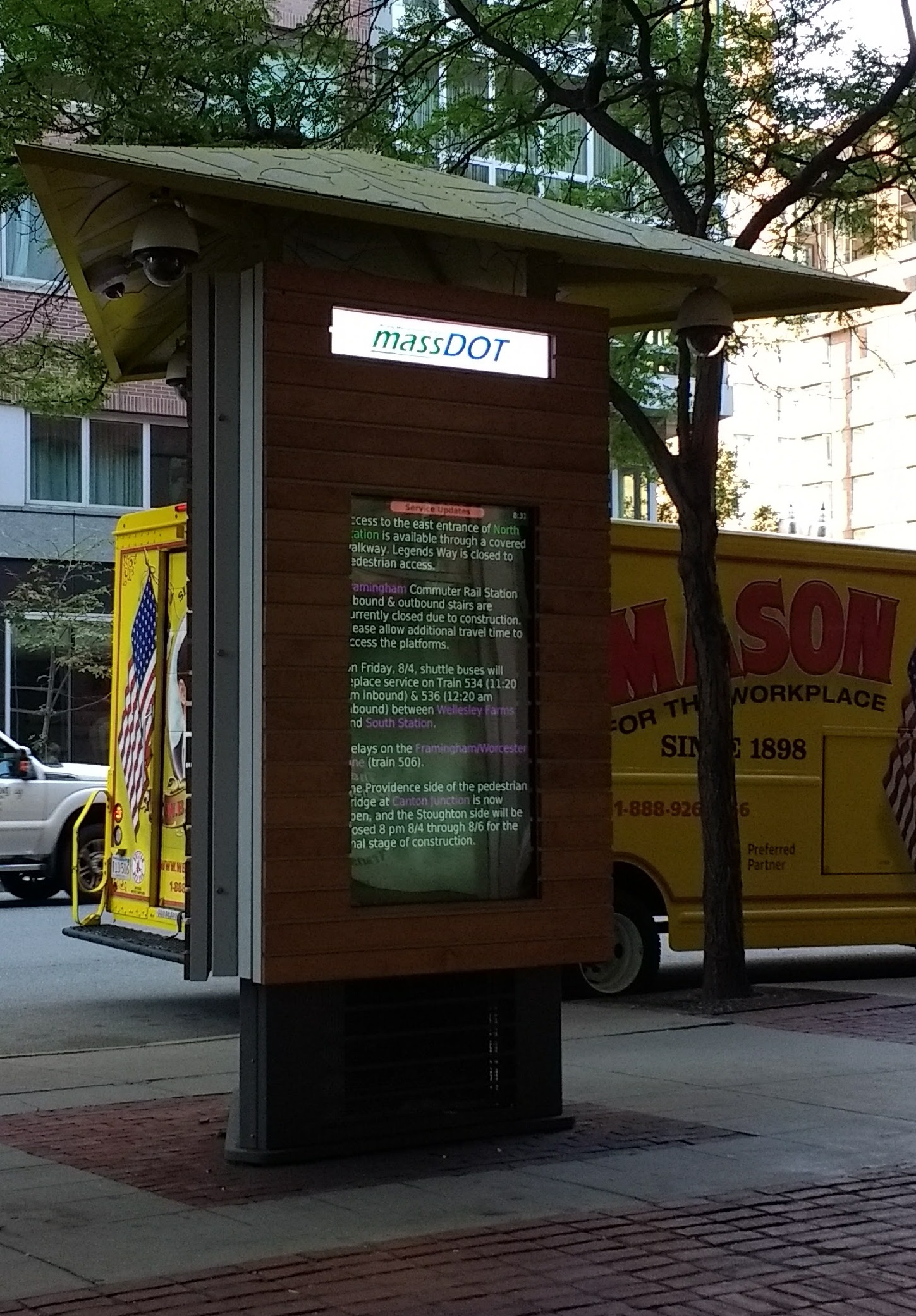
The MassDOT kiosk outside the Park Plaza headquarters

=== Other groups ===
The 2009 reform law also created within MassDOT:

- Office of Planning and Programming, providing centralized administrative services
- Office of Transportation Planning
- Office of Performance Management and Innovation
- Internal Special Audit Unit
- Healthy Transportation Compact, including the Secretary of Transportation, the Secretary of Health and Human Services, the Secretary of Environmental Affairs, the Administrators of the Highway Division and the Transit Division, and the Commissioner of Public Health.
- Real Estate Appraisal Review Board within the Highway Division – 3 to 5 people appointed by the governor
- Office of Transition Management (temporary)
- Workforce Retraining Initiative, serving employees displaced by the merger:
- Public–Private Partnership Infrastructure Oversight Commission – an independent commission of 7 people, with 4 appointed by the governor, and one each appointed by the President of the Senate, Speaker of the House, and State Treasurer.

== Other Massachusetts transportation agencies ==
=== Massachusetts Port Authority ===
The Massachusetts Port Authority (Massport) remains independent from the Department of Transportation, but the Secretary of Transportation serves on the Massport board of directors. Massport owns and operates the maritime Port of Boston, Boston's Logan International Airport, Hanscom Field and Worcester Regional Airport, which was transferred from the City of Worcester in 2010.

=== Steamship Authority ===
The Woods Hole, Martha's Vineyard and Nantucket Steamship Authority regulates all ferry services to and from the islands of Martha's Vineyard and Nantucket, and also operates its own passenger, vehicle, and freight ferries. The Authority has an effective monopoly on car ferry service, but private companies operate various passenger routes.

== State transportation funding ==
Transportation funding available to the state and its agencies include:

- Multi-year federal transportation bill (most recently Moving Ahead for Progress in the 21st Century Act); revenue comes from federal gas tax and general funds)
- Massachusetts gas tax revenues
- Dedicated MBTA revenues (sales tax, municipalities, fares, parking, advertising, real estate leases)
- Regional Transit Authority fares and assessments from municipalities
- Turnpike, tunnel, and bridge tolls (restricted to spending on the tolled asset)
- Parking and airport-related fees for Massport
- RMV registration fees
- General funding from Commonwealth of Massachusetts taxes
- Accelerated Bridge Program ($3 billion 2009–2016)

The statewide budget included $919 million for transportation in FY2009, not including $797M in sales tax revenue dedicated to the MBTA.

Local cities and towns also receive vehicle excise tax revenues, and levy property taxes. Both state and municipal agencies can levy fines for parking and traffic violations.

Article 78 (LXXVIII) of the Massachusetts Constitution says all motor vehicle fees and taxes (except registration excise tax in lieu of property tax), including fuel taxes, must be spent on transportation, including roads, mass transit, traffic law enforcement, and administration. Transportation is thus a net recipient of general state funds.

== Capital planning ==
Massachusetts has 10 regional metropolitan planning organizations:

- Berkshire
- Pioneer Valley
- Central Massachusetts
- Montachusett
- Merrimack Valley
- Northern Middlesex
- Boston Region
- Old Colony
- Southeastern Massachusetts
- Cape Cod

and three non-metropolitan planning organizations covering the remainder of the state:

- Franklin
- Martha's Vineyard Commission
- Nantucket

By law, all federal transportation grants must be allocated by the responsible MPO. Statewide planning and coordination of MPOs is handled by the Department of Transportation.

Massachusetts Transportation Capital Planning Documents
Acronym	Name	Responsible agency	Horizon
STIP	State Transportation Improvement Program	DOT	3 years
TIP	(Regional) Transportation Improvement Program	13 regional MPOs	3 years
RTP	(Regional) Transportation Plan	13 regional MPOs	~25 years, updated every 4 years
PMT	Program for Mass Transportation	MBTA (by CTPS)	25 years, updated every 5 years
CIP	MBTA Capital Improvement Plan	MBTA	4–5 years
MBP	Massachusetts Bicycle Plan	DOT	25 years
UPWP	Unified Planning Work Program	13 regional MPOs	1 year
MMS or CMS	Mobility Management System or Congestion Management System	13 regional MPOs	4 years?
SRP	State Rail Plan	State DOT	Not specified

State Transportation Improvement Program
Collects all 13 regional TIPs plus statewide projects for state and federal transportation and environmental review. Required for federal funding, financially constrained. Approved by FHWA, FTA, and EPA.
(Regional) Transportation Improvement Program
Approve road and transit projects of regional scale for federal funding based on transportation and environmental criteria. Determine consistency with federal air quality goals. MPO approval required for federal funding; plan must be fiscally constrained. TIP projects come from RTP projects and immediate needs. Each project has an "advocate" agency to oversee planning and implementation, file for federal funding, and provide local funding match.
(Regional) Transportation Plan
Financially unconstrained listings and evaluation of regional road and transit projects. Required for federal funding. Projects are added to the RTP from public input, from CMS/MMS recommendations, and by government agencies. In Boston, transit projects are filtered through the MBTA PMT and two RTAs.
Program for Mass Transportation
Identify and evaluate public transit projects in the MBTA service area. Financially unconstrained. Required by state law.
MBTA Capital Improvement Plan
Actually approve projects for MBTA funding. 100% state and federally funded projects are also noted, as are anticipated federal matching funds subject to outside approval. Fiscally constrained.
Massachusetts Bicycle Plan
Identify bicycle access capital improvement projects, coordinate statewide bicycle policies and programs.
Unified Planning Work Program
A list of transportation studies to be conducted by the MPO. Required for federal funding.
Mobility Management System or Congestion Management System
Identify and measure congested corridors; recommend solutions. Required for federal funding.
State Rail Plan
Identify rail projects with the best return on investment, fulfill federal requirements.

CTPS is the Central Transportation Planning Staff, which is the staff of the Boston MPO and with which the MBTA contracts for planning assistance.

The Highway Division accepts submissions for projects from its district offices and municipalities.

=== Accelerated Bridge Program ===
The Accelerated Bridge Program is a bond bill signed into law by Governor Deval Patrick in August 2008, a year after the I-35W Mississippi River bridge collapse put the state's bridges in the spotlight. The $3 billion, 8-year accelerated bridge program will replace and rehabilitate around 270 bridges statewide. 300–500 additional bridges will be preserved to prevent further deterioration. As of September 1, 2015, the program has reduced the number of structurally deficient bridges to 408, from 543 in 2008. The program is paid for using bonds in anticipation of future federal transportation grants to be issued to the state.

Following the conclusion of the APB, the number of bridges in structurally deficient condition has seen a renewed increase. According to 2025 National Bridge Inventory data, Massachusetts maintains 5,311 bridges with 501 currently rated in poor condition.

The MassDOT has called the Accelerated Bridge Program the "Laboratory of Innovation". Engineers on each project are invited to investigate other options to replace the bridges faster and more efficiently to reopen the bridges to traffic faster. Some of these options for the projects are:

- Design/build (e.g. I-495 Lowell)
- Prefabricated girders
- Prefabricated deck panels (e.g. I-495 Lowell)
- Prefabricated substructure
- Heavy lift of a slide-in bridge (e.g. Route 2 Phillipston)
- Float-in bridge (e.g. Craigie Drawbridge)
- Modular bridges (e.g. I-93 Medford)
- "Bridge in a backpack" was used to rebuild a bridge over the Scott Reservoir Outlet in Fitchburg for $890,480. With this technique, lightweight composite tubes are carried into place by several workers on foot (instead of by truck, crane, or heavy equipment) and then the weather-resistant tubes are filled with concrete.
- Bridges constructed in a single phase with traffic detoured (instead of a temporary bridge and multiple phases)

As of September 2015, there were 198 active or completed contracts, including replacement or repair of the following bridges (some of which span multiple contracts):

- Longfellow Bridge major overhaul – $267 million
- Fore River Bridge in Quincy – $245 million
- Fall River – Braga Bridge – $141 million
- Kenneth F. Burns Bridge over Lake Quinsigamond – $89 million rehab
- I-93 bridges in Medford – $74 million
- Casey Overpass – replacement with at-grade intersections – $40 million
- Craigie Drawbridge replacement – $40 million
- Lowell – Replacement of six bridges along I-495 – $34 million
- Neponset River Bridge carrying Route 3A (phase 2 only) – $34 million
- Anderson Memorial Bridge rehab – $20 million
- Boston University Bridge rehab – $18 million
- McCarthy Overpass of the McGrath Highway temporary repairs – $11 million
- Westminster – Route 2 over Route 140 bridge replacement – $11 million
- Storrow Drive Tunnel rehab – $10 million
- Bowker Overpass rehab – $6 million

== See also ==
- Massachusetts State Highway System
