= John F. O'Halloran =

Executive Director of Massachusetts Port Authority
- In office 1959–1963
- Preceded by: Position created
- Succeeded by: Edward J. King

Personal details
- Born: Charlestown, Boston, Massachusetts
- Died: May 25, 1968 (aged 54) Norwell, Massachusetts
- Education: Boston University; Harvard Business School

John F. O'Halloran was an American seaport operations executive who served as the first director of the Massachusetts Port Authority.

== Early life ==
O'Halloran was born in Charlestown. He attended Boston Public Schools, Boston University, and Harvard Business School.

== Seaport career ==
O'Halloran began his career in 1922 as a messenger and worked his way up the ranks. During World War II he organized a system of cargo control for the Boston Port of Embarkation which was copied by other ports throughout the United States. In 1948 he was named general manager of Tidewater Terminal, Inc. From 1955 to 1957 O'Halloran served as the director of the Port of Boston, the predecessor of the Massachusetts Port Authority. From 1957 to 1959, O'Halloran was the executive vice president of Wiggins Terminals, Inc., which operated piers in Charlestown, and general manager of Terminal Operators, which leased and managed the piers at the South Boston Army Base. From 1959 to 1963, O'Halloran served as the executive director of the Massachusetts Port Authority. During his tenure with the Massachusetts Port Authority, it began a massive remodeling job of Logan International Airport, which included the redesign and reconstruction of hundreds of acres of buildings, roadways, and taxiways, including the construction of four finger piers and two new terminals. After leaving the Massachusetts Port Authority, O'Halloran served as president of Port Terminals, Inc.

== Death ==
O'Halloran died unexpectedly on May 25, 1968, while visiting his son in Norwell, Massachusetts. He was 54 years old.
