= Jennifer Davis Carey =

American government official

Massachusetts Secretary of Elder Affairs
- In office 2003–2007
- Preceded by: Lillian Glickman
- Succeeded by: Mike Festa

Massachusetts Director of Consumer Affairs and Business Regulation
- In office 1999–2003
- Preceded by: Daniel Grabauskas
- Succeeded by: Beth Lindstrom

Personal details
- Education: Harvard-Radcliffe; Harvard Graduate School of Education

Jennifer Davis Carey is an American government official who was Massachusetts Secretary of Elder Affairs from 2003 to 2007.

== Education ==
Carey graduated from Harvard and Radcliffe Colleges in 1978 with a bachelor's degree in psychology. She went on to earn a doctoral degree in administration and planning in social policy from the Harvard Graduate School of Education.

== Education career ==
Carey began her career at Ohio University, where she was an assistant dean. From 1982 to 1992, she was the senior admissions and financial aid officer at Harvard and Radcliffe Colleges. From 1992 to 1998, she worked as the director of college counseling at the Bancroft School.

== Government career ==
In 1998, Carey joined the administration of Governor Paul Cellucci as a special assistant to the governor. In this role, she oversaw constituent services and external relations. From 1999 to 2003, she was director of the Office of Consumer Affairs and Business Regulation, where she acted as a consumer advocate and co-ordinated nine state regulatory agencies.

=== Secretary of Elder Affairs ===
On December 19, 2002, Governor-elect Mitt Romney announced that Carey would be his Secretary of Elder Affairs. Carey stepped down as Elder Affairs Secretary on May 30, 2007, to become director of training and education at the University of Massachusetts Medical School's Commonwealth Medicine division.
