= Jane Willis =

American attorney

Jane Willis, a partner at Ropes & Gray, served as co-head of the Litigation and Enforcement practice, and then became a member of the firm's Policy Committee in 2019. She is a graduate of Phillips Exeter Academy. She received her undergraduate degree from Harvard University in Applied Mathematics in 1991, and graduated from Harvard Law School in 1994. In school, she had a reputation as a mathematical whiz, and was recruited into the MIT Blackjack Team. The book Bringing Down the House and the film 21 are based upon the team's success. Willis is portrayed as a character named "Jill" in both the book and film.

As a lawyer, Willis has twenty years of experience representing clients in complex business litigation and antitrust matters, including business disputes and class actions. As a part of her antitrust practice, Willis has represented many of the firm's clients in mergers and acquisitions subject to antitrust merger review and investigation by the U.S. Department of Justice Antitrust Division and the Federal Trade Commission. Willis has been interviewed for her litigation and antitrust experience by various publications including The Wall Street Journal, Fortune, Legal Times, Competition Law360, Modern Healthcare, Reuters and Bloomberg News Services.

== Recognition ==
Willis is recognized nationally as a top antitrust attorney. The researchers at Chambers USA have ranked Willis as one of America's Leading Lawyers for Business for nearly 20 years.

== Personal life ==
Willis is married to former Massachusetts Secretary of Transportation, Richard A. Davey, who also held the position of President of the New York City Transit Authority from 2022 to 2024.

== Notes and references ==
Notes

References

- Shanahan, Mark (March 25, 2008). "Count her out". The Boston Globe.
- Weiss, Debra Cassens (May 1, 2008). "Ropes & Gray Partner Was Blackjack Winner Portrayed in '21'". ABA Journal.
- Sack, Jessica Van (13 August 2010). "Wife of MBTA chief leads lawsuit over Fenway project". Boston Herald.
