= Jeffry Picower =

American lawyer

- Born: Jeffry M. Picower; May 5, 1942; New York City, U.S.
- Died: October 25, 2009 (aged 67); Palm Beach, Florida, U.S.
- Education: Pennsylvania State University (BA); Columbia University (MBA); Brooklyn Law School (JD)
- Occupations: Investor, lawyer, accountant
- Known for: Being the biggest beneficiary of Bernard Madoff's Ponzi scheme
- Spouse: Barbara Picower

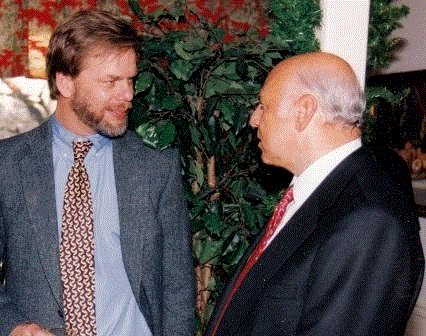
Jeffry Picower (right)

Jeffry M. Picower (May 5, 1942 – October 25, 2009) was an American investor involved in the Madoff investment scandal. He was the largest beneficiary of Madoff's Ponzi scheme, and his widow agreed to have his estate settle the claims against it by Madoff trustee Irving Picard for $7.2 billion, the largest single forfeiture in American judicial history.

== Business dealings ==
Picower was born into a Jewish family in the Bronx, New York. He was a certified public accountant and lawyer, but made most of his fortune by investing with Madoff.

As an accountant at Laventhol & Horwath in the 1980s, Picower set up questionable tax shelters. When the IRS challenged their validity, one of Picower's clients sued him and the firm. The case was settled out of court.

In 1983, Picower was rebuked by the U.S. Securities and Exchange Commission for late disclosure of his greater than 5% position in a company involved in a merger.

In 1991, Picower and Anthony Cerami established a charity, the Picower Institute for Medical Research, with an initial endowment of $10 million. Researchers there, led by Kevin J. Tracey, made a potentially valuable discovery, with possible applications in the treatment of rheumatoid arthritis, Crohn's disease, and multiple sclerosis. It was spun off into a for-profit company, Cytokine Networks, which was later merged with privately held PharmaSciences to form Cytokine PharmaSciences. However, it was revealed that Picower owned 76% of PharmaSciences stock and actually controlled 86.2%, putting him in a conflict of interest in the merger negotiations.

After Physician Computer Network, Inc., went bankrupt, Picower, the chairman of the board and 45% shareholder, had to give $21 million to other shareholders in 2000 after it was discovered that company executives had falsified financial statements.

Alaris Medical Systems, 65% owned by Picower, was taken over by Cardinal Health in 2004 for $1.6 billion.

Picower was listed by Forbes magazine as one of the 400 richest people in the United States for 2009, his only time on the list. Forbes, which listed Picower at no. 371, placed his net worth at $1 billion, though the magazine acknowledged that he was "likely worth billions more."

== Involvement with Bernard Madoff ==
The Jeffry M. and Barbara Picower Foundation was created in 1989 by Picower and his wife Barbara. Barbara Picower was listed as Executive Director and trustee, with both Picowers being members of the board of directors. Longtime friend Bernard Madoff managed foundation assets listed at over $1 billion. It distributed over $268 million in grants to various American organizations, including Human Rights First and the New York Public Library. In 2002, it granted $50 million to the Massachusetts Institute of Technology neuroscience research center, which was subsequently renamed the Picower Institute for Learning and Memory. However, the Picower Foundation was forced to close in 2009 due to losses arising from the uncovering of Madoff's Ponzi scheme.

It was reported that between December 1995 and December 2008, Picower and his family withdrew "from their various Madoff accounts $5.1 billion more than they invested."

In June 2009, Irving Picard, the trustee liquidating Madoff's assets, filed a lawsuit against Picower in the U.S. Bankruptcy Court for the Southern District of New York (Manhattan), seeking the return of $7.2 billion in profits, alleging that Picower and his wife Barbara knew or should have known that their rates of return were "implausibly high", with some accounts showing annual returns ranging from 120% to more than 550% from 1996 through 1998, and 950% in 1999. According to a June 28, 2009, MSNBC article, that would make Picower and his wife the biggest beneficiaries of Madoff's scam, exceeding even Madoff himself. The Picowers' lawyer, William D. Zabel of Schulte Roth & Zabel, responded that, "They were totally shocked by his fraud and were in no way complicit in it." Madoff has suggested that Picower was allowed to remain as a client because he was "the Ponzi equivalent of a bank too big to fail: an investor too big to fire." It would have been impossible for Madoff to find enough cash to completely redeem his multi-billion-dollar account.

On November 1, 2009, an additional court filing by Irving Picard documented an apparently fraudulent gain benefiting Picower. "According to the new filing, Mr. Picower opened an account with Mr. Madoff on April 18, 2006, by wiring a check for $125 million, more than a quarter of the entire sum he invested with Mr. Madoff over time. Within two weeks, the $125 million deposit had purportedly grown to $164 million because of a dramatic ‘gain’ on the securities held in the account—all of which supposedly had been purchased three months earlier ... Five months later, Mr. Picower withdrew his original $125 million, leaving $81 million in the account. There is no legitimate explanation for these events nor any possibility that they escaped Picower’s notice."

== Death and settlement ==
On October 25, 2009, Jeffry Picower died at his Palm Beach home. Picower's wife Barbara told dispatchers she found him "at the bottom of their swimming pool" at their oceanfront estate shortly after noon. He was taken to Good Samaritan Medical Center, where he was pronounced dead about 80 minutes later. According to the Palm Beach Police Department, "An autopsy of the body of Jeffry M. Picower was performed this morning. The Palm Beach County Medical Examiner's Office determined that Mr. Picower suffered a massive heart attack while in the swimming pool resulting in accidental drowning." He was buried on October 27, 2009, in Mount Ararat Cemetery in Farmingdale, New York.

On December 17, 2010, it was announced that a settlement of $7.2 billion had been reached between Irving Picard and Barbara Picower, Picower's widow, the executor of the Picower estate, to resolve the Madoff trustee suit, and repay losses in the Madoff fraud. It was the largest single forfeiture in American judicial history. "Barbara Picower has done the right thing," US Attorney Preet Bharara said.

In 2011, Barbara Picower resumed her philanthropic activities, setting up a new foundation called the JPB Foundation with assets that remained from Jeffry Picower's estate following the legal settlement. Forbes reported that the foundation was established with a $1.2 billion endowment. As of 2018, the JPB Foundation had over $3.7 billion in total assets. According to Foundation Center's list of the largest grant-making foundations, the JPB Foundation was the 24th-largest foundation by asset size in the nation. Barbara Picower currently serves as the President and Director of the JPB Foundation.
