= Richard A. Davey =

American attorney and transportation executive

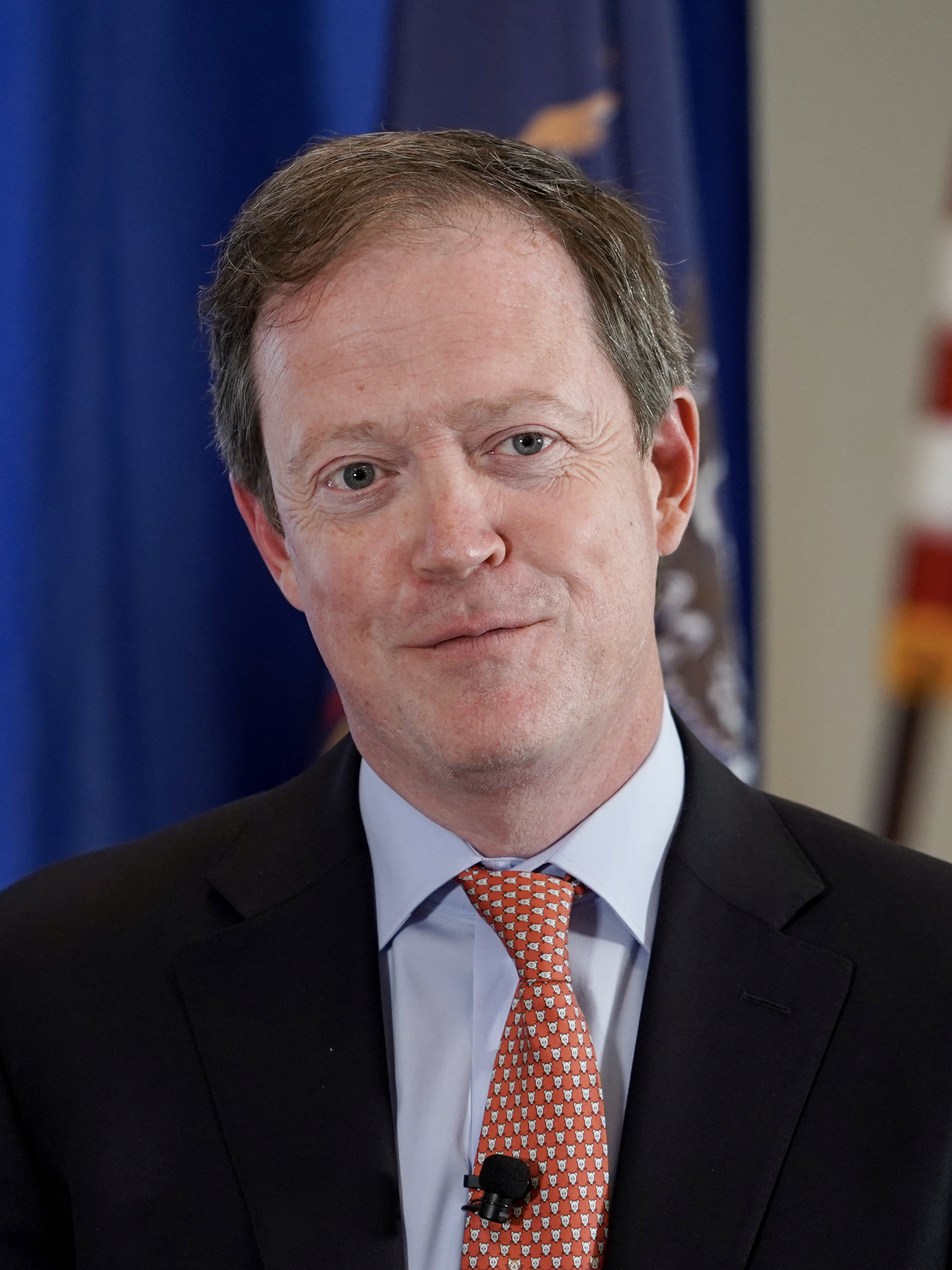
- Davey at a press conference at MTA Headquarters on 5 April 2022

CEO of the Massachusetts Port Authority
- Incumbent
- Assumed office August 5, 2024
- Preceded by: Lisa Wieland

President of the New York City Transit Authority
- In office May 2, 2022 – June 13, 2024
- Governor: Kathy Hochul
- Preceded by: Andy Byford
- Succeeded by: Demetrius Crichlow

Secretary of the Massachusetts Department of Transportation
- In office September 1, 2011 – October 31, 2014
- Governor: Deval Patrick
- Preceded by: Jeffrey Mullan
- Succeeded by: Stephanie Pollack

General Manager of the Massachusetts Bay Transportation Authority
- In office 2010–2011
- Governor: Deval Patrick
- Preceded by: Daniel Grabauskas
- Succeeded by: Beverly A. Scott

Personal details
- Spouse: Jane Willis
- Education: College of the Holy Cross (BA); Gonzaga University (JD)
- Occupation: Attorney; Transportation executive

Richard A. Davey is an American attorney and transportation executive who is the CEO of the Massachusetts Port Authority. He was the General Manager of the Massachusetts Bay Transportation Authority from March 2010 to September 2011, Massachusetts Secretary of Transportation from September 2011 to October 2014, and the President of the New York City Transit Authority from 2022 to 2024.

== Early life and career ==
A native of Randolph, Massachusetts, Davey graduated from the College of the Holy Cross with a Bachelor of Arts and earned his Juris Doctor (J.D.), summa cum laude, from the Gonzaga University School of Law.

He began his legal career in 1999 with the United States Department of Justice as a trial attorney for the Immigration and Naturalization Service. Davey later worked for the New York City law firm of Schulte Roth & Zabel.

== Transportation executive ==
In 2002, Davey joined the Massachusetts Bay Commuter Railroad Company, a private company that runs the MBTA Commuter Rail. In July 2003 he was named the MBCR's general counsel and in 2007 was named deputy general manager of the MBCR. In 2008 he was promoted to the general manager's position. In his first full year as general manager, customer complaints went down 40 percent.

Davey left the MBCR in March 2010 when he became the general manager of the Massachusetts Bay Transportation Authority.

On August 4, 2011, Massachusetts Governor Deval Patrick announced that Davey would succeed outgoing Transportation Secretary Jeffrey Mullan on September 1, 2011.

On October 10, 2014, Davey informed Patrick that he would step down as Transportation Secretary, effective October 31. Frank DePaola, MassDOT Highway administrator, would be appointed the acting Transportation Secretary.

After leaving state government, Davey was chief executive of Boston 2024, a non-profit group planning Boston's unsuccessful bid for the 2024 Summer Olympics. Davey was also a partner and associate director at Boston Consulting Group (BCG).

In March 2022, New York City's Metropolitan Transportation Authority announced that Davey would become the president of the New York City Transit Authority in May 2022. The Transit Authority, a division of the Metropolitan Transportation Authority, oversees the city's subways and buses. The MTA announced that Davey would leave in June 2024, to join Massport.

== Personal life ==
Davey is married to Jane Willis, a partner at Ropes & Gray and a former member of the MIT Blackjack Team.
