= Gina Fiandaca =

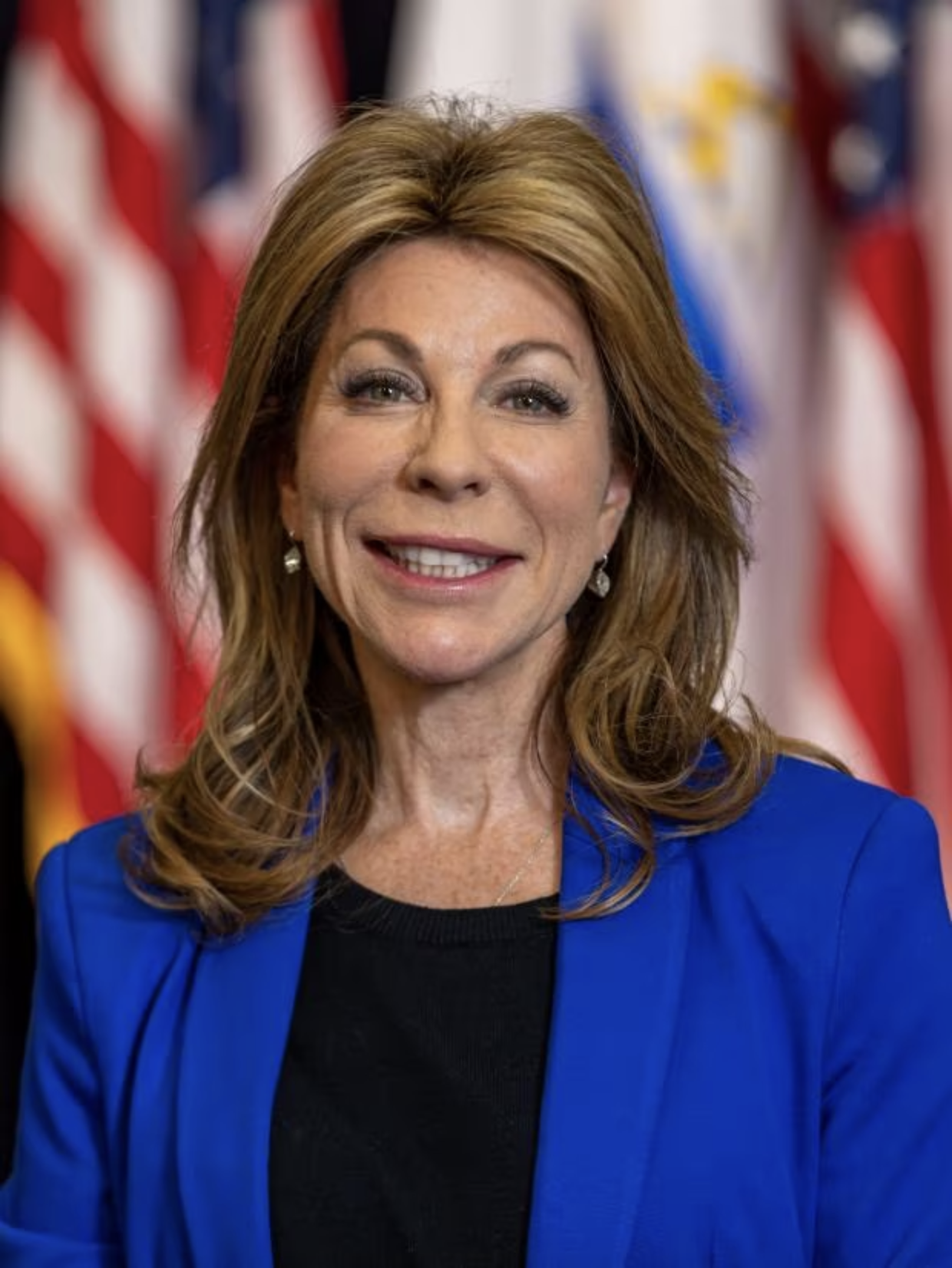

Secretary of the Massachusetts Department of Transportation
- In office January 2023 – September 2023
- Governor: Maura Healey
- Preceded by: Jamey Tesler
- Succeeded by: Monica Tibbits-Nutt

Personal details
- Born: East Boston, Massachusetts, U.S.
- Education: Suffolk University (BS); Boston University (MBA)

Gina Fiandaca is an American government official who served as secretary of the Massachusetts Department of Transportation from January to September 2023.

== Early life and education ==
Fiandaca was born in October, 1964 and raised in East Boston, Massachusetts. She earned a Bachelor of Science degree in business administration from Suffolk University and a Master of Business Administration from Boston University.

== Career ==
From 2006 to 2014, Fiandaca served as director of Boston's Office of the Parking Clerk. From 2015 to 2019, she served as commissioner of the Boston Department of Transportation. In 2019, she became assistant city manager of Austin, Texas. She was appointed by governor Maura Healey to serve as secretary of the Massachusetts Department of Transportation in January 2023. In August 2023 Fiandaca announced she would be resigning from the position effective September 11th for undisclosed reasons, making her the shortest serving appointed secretary.

== Personal life ==
Fiandaca's sister, Cheryl Fiandaca, was married to William Bratton. In May 2023 the MBTA awarded a $900,000 no-bid contract to Teneo, where Bratton works as an executive chairman.
