= James Aloisi =

Lawyer and politician in Massachusetts, USA

Jim Aloisi
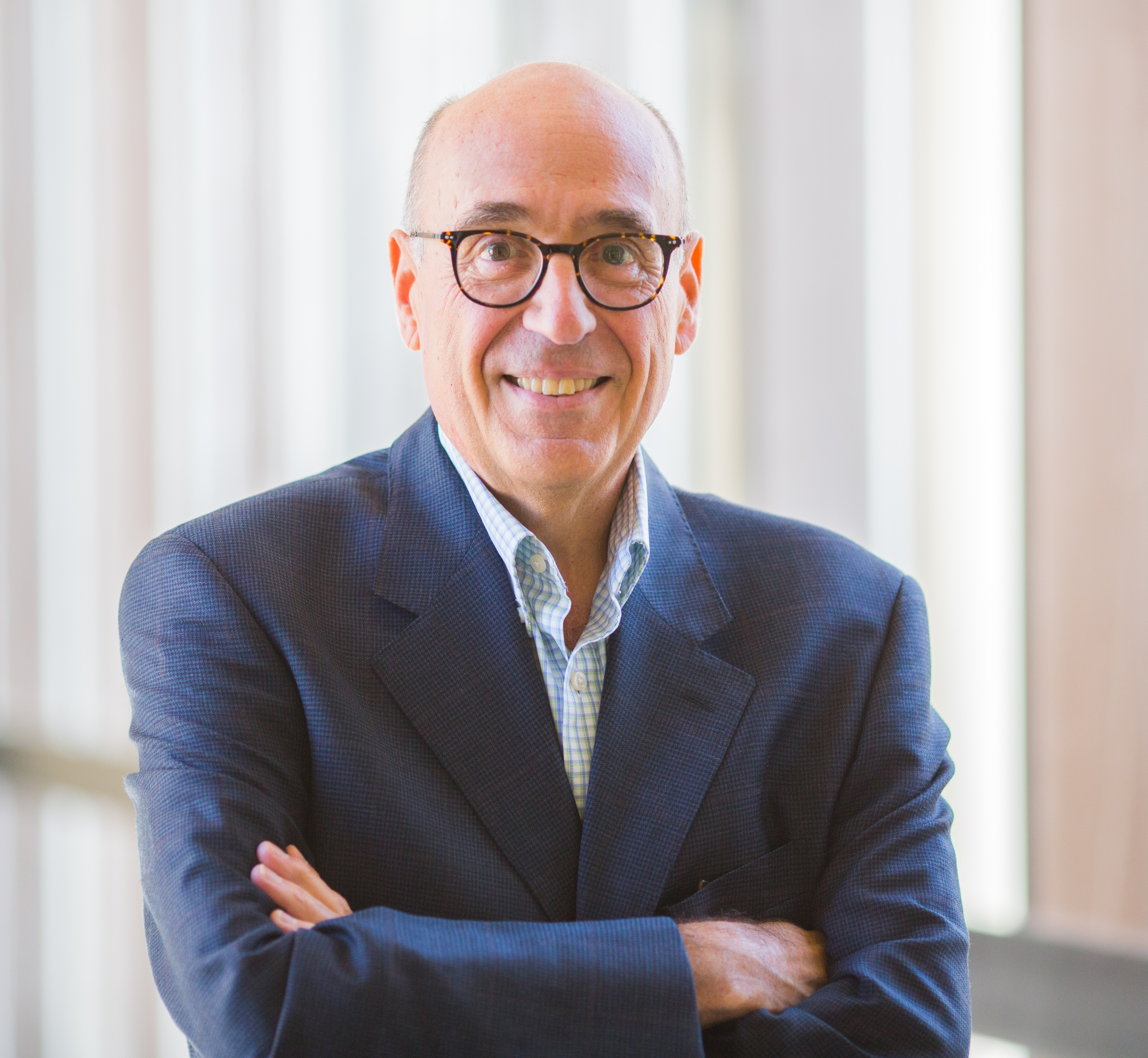
- Aloisi in 2024

Massachusetts Secretary of Transportation
- In office January 2009 – October 2009
- Preceded by: Bernard Cohen
- Succeeded by: Jeff Mullan

Personal details
- Education: Boston College Law School (JD); Harvard University (ALM)
- Occupation: Lawyer; Politician; Author

James A. "Jim" Aloisi Jr. is a Boston-based writer, lawyer and consultant with a specialty in transportation planning and policy. Aloisi is secretary of Boston-based transit policy advocacy group TransitMatters and a lecturer at the MIT Department of Urban Studies and Planning.

Aloisi was an assistant Massachusetts attorney general from 1978 to 1983. He was chief of the Massachusetts Department of Revenue legal bureau from 1983 to 1987, then an assistant state transportation secretary from 1987 to 1989. Aloisi was general counsel of the Massachusetts Turnpike Authority from 1989 to 1996. He was a partner at Hill & Barlow from 1996 to 2002, then moved to Goulston & Storrs in January 2003 when the former firm dissolved. He was on the Emerson College board from 2007 to 2009.

Aloisi was appointed to the Massachusetts Port Authority board by governor Deval Patrick in February 2008. He served as Massachusetts Secretary of Transportation under Patrick from January to October 2009. In 2014, Aloisi formed the consulting firm Pemberton Square Group with Peter Meade. After Meade retired, Aloisi formed Trimount Consulting.

== Writing ==
Aloisi is the author of four books:

- The Big Dig (2004), a history of the Big Dig project
- Magic in the Air: The Times & Life of Boston's Honey Fitz (2007), a biography of John Francis Fitzgerald
- The Vidal Lecture: Sex and Politics in Massachusetts and the Persecution of Chief Justice Robert Bonin (2011), about a 1970s political scandal.
- Massport at 60 (2018), a history of the Massachusetts Port Authority

Aloisi is a regular contributor to Commonwealth Magazine.
