= Peter Hatch (government official) =

American government official (born 1970)

Commissioner of the New York City Department of Consumer and Worker Protection
- In office September 8, 2021 – February 7, 2022
- Mayor: Bill de Blasio; Eric Adams
- Preceded by: Lorelei Salas
- Succeeded by: Vilda Vera Mayuga

Personal details
- Born: Peter A. Hatch
- Education: Columbia University (BA); Harvard Kennedy School (MPA); Fordham University (JD)

Peter A. Hatch is an American government official who served as the Commissioner of New York City Department of Consumer and Worker Protection.

== Biography ==
Hatch graduated from Columbia College in 1992, and received his MPA from Harvard Kennedy School and JD from Fordham University School of Law. He practiced law at Schulte Roth & Zabel in between his stints in public service.

He befriended future mayor Bill de Blasio during Senator John Edwards' 2004 presidential campaign, while Hatch was the deputy state director for New York, and de Blasio co-chair of the New York campaign. Hatch then worked for de Blasio as his chief of staff when he was a councilman. He served as chief of staff to John Edwards' 2008 presidential campaign before being hired by Senator Kirsten Gillibrand as state director for New York in 2010.

In 2014, he joined the de Blasio administration as a senior advisor to the First Deputy Mayor Anthony Shorris.

From 2016 to 2020, he served as chief of staff to the Deputy Mayor for Health and Human Services and concurrently in 2019, a senior advisor to the mayor on homelessness issues. In March 2020, Hatch was named New York City's COVID-19 Public-Private Partnership Czar.

Hatch was named by Bill de Blasio to serve as commissioner of the Department of Consumer and Worker Protection in September 2021.

Hatch currently serves as Deputy Secretary for Human Services and Mental Hygiene for New York State Governor Kathy Hochul.

== Personal life and family ==
Hatch is a native of New York City. He married Hilary Rubenstein, daughter of Philadelphia-based real estate developer Mark Rubenstein, in a 2005 ceremony that was officiated by then-Los Angeles City Councilman Eric Garcetti. His father was a professor of architecture at New Jersey Institute of Technology and his mother an epidemiologist at National Cancer Institute.
