= William D. Zabel =

American lawyer (1936–2026)

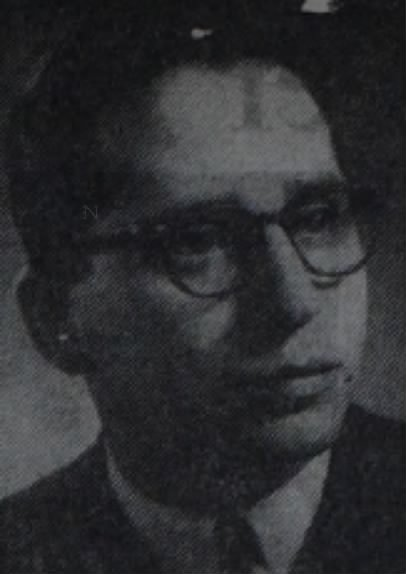
- Zabel in 1964
- Born: William David Zabel; December 14, 1936; Omaha, Nebraska, U.S.
- Died: July 7, 2026 (aged 89); Bedford, New York, U.S.
- Education: Princeton University; Harvard Law School
- Occupation: Lawyer
- Spouse: Deborah Miller
- Children: David Zabel

William David Zabel (December 14, 1936 – July 7, 2026) was an American lawyer.

== Early life and career ==
Zabel was born in Omaha, Nebraska, on December 14, 1936, the son of Louis Zabel, a Russian emigrant, and Anne Rothenberg, a Romanian emigrant. He attended Princeton University, earning his bachelor's degree in 1958. He also attended Harvard Law School, graduating in 1961. After graduating, in the 1960s, he worked as a civil rights lawyer in Mississippi. During his time in Mississippi, he helped expand Black voting rights, and was shot by members of the Ku Klux Klan.

In 1967, Zabel wrote an amicus brief for the American Civil Liberties Union in the landmark U.S. Supreme Court case named Loving v. Virginia, which unanimously ruled that Virginia's ban on interracial marriage was a violation of the Fourteenth Amendment. In 1969, he co-founded Schulte Roth & Zabel, a full service law firm. In the 2010s, he fought for compensation for victims of the Madoff investment scandal, a financial scandal.

== Personal life and death ==
Zabel was married to Deborah Miller. Their marriage lasted until Zabel's death in 2026. His son David Zabel is a television producer and writer.

Zabel died from Parkinson's disease at his home in Bedford, New York, on July 7, 2026, at the age of 89.
