= New York City Department of Consumer and Worker Protection =

Government agency

Department overview
- Formed: April 29, 1969; 57 years ago
- Preceding department: Department of Markets
- Jurisdiction: New York City
- Headquarters: 42 Broadway, Manhattan, New York City, U.S.
- Motto: To protect and enhance the daily economic lives of New Yorkers to create thriving communities.
- Employees: 419 (FY 2026)
- Annual budget: $81.7 million (FY 2026)
- Department executive: Samuel A.A. Levine, Commissioner, Department of Consumer and Worker Protection (DCWP)
- Key document: New York City Charter
- Website: nyc.gov/dcwp

The New York City Department of Consumer and Worker Protection (DCWP) is a department of the government of New York City.

== History ==
The duties were performed by the Commissioner of Public Markets until 1968. Bess Myerson was appointed by Mayor John Lindsay as the first commissioner of the Department for Consumer Affairs in 1969.

In 2019, the agency changed its name from the Department of Consumer Affairs to the Department of Consumer and Worker Protection, expanding its role to enforce paid sick leave laws, fair scheduling practices, and protections for independent contractors.

As of 2026, the department is responsible for the regulation of pedicabs.

== Commissioners ==
Commissioner	Mayor	Took office	Left office	Notes
Bess Myerson	John Lindsay	1969	1973	Was the first commissioner of the DCA-named agency.
Betty Furness	John Lindsay	1973	1973	
Elinor Guggenheimer	Abraham Beame	1974	1977	
Bruce Ratner	Ed Koch	1978	1982	
Simon Gourdine	Ed Koch	1982	1984	
Angelo Aponte	Ed Koch	1984	1989	Served as Commissioner of Department of Housing & Community Renewal under Mario Cuomo
Mark Green	David Dinkins	1990	1993	
Alfred C. Cerullo III	Rudy Giuliani	1994	1996	
Jose Maldonado	Rudy Giuliani	1996	1997	
Jules Polonetsky	Rudy Giuliani	1998	2000	
Jane Hoffman	Rudy Giuliani	2000	2002	
Gretchen Dykstra	Michael Bloomberg	2002	2006	
Jonathan Mintz	Michael Bloomberg	2006	2013	
Julie Menin	Bill de Blasio	2014	2016	
Lorelei Salas	Bill de Blasio	2016	2020	was the first commissioner of the agency as DCWP.
Peter Hatch	Bill de Blasio	2021	2022	
Vilda Vera Mayuga	Eric Adams	2022	2025	
Samuel A.A. Levine	Zohran Mamdani	2026		

== See also ==
- New York City Office of Administrative Trials and Hearings (OATH), for hearings conducted on certain summonses issued by the Department
- New York City Public Advocate
