= Tower 49 =

Office skyscraper in Manhattan, New York

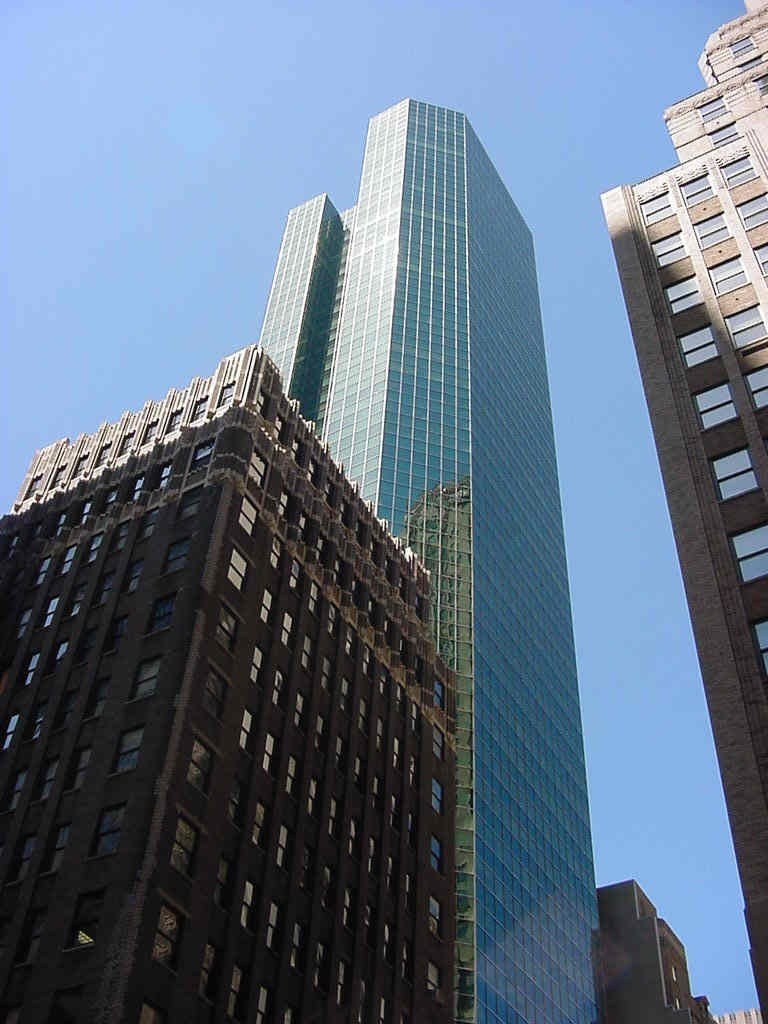
- Tower 49 - Looking southwesterly from Madison Avenue & 49th Street

General information
- Status: Completed
- Type: Office
- Architectural style: Modern
- Address: 8-18 East 49th Street
- Town or city: Midtown Manhattan, New York City
- Country: United States
- Coordinates: 40°45′26″N 73°58′37″W
- Completed: 1985
- Height: 614 feet (187 m)

Technical details
- Floor count: 45

Design and construction
- Architect(s): Skidmore, Owings & Merrill

Website
- http://tower49gallery.com/

Tower 49 is an office skyscraper in the Midtown Manhattan neighborhood of New York City. The lot has frontage on both 48th and 49th Streets between Fifth Avenue and Madison Avenue. The street frontages were offset by about the width of an NYC brownstone lot on both sides.

The firm of Skidmore, Owings and Merrill devised a "simple crystalline form" of two chamfer-cornered masses joined by the central service core and wrapped in blue-tinted mirror glass.

Tenants include the Major League Baseball Players Association and Axis Communications. Tower 49 is one of the few buildings to have a registered trademark symbol as part of its official name.

== Tower 49 Gallery ==
Tower 49 Gallery collaborates with artists on long term exhibitions and will typically invite a curator to organize and write the catalog essay for the exhibition. The concept of the gallery is to give the public a chance to enjoy art, and to display artworks in a space where people are living and working. During the year 2002 Tower 49 displayed 5 large paintings in the lobby by the New York artist Ronnie Landfield.

== Exhibitions ==
- Ronnie Landfield, January 2002 – December 2002
- Jules Olitski, July 2013 – July 2014
- Natvar Bhavsar Rang Rasa, October 7, 2014 – March 12, 2015 | Catalog Essay by Carter Ratcliff
- The Bennington Legacy: Willard Boepple, Isaac Witkin and James Wolfe, April 30 – October 29, 2015 | Co-Curated by Karen Wilkin and Ai Kato
- Big Redux: Friedel Dzubas, November 9, 2015 – April 9, 2016 | Catalog Essay by Patrica Lewy
- Free Fall by Cordy Ryman, May 2017 – April 2018 | Catalog Essay by Thomas Micchelli Co-curated by Thomas Micchelli and Ai Kato
- Strategic Misbehavior by Michele Oka Doner, April 2018 – May 2019 | Catalog Essay by Deborah Rothschild
- Inside Out by Enrico Isamu Oyama, May 2019 – August 2020 | Catalog Essay by Eric Shiner

== See also ==
- Tower 42, London
- List of tallest buildings in New York City
