= Massachusetts Port Authority =

State agency of Massachusetts

- Abbreviation: Massport
- Formation: 1956
- Type: Government agency
- Headquarters: East Boston, Massachusetts, U.S.
- Region served: Massachusetts
- CEO: Richard A. Davey
- Budget: >$800 million
- Staff: 1,300
- Website: massport.com

Massachusetts Port Authority (Massport) is the port authority for the Commonwealth of Massachusetts. It owns and operates three airports, Logan International Airport, Hanscom Field, and Worcester Regional Airport, and public terminals in the Port of Boston.

Massport is a financially self-sustaining public authority whose transportation facilities generate more than $600 million annually; no state tax dollars are used to fund operations or capital improvements at Massport facilities. Its headquarters is located in the Logan Office Center, adjacent to Logan Airport in East Boston, Massachusetts.

== History ==
=== 20th century ===
The Massachusetts Port Authority was created in 1956 by the Massachusetts General Court to replace the locally controlled port commission; however, the Authority was not enabled until 1959, due to delay in bond funding. The Authority is an independent public authority, not a state agency.

In 1966, Castle Island Container Terminal was constructed for Sea-Land Corporation, one of the first intermodal container facilities. In 1971, the Authority constructed a second container port in Charlestown for the use of other shipping companies. In 1980, Sea-Land ended its exclusive lease, and the first container port was enlarged and made available for other shipping companies.

=== 21st century ===
On January 1, 2010, the Tobin Bridge was transferred from the Authority to the new Massachusetts Department of Transportation.

In June 2019, by a vote of 5-to-2, Massport's board of directors selected then current port director Lisa Wieland to serve as the authority's chief executive. She earned a salary of $360,000-a-year and served from September 2019 to 2023.

=== List of executive directors ===
- John F. O'Halloran: 1959–1963
- Edward J. King: 1963–1974
- Edward Hanley (interim): 1974–1975
- David W. Davis: 1975–1982
- Kenneth C. Pearson (interim): 1982–1983
- Lou Nickinello: 1983
- David W. Davis: 1983–1990
- Alden S. Raine: 1990–1993
- Stephen Tocco: 1993–1997
- Peter I. Blute: 1997–1999
- Virginia Buckingham: 2000–2001
- Craig Coy: 2002–2006
- Thomas J. Kinton Jr.: 2006–2011
- David S. Mackey (acting): 2011–2012
- Thomas P. Glynn: 2012–2018
- John Pranckevicius (acting): 2018–2019
- Lisa Wieland: 2019–2023
- Ed Freni (interim): 2023–2024
- Richard A. Davey: 2024–present

On May 29, 2024, the port authority board voted to offer Richard A. Davey the CEO position, which he currently serves.

== Massport facilities ==
=== Airports ===
- Logan International Airport
- Hanscom Field
- Worcester Regional Airport – Formerly owned by the city of Worcester until ownership transfer to Massport was mandated by law in 2009, and subsequently completed on June 22, 2010.

=== Seaports and maritime facilities ===
The Port of Boston includes Cruiseport Boston and facilities in the Boston Marine Industrial Park in South Boston, and others in East Boston and Charlestown:

- Flynn Cruiseport Boston (formerly the Black Falcon Cruise Terminal), One Black Falcon Avenue, South Boston
- Paul W. Conley Terminal, First & Farragut Road, South Boston - Container port
- Boston Autoport, Charlestown - Automobile shipping, leased to private operator.
- The Boston Fish Pier, South Boston - Seafood processing, acquired in 1972.
- Mystic Piers 48,49 and 50, Charlestown - Used for bulk storage and shipping of salt since the 1980s
- Medford Street Terminal, Charlestown - Dock, office, and warehouse areas, purchased in 1986 from Revere Sugar Refinery and Somerville Lumber.
- East Boston Shipyard and Marina - Marginal Street, East Boston - Former Navy and Bethlehem Steel site, equipped for ship repair.
- Massport Marine Terminal (MMT)/North Jetty, South Boston - Used for Big Dig staging, berths now available. Being developed for seafood processing.
- Fargo Street Terminal, South Boston - Storage and support activities
- International Cargo Terminal, 88 Black Falcon Avenue, South Boston - Warehouses and office space

== Transportation services ==
=== Massport Shuttle ===
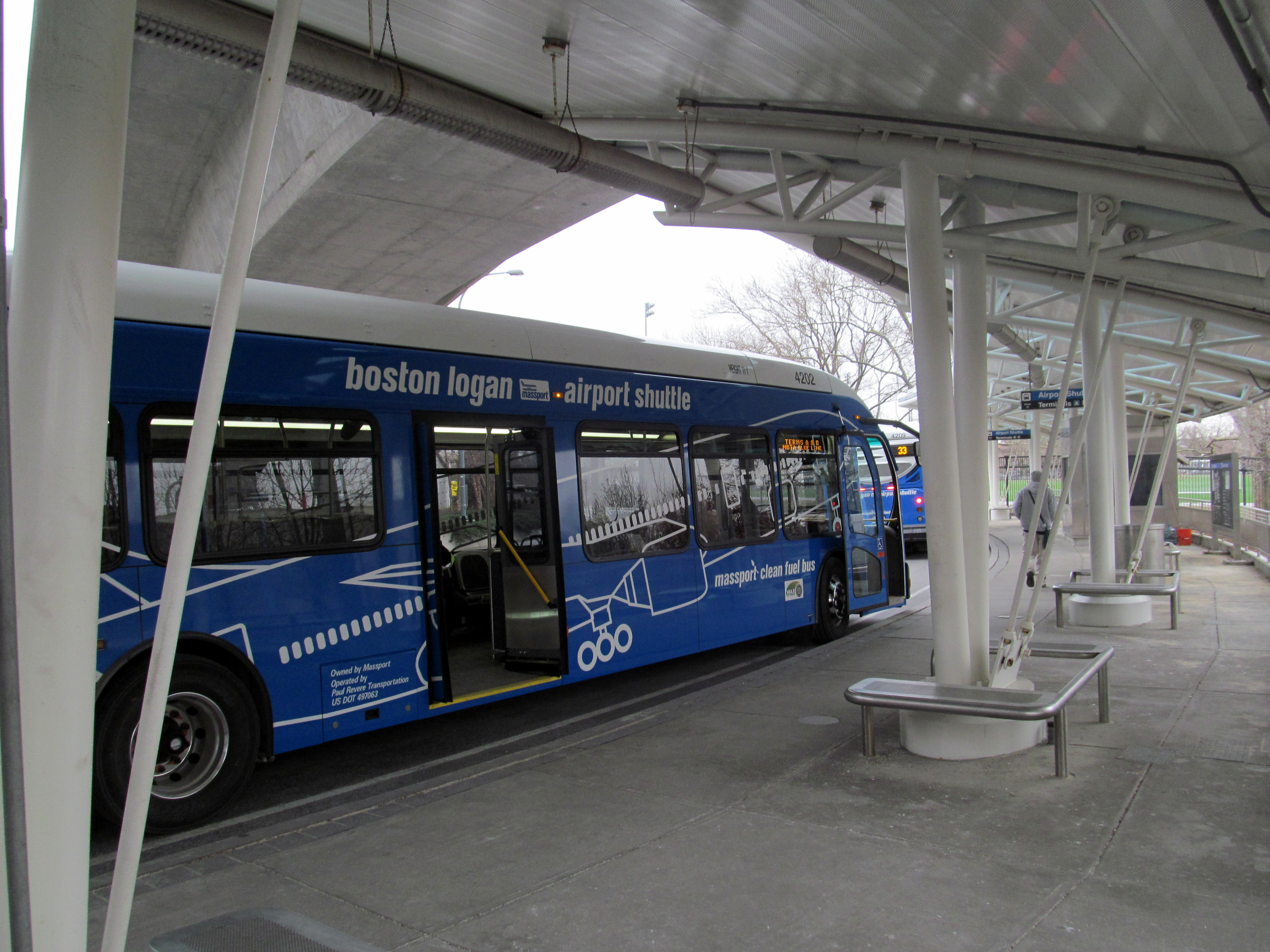
A Logan Airport shuttle bus on route 22, which serves Terminals A and B, in the busway at Airport station

The Massport Shuttle connects all terminals at Boston Logan International Airport to Airport Station on the MBTA Blue Line, as well as the water transportation dock on Harborside Drive and the Rental Car Center.

- Route 11 serves terminals A, B, C and E
- Route 22 serves terminals A and B, subway station and rental car center during peak hours
- Route 33 serves terminals C and E, subway station and rental car center during peak hours
- Route 55 serves all terminals, subway station and rental car center during off-peak hours in the early morning and late evening
- Route 66 serves all terminals, subway station and water transportation dock.
- Route 88 serves all terminals and the economy parking garage, along with the subway station in the inbound direction (from the garage to the terminals)

=== Logan Express ===
Massport also operates Logan Express bus service between all terminals and park-and-ride lots in Braintree (near South Shore Plaza), Framingham (Shopper's World), Woburn (Anderson Regional Transportation Center), and Peabody (164 Newbury Street). In 2014, with the closure of the Government Center subway station, Massport started running a Logan Express to the Hynes Convention Center and Copley Square in the Back Bay neighborhood of Boston. Even after Government Center reopened in 2016, the shuttle service to Back Bay continues to operate, and starting in 2019 riders of that shuttle got priority in the TSA security line.

=== Silver Line ===
Massport provides financial assistance to the MBTA for operation of the Silver Line Bus Rapid Transit service to Logan terminals from downtown Boston, and contributes to the maintenance of Airport Station and ventilation of the Ted Williams Tunnel.

== Public safety ==
=== Massachusetts State Police - Troop F ===
State Police-Troop F patrols and provides primary law enforcement services for all Massachusetts Port Authority owned properties, including but not limited to Boston's Logan International Airport in East Boston, Boston's Seaport District, the Port of Boston, and Seaport Hotel and Seaport World Trade Center. Troop F is a unique force within the Massachusetts State Police. Specialized assets include a dedicated detective unit, a bomb squad, a community services unit, a marine unit and highly trained, federally certified State Police K-9 teams. All the members of Troop F are tasked to ensure compliance with airport security rules and regulations as mandated by both the Federal Aviation Administration (FAA) and the Transportation Security Administration (TSA).

Until 2010, its only barracks was located within the airport. It has since moved to a building on the outskirts, allowing for more space, parking, and better access to the properties.

The Troop F Commander also serves as Massport's Director of Aviation Security.

=== Massport Police ===
The Massachusetts Port Authority maintains its police force of sworn law enforcement officers. They work in seamless partnership with the Massachusetts State Police—Troop F who also provide law enforcement services for Massport. Massport police officers, also known as port officers, are responsible for physical security and law enforcement at the marine terminals, Boston's Seaport District, East Boston parks and various other properties and lands owned by the authority. The Massport Police Department is also responsible for the safety and security of the passengers and vessels that call on the Port of Boston through the Flynn Cruise Port and Paul W. Conley Cargo Container Terminal, in adherence with federal regulations and law enforcement requirements set forth by the Maritime Transportation Security Act of 2002.

The Chief of the Massport Police Department also serves as Massport's Director of Maritime Security.

By state law, under Section 110 of Chapter 205 of the Acts of 1996, municipal police (such as the Boston Police Department) do not have jurisdictional authority on Massport property.

=== Massport Fire Rescue ===
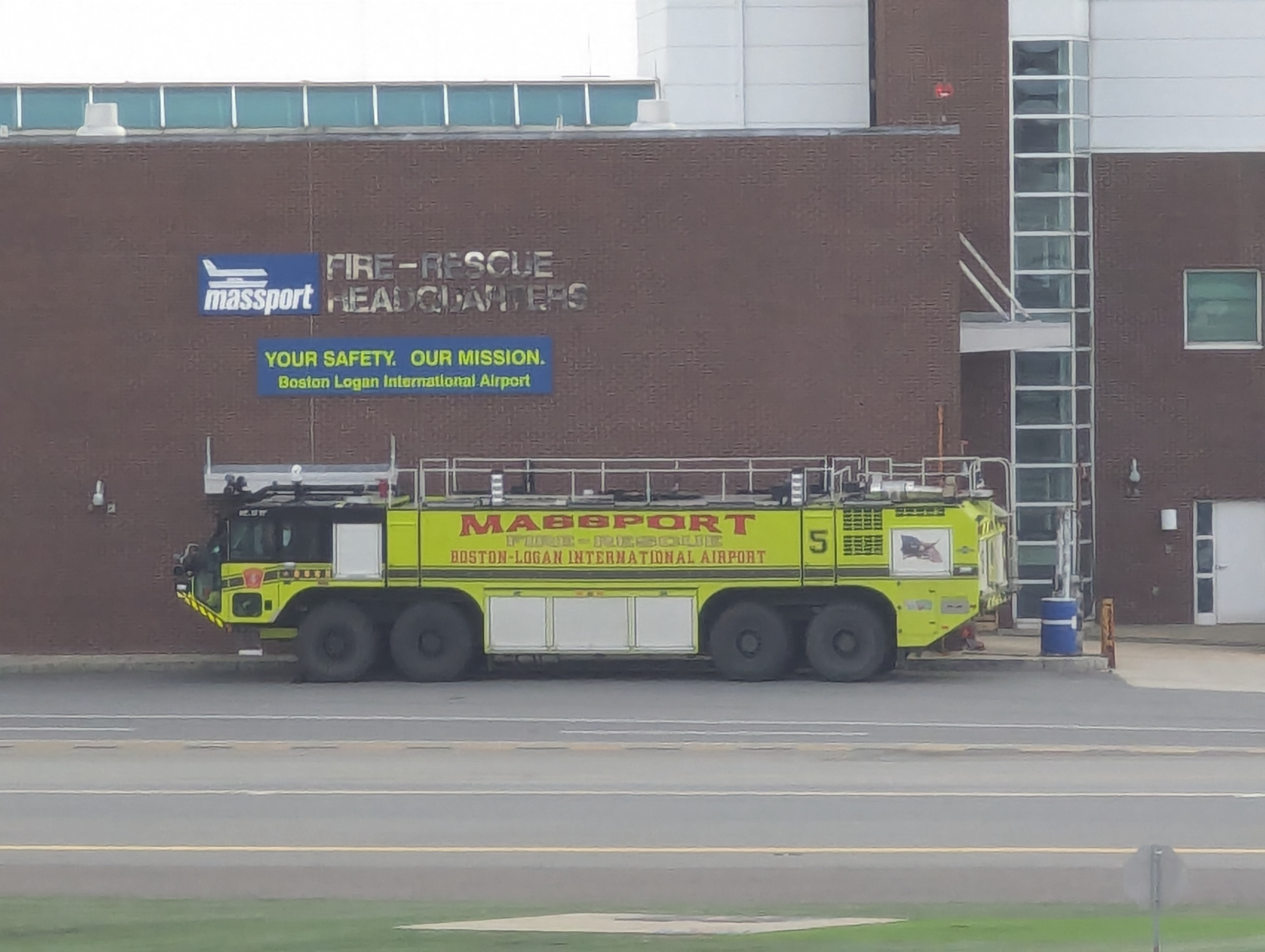
Massport Fire Rescue crash tender outside Massport Fire Rescue HQ

Massport's Fire Rescue responsibilities include aircraft rescue and firefighting, structural fire protection, hazardous materials response, emergency medical services, responding to off-shore emergencies with the Marine division, which includes the 79-foot American United fireboat, as well as fire prevention and inspections. The Fire Rescue headquarters, a Fire Rescue satellite station and a Fire Rescue boat dock (shared with the Massachusetts State Police Troop F / Marine Unit) are all located on Boston Logan International Airport's airfield, while two additional ARFF stations exist at both Laurence G. Hanscom Field and Worcester Regional Airport. Massport Fire Rescue is part of the Massachusetts Metro Fire District and responds to surrounding communities on a mutual aid system.

== See also ==
- Transportation in Boston
- Transportation in Massachusetts
