= 1977 New York Mets season =

1977 New York Mets
- League: National League
- Division: East
- Ballpark: Shea Stadium
- City: New York
- Record: 64–98 (.395)
- Owners: Charles Shipman Payson
- General manager: Joe McDonald
- Managers: Joe Frazier, Joe Torre
- Television: WOR-TV
- Radio: WNEW/WNYC (Ralph Kiner, Lindsey Nelson, Bob Murphy)

The 1977 New York Mets season was the 16th regular season for the Mets, who played home games at Shea Stadium. Initially led by manager Joe Frazier followed by Joe Torre, the team posted a 64–98 record and finished in last place for the first time since 1967, and for the first time since divisional play was introduced in 1969.

== Offseason ==
- March 30, 1977: Benny Ayala was traded by the Mets to the St. Louis Cardinals for Doug Clarey.

== Regular season ==
The 1977 Mets had some promising new players in outfielder Lee Mazzilli and catcher John Stearns, but there was not enough stock in the lineup. The once powerful pitching staff had also taken on a leaner look. By midseason, ace Tom Seaver had been traded, Jerry Koosman was on the way to going 8–20 and Jon Matlack (who would be traded in December) finished 7–15.

=== Managerial change ===
On May 30, after being swept in a doubleheader by the Montreal Expos, the Mets' record fell to 15–30, and Frazier was fired as manager of the Mets. Mets first baseman Joe Torre assumed the role of player-manager, leading his team to a 49–68 record the remainder of the way. The team finished 37 games behind the Philadelphia Phillies in the National League East, narrowly avoiding a 100-loss season (64–98).

Torre was the club's eighth manager and in certain respects his appointment reestablished the New York connection of Mets managers. Although he had spent most of his career with the Milwaukee and Atlanta Braves and the St. Louis Cardinals, Torre had grown up and played his first baseball in Brooklyn. When the thirty-six-year-old Torre retired as a player that June, he left behind a .297 lifetime batting average for his eighteen years in the major leagues, including an MVP season in 1971 when he led the league with a .363 batting average. Torre was an able manager, with a veteran's incisive insights into the game and the ability to handle and motivate players. But in this case, a last-place team was a last-place team no matter how able the manager.

=== "The Midnight Massacre" ===
Seaver was at odds with Met chairman M. Donald Grant all season due to contract disputes. The conflict came to a head two weeks after Torre took over as manager on June 15, when Grant traded Seaver to the Cincinnati Reds for Pat Zachry, Doug Flynn, Steve Henderson and Dan Norman. Dave Kingman was also traded to the San Diego Padres, in return for Bobby Valentine and minor league pitcher Paul Siebert. Somewhat more quietly that day, the Mets also acquired Joel Youngblood from the St. Louis Cardinals for Mike Phillips. To make room for Youngblood on the Mets' active roster, Torre retired as a player.

From a public-relations perspective, the Seaver and Kingman trades were a disaster. Seaver especially was a hard hit to the fan base. As a member of the 1969 World Champions, he was a symbol of past glory, and was still a highly-effective pitcher. Whatever else they might not have had, they still had as their very own the man generally acclaimed as baseball's premier pitcher. No matter how abrasive the relationship between Seaver and his employers had become, dealing him away was a highly unpopular and much-ridiculed move. Shea Stadium was dubbed "Grant's Tomb" in the New York sports pages.

Grant did acquire some good, young talent for Seaver; Flynn was a second baseman who won the NL Gold Glove award in fielding in 1980, Zachry was co-winner of the NL Rookie of the Year award with Butch Metzger the previous season (coincidentally, they would be teammates on the Mets in 1978), and Henderson would come in second place to the Montreal Expos' Andre Dawson for the Rookie of the Year award in 1977.

Dave Kingman was in the final year of his contract, and would have become a free agent at the end of the season unless the club re-signed him. Additionally, his performance in 1977 had been anything but stellar, as evidenced by his .209 batting average at the time of the trade. However, coming on top of the Seaver banishment, along with the minimal return received for their big bruiser, the Kingman trade only added to the growing disenchantment at Shea Stadium. As a result of the trades, June 15, 1977, would forever be known to Mets' fans as "The Midnight Massacre."

=== Season highlights ===
- May 31 - June 16 - In his first 17 games as manager, Joe Torre's Mets went 12–5, a great start that was compared to the Mets 1973 championship run.
- June 7 - Tom Seaver struck out ten Cincinnati Reds in an 8–0 Mets win. It was the last time Seaver struck out 10 or more batters in a Mets uniform.
- July 13 - The Mets trailed the Chicago Cubs 2–1 with one out in the sixth inning when the lights at Shea went out as New York City was stricken with a blackout that would last two days. The game was resumed on September 16, with the Cubs winning 5–2. On July 15, when the lights finally went on in New York, the Mets split a doubleheader with the Pittsburgh Pirates.
- August 21 - Tom Seaver took the mound against the New York Mets for the first time in his career. His Cincinnati Reds defeated the Mets 5–1.

=== Season standings ===
NL East
Team	W	L	Pct.	GB	Home	Road
Philadelphia Phillies	101	61	.623	—	60‍–‍21	41‍–‍40
Pittsburgh Pirates	96	66	.593	5	58‍–‍23	38‍–‍43
St. Louis Cardinals	83	79	.512	18	52‍–‍31	31‍–‍48
Chicago Cubs	81	81	.500	20	46‍–‍35	35‍–‍46
Montreal Expos	75	87	.463	26	38‍–‍43	37‍–‍44
New York Mets	64	98	.395	37	35‍–‍44	29‍–‍54

=== Record vs. opponents ===
1977 National League record Sources:
Team	ATL	CHC	CIN	HOU	LAD	MON	NYM	PHI	PIT	SD	SF	STL
Atlanta	—	5–7	4–14	9–9	5–13	6–6	7–5	2–10	3–9	11–7	8–10	1–11
Chicago	7–5	—	7–5	6–6	6–6	10–8	9–9	6–12	7–11	7–5	9–3	7–11
Cincinnati	14–4	5–7	—	5–13	10–8	7–5	10–2	8–4	3–9	11–7	10–8	5–7
Houston	9–9	6–6	13–5	—	9–9	8–4	6–6	4–8	4–8	8–10	9–9	5–7
Los Angeles	13–5	6–6	8–10	9–9	—	7–5	8–4	6–6	9–3	12–6	14–4	6–6
Montreal	6–6	8–10	5–7	4–8	5–7	—	10–8	7–11	7–11	5–7	6–6	12–6
New York	5–7	9–9	2–10	6–6	4–8	8–10	—	5–13	4–14	6–6	7–5	8–10
Philadelphia	10-2	12–6	4–8	8–4	6–6	11–7	13–5	—	8–10	9–3	9–3	11–7
Pittsburgh	9–3	11–7	9–3	8–4	3–9	11–7	14–4	10–8	—	10–2	2–10	9–9
San Diego	7–11	5–7	7–11	10–8	6–12	7–5	6–6	3–9	2–10	—	8–10	8–4
San Francisco	10–8	3–9	8–10	9–9	4–14	6–6	5–7	3–9	10–2	10–8	—	7–5
St. Louis	11–1	11–7	7–5	7–5	6–6	6–12	10–8	7–11	9–9	4–8	5–7	—

=== Notable transactions ===
- June 7, 1977: Bud Black was drafted by the Mets in the 2nd round of the secondary phase of the 1977 Major League Baseball draft, but did not sign.
- June 14, 1977: Jeff Reardon was signed by the Mets as an amateur free agent.
- June 15, 1977: Tom Seaver was traded by the Mets to the Cincinnati Reds for Pat Zachry, Doug Flynn, Steve Henderson, and Dan Norman.
- June 15, 1977: Mike Phillips was traded by the Mets to the St. Louis Cardinals for Joel Youngblood.
- June 15, 1977: Dave Kingman was traded by the Mets to the San Diego Padres for Bobby Valentine and Paul Siebert.

=== Roster ===
1977 New York Mets
Roster
Pitchers: 34 Bob Apodaca; 45 Rick Baldwin; 39 Nino Espinosa; 31 Roy Lee Jackson; 36 Jerry Koosman; 38 Skip Lockwood; 32 Jon Matlack; 22 Doc Medich; 44 Bob Myrick; 20 John Pacella; 33 Ray Sadecki; 41 Tom Seaver; 43 Paul Siebert; 27 Craig Swan; 30 Jackson Todd; 40 Pat Zachry	Catchers: 15 Jerry Grote; 42 Ron Hodges; 12 John Stearns; Infielders: 19 Luis Alvarado; 23 Doug Flynn; 19 Leo Foster; 3 Bud Harrelson; 17 Félix Millán; 28 John Milner; 5 Mike Phillips; 11 Lenny Randle; 35 Luis Rosado; 2 Roy Staiger; 9 Joe Torre; 1 Bobby Valentine; 18 Joel Youngblood	Outfielders: 4 Bruce Boisclair; 5 Steve Henderson; 26 Dave Kingman; 7 Ed Kranepool; 11 Pepe Mangual; 16 Lee Mazzilli; 33 Dan Norman; 6 Mike Vail	Manager: 55 Joe Frazier; 9 Joe Torre; Coaches: 53 Tom Burgess; 24 Willie Mays; 52 Joe Pignatano; 51 Dennis Sommers; 54 Rube Walker

== Player stats ==
=== Batting ===
==== Starters by position ====
Note: Pos = Position; G = Games played; AB = At bats; H = Hits; Avg. = Batting average; HR = Home runs; RBI = Runs batted in

Pos	Player	G	AB	H	Avg.	HR	RBI
C	John Stearns	139	431	108	.251	12	55
1B	John Milner	131	388	99	.255	12	57
2B	Félix Millán	91	314	78	.248	2	21
SS	Bud Harrelson	107	269	48	.178	1	12
3B	Lenny Randle	136	513	156	.304	5	27
LF	Steve Henderson	99	350	104	.297	12	65
CF	Lee Mazzilli	159	537	134	.250	6	46
RF	Mike Vail	108	279	73	.262	8	35

==== Other batters ====
Note: G = Games played; AB = At bats; H = Hits; Avg. = Batting average; HR = Home runs; RBI = Runs batted in

Player	G	AB	H	Avg.	HR	RBI
Bruce Boisclair	127	307	90	.293	4	44
Doug Flynn	90	282	54	.191	0	14
Ed Kranepool	108	281	79	.281	10	40
Dave Kingman	58	211	44	.209	9	28
Joel Youngblood	70	182	46	.253	0	11
Roy Staiger	40	123	31	.252	2	11
Ron Hodges	66	117	31	.265	1	5
Jerry Grote	42	115	31	.270	0	7
Mike Phillips	38	86	18	.209	1	3
Bobby Valentine	42	83	11	.133	1	3
Leo Foster	36	75	17	.227	0	6
Joe Torre	26	51	9	.176	1	9
Luis Rosado	9	24	5	.208	0	3
Dan Norman	7	16	4	.250	0	0
Pepe Mangual	8	7	1	.143	0	2
Luis Alvarado	1	2	0	.000	0	0

=== Pitching ===
==== Starting pitchers ====
Note: G = Games pitched; IP = Innings pitched; W = Wins; L = Losses; ERA = Earned run average; SO = Strikeouts

Player	G	IP	W	L	ERA	SO
Jerry Koosman	32	226.2	8	20	3.49	192
Nino Espinosa	32	200.0	10	13	3.42	105
Jon Matlack	26	169.0	7	15	4.21	123
Craig Swan	26	146.2	9	10	4.23	71
Pat Zachry	19	119.2	7	6	3.76	63
Tom Seaver	13	96.0	7	3	3.00	72
Roy Lee Jackson	4	24.0	0	2	6.00	13
Doc Medich	1	7.0	0	1	3.86	3

==== Other pitchers ====
Note: G = Games pitched; IP = Innings pitched; W = Wins; L = Losses; ERA = Earned run average; SO = Strikeouts

Player	G	IP	W	L	ERA	SO
Jackson Todd	19	71.2	3	6	4.77	39

==== Relief pitchers ====
Note: G = Games pitched; W = Wins; L = Losses; SV = Saves; ERA = Earned run average; SO = Strikeouts

Player	G	W	L	SV	ERA	SO
Skip Lockwood	63	4	8	20	3.38	84
Bob Apodaca	59	4	8	5	3.43	53
Bob Myrick	44	2	2	2	3.61	49
Rick Baldwin	40	1	2	1	4.45	23
Paul Siebert	25	2	1	0	3.86	20
Ray Sadecki	4	0	1	0	6.00	0
John Pacella	3	0	0	0	0.00	1

== Farm system ==
Level	Team	League	Manager
AAA	Tidewater Tides	International League	Frank Verdi
AA	Jackson Mets	Texas League	Bob Wellman
A	Lynchburg Mets	Carolina League	Jack Aker
A	Wausau Mets	Midwest League	Tom Egan
Short-Season A	Little Falls Mets	New York–Penn League	Chris Krug
