= Paul Siebert =

American baseball player (born 1953)

- Pitcher
- Born: June 5, 1953 (age 73); Minneapolis, Minnesota, U.S.
- Batted: Left Threw: Left

MLB debut
- September 7, 1974, for the Houston Astros

Last MLB appearance
- September 24, 1978, for the New York Mets

MLB statistics
- Win–loss record: 3–8
- Earned run average: 3.77
- Strikeouts: 59
- Stats at Baseball Reference

Teams
- Houston Astros (1974–1976); San Diego Padres (1977); New York Mets (1977–1978)

Paul Edward Siebert (born June 5, 1953) is an American former Major League Baseball pitcher. Paul's father was former major league first baseman Dick Siebert.

The Houston Astros drafted Siebert in the third round of the 1971 Major League Baseball draft (58th overall, 7 ahead of Ron Guidry) out of Edina High School in Edina, Minnesota. He went 36-24 with a 2.86 earned run average over three seasons in Houston's farm system when he received a September call-up in 1974. He started in his major league debut on September 7 against the San Diego Padres, and exited after seven strong innings with a 4-2 lead the bullpen was unable to hold. In his next start, he shutout the San Francisco Giants on four hits. Siebert would not, however, win another game with the Astros. He would not make it out of the second inning in either of his next two starts (losing one), and went 0-2 each of the two following seasons. Just as pitchers and catchers were set to report for Spring training 1977, Siebert was dealt to the Padres for a minor league pitcher.

Siebert began the 1977 season with the triple A Hawaii Islanders, and was up in the majors for less than two weeks when he was part of the infamous "Midnight Massacre" in New York. On June 15, 1977, the Mets traded Dave Kingman to the San Diego Padres for Siebert and Bobby Valentine, sent Tom Seaver to the Cincinnati Reds for Pat Zachry, Doug Flynn, Steve Henderson and Dan Norman, and Mike Phillips to the St. Louis Cardinals for Joel Youngblood.

Siebert split the rest of that year between the Mets and the minor league Tidewater Tides. He was the winning pitcher and scored the winning run in the Mets' seventeen inning extra innings marathon against the Montreal Expos on July 9. Coincidentally, his only other win and final career win also came in extra innings against the Los Angeles Dodgers. He would also split the 1978 season between the Mets and Tidewater, going 0-2 with a 5.14 ERA at the major league level.

Siebert was traded to the St. Louis Cardinals for outfielder Bob Coluccio after the 1978 season, but neither would see any major league experience with his new club. Siebert was released at the end of Spring training 1979. Shortly afterwards, he signed with the Montreal Expos, going 1-3 with a 5.25 ERA for the Denver Bears of the American Association before retiring.

== See also ==
- List of second-generation Major League Baseball players
