= Dave Kingman =

American baseball player (born 1948)

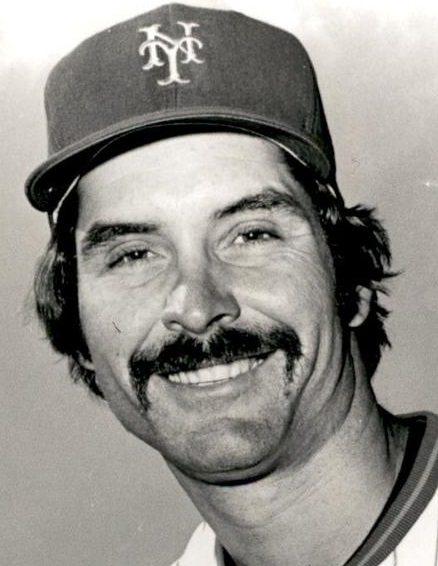
- Kingman with the New York Mets, c. 1981
- Left fielder / First baseman / Designated hitter
- Born: December 21, 1948 (age 77); Pendleton, Oregon, U.S.
- Batted: Right Threw: Right

MLB debut
- July 30, 1971, for the San Francisco Giants

Last MLB appearance
- October 5, 1986, for the Oakland Athletics

MLB statistics
- Batting average: .236
- Home runs: 442
- Runs batted in: 1,210
- Stats at Baseball Reference

Teams
- San Francisco Giants (1971–1974); New York Mets (1975–1977); San Diego Padres (1977); California Angels (1977); New York Yankees (1977); Chicago Cubs (1978–1980); New York Mets (1981–1983); Oakland Athletics (1984–1986)

Career highlights and awards
- 3× All-Star (1976, 1979, 1980); 2× NL home run leader (1979, 1982)

David Arthur Kingman (born December 21, 1948), nicknamed "Kong", "King Kong", and "Sky King", is an American former Major League Baseball left fielder, first baseman, third baseman, and designated hitter who was a three-time MLB All-Star with 442 career home runs and 1,210 runs batted in (RBI) in 16 seasons. In his career, Kingman averaged a home run every 15.11 at bats, tied for 19th best all-time.

The 6' 6" Kingman was a power hitter, who twice led the National League in home runs. Known for his long home runs, Kingman hit one measured at over 530 feet. Kingman struck out frequently, and posted a low batting average and on-base percentage. His 1,816 strikeouts was the fourth-highest total in MLB history at the time of his retirement. Kingman finished in the top 25 voting for National League Most Valuable Player four times (1972, 1975, 1976, and 1979) and American League Most Valuable Player once (1984). Upon retiring, only eighteen other players had more home runs than Kingman for a career and he was tied for 4th on the all-time grand slam list with 16 (tied with Hank Aaron and Babe Ruth).

== Early life ==
Kingman was born in Pendleton, Oregon, in 1948, and moved with his family to Denver, Colorado, in 1951, then to Los Angeles, California, in 1954, and finally to Mount Prospect, Illinois. Kingman's father worked for United Airlines and moved the family as needed for his career. Kingman attended Prospect High School, where he was a center and a forward on the basketball team, being named All-Area; a wide receiver and safety on the football team; and a star pitcher on the baseball team. Kingman threw a no-hitter against Niles North High School on April 6, 1967. In his final high school game, he hit four home runs and pitched a two-hit shutout.

== Amateur career ==
Kingman was drafted by the California Angels out of high school in the second round of the 1967 Major League Baseball draft. Instead of signing with them he chose to attend Harper Junior College in Palatine, Illinois. After a year he moved on to the University of Southern California (USC) to play college baseball for the Trojans under coach Rod Dedeaux, and was selected by the Baltimore Orioles in the first round of the 1968 draft.

He began as a pitcher at USC before being converted to an outfielder.

In 1969, Kingman had a 11–4 win–loss record with a 1.38 earned run average (ERA) and batted .250 with four home runs and 16 runs batted in (RBIs) as a part-time hitter for USC. In the 1970 USC NCAA Championship Season, Kingman hit .355 with nine home runs and 25 RBIs, exclusively as a hitter, despite missing time mid-season due to injury.

In 1970, Kingman was named an All-America and led the Trojans to the College World Series championship, along with teammates, pitchers Steve Busby, Jim Barr and Brent Strom. Kingman was then selected by the San Francisco Giants with the first pick of the 1970 secondary phase draft.

== Professional career ==
=== Minor leagues (1970–1971) ===
After signing with the Giants, Kingman played for the Class AA Amarillo Giants in 1970 after the College World Series victory. He hit .295 with 15 home runs and 45 RBIs in 60 games. Moving to the Class AAA Phoenix Giants in 1971, he hit .278 with 26 home runs and 99 RBIs in 105 games before being called up by the San Francisco Giants.

=== San Francisco Giants (1971–1974) ===
Kingman came up as an outfielder and first baseman with the San Francisco Giants. He made his major league debut on July 30, 1971, pinch running for Willie McCovey, and finishing the game at first base. He hit a home run in his next game, a grand slam, and hit two more a day later. He finished his rookie season with a .278 batting average, along with 6 home runs and 24 RBI, in 41 games. Kingman appeared in the postseason when the Giants won the National League West and advanced to the National League Championship Series. Kingman went 1-for-10 with three strikeouts as the Giants lost in four games. It would be his only career postseason appearance.

On April 16, 1972, the second day of the season, Kingman hit for the cycle in the Giants' 10–6 victory over the Houston Astros. A day earlier, he made his debut at third base, a position he would play off and on for the remainder of his Giants career. Kingman also made his major league debut on the mound with the Giants, pitching two innings of "mop up duty" in an 11–0 loss to the Cincinnati Reds on April 15, 1973. He pitched again in the mop up role on May 13 in a 15–3 loss to the Los Angeles Dodgers. Each time he pitched the final two innings, and each time gave up two earned runs.

In 1974, he committed twelve errors in 59 chances at third, and lost his starting job to Steve Ontiveros. Unhappy about becoming a part-time player, Kingman requested a trade. Following the season, the Giants sold his contract to the New York Mets.

In four seasons and 409 games with the Giants, Kingman hit .224 with 77 home runs and 217 RBI.

=== New York Mets (1975–1977) ===
Kingman's contract was purchased by the New York Mets from the Giants for $150,000 on February 28, 1975. Mets' manager Yogi Berra compared his incoming slugger to baseball immortal Mickey Mantle.

Kingman played twelve games at third with the Mets; however, the Mets eventually abandoned the idea of Kingman as a third baseman and kept him primarily in the outfield. He emerged as a slugger upon his arrival in New York City, setting a club record with 36 home runs in 1975. Kingman also scored 65 runs, the highest percentage of runs scored on homers for any player who hit more than 30 in a season. A year later, he broke his own record with 37 homers, and was elected to start in right field for the 1976 National League All-Star team. Kingman's single season home run record for the Mets stood until 1987, when it was broken by Darryl Strawberry.

=== San Diego Padres, California Angels and New York Yankees (1977) ===
Kingman was batting .209 with nine home runs when he became one of the three players traded in the "Midnight Massacre" by the New York Mets. On June 15, 1977, the Mets traded Kingman to the San Diego Padres for minor league pitcher Paul Siebert and Bobby Valentine; Tom Seaver was traded to the Cincinnati Reds for Pat Zachry, Doug Flynn, Steve Henderson and Dan Norman; and Mike Phillips was traded to the St. Louis Cardinals for Joel Youngblood.

Kingman was waived by the Padres and claimed by the California Angels on September 6, 1977. On September 15, Kingman became one of only a handful of players to play for four major league teams in the same season (and the only one to play in each division in baseball in a single year since the establishment of divisional play in 1969) when he was traded by the Angels to the New York Yankees, for Randy Stein and cash. Although Kingman's four home runs and seven RBI in eight games helped propel the Yankees into the post-season over the second place Boston Red Sox and Baltimore Orioles, he could not participate in the team's push to a World Series crown as he was added to the roster after the August 31 cutoff date for postseason eligibility.

Overall, Kingman hit .221 with 26 home runs and 78 RBI in 132 games for the four teams in 1977.

=== Chicago Cubs (1978–1980) ===
Kingman signed as a free agent with the Chicago Cubs on November 30, 1977. He wanted to stay with the Yankees, who denied his request for a no-trade clause and offered him $1,250,000 with the expectation that no other team would pay him more money. Kingman's five-year $1,375,000 contract included a $225,000 annual salary, a $250,000 bonus and an additional $50,000 in any year that the Cubs reached the 1.6 million mark in home attendance.

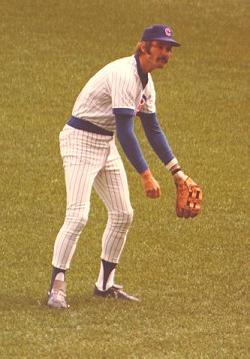
Kingman in 1979 with the Chicago Cubs

In 1978, Kingman hit .266 with 28 home runs and 78 RBI in 119 games with the Cubs.

Kingman had an excellent performance in Los Angeles on May 14, 1978, when he hit three home runs against the Dodgers, including a three-run shot in the top of the 15th inning that gave the Cubs a 10–7 victory. Eight of the Cubs' ten runs were driven in by Kingman. Following the game, radio reporter Paul Olden asked Dodgers' manager Tommy Lasorda his opinion of Kingman's performance that day, inspiring an oft-replayed (and censored) obscenity-laced tirade.

In 1979, Kingman batted .288 with a National League-leading 48 homers, as well as 115 runs batted in (second to San Diego's Dave Winfield's 118) and 97 runs scored. He hit three home runs in a game twice that season, both coming in Cubs losses. The first was a slugging duel with Mike Schmidt on May 17 at Wrigley Field; Kingman hit three home runs and drove in six while Schmidt hit two in the game, with Schmidt delivering his second in the top of the tenth inning to give the Phillies a 23–22 victory. Kingman's third home run during this game is likely the longest home run of his career, and believed to be the longest in the history of Wrigley Field. There is a street called Kenmore Avenue that T's into Waveland Avenue behind left-center field. Kenmore is lined with houses, and the ball Kingman launched landed on the third porch roof on the east side of Kenmore, a shot estimated at 550 feet.

The second three-homer game for Kingman that year came against his former team on July 28 at Shea Stadium in a 6–4 loss to the Mets.

His .613 slugging percentage in 1979 was almost 50 points higher than that of his next closest National League competitor, Schmidt. Kingman finished eleventh in NL MVP balloting that year and led the league in strikeouts for the first time in his career (131).

In 1980, Kingman (whose personality former Mets teammate John Stearns had once compared to a tree trunk) dumped a bucket of ice water on Daily Herald reporter Don Friske's head late in spring training. Kingman regularly insisted he was misquoted, and he began appearing regularly in the Chicago Tribune, as the nominal author of a column ghostwritten by Chicago Park District employee Gerald Pfeiffer. Mike Royko, then writing for the rival Chicago Sun-Times, parodied Kingman's column with a series using the byline "Dave Dingdong."

The Cubs held a Dave Kingman T-shirt Day promotion in conjunction with its game with the Pittsburgh Pirates on August 7, but Kingman instead spent the afternoon at Navy Pier promoting Kawasaki Jet Skis at ChicagoFest.

Kingman was injured in 1980, playing in 81 games, hitting .278 with 18 home runs and 57 RBI.

Overall, in his three seasons with the Cubs, Kingman hit .278 with 94 home runs and 251 RBI and a .907 OPS in 345 games.

=== Return to New York Mets (1981–1983) ===
In January 1980, the Payson heirs sold the Mets franchise to the Doubleday publishing company for $21.1 million. Nelson Doubleday, Jr. was named chairman of the board, while minority shareholder Fred Wilpon took the role of club president. Kingman was reacquired by the Mets from the Cubs for Steve Henderson and cash on February 28, 1981. In separate deals, the new organization also reacquired Rusty Staub, and two seasons later, Tom Seaver.

Kingman primarily played first base upon his return to the Mets in 1981, and exclusively there in his second season back in New York. In 1982, he tied his own Mets' single-season home run record while hitting .204, the lowest batting average for a first baseman with enough plate appearances to qualify for the batting title. It was also the first time that the Cy Young award winner (Steve Carlton) had a higher batting average than the home run champion did. Leading the league in home runs that year, it is also the lowest batting average for any season's home run leader. In spite of this, he still drove in 99 runs.

Kingman led the NL in strikeouts each of his first two seasons after his return to the Mets (105 in an abbreviated 1981, and 156 in 1982). On June 15, 1983, the sixth anniversary of the Midnight Massacre, the Mets acquired first baseman Keith Hernandez from the St. Louis Cardinals for pitchers Neil Allen and Rick Ownbey. Kingman remained with the team for the remainder of the season in a limited role. He was released at the end of the season, and signed as a free agent with the Oakland Athletics.

In six total seasons with the Mets, Kingman hit .219 with 154 home runs and 389 RBI in 664 games.

=== Oakland Athletics (1984–1986) ===
On April 16, 1984, Kingman collected his fifth and final three-homer game, in a 9–6 win over the Seattle Mariners. He made just nine appearances at first base in 1984, and was the A's regular designated hitter in the other games he started. For the 1984 season, he hit .268 with 35 home runs and 118 RBI. He was named the American League's Comeback Player of the Year, and finished 13th in MVP balloting.

After hitting 30 home runs in 1985, Kingman's 35 homers in 1986 were a record for a player in his final season, which held until surpassed by David Ortiz in 2016.

In three seasons as a DH in Oakland, he collected at least 30 home runs and 90 RBIs in each. He also had two at-bats which did not result in home runs, but nonetheless were noteworthy: in the Metrodome against the Minnesota Twins, on May 4, 1984, he hit a pop-up that flew into a hole in the roof and got stuck for a ground rule double. In a game in Seattle on April 11, 1985, he hit a hard drive to left field which struck a speaker hanging from the roof of the Kingdome, bounced back and was caught for an out.

During his final year in Oakland in 1986, Kingman sent a pink gift box to Sue Fornoff, a sportswriter for The Sacramento Bee. Inside there was a live rat, with a tag attached to it that read, "My name is Sue." Fornoff claimed that Kingman had told her that women do not belong in the clubhouse, and that he harassed her several times since she began covering the team the year before. Kingman himself said it was intended as a harmless practical joke, telling reporters: "This is a man's clubhouse. If someone can't take a simple joke, they shouldn't be in the game". The A's fined Kingman $3,500 and warned that he would be released if a similar incident occurred again. When asked if he would apologize to Fornoff, Kingman said, "I've pulled practical jokes on other people and I didn't apologize to them".

Kingman's reputation throughout his major league career was as someone disliked by most reporters and numerous teammates.

When Kingman's contract expired after the 1986 season, Oakland did not renew his contract and he became a free agent. Oakland signed former Athletic and future Hall of Famer Reggie Jackson for his final year as the team's designated hitter for the 1987 season to play alongside the new blood in home run hitting in Jose Canseco and rookie Mark McGwire.

In three seasons with Oakland, under managers Steve Boros, Jackie Moore, and Tony LaRussa, Kingman hit .238 with 100 home runs and 303 RBI.

For his major league career, Kingman batted .236 with 442 home runs and 1210 RBI. He had a .302 OBP, and a .780 OPS, to go with 608 walks and 1816 strikeouts, over 1941 career games. Kingman averaged a home run every 15.11 at bats, tied with Juan González for 19th best all-time.

In 1995, Kingman was awarded over $829,000 in damages for collusion by MLB owners against him (and other MLB players who were free agents), specifically for 1987.

== Retirement ==
On July 11, 1987, Kingman signed a minor league deal with the San Francisco Giants during the 1987 season. After twenty games at AAA Phoenix in which he batted .203 with two home runs and 11 RBI, he retired from baseball.

In 1989, Kingman played for the West Palm Beach Tropics of the Senior Professional Baseball Association, alongside other former major league players. He hit .271 with 8 HR and 40 RBI, as the Tropics had the best record in the Senior League. The league folded in 1990.

In 1992, his first year of eligibility for the Baseball Hall of Fame, he appeared on just three ballots, excluding him from future Baseball Writers' Association of America voting. He was the first player to hit 400 or more home runs without being eventually inducted into the Hall of Fame.

== Personal life ==
Kingman lives in the Lake Tahoe area. He has three children, Adam, Abby and Anna, and operates a local tennis club. His son Adam won season 3 of Making It and was crowned Master Maker.

== See also ==
- List of Major League Baseball career home run leaders
- List of Major League Baseball players to hit for the cycle
- List of Major League Baseball annual home run leaders
