= Joel Youngblood =

American baseball player (born 1951)

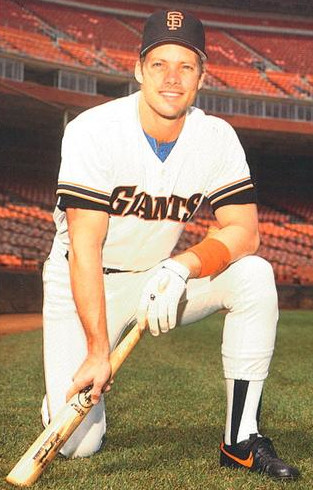
- Youngblood in 1983
- Outfielder
- Born: August 28, 1951 (age 75); Houston, Texas, U.S.
- Batted: Right Threw: Right

MLB debut
- April 13, 1976, for the Cincinnati Reds

Last MLB appearance
- September 29, 1989, for the Cincinnati Reds

MLB statistics
- Batting average: .265
- Home runs: 80
- Runs batted in: 422
- Stats at Baseball Reference

Teams
- Cincinnati Reds (1976); St. Louis Cardinals (1977); New York Mets (1977–1982); Montreal Expos (1982); San Francisco Giants (1983–1988); Cincinnati Reds (1989)

Career highlights and awards
- All-Star (1981); World Series champion (1976)

Joel Randolph Youngblood III (born August 28, 1951) is an American former professional baseball player. He was a versatile player, who could play many different positions, as well as pinch hit. After his playing career ended, he served as the third base coach for the Arizona Diamondbacks.

== Playing career ==
=== Cincinnati Reds ===
Youngblood was drafted by the Cincinnati Reds out of Stephen F. Austin High School in the second round of the 1970 Major League Baseball draft. After six seasons in their farm system, in which he batted .275 with 47 home runs and 274 RBIs, he made his major league debut on April 13, 1976. He batted only .193 for the "Big Red Machine" the season they swept the National League Championship Series and World Series, and he made his one and only appearance as a catcher that season.

=== St. Louis Cardinals ===
During spring training preceding the following season, Youngblood was dealt to the St. Louis Cardinals for Bill Caudill. He hit a home run in his first at-bat as a Cardinal, albeit during an exhibition game. In 25 regular season games with the Cards, Youngblood batted .185 with just one run batted in and no home runs.

=== New York Mets ===
On June 15, 1977, the New York Mets traded Tom Seaver to the Cincinnati Reds for Pat Zachry, Doug Flynn, Steve Henderson and Dan Norman, and Dave Kingman to the San Diego Padres for Bobby Valentine and minor league pitcher Paul Siebert. Somewhat more quietly that day, they also acquired Youngblood from the Cardinals for Mike Phillips. To make room for Youngblood on the Mets' active roster, player-manager Joe Torre retired as a player.

With the Mets, Youngblood emerged as something of a "star" on the team that consistently finished last or close to it throughout his time in New York City. He was the sole Mets representative on the National League team for the 1981 Major League Baseball All-Star Game. In that strike-shortened season, Youngblood hit .350 in 143 at-bats to mark his career-high.

=== MLB first ===
On August 4, 1982, Youngblood became the only player in MLB history to get hits for two different teams in two different cities on the same day. Youngblood started the day as the starting centerfielder for the New York Mets on the road in Chicago against the Cubs, who played all their home games in the afternoon at that time due to Wrigley Field having yet to install lights. In the third inning, hitting off future Hall of Famer Ferguson Jenkins, Youngblood drove in two runs with a single. He was on deck in the next inning when he was called back to the dugout, where he was informed he had been traded to the Montreal Expos. Not only had he been traded, but the Expos had requested Youngblood make himself available for their game later that evening in Philadelphia as they were particularly short handed on players. After saying goodbye to his Mets teammates, checking out of his hotel room in Chicago, and then having to return to Wrigley Field to retrieve his fielding glove, Youngblood boarded a 6:05 PM flight from O’Hare International Airport and landed in Philadelphia approximately ninety minutes later. He reached Veterans Stadium, where the Expos were playing the Phillies, during the sixth inning; Expos manager Jim Fanning called on Youngblood to pinch hit shortly after his arrival. Facing another future Hall of Famer in Steve Carlton, Youngblood reached on an infield single when Manny Trillo could not field the ball cleanly. No one has accomplished this feat since.

=== San Francisco Giants ===
Following the season, Youngblood signed as a free agent with the San Francisco Giants. As a utility player, he appeared in 124 games for the 1983 Giants. In 1984, Youngblood's role with the Giants became more defined as he made 117 appearances at third. His low fielding percentage (.887) at that position returned him to his utility role for the remainder of his Giants career.

Youngblood signed as a free agent with the Cincinnati Reds for 1989. After one season back with the Reds, Youngblood joined the Sun City Rays of the Senior Professional Baseball Association in 1990. He was batting an average of .326 with four home runs and 16 RBI, just when the league folded during the midseason.

== Career statistics ==
In 1408 games over 14 seasons, Youngblood posted a .265 batting average (969-for-3659) with 453 runs, 180 doubles, 23 triples, 80 home runs, 422 RBI, 60 stolen bases, 332 bases on balls, .329 on-base percentage and .392 slugging percentage. He finished his career with a .955 fielding percentage. He played at least one inning at every position except pitcher in his major league career.

== Post-playing career ==
Youngblood served as a coach for the Cincinnati Reds, Milwaukee Brewers and Baltimore Orioles in the 1990s. He also managed the Kane County Cougars, an Orioles farm club in the Midwest League, in 1992. In November 2001 he was named manager of the Newark Bears of the independent Atlantic League, but before he had managed a game he resigned in March 2002 and left for work outside of baseball. He returned to baseball in 2007 to take a coaching job with the Arizona Diamondbacks organization. After serving as a minor league outfield and baserunning coordinator, Youngblood joined the Diamondbacks as third base coach on July 3, 2010. In 2011, he returned to the position of outfield/baserunning coordinator for the Diamondbacks organization.
