= Steve Henderson =

Steve Henderson may refer to:

- Steve Henderson (game designer), (1944–2006), co-designer of several Role Playing Game titles and supplements
- Steve Henderson (baseball), (born 1952), former Major League Baseball left fielder
- Steve Henderson (cricketer), (born 1958), former English cricketer

== See also ==
- Stephen Henderson (disambiguation)
