= Stephen Henderson =

Stephen Henderson may refer to:

- Stephen Henderson (legal scholar), American legal scholar
- Stephen Henderson (literary scholar), (1925–1997), African-American scholar of literature and aesthetics
- Stephen McKinley Henderson, (born 1949), American actor
- Stephen Henderson (footballer, born 1966), Irish footballer
- Stephen Henderson (journalist), (born 1970), American journalist
- Stephen Henderson (footballer, born 1988), Irish footballer

== See also ==
- Steve Henderson (disambiguation)
