= Tom O'Malley =

American baseball player (born 1960)

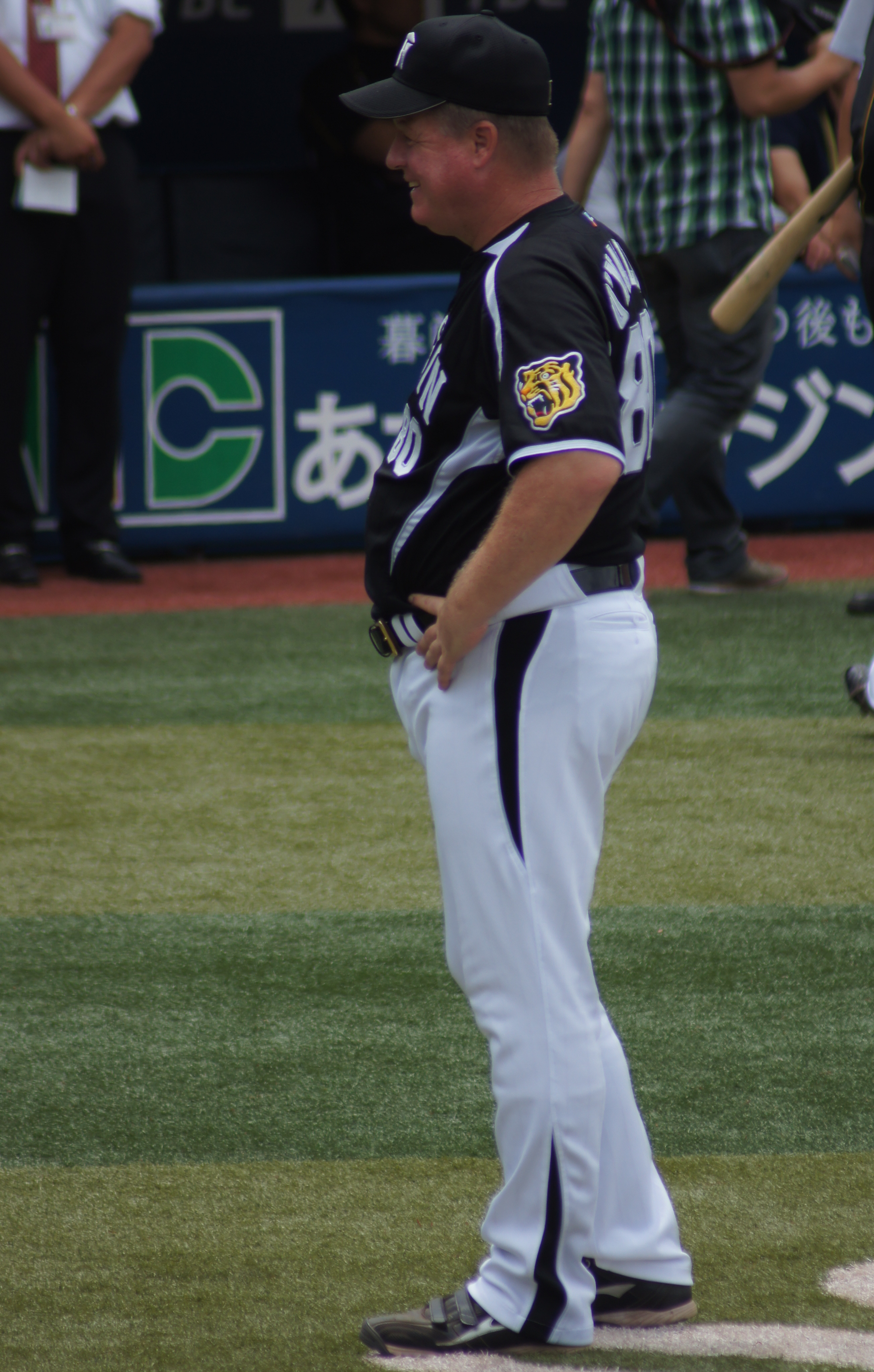
- O'Malley in 2014
- Third baseman
- Born: December 25, 1960 (age 65); Orange, New Jersey, U.S.
- Batted: Left Threw: Right

Professional debut
- MLB: May 8, 1982, for the San Francisco Giants
- NPB: April 6, 1991, for the Hanshin Tigers

Last appearance
- MLB: October 3, 1990, for the New York Mets
- NPB: October 9, 1996, for the Yakult Swallows

MLB statistics
- Batting average: .256
- Home runs: 13
- Runs batted in: 131

NPB statistics
- Batting average: .315
- Home runs: 123
- Runs batted in: 488
- Stats at Baseball Reference

Teams
- San Francisco Giants (1982–1984); Chicago White Sox (1984); Baltimore Orioles (1985–1986); Texas Rangers (1987); Montreal Expos (1988); New York Mets (1989–1990); Hanshin Tigers (1991–1994); Yakult Swallows (1995–1996)

Career highlights and awards
- 3× Central League All-Star; Central League MVP (1995); Japan Series MVP (1995)

Thomas Patrick O'Malley (born December 25, 1960) is an American former Major League Baseball player born in Orange, New Jersey, and raised in Montoursville, Pennsylvania in the United States. He played for the San Francisco Giants, Chicago White Sox, Baltimore Orioles, Texas Rangers, Montreal Expos, and New York Mets. He also spent six highly successful seasons in the Japanese Central League with the Hanshin Tigers and Yakult Swallows. He also worked as a manager for the Newark Bears in the Atlantic League of Professional Baseball after retiring.

== Biography ==
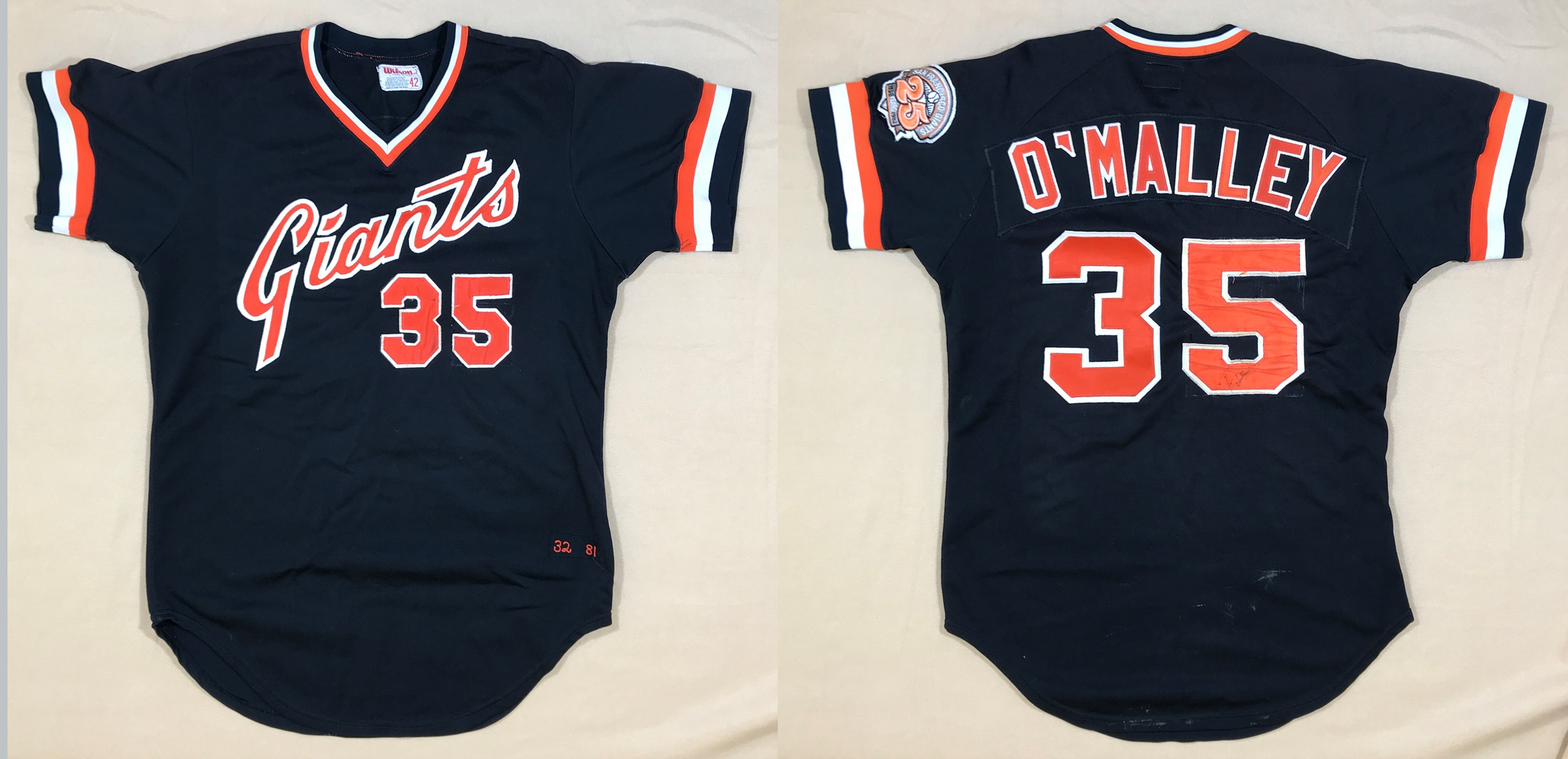
1982 San Francisco Giants #35 Tom O'Malley game worn road jersey

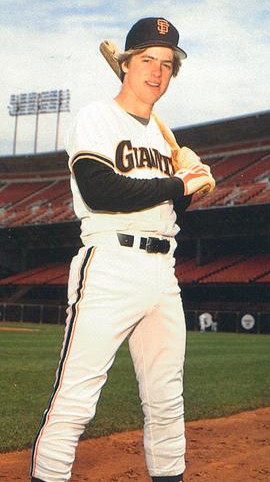
O'Malley with the San Francisco Giants

O'Malley was drafted by the San Francisco Giants in 1979, and made his major league debut with the Giants in 1982. He played in 135 major league games in 1983, but split time with the majors and minors afterwards, spending nine years playing for six different teams. He was acquired by the Orioles from the Tigers for Luis Rosado on May 23, 1985. He was signed by the Hanshin Tigers in 1991, and immediately became the regular third baseman for the team. He won the Central League golden glove award in 1992, and led the league in on-base-percentage from 1992 to 1995, averaging 20 HRs and a batting average over .300 each season. He introduced Jim Paciorek to the Tigers in 1992, and managed to put the struggling Tigers in second place that year. O'Malley won the batting title in 1993, but left the Tigers in 1994 after having issues with manager Katsuhiro Nakamura.

He was quickly picked up by the Yakult Swallows in 1995, and played his best season that year, hitting 31 home runs with 87 RBIs and a .307 batting average. The Swallows won the Japan Series that year, and O'Malley was awarded both the season MVP award, and the Japan Series MVP award.

He hit .300 for the sixth season in a row in 1996, (a record among non-Japanese players in the Japanese professional leagues) but split with the Swallows over contract obligations. He returned to the major leagues to spend spring training with the Texas Rangers, but retired after he was cut from the team. He managed the Newark Bears from 1998 to 2001 after retiring.

He returned to Japan during the Hanshin Tigers 2002 spring training camp, and served as a batting coach throughout the season. He was also a mentor for non-Japanese players, including George Arias, Jeff Williams, Trey Moore, and Jerrod Riggan, who contributed to the Tigers' championship in 2003. O'Malley resigned from his coaching job after Senichi Hoshino resigned from his managerial position. He scouted players in the major and minor leagues for the Hanshin Tigers until 2009, and traveled to Japan during spring training to offer advice to non-Japanese players. He has appeared in various television commercials in the local Kansai region (Hanshin Electric Railway Co., Ltd.), and posters featuring O'Malley could be found in Koshien Stadium.
