= Luis Rosado =

Puerto Rican baseball player (born 1955)

- First baseman
- Born: December 6, 1955 (age 70); Santurce, Puerto Rico
- Batted: Right Threw: Right

MLB debut
- September 8, 1977, for the New York Mets

Last MLB appearance
- October 5, 1980, for the New York Mets

MLB statistics
- Batting average: .179
- Runs: 1
- Hits: 5
- Stats at Baseball Reference

Teams
- New York Mets (1977, 1980)

Luis Rosado Robles (born December 6, 1955) is a Puerto Rican former Major League Baseball first baseman. He played during two seasons at the major league level for the New York Mets. He signed as an amateur free agent by the Mets in 1972. Rosado played his first professional season with their Rookie league Marion Mets in 1972, and his last with the Baltimore Orioles' Triple-A Rochester Red Wings and the Detroit Tigers' Double-A Birmingham Barons and Triple-A Nashville Sounds in 1985. He had been traded from the Orioles to the Tigers for Tom O'Malley on May 23, 1985.
