= Joe Torre =

American baseball player, manager, and executive (born 1940)

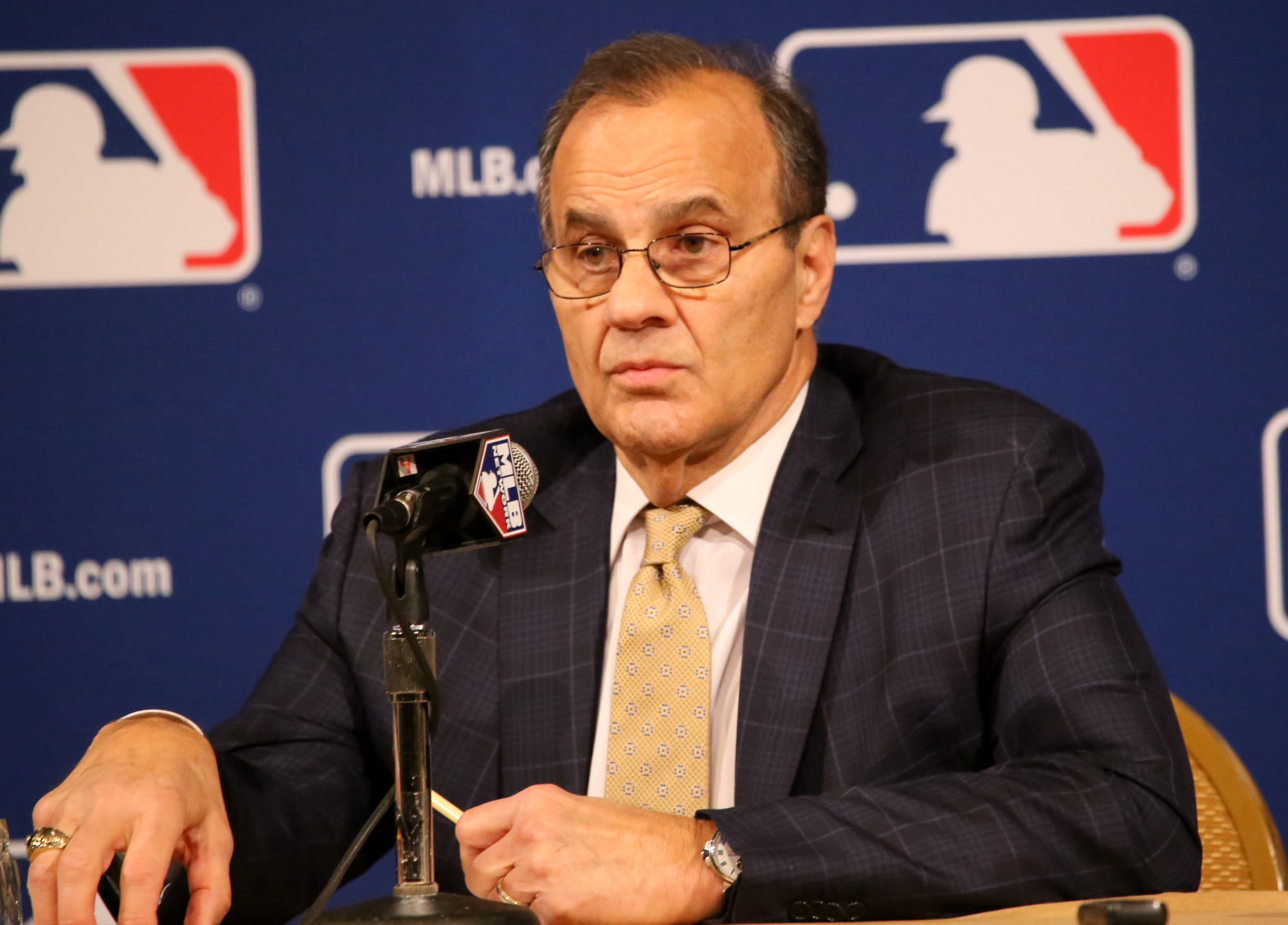
- Torre in 2015
- Catcher / First baseman / Third baseman / Manager
- Born: July 18, 1940 (age 86); Brooklyn, New York, U.S.
- Batted: Right Threw: Right

MLB debut
- September 25, 1960, for the Milwaukee Braves

Last MLB appearance
- June 17, 1977, for the New York Mets

MLB statistics
- Batting average: .297
- Hits: 2,342
- Home runs: 252
- Runs batted in: 1,185
- Managerial record: 2,326–1,997–6
- Winning %: .538
- Stats at Baseball Reference
- Managerial record at Baseball Reference

Teams
- As player: Milwaukee / Atlanta Braves (1960–1968); St. Louis Cardinals (1969–1974); New York Mets (1975–1977); As manager: New York Mets (1977–1981); Atlanta Braves (1982–1984); St. Louis Cardinals (1990–1995); New York Yankees (1996–2007); Los Angeles Dodgers (2008–2010)

Career highlights and awards
- 9× All-Star (1963–1967, 1970–1973); 4× World Series champion (1996, 1998–2000); NL MVP (1971); Gold Glove Award (1965); NL batting champion (1971); NL RBI leader (1971); 2× AL Manager of the Year (1996, 1998); New York Yankees No. 6 retired; Braves Hall of Fame; St. Louis Cardinals Hall of Fame; Monument Park honoree

Member of the National

Baseball Hall of Fame
- Induction: 2014
- Vote: 100%
- Election method: Expansion Era Committee

Joseph Paul Torre Jr. (/ˈtɒri/; born July 18, 1940) is an American professional baseball executive and former player, manager, and television color commentator. He has served as a special assistant to the commissioner of Major League Baseball since 2020. He previously served in the capacity of Major League Baseball's (MLB) chief baseball officer from 2011 to 2020. Torre ranks fifth all-time in MLB history with 2,326 wins as a manager. With 2,342 hits during his playing career, Torre is the only major leaguer to achieve both 2,000 hits as a player and 2,000 wins as a manager. From 1996 to 2007, he was the manager of the New York Yankees, and guided the team to six American League (AL) pennants and four World Series championships.

Torre's professional baseball career began as a player in 1960 with the Milwaukee Braves, as a catcher and first baseman. He also played for the St. Louis Cardinals (for whom he played primarily third base) and the New York Mets, until becoming a manager in 1977, when he briefly served as the Mets' player-manager before retiring as a player. His managerial career covered 29 seasons, including tenures with the same three clubs for which he had played, and also stints with the Yankees and the Los Angeles Dodgers, until 2010. From 1984 to 1989, he served as a television color commentator for the California Angels and for NBC. After retiring as a manager, he accepted a role assisting the Commissioner as the executive vice president of baseball operations.

A nine-time All-Star, Torre won the 1971 National League (NL) Most Valuable Player (MVP) Award after leading the major leagues in batting average, hits, and runs batted in. After qualifying for the playoffs just once while managing the Mets, Braves, and Cardinals (leading the Braves to the 1982 NL West title, before losing in the NLCS), Torre's greatest success came as manager of the Yankees. His Yankee clubs compiled a .605 regular-season winning percentage and made the playoffs every year, winning four World Series titles, six AL pennants, and ten AL East division titles. In 1996 and 1998, he was the AL Manager of the Year. He also won two NL West division titles with the Dodgers, for a total of 13 division titles. In 2014, Torre was elected to the National Baseball Hall of Fame.

== Early life ==
Joseph Paul Torre Jr. was born July 18, 1940, in Brooklyn, New York City, New York, to Italian immigrants Margaret and Joseph Sr., a plainclothes officer in the New York City Police Department. He was the youngest of five children, with two brothers, Frank (who also went on to play in the Major Leagues) and Rocco, and two sisters, Rae and Josephine. Torre was raised in the Marine Park neighborhood of Brooklyn. Torre's father Joseph abused Margaret until Torre was 13 years old, when Torre's brother Frank convinced their father to move out. The couple would later divorce.

Torre played baseball at Saint Francis Prep and in the All-American Amateur Baseball Association for the Brooklyn Cadets. Heavyset as a teenager, Torre was not considered a viable professional prospect until he converted to catcher on the advice of his brother Frank. Torre worked briefly at the American Stock Exchange after high school.

== Professional playing career ==
=== Minor leagues ===
Torre followed in his brother Frank's footsteps when he was signed by the Milwaukee Braves as an amateur free agent in 1959. In his first season in the minor leagues with the Class C Eau Claire Braves, he won the 1960 Northern League batting championship with a .344 batting average.

=== Milwaukee / Atlanta Braves (1960–1968) ===
Torre made his major league debut late in the season on September 25, 1960. For the 1961 season he was assigned to the Triple A Louisville Colonels, where the Braves planned to groom him as the eventual successor to their All-Star catcher, Del Crandall. However, those plans were changed when Crandall injured his throwing arm in May 1961, forcing the Braves to promote Torre to the major leagues with just over a year of minor league experience. Torre rose to the occasion, hitting for a .278 batting average with 21 doubles and 10 home runs. He finished the season ranked second to Billy Williams in the 1961 National League Rookie of the Year voting.

Crandall resumed his role as the starting catcher in 1962 while Torre stayed on as the back-up catcher. By the 1963 season, the Braves had begun to play Crandall at first base as Torre had taken over the starting catcher's role. He ended the season with a .293 batting average with 14 home runs and 71 runs batted in, and earned a spot as a reserve for the National League team in the 1963 All-Star Game. In December 1963, the Braves traded Crandall to the San Francisco Giants, leaving Torre as the undisputed number one catcher.

Torre had a breakout year in 1964 when he batted .321 (fourth highest in the National League) with 20 home runs and 109 runs batted in, and he led National League catchers with a .995 fielding percentage. He was selected as the starting catcher for the National League in the 1964 All-Star Game. Despite the fact that the Braves finished the season in fifth place, Torre ranked fifth in voting for the 1964 National League Most Valuable Player Award.

In 1965, Torre won his first of two NL Player of the Month awards when he took the honor for May, batting .382, with 10 HR and 24 RBIs. Torre was once again the starting catcher for the National League in the 1965 All-Star Game, and he hit a two-run home run against Milt Pappas to help the National League to a 6–5 victory. He ended the season with a career-high 27 home runs and 80 runs batted in, though his batting average dipped to .291. Torre won his first and only Gold Glove Award in 1965; however, baseball historian Bill James later said the decision was influenced by his offensive statistics and that either John Roseboro or Tom Haller were more deserving of the award. In an article for the St. Petersburg Independent that year, Beat Generation author Jack Kerouac called Torre "the best catcher since Roy Campanella."

For the 1966 season the Braves moved to Atlanta and the new Atlanta–Fulton County Stadium. The stadium's elevation in the foothills of the Appalachian Mountains made it favorable to home run hitters, which led to the stadium's nickname, "The Launching Pad". On April 12, 1966, Torre hit the stadium's first major league home run. Torre produced a career-high 36 home runs with 101 runs batted in, a .315 batting average, a .382 on-base percentage, and led National League catchers with a 48.6% caught stealing percentage. He started behind the plate for the National League All-Star team for the third successive year. His offensive production tapered off in 1967, during which he compiled a .277 batting average with 68 runs batted in, though he still hit 20 home runs and won his fourth consecutive start in the 1967 All-Star Game. He posted another sub-par season in 1968 with a .271 batting average, 10 home runs, and 55 runs batted in; yet he led National League catchers with a .996 fielding percentage.

Before the 1969 season, Torre feuded with Braves General Manager Paul Richards over his salary. Eventually, the Braves traded Torre to the St. Louis Cardinals for Orlando Cepeda, winner of the 1967 Most Valuable Player award.

=== St. Louis Cardinals (1969–1974) ===
1970 photocard of Torre for St. Louis Cardinals

The Cardinals had Tim McCarver as their starting catcher, so Torre replaced the departed Cepeda at first base for the 1969 season. His offensive statistics rebounded, and he ended the season with a .289 batting average, alongside 18 home runs and 101 runs batted in. In 1970, the Cardinals traded McCarver to the Philadelphia Phillies along with Curt Flood, Byron Browne, and Joe Hoerner, in return for Dick Allen, Jerry Johnson, and Cookie Rojas. Allen took over as the Cardinals' first baseman while Torre split his playing time between playing third base and sharing catching duties with young prospect Ted Simmons. His offensive statistics continued to improve, as he hit 21 home runs with 100 runs batted in and finished second to Rico Carty for the National League batting title with a .325 batting average.

The Cardinals made Simmons their full-time catcher in 1971, leaving Torre to concentrate on playing third base. Freed from the mentally challenging, strength-sapping job of catching, Torre had a career-season offensively. Torre won the National League batting championship, hitting career highs in batting average, .363, hits, 230, and an NL leading 137 RBIs along with 24 home runs, en route to winning the 1971 National League Most Valuable Player award. He also was voted to be the starting third baseman for the National League in the 1971 All-Star Game. He was named NL Player of the Month for the second and final time in August (.373, 5 HR, 27 RBI). Adapting to a new defensive position proved to be a challenge, as Torre led the league's third basemen with 21 errors. In December, he was awarded the 1971 Hutch Award, given annually to the player who best exemplifies the fighting spirit and competitive desire of Fred Hutchinson.

In 1972, Torre won his second consecutive starting role as third baseman for the National League in the All-Star Game. However, his offensive numbers for the season dipped to a .289 batting average with 11 home runs and 81 runs batted in. After two more sub-par seasons, the Cardinals traded the 34-year-old Torre to the New York Mets for Ray Sadecki and Tommy Moore on October 13, 1974.

=== New York Mets (1975–1977) ===
With the Mets in 1975, Torre became the third player in Major League history, and first in the National League, to hit into four double plays in one game. Felix Millán singled in all four of his at-bats hitting ahead of Torre, and at a post-game press conference, Torre joked about his own performance by saying "I'd like to thank Felix Millán for making this possible." When Torre's batting average fell to .247 in 1975, it appeared that his best years might be behind him. However, his average rebounded 59 points in 1976, and he finished the year with a .306 batting average. In May 1977, the Mets fired manager Joe Frazier and named Torre as their player–manager. Torre was the second of three player-managers in the 1970s, the other two being Frank Robinson in 1975 and 1976 with the Cleveland Indians, and Don Kessinger in 1979 with the Chicago White Sox. Because Torre believed he could not do the job of manager properly while still playing, he decided to retire at age 37. He served 18 days as a player-manager, having two at-bats. His final at-bat came on June 17, 1977, at Shea Stadium against the Houston Astros, when he put himself in as a pinch hitter. He flied out to right field, thereby ending his playing career.

== Managerial career ==
=== New York Mets (1977–1981) ===
Torre managed the Mets from 1977 to 1981 season, but failed to improve the team's record. He went 49–68 in his first season with the Mets, while the team finished 64–98 overall and in last place in the NL East. The next three seasons were similar, as the Mets went 66–96, 63–99, and 67–95, though avoiding last place in 1980. The strike-shortened season of 1981 was Torre's last with the team, and he went 17–34 in the first half of the season and 24–28 in the second half, finishing fifth and fourth, respectively. After five years without a winning season, Torre was fired at the end of the strike-shortened 1981 season.

=== Atlanta Braves (1982–1984) ===
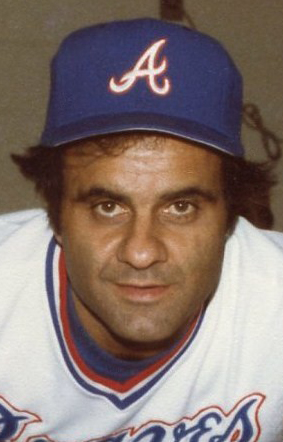
Torre in 1982

In 1982, Torre replaced Bobby Cox as the manager of the Atlanta Braves, and immediately guided the team to a Major League record 13 straight wins to open the season, a mark that was later tied by the 1987 Milwaukee Brewers and the 2023 Tampa Bay Rays. Atlanta subsequently went on to finish 89–73 and capture the National League West division title, its first playoff appearance since the 1969 National League Championship Series (NLCS). In Game 1 of the 1982 NLCS against the St. Louis Cardinals, the Braves jumped out to a 1–0 lead before the game was delayed by rain after four innings. The rain persisted, and the game was wiped out just three outs short of an official game. St. Louis won the restaged Game 1, and went on to sweep the series. Torre was named the Associated Press (AP) Manager of the Year, becoming the first person to win both that and an MVP award.

The Braves slipped to second place in 1983, with an 88–74 record that was just one game off of the division-winning record of the previous season. This marked the first consecutive winning seasons for the team since moving from Milwaukee in 1966. In 1984, Atlanta slipped to 80–82, but again finished second in the division (tied with Houston Astros). Torre was fired after the 1984 season.

=== St. Louis Cardinals (1990–1995) ===
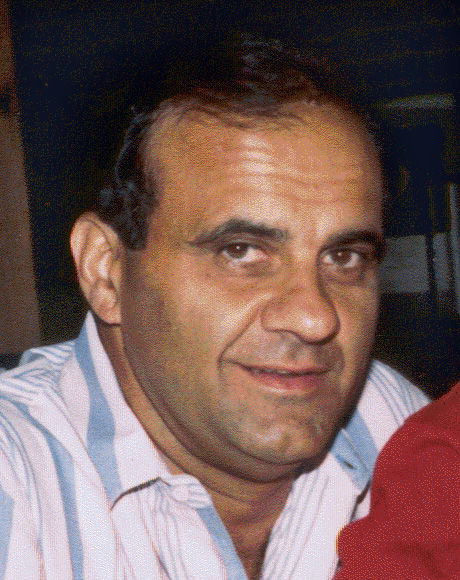
Torre in 1995.

In 1990, Torre replaced the popular Whitey Herzog as Cardinals manager and posted a 351–354 record. Though the Cardinals were unable to reach the playoffs during Torre's tenure, they had winning records in three of the four seasons he spent with the club. Despite a last-place prediction from many commentators, the Cardinals finished in second place and won 84 games in 1991, Torre's first full season at the helm. His best record was 87–75 in 1993. Torre was fired in June 1995 for his poor record that year, and also as part of a rebuilding project while Anheuser-Busch prepared to sell the team.

=== New York Yankees (1996–2007) ===
After being hired on November 2, 1995, Torre served as the Yankees' manager under owner George Steinbrenner. Torre lasted twelve full seasons, managing 1,942 regular-season games, with a won-loss record of 1,173–767. He took the team to the postseason in every one of his twelve seasons with the club, winning six American League pennants and four World Series. Torre had by far the longest tenure for a Yankees manager in the Steinbrenner era, and his time as manager is tied for the second-longest in club history with those of Miller Huggins and Casey Stengel, behind the sixteen-season run of Joe McCarthy. Torre is the only Yankees manager who was born in New York City.

==== 1996–2005 ====
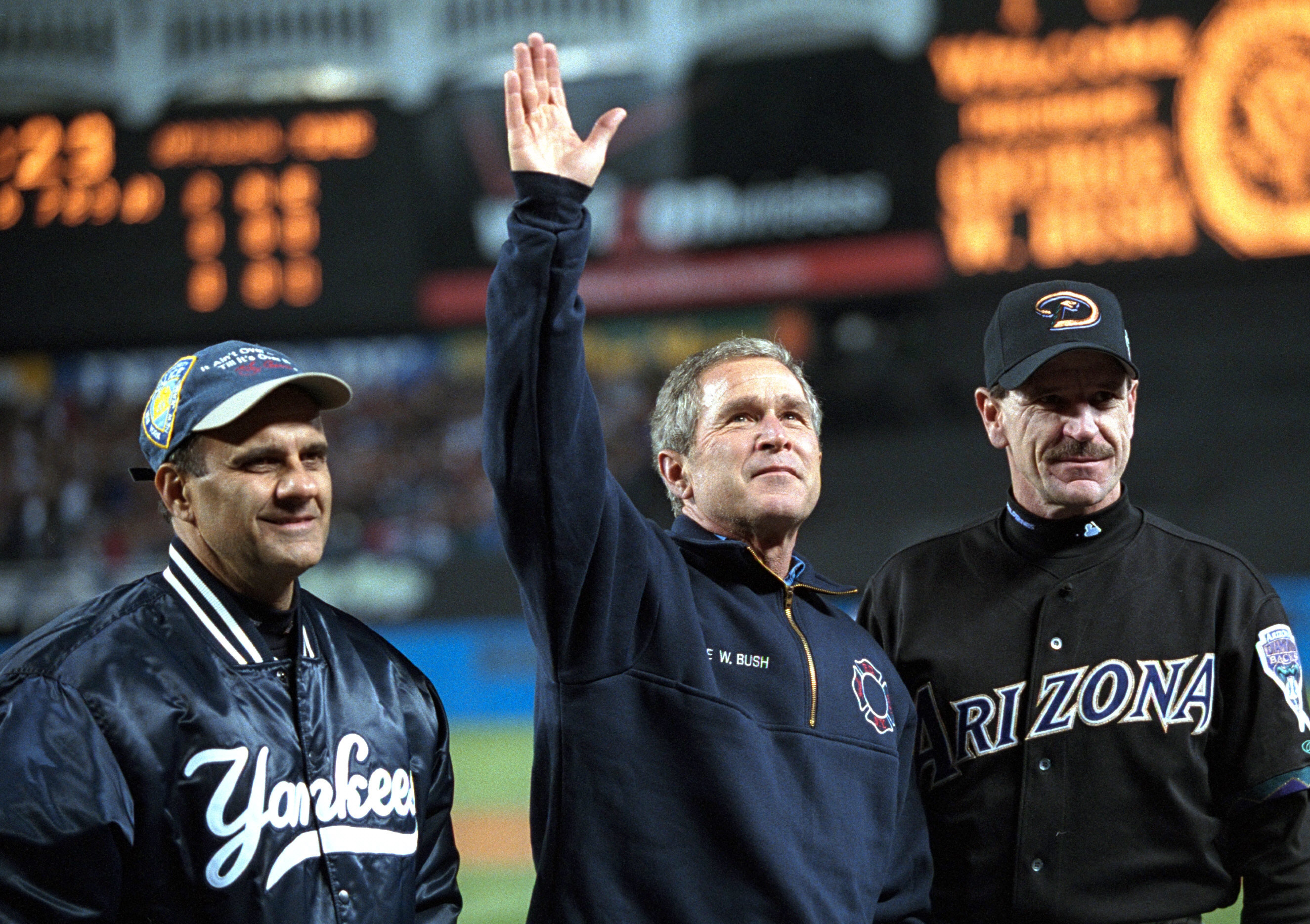
Joe Torre (left) with George W. Bush and Diamondbacks manager Bob Brenly on the field at Yankee Stadium before Game 3 of the 2001 World Series.

Before his first game with the Yankees, Torre got off to a rough start. The New York City press (and fans) thought his hiring was a colossal mistake and greeted him with tabloid headlines such as "Clueless Joe." Including his three previous jobs, he had been a combined 109 games below .500, and had never won a playoff game in 14 seasons. He had appeared in 2,209 games as a player and 1,901 as a manager for a total of 4,110 games without reaching a World Series, let alone winning it.

However, it was with the Yankees that he enjoyed the greatest success of his managerial career, leading the team to the playoffs in each of his twelve seasons (1996–2007) there. In 1996, he was named Manager of the Year. Torre, building on the Yankees' Wild Card berth in 1995, made his first-ever trip to the World Series, leading the Yankees to their first Series since 1981. After the Yankees defeated the Atlanta Braves, Steinbrenner tore up Torre's contract and gave him a new, more lucrative, and longer contract as a reward.

On April 30, 1997, Torre won his 1,000th game as manager, with a 2–1 victory over the Seattle Mariners. The Yankees went into the postseason for the third straight year, albeit as a Wild Card. They lost to the Cleveland Indians in the Division Series. After that, the team would win three straight World Series titles from 1998 to 2000, and additional American League pennants in 2001 and 2003.

The 1998 season was Torre's most successful. Despite a slow start that included losing four of the first five games of the season, the Yankees set a then-American League record of 114 regular-season wins, including David Wells's perfect game against the Minnesota Twins on May 17. It was in an August 11 victory over the Twins that Torre evened his career record win–loss record, making it 1168–1168. One other manager in Yankees' history, Stengel, had joined the team with a career record further below .500 than Torre, at 166 games; Stengel, too, reached .500 for his career during his time as Yankees manager.

During the 1998 playoffs, the Yankees easily bested the Texas Rangers, fought off the Cleveland Indians for the AL pennant, and swept the San Diego Padres in the World Series. His club set a major-league record of 125 total wins a season, including the regular season and the postseason, breaking the 1906 Chicago Cubs' record of 118. Torre won Manager of the Year honors, and the 1998 team is now widely regarded as one of the best teams of all time, along with the Yankee teams of 1927, 1939 and 1961, the 1972–1974 Oakland Athletics, and the 1975–1976 Cincinnati Reds. When ESPN launched its Who's#1? series on June 15, 2004, the 1998 Yankees topped the network's list of best teams over the years 1979 to 2003.

Torre presided over a second perfect game in 1999, this time behind starter David Cone, who defeated the Montreal Expos 6–0. This occurred on July 18, Torre's 59th birthday. He thus became the first to manage his teams to two perfect game wins, while becoming just the fourth in MLB history to manage his club in two perfect games, joining Stengel (1–1), Walter Alston (1–1), and Tommy Lasorda (0–2). The Yankees also won their second consecutive World Series.

With a win over Minnesota on May 12, 2002, Torre became the 17th manager in Major League history to reach the milestone of 1,500 victories.

In 2004, Torre suffered his greatest setback, marking the end of the Yankees' dominance. After building a 3–0 lead in the ALCS against the Boston Red Sox, his team would go on to lose the next four games and the ALCS. This Red Sox victory was the first time that any team had come back from being down three games to none in a series, and such a comeback has not happened again since. The Red Sox would go on to win the 2004 World Series, their first title since 1918, thereby ending the "Curse of the Bambino", which had supposedly been inflicted on the team when Babe Ruth was sold to the Yankees in early 1920.

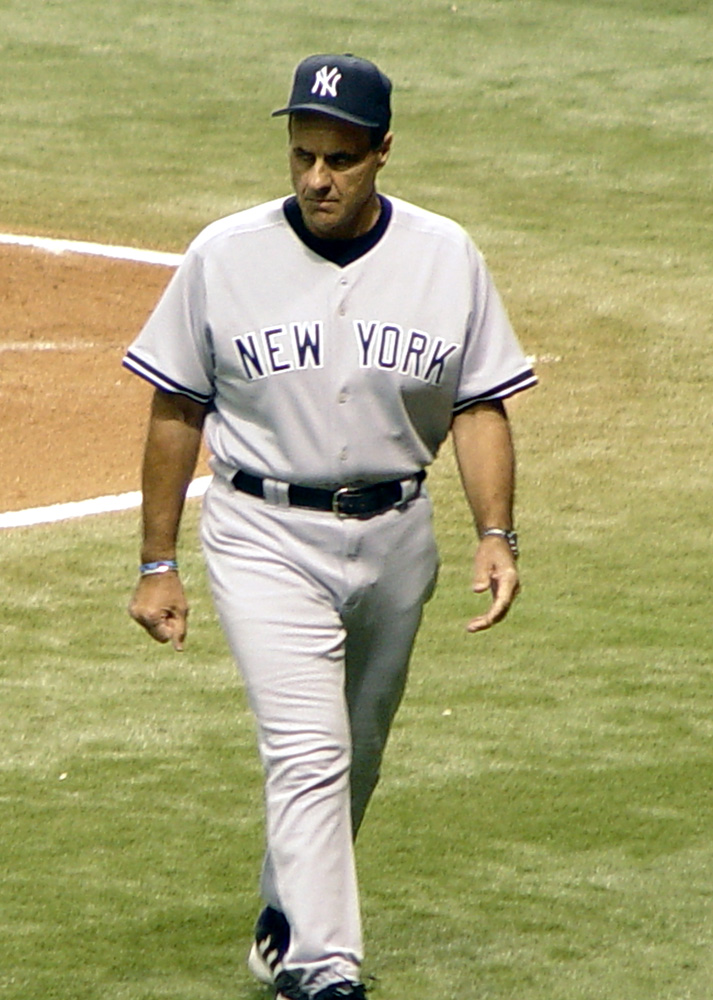
Torre after visiting the mound during a 2005 game

After getting off to an 8−11 start in 2005, the Yankees played their last five months at 84−48. They won 14 of their last 18 on their way to employing a franchise record 51 players to overtake Boston and capture their eighth consecutive AL East title. Their season ended in a five-game ALDS loss to the Los Angeles Angels of Anaheim.

==== 2006–2007 ====
Despite pitching issues and injuries, the Yankees won another AL East title in 2006, but would go on to lose the ALDS to the Detroit Tigers in four games.

In 2007, Torre became the first man to win 2,000 games as a Major League manager and also collect 2,000 hits as a Major League player. He later notched his 2,010th managerial win, overtaking Leo Durocher for ninth place on the MLB all-time managerial wins list. Next, he passed Stengel on the Yankees' all-time managerial wins list in 2007 with his 1,150th victory with the team. Torre led the Yankees to their 13th consecutive postseason appearance.

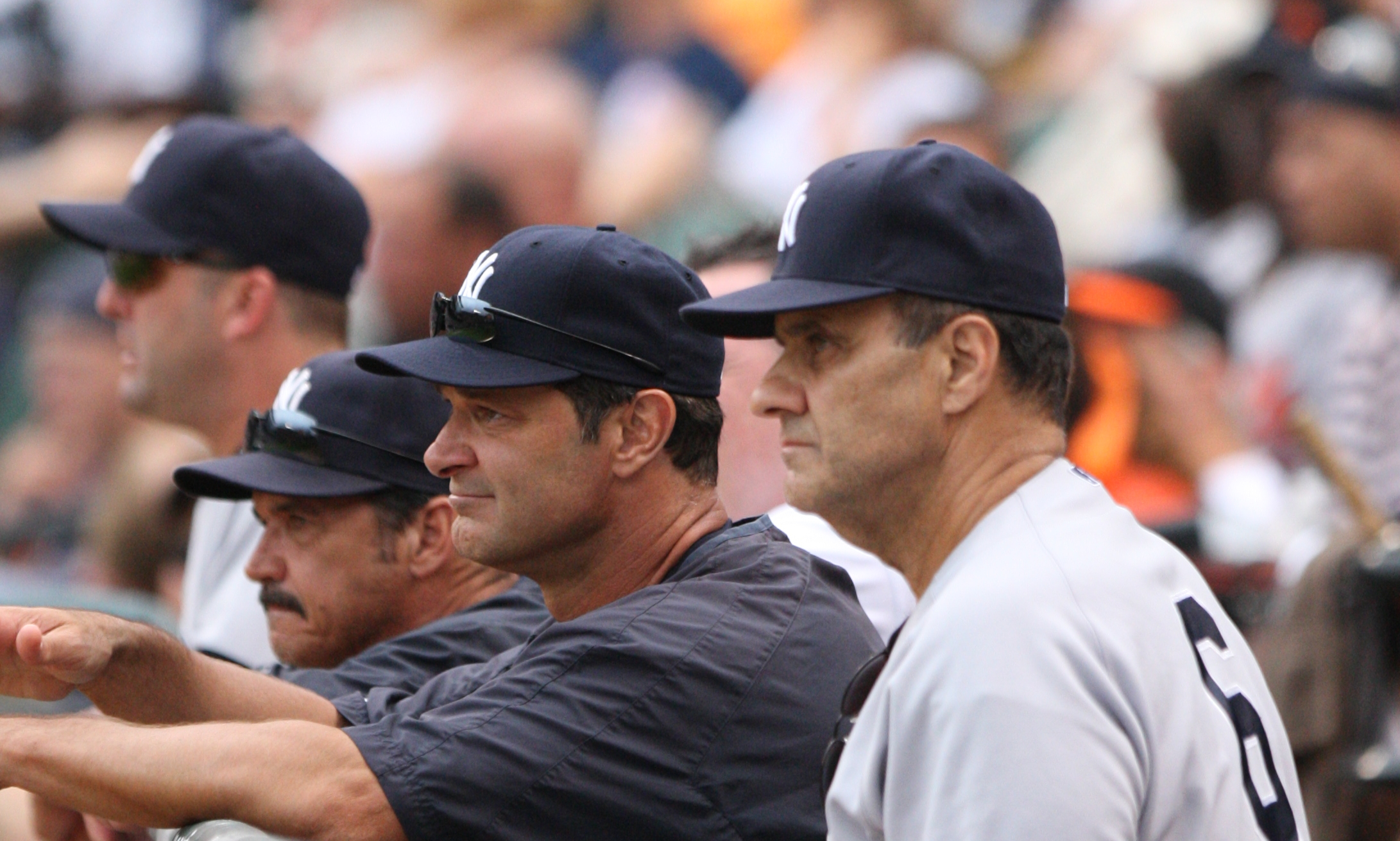
Torre with Don Mattingly in 2007

After two Yankees losses to the Cleveland Indians in the Division Series, Steinbrenner said in an interview that Torre's contract would not be renewed if the Yankees did not defeat the Indians. The Yankees saved their season, and potentially Torre's job, for one day, as they won Game 3 at Yankee Stadium. Following the Yankees' elimination the following night, earning them another first-round exit, Torre's fate remained uncertain. That night, as he went out to make what would be his last pitching change with the team, the fans in Yankee Stadium chanted his name.

After the season, the Yankees met with Torre and offered him a one-year contract with a $5 million base pay and $1 million bonuses, to be paid for each of three benchmarks the team would reach: winning the American League Division Series; winning the American League Championship Series; and winning the World Series. Further, had the Yankees reached the World Series, that would have automatically triggered an option for a new contract the following year. In spite of a pay cut from an average of $6.4 million over the previous three seasons, the new terms would have kept him as the highest-paid manager in the game.

Yankee Global Enterprises chairman Hal Steinbrenner "explained the rationale behind the offer, which was nonnegotiable." Yankees president Randy Levine commented, "We thought we needed to go with a performance-based model. It's important to motivate people based on performance." George Steinbrenner, on account of his advancing age and his deteriorating health, had noticeably less influence in the day-to-day operation of the club. Of the ultimatum he issued during the playoffs, his son Hal denied that his comments influenced the terms of the contract they presented to Torre.

The New York media portrayed the offer as an insult. Torre turned it down, ending his era with the Yankees. On October 19, 2007, he held a news conference to explain his decision. After first thanking George Steinbrenner, he remarked, "I just felt the contract offer and the terms of the contract were probably the thing I had the toughest time with."

Of the aftermath, Wallace Matthews of Newsday commented, "They are very slick, these thugs running the Yankees. ... They have been trying to figure out a way to whack Torre while making it appear as if Torre whacked himself. What they came up with was brilliant in its innovation and chilling in its cynicism, but ultimately transparent." Opined Mike Lupica, "It was just the most famous disagreement we are ever likely to see in baseball, the most famous manager telling the people who run the most famous team to take their job and shove it. A manager finally fired the Yankees." Added Joel Sherman, "Torre erred in turning down the Yankees' proposal to stay in the position that has made him rich and famous beyond what he could have dreamed a dozen years ago." He also walks "away from that juice as much as the ownership."

On February 3, 2009, Torre released a book about his experiences with the Yankees, called The Yankee Years, co-authored by Tom Verducci.

Torre returned to Yankee Stadium for the first time since vacating the Yankees managerial job on September 20, 2010, to pay respect to George Steinbrenner on the night of the previous owner's monument being unveiled in Monument Park.

=== Los Angeles Dodgers (2008–2010) ===
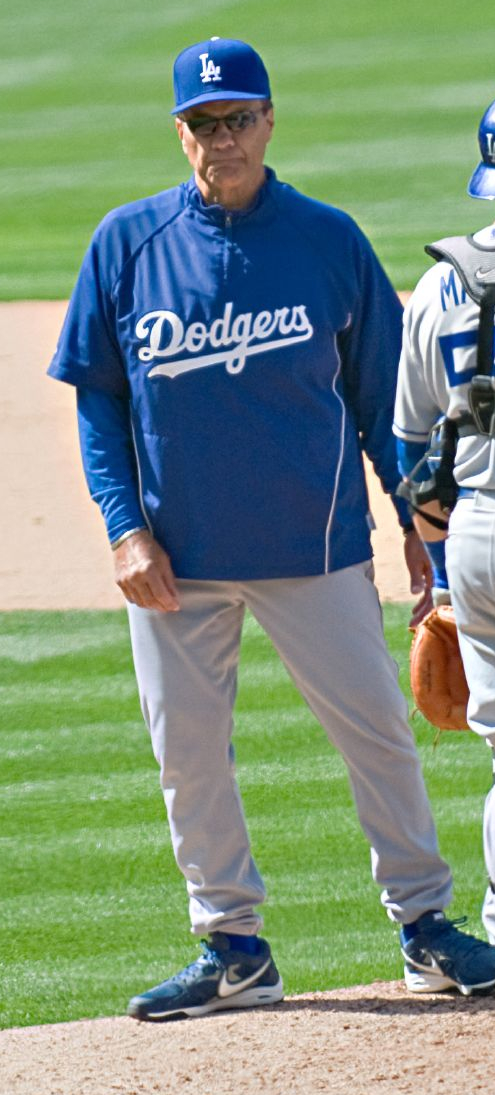
Torre as the Dodgers' manager, April 6, 2008

On November 1, 2007, the Los Angeles Dodgers announced that Torre would be their manager beginning with the 2008 season, succeeding Grady Little, who had resigned the post two days before. This marked the return of Torre to the National League, the only league he had played or managed in prior to becoming the Yankees' skipper. According to ESPN, Torre's contract was valued at $13 million over three years. Torre brought two members of his 2007 Yankees coaching staff with him. Don Mattingly, who had served as Torre's bench coach, was tabbed as the hitting coach; and third base coach Larry Bowa was brought in to fill the same position with the Dodgers. In January 2008, Mattingly was moved to the role of special assignment coach for the 2008 season due to family concerns. He was replaced as hitting coach by Mike Easler.

In addition, Torre brought in Bob Schaefer to be bench coach, and retained first base coach Mariano Duncan (whom he had managed with the Yankees) and pitching coach Rick Honeycutt from Little's staff. Ken Howell was promoted from Triple-A pitching coach to bullpen coach, completing Torre's staff. Torre had grown up in Brooklyn when the Dodgers played there, but he admitted to having been a New York Giants fan then, adding another twist to the longstanding rivalry between the two clubs.

On March 31, 2008, Joe Torre made his managerial debut with the Dodgers in a 5–0 victory, managing several former members of the 2003 Red Sox, such as Manny Ramirez, Derek Lowe, and Nomar Garciaparra. On September 25, 2008, the Dodgers clinched the National League West title, giving Torre his 13th consecutive postseason appearance. October 4, 2008, saw Torre managing the Dodgers to a 3–0 victory over the Chicago Cubs in the National League Division Series, earning the Dodgers their first post-season series victory since their championship season of 1988. Torre's Dodgers were beaten in the NLCS four games to one by the eventual World Series-winning Phillies.

In 2009, Torre served as a coach on manager Charlie Manuel's staff in the All-Star Game. The Dodgers achieved the National League's best record (95–67), clinching the top seed. They faced the St. Louis Cardinals, in the National League Division Series, sweeping them in three games. However, they went on to lose to the Philadelphia Phillies in the NLCS in five games, ending their second consecutive season with a loss to the Phillies, who would go on to lose to the Yankees in the World Series.

During the 2010 season, the Dodgers played against both the Yankees and the Red Sox. The Dodgers managed to only go 1–5 against the two teams. It was the first time Torre had faced either the Yankees or the Red Sox since leaving the Yankees.

On September 17, 2010, Torre announced he would step down as Dodgers manager after the 2010 season, with Mattingly being Torre's replacement for 2011 campaign.

On October 3, 2010, the Dodgers defeated the Arizona Diamondbacks 3–1 at Dodger Stadium for Torre's 2,326th and final career win. Torre stepped down as manager at the conclusion of the game.

== Broadcasting career ==
From 1985 to 1990, Torre worked as a television color commentator for the California Angels. Torre also worked as a color commentator for NBC's Game of the Week telecasts alongside Jay Randolph. While working as a guest analyst for ESPN during the 1989 World Series, Torre was on hand for the Loma Prieta earthquake (October 17, 1989).

== Commissioner's office (2011–present) ==
With a desire to stay active after his managing career, and in spite of his advancing age, Torre accepted a position assisting Major League Baseball Commissioner Bud Selig as the new Executive Vice President for Baseball Operations on February 26, 2011. His stated duties according to the MLB.com biography include serving as the primary liaison for all baseball and on-field activities between the office of the commissioner and the general managers and field managers of all 30 Major League clubs. Other duties include overseeing areas of major league operations, on-field operations, discipline, and umpiring. In December 2014, as part of an executive reorganization, MLB announced Torre's title was modified to Chief Baseball Officer, though his duties remained unchanged.

Torre drew criticism when, during the 10th anniversary of the September 11, 2001 attacks, MLB denied the New York Mets the right to wear tribute caps to first responders, as they had done in the month following the attacks.

Torre briefly resigned from his position with Major League Baseball in January 2012 amid speculation that he was interested in joining one of the groups seeking to buy the Los Angeles Dodgers. The following March, he returned to his position with MLB after his group failed to buy the Dodgers.

Torre was the manager of the USA team in the 2013 World Baseball Classic. On September 22, 2013, he attended a Yankees pregame tribute to Mariano Rivera at Yankee Stadium.

In August 2015, Torre opened dialogue amid concerns about umpiring, the strike zone, and instant replay, by meeting with players and staff of all 30 Major League teams, after Red Sox manager John Farrell had noted an increasing trend of pitches below the strike zone being called strikes. Commented Cardinals manager Mike Matheny, "It's good leadership that he's willing to initiate conversation, ... giving guys a chance [to express any issues they might have], it's impressive. He wasn't ... making excuses for anybody. He said, 'Help me understand how we can help improve.'"

In December 2015, Torre led an expedition to Cuba of MLB officials and players. It was the first of its kind since 1999, and it was intended as a step to help normalize relations with the United States that had begun to ease earlier in the year.

In February 2020, Torre was replaced as head of on-field operations by former pitcher Chris Young and was reassigned as special assistant to the Commissioner. Despite retaining a post in the commissioners result, Torre no longer determined fines and suspensions for on-field incidents.

== Achievements, highlights, honors, and awards ==
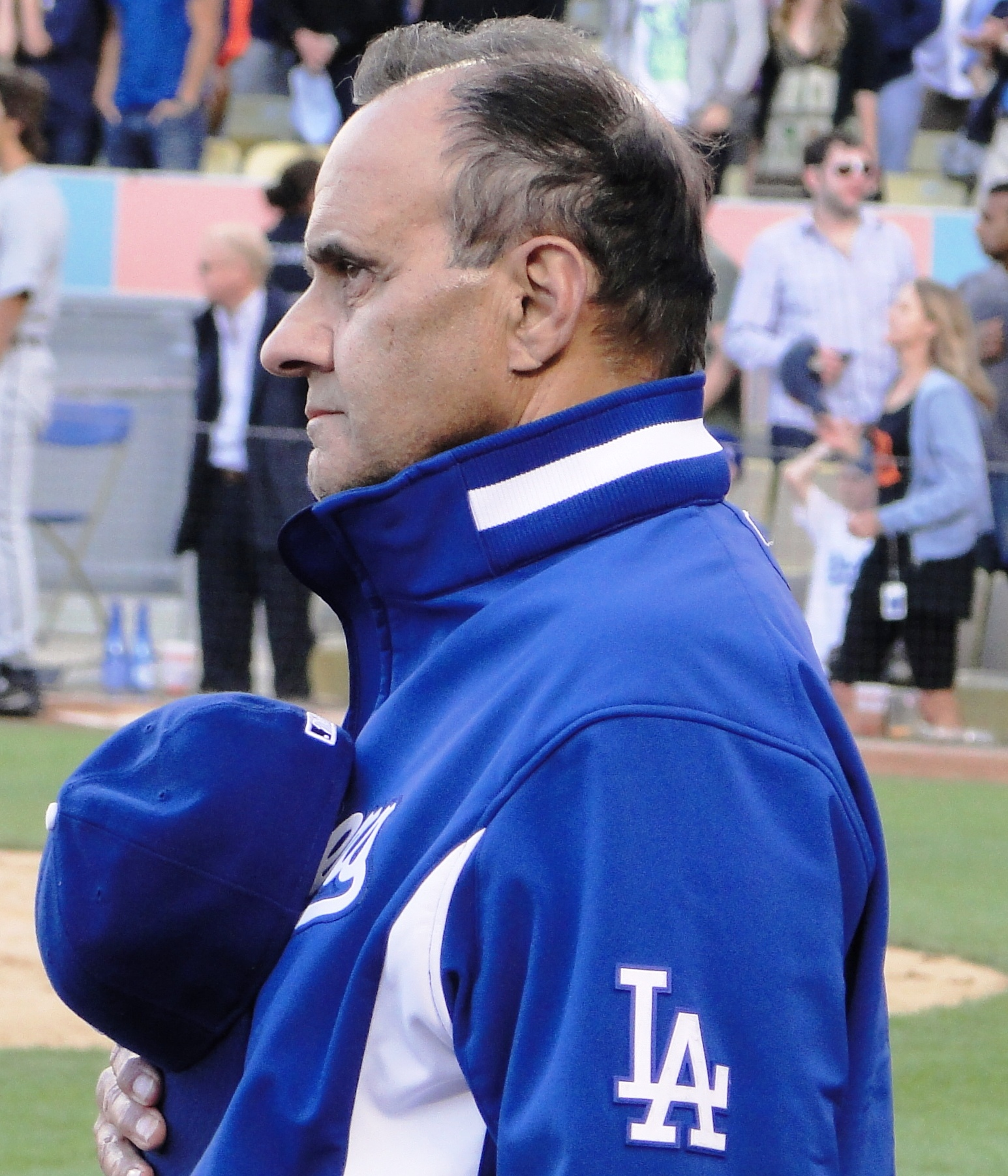
Torre at Dodger Stadium, May 2010

Torre appeared in the Major League Baseball All-Star Game 15 total times as a player or as a manager, with his teams going 13–1–1. During his playing career, he was always on the National League squad, going 8–1. Each time he was manager, it was for the American League, with those teams going 5–0–1.

In 2011, Torre made his first appearance at the New York Yankees' Old Timers' Day. He also appeared in 2012, 2014, and 2015.

The Yankees retired Torre's uniform number 6 on "Joe Torre Day", August 23, 2014, and honored him with a plaque in Monument Park at Yankee Stadium.

On August 27, 2016, the Cardinals inducted Torre into the franchise Hall of Fame.

On July 30, 2022, the Atlanta Braves inducted Torre into the franchise Hall of Fame.

On August 27, 2022, Torre participated in the Mets' Old-Timers' Day (the team's first since 1994) by managing one of the squads.

=== Legacy ===
In an 18-year major league career, Torre played in 2,209 games, accumulating 2,342 hits in 7,874 at bats for a .297 career batting average along with 252 home runs, 1,185 runs batted in, and an on-base percentage of .365. He retired with a .990 fielding percentage in 903 games as a catcher, a .993 fielding percentage in 787 games as a first baseman, and a .951 fielding percentage in 515 games as a third baseman.

During his individual seasons, Torre batted over .300 five times, drove in more than 100 runs five times, and hit 20 or more home runs six times. A nine-time All-Star, he won a Most Valuable Player Award a batting title, and an RBI crown. He finished in the National League's top ten four times each in batting average, on-base percentage, on-base plus slugging percentage, adjusted OPS+, hits, total bases, RBIs, and slugging percentage. Also a Rawlings Gold Glove Award winner at catcher, Torre led National League catchers twice in fielding percentage, and was in the top five in caught stealing percentage. In ten different seasons combined at catcher, first base, and third base, he finished in the top five in fielding percentage. Baseball historian Bill James ranked Torre 11th all-time among major league catchers.

=== Managerial record ===
Torre established a Major League record by guiding his clubs to 14 consecutive World Series wins from Game Three of the 1996 World Series through Game Two of the 2000 championship. He became the second manager to guide his club to 12 consecutive postseason appearances, with Bobby Cox having led the Braves to 14 straight postseason appearances from 1991 through 2005. (There was no postseason in 1994.)

Team	Year	Regular season					Postseason			
Team	Year	Games	Won	Lost	Win %	Finish	Won	Lost	Win %	Result
NYM	1977	117	49	68	.419	6th in NL East	–	–	–	
NYM	1978	162	66	96	.407	6th in NL East	–	–	–	
NYM	1979	162	63	99	.389	6th in NL East	–	–	–	
NYM	1980	162	67	95	.414	5th in NL East	–	–	–	
NYM	1981	51	17	34	.333	5th in NL East	–	–	–	
NYM	1981	52	24	28	.462	4th in NL East	–	–	–	
NYM total		706	286	420	.405		–	–	–	
ATL	1982	162	89	73	.549	1st in NL West	0	3	.000	Lost NLCS (STL)
ATL	1983	162	88	74	.543	2nd in NL West	–	–	–	
ATL	1984	162	80	82	.494	3rd in NL West	–	–	–	
ATL total		486	257	229	.529		0	3	.000	
STL	1990	58	24	34	.414	6th in NL East	–	–	–	
STL	1991	162	84	78	.519	2nd in NL East	–	–	–	
STL	1992	162	83	79	.512	3rd in NL East	–	–	–	
STL	1993	162	87	75	.537	3rd in NL East	–	–	–	
STL	1994	114	53	61	.465	4th in NL Central	–	–	–	
STL	1995	47	20	27	.426	Fired	–	–	–	
STL total		705	351	354	.498		–	–	–	
NYY	1996	162	92	70	.568	1st in AL East	11	4	.733	Won World Series (ATL)
NYY	1997	162	96	66	.593	2nd in AL East	2	3	.400	Lost ALDS (CLE)
NYY	1998	162	114	48	.704	1st in AL East	11	2	.846	Won World Series (SD)
NYY	1999	162	98	64	.605	1st in AL East	11	1	.917	Won World Series (ATL)
NYY	2000	161	87	74	.540	1st in AL East	11	5	.688	Won World Series (NYM)
NYY	2001	160	95	65	.594	1st in AL East	10	7	.588	Lost World Series (ARI)
NYY	2002	161	103	58	.640	1st in AL East	1	3	.250	Lost ALDS (ANA)
NYY	2003	162	101	61	.623	1st in AL East	9	8	.529	Lost World Series (FLA)
NYY	2004	162	101	61	.623	1st in AL East	6	5	.545	Lost ALCS (BOS)
NYY	2005	162	95	67	.586	1st in AL East	2	3	.400	Lost ALDS (LAA)
NYY	2006	162	97	65	.599	1st in AL East	1	3	.250	Lost ALDS (DET)
NYY	2007	162	94	68	.580	2nd in AL East	1	3	.250	Lost ALDS (CLE)
NYY total		1940	1173	767	.605		76	47	.618	
LAD	2008	162	84	78	.519	1st in NL West	4	4	.500	Lost NLCS (PHI)
LAD	2009	162	95	67	.586	1st in NL West	4	4	.500	Lost NLCS (PHI)
LAD	2010	162	80	82	.494	4th in NL West	–	–	–	
LAD total		486	259	227	.533		8	8	.500	
Total		4323	2326	1997	.538		84	58	.592	

=== Awards and honors ===
General reference:

Championships earned or shared
Title	Times	Dates	Ref
American League champion	6	1996, 1998–2001, 2003	
MLB division champion	13	1982, 1996, 1998–2006, 2008, 2009	
National League batting champion	1	1971	
World Series champion	4	1996, 1998–2000	

Honors received
Act of honor bestowed	Date	Ref
National Baseball Hall of Fame inductee	2014	
New York Yankees #6 retired	August 23, 2014	
St. Louis Cardinals Hall of Fame inductee	August 27, 2016	

Awards

- 2× Associated Press Manager of the Year (1982, 1998)
- Baseball Prospectus Internet Baseball Awards for American League Manager of the Year (1998)
- 2× BBWAA American League Manager of the Year (1996, 1998)
- Chuck Tanner Major League Baseball Manager of the Year (2007) – first recipient
- Hutch Award (1971)
- 15× Major League Baseball All-Star
  - 9× as a player (1963–67, 1970–73)
  - 6× as a manager (1997, 1999–2002, 2004)
- National League Most Valuable Player Award (1971)
- 2× National League Player of the Month Award (May 1965, August 1971)
- National League Player of the Week Award (August 8, 1976)
- Rawlings Gold Glove Award at catcher (1965)
- Slocum Award (2008)
- Sporting News Sportsman of the Year (1996)
- Sporting News American League Manager of the Year Award (1998)
- Sporting News Major League Baseball Manager of the Decade (2000–09)
- Sporting News Major League Baseball Player of the Year Award (1971)
- 4× Sporting News National League All-Star team (1964–66, 1971)
- Sports Illustrated Major League Baseball All-Decade Team manager (2000–09)
- Sports Illustrated No. 3 of the Top 10 Coaches/Managers of the Decade in U.S. professional and college sports (2000–09)
- Willie, Mickey and the Duke Award (2002, 2011)
- Doctor of Letters from Skidmore College, 5/18/19.

=== Accomplishments ===
- 5th all-time in MLB history in managerial wins
- Only major leaguer with 2,000 hits as a player and 2,000 wins as a manager

== Film and television appearances ==
Torre appeared as himself in the broadcast booth in the 1990 film Taking Care of Business, which showed a fictional World Series between the Angels and the Chicago Cubs. He appeared as himself in a 1996 episode of Cosby.

In the 1997 TV movie Joe Torre: Curveballs Along the Way, Torre was played by Paul Sorvino.

Torre also was featured as the "Voice of the Yankees' Manager" in the 2006 animated feature Everyone's Hero. Torre's character manages a team that includes a fictional Babe Ruth.

Torre appeared with Willie Randolph in a set of Subway commercials in 2005, highlighting the pun of Subway and the Subway Series which Torre, then as Yankees manager, took part with Randolph, then as Mets manager.

During the 2008 season, Torre appeared in TV ads for State Farm Insurance, poking fun at both himself and at Hollywood stereotypes.

On June 15, 2009, Torre was a guest on The Tonight Show with Conan O'Brien He has made appearances on Sesame Street, Castle, and Gary Unmarried. Torre also appeared as himself in the 2002 Mafia comedy Analyze That starring Robert De Niro and Billy Crystal.

Torre appeared in the 2022 sports documentary The Captain, covering Derek Jeter's life and career.

== Thoroughbred racing horse owner ==
A thoroughbred horse racing enthusiast, Torre is a part owner of several horses. Game On Dude is a retired thoroughbred who is one of the top older handicap horses in the United States. He also was a part-owner of Sis City, winner of the 2005 Ashland Stakes at Keeneland Race Course. Sis City was the dominant three-year-old filly that year until finishing fourth in the May 6 Kentucky Oaks.

However, a few weeks later on June 26, 2005, a thoroughbred named Wild Desert, in which Torre was also a partner, won the $1.0 million Queen's Plate, the first leg of the Canadian Triple Crown. The win was considered controversial, including that Wild Desert had won only three races from twenty career starts, and the Queen's Plate was the only major race win of his career. Wild Desert was also partially owned by Keith Jones, a former NHL player and the current President of Hockey Operations for the Philadelphia Flyers, and Dan Borislow, an entrepreneur and gambler.

A horse named Torre and Zim, was named after Torre and his former bench coach Don Zimmer, as both love horse racing. Homeboykris, who had upset the field by a half-length and won the opening card of the Preakness Stakes on May 21, 2016, collapsed and died on his way back to the stall immediately after the race.

== Books ==
In 1997, Torre's autobiography, Chasing the Dream, was released. Later, he authored an advice book, entitled Joe Torre's Ground Rules for Winners. His third book, The Yankee Years, was released in February 2009. The book, co-authored by Sports Illustrated writer Tom Verducci, details Torre's tenure as manager of the New York Yankees.

== Joe Torre Safe At Home Foundation ==
In 2002, Torre and his wife Ali established the Joe Torre Safe at Home Foundation. In October 2007 the Foundation partnered with the Union City, New Jersey Board of Education and the North Hudson Community Action Corporation (NHCAC) to establish the Foundation's Margaret Place initiative at Union City, New Jersey's José Martí Middle School, with a $325,000 donation from Verizon. It continues to receive yearly funding from that company of up to $65,000. The Foundation's mission is to educate about and to prevent domestic violence. Margaret's Place is named after Torre's mother, who was a victim of verbal and physical abuse at the hands of Torre's New York City Police officer father when Torre was a child. Torre describes his father as a "bully", and, while Torre himself was not a target of his father's violence, he has stated that he never felt safe at home, and that he grew up in fear for his mother, saying, "I always felt responsible for it. I never thought I belonged anywhere. I never felt safe except on the ball field." Margaret's Place is a comprehensive program that provides students with a safe room in school where they can meet with a professional counselor trained in domestic violence intervention and prevention in order to address their home situation and to educate them to understand the impact of domestic violence on the community. The children are also given the opportunity to read, play games, or talk about their experience with others. The program, which is administered by health care professionals from North Hudson Community Action Corp., also includes an anti-violence campaign within the school, and training for teachers and counselors. It has grown to eleven sites in the region, though Union City's is the only such program in New Jersey.

Torre is also a supporter of other anti-domestic violence programs. In September 2008, he recorded a public service announcement and personal voice message in support of the RESPECT! Campaign against domestic violence.

== Personal life ==
He has one son, Michael, by his first wife, Jackie, whom he married in 1963. He has two daughters, Lauren and Cristina, by his second wife, Dani, whom he married in 1968. Both of these marriages ended in divorce. On August 23, 1987, he married Alice (Ali) Wolterman, his third wife. They have a daughter, Andrea.

His older brother Frank was also a Major League Baseball player. Frank died in 2014. His eldest brother Rocco was a New York Police Department officer who died in 1996. His older sister Marguerite was a Roman Catholic nun and teacher, and was the principal of the Nativity of the Blessed Virgin Mary School in Ozone Park, Queens until her death on May 29, 2022. His other sister Rae died in 2015.

Torre was treated for prostate cancer in 1999.

On December 14, 2005, Torre carried the Olympic Flame in Florence, Italy, as part of the torch relay of the 2006 Winter Olympics in Turin, running it 405 meters, and ending up at the Ponte Vecchio.

As of April 2020, Torre and his wife live in Harrison, New York. Until February 2020, they also had a house in Mahopac.

== See also ==
- List of St. Louis Cardinals team records
- List of Major League Baseball All-Star Game managers
- List of Major League Baseball career hits leaders
- List of Major League Baseball career home run leaders
- List of Major League Baseball career runs batted in leaders
- List of Major League Baseball managers with most career ejections
- List of Major League Baseball managerial wins and winning percentage leaders
- List of Major League Baseball player-managers
- List of Major League Baseball players to hit for the cycle
- New York Yankees award winners and league leaders
- St. Louis Cardinals award winners and league leaders

Awards and achievements
Preceded by Bob Gibson; Ferguson Jenkins	Major League Player of the Month; May 1965; August 1971	Succeeded by Vern Law & Willie Stargell; Don Sutton
Preceded by César Tovar	Hitting for the cycle June 27, 1973	Succeeded by Richie Zisk
