= Doug Flynn =

American baseball player (born 1951)

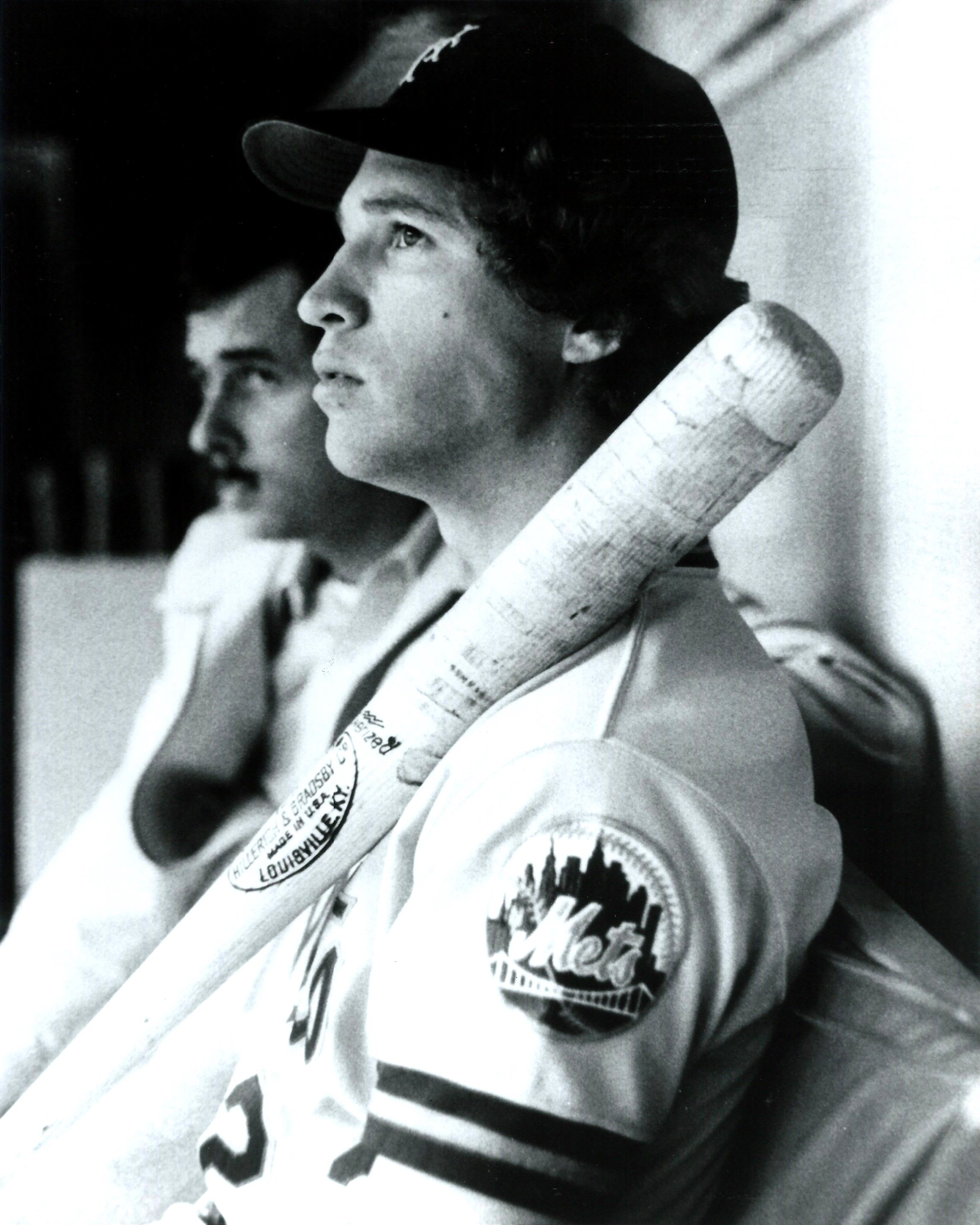
- Flynn in 1978
- Second baseman / Shortstop
- Born: April 18, 1951 (age 75); Lexington, Kentucky, U.S.
- Batted: Right Threw: Right

MLB debut
- April 9, 1975, for the Cincinnati Reds

Last MLB appearance
- October 5, 1985, for the Detroit Tigers

MLB statistics
- Batting average: .238
- Home runs: 7
- Runs batted in: 284
- Stats at Baseball Reference

Teams
- Cincinnati Reds (1975–1977); New York Mets (1977–1981); Texas Rangers (1982); Montreal Expos (1982–1985); Detroit Tigers (1985)

Career highlights and awards
- 2× World Series champion (1975, 1976); Gold Glove Award (1980)

Robert Douglas Flynn Jr. (born April 18, 1951) is an American former professional baseball player. He played in Major League Baseball (MLB) from 1975 to 1985 as an infielder for the Cincinnati Reds, New York Mets, Texas Rangers, Montreal Expos and the Detroit Tigers. Flynn was a member of two world championship winning teams with the Cincinnati Reds and won a Gold Glove Award in 1980 as a member of the New York Mets.

== Early life ==
Flynn was born and raised in Lexington, Kentucky. He attended Bryan Station High School, where he starred in baseball, basketball and football, playing quarterback on a 12–1 team. He went to the University of Kentucky on a combination baseball-basketball scholarship. While attending Kentucky, Flynn and some friends went to a Cincinnati Reds tryout camp in Somerset, Kentucky. Flynn made the cut. After one more tryout camp and yet another audition at Riverfront Stadium, the Reds signed him as an amateur free agent in 1971.

== Playing career ==
=== Cincinnati Reds ===
Flynn batted .245 with six home runs and 113 runs batted in over three seasons in the Reds' farm system. Still, his glove impressed Reds manager Sparky Anderson. Despite having played shortstop predominantly in the minors, Flynn went into Spring training 1975 battling Darrell Chaney, Dan Driessen and John Vukovich for the open third base job.

He made the team, but as a utility infielder, and made his major league debut on April 9 against the Los Angeles Dodgers at short. Starting the following night, Flynn scored his first major league run after reaching on a force play on the fourth inning. Three innings later, he chased Dodgers starter Rick Rhoden out of the game with his first career hit, a single to center.

Flynn batted just .172 with no home runs or RBIs in April. With Reds third basemen batting a combined .162, Anderson shifted perennial All-Star and former National League MVP Pete Rose to third, with George Foster taking over in left. The shift worked, as the team won 108 games that season to storm to a first-place finish in the National League West by twenty games over the Dodgers. The reduced role also seemed to do Flynn's bat some good. Over the rest of the season, Flynn batted .296 with twenty RBI. He hit his first major league home run on May 21 against the New York Mets, a game in which Tom Seaver was the losing pitcher.

Flynn saw semi-regular action early in the 1976 season due to a back injury to Joe Morgan. During a nine-game stretch in June, Flynn batted .382. He ended up appearing in 93 games for the "Big Red Machine", as they became affectionately called, and batted .283 with one home run and twenty RBIs. The Reds won the 1975 and 1976 World Series. Flynn's only postseason appearance came as a defensive replacement in the 1976 National League Championship Series against the Philadelphia Phillies.

Flynn's role with the Reds decreased drastically in 1977. Through June 12, he appeared in 36 games, mostly as a late inning defensive replacement for Rose at third. Meanwhile, Tom Seaver was in a contract dispute with New York Mets chairman M. Donald Grant. On Wednesday, June 15, 1977, Grant traded Seaver to the Cincinnati Reds for Steve Henderson, Dan Norman, Pat Zachry and Flynn.

=== New York Mets ===
Flynn's playing time increased substantially upon his arrival in New York City, even though he batted just .191 with no home runs and fourteen RBIs. Most of his playing time came at short, but he spent time at second base as well. Following the season, the Mets reacquired formed number one overall draft pick Tim Foli to play short. Just as pitchers and catchers were reporting to Spring training, the Mets sold the contract of second baseman Félix Millán to the Taiyo Whales of Nippon Professional Baseball with the intention of using Flynn at second.

He began the season at second, but shifted to short when Foli injured his knee at the end of April, and returned there periodically throughout the remainder of the season. All told, he logged 430 innings at short, committing just seven errors for a .968 fielding percentage. At second, he logged the league's second best fielding percentage (behind the Montreal Expos' Dave Cash) at .986. With the bat, Flynn produced a modest .237 batting average with no home runs and 36 RBIs in the eighth spot of manager Joe Torre's batting order, however, he tied Lenny Randle and Joel Youngblood for the team lead with eight triples.

Flynn's first home run as a Met was a three-run shot off future Hall of Famer Gaylord Perry on May 1, 1979. It was also his only career four RBI game. On June 12, just three days shy of the second anniversary of the "Midnight Massacre", Flynn hit his second home run, an inside-the-park three run homer, against the Reds to cap off a 12-6 Mets victory. Flynn seemed to be at his best against his former club. A week earlier, he doubled in the tying run, and later scored the go-ahead run in the Mets' 5–3 win over Cincinnati, and produced a .310 batting average with seven RBIs against Reds pitching. All told, 1979 was Flynn's best offensive season, as he batted .243 with career highs in home runs (4) and RBIs (61). He also began to emerge as one of the better fielding second basemen in the National League. He led the league in putouts and double plays turned, and was third in the league with a .983 fielding percentage.

On August 5, 1980, Flynn tied a major league record with three triples in one game. He also scored all three times. For the week, he batted .419 (13 for 31) with five runs scored and five RBIs to be named NL Player of the Week. Still, Flynn's greatest contribution to his club was with his glove. His .991 fielding percentage was tops in the league, and earned him the National League Gold Glove Award at second base. He was just the third Met ever to receive this honor (Tommie Agee in 1970 and Bud Harrelson in 1971 being the first two).

Flynn signed a new five-year contract before the 1981 season, but that did not prevent it from being his last season as a Met. With top prospect Wally Backman ready to make the jump to the majors, the Mets traded Flynn to the Texas Rangers with Dan Boitano for Jim Kern at the end of the season. Kern was then packaged with Greg Harris and Alex Treviño for George Foster from the Cincinnati Reds.

=== Rangers, Expos and Tigers ===
Just prior to the start of the 1982 season, the Rangers traded incumbent second baseman Bump Wills to the Chicago Cubs, opening the starting job for Flynn. As the season wore on, rookie prospect Mike Richardt began getting the bulk of the playing time at second with Flynn splitting his time between second and short. The Montreal Expos had used seven different players at second base, and were desperate need of an upgrade at that position when they purchased Flynn's contract from Texas on August 2.

He held the starting second base job with the Expos through 1984. At the 1984 Winter meetings, the Expos acquired third baseman Vance Law from the Chicago White Sox. Law had also played some second and was a shortstop in the minors. The intention was to convert him into a second baseman in Montreal. Once the experiment proved successful, the Expos placed Flynn on waivers. Though the Houston Astros expressed interest, he ended up signing with the Detroit Tigers for the remainder of the 1985 season. He retired from baseball when the Tigers released him in Spring training the following season.

After retirement, Flynn shortly took up slow-pitch softball, playing on several traveling tournament teams in the late 80's and early 90's.

== Career statistics ==
Games	AB	Runs	Hits	2B	3B	HR	RBI	SB	BB	SO	Avg.	OBP	Ch	PO	DP	Fld%
1308	3853	288	918	115	39	7	284	20	151	320	.238	.266	5629	2358	672	.982

== Media career ==
Beginning in 2013, Flynn worked as a part-time radio broadcaster for the Cincinnati Reds, filling in for several games a year when one of their regular complement of broadcasters had some time off. He also appears periodically on Reds' TV broadcasts on FanDuel Sports Network Ohio hosting feature segments. Flynn also appears on Kentucky Wildcats baseball games carried on the SEC Network and SEC Network Plus.

From 2015 until 2022, Flynn hosted Kentucky Life, a long-running weekly half-hour magazine program on Kentucky Educational Television.

== Personal life ==
Flynn's father, Bobby, was a second baseman in the Brooklyn Dodgers' organization in 1948, and later played semi-pro ball with the Lexington Hustlers. While his son was coming up through the Reds' minor league system, Bobby was also climbing politically, serving as Kentucky state senator. His mother also played second base in fast-pitch softball for years. After retirement from baseball, Flynn spent a couple of years working in the Mets minor league system. He then headed up the state of Kentucky's anti-drug program.

Flynn's younger sister, Melanie, went missing in 1977 at the age of 24 and has not been heard from since. The case is heavily featured in the 1990 book The Bluegrass Conspiracy.

His wife, Olga, is a former Philadelphia Eagles cheerleader whom he was set up with by Pete Rose. They were married in February 1982 and they currently live in Lexington, Kentucky. Doug has been a banking officer for Central Bank, a locally owned, independent bank, since 1998.

In 1981, Flynn began singing country songs at Cody's, a club at Sixth Avenue and 16th Street in Manhattan on Monday, Tuesday and Wednesday nights. When baseball went on strike in 1981, Flynn traveled briefly with the Oak Ridge Boys and sang on tour with them. He still loves to sing and pairs up with former Reds teammate Johnny Bench at their successful golf tournament every year on cabaret night. He still attends both New York Mets and Cincinnati Reds reunion events including serving as the Chairman of the Reds Fantasy Camp and guest for the Mets camp.

In early 2010, he faced a bout with thyroid cancer. '"They took my thyroid out, and it did a little damage to my voice box, but I'm doing good", Flynn said later that year, his voice giving away little hint of what's happened.'
