= Dan Norman =

American baseball player (born 1955)

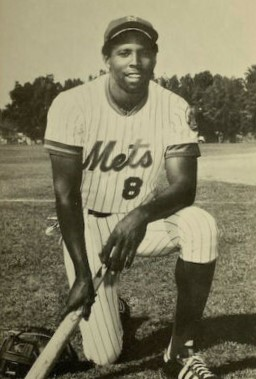
- Right fielder
- Born: January 11, 1955 (age 71); Los Angeles, California, U.S.
- Batted: Right Threw: Right

MLB debut
- September 27, 1977, for the New York Mets

Last MLB appearance
- September 29, 1982, for the Montreal Expos

MLB statistics
- Batting average: .227
- Home runs: 11
- Runs batted in: 37
- Stats at Baseball Reference

Teams
- New York Mets (1977–1980); Montreal Expos (1982)

Daniel Edmund Norman (born January 11, 1955) is an American former professional baseball right fielder who played for the New York Mets and Montreal Expos of Major League Baseball (MLB). His professional career started in the Cincinnati Reds organization but he never played a major league game for the Reds.

== Cincinnati Reds ==
After playing at Barstow College, Norman was drafted by the Cincinnati Reds in the 15th round of the 1974 amateur draft. He was the 357th overall selection.

After signing with the Reds, Norman joined the Billings Mustangs of the Pioneer League, the Reds' rookie league affiliate. One of his teammates on the Mustangs was the Reds 5th round draft choice, left fielder Steve Henderson, whose career often intersected Norman's. In 68 games for the Mustangs in 1974, Norman put up an impressive batting average of .297 and a slugging percentage of .441.

In 1975, Norman was promoted to the Reds' class A affiliate, the Tampa Tarpons of the Florida State League. Playing again alongside Henderson, Norman played 129 games with a batting average of .273 and a slugging percentage of .393.

In 1976, Norman was promoted to the Reds' class AA affiliate, the Trois-Rivières (Three Rivers) Aigles of the Eastern League. There (once again playing alongside Henderson) Norman played 134 games, repeating his batting average from 1975 of .273, and putting up a slugging percentage of .454.

This earned Norman a promotion to the Reds' AAA affiliate, the Indianapolis Indians of the American Association for the 1977 season. Through June 15, 1977, Norman, again playing alongside Henderson, played 60 games for the Indians, with a batting average of .249 and a slugging percentage of .411. On June 15, 1977, Norman and Henderson were traded from the Reds to the New York Mets, along with infielder Doug Flynn and pitcher Pat Zachry in exchange for star pitcher Tom Seaver. Met fans still refer to events of that night as "The Midnight Massacre", mourning the loss of both Hall of Fame pitcher Seaver and home run leader Dave Kingman in trades that night.

== New York Mets ==
Although Henderson was immediately promoted to the Mets major league team, Norman was sent to the Mets AAA affiliate, the Tidewater Tides of the International League. In 80 games with the Tides Norman posted a batting average of .264, and on-base percentage of .344 and a slugging percentage of .435. Norman was called up to the Mets late in the season, making his Major League debut with the Mets on September 27, 1977, against the Pittsburgh Pirates. In total he played 7 games for the Mets in 1977, getting 4 hits in 16 at-bats for a .250 batting average. He also drew 4 walks, giving him an on-base percentage of .400.

Norman spent the 1978 and 1979 seasons alternating between Tidewater and the Mets. In 1978 he played 19 games for the Mets, getting his first Major League home run, and posting a batting average of .266, an on-base percentage of .284 and a slugging percentage of .484. In 1979 he played 44 games with the Mets, with a batting average of .245, an on-base percentage of .311 and a slugging percentage of .373.

1980 was Norman's only complete season in the Major Leagues. He played in 69 games for the Mets, but his batting average was a poor .185. With just 2 home runs and 6 walks, both his on-base percentage and slugging percentage were under .300. He was demoted back to Tidewater for the 1981 season.

Norman played 40 games for Tidewater in 1981, with a batting average of .247. On May 29, 1981, he was traded along with pitcher Jeff Reardon to the Montreal Expos in exchange for right fielder Ellis Valentine.

== Montreal Expos ==
Norman spent the latter part of the 1981 season playing for the Montreal Expos AAA affiliate, the Denver Bears of the American Association. He played in 73 games for Denver with 11 home runs, a batting average of .272, an on-base percentage of .348 and a slugging percentage of .490.

In 1982 Norman split his time between the Expos Major League team and their new AAA affiliate, the Wichita Aeros. He played in 53 games for the Expos, getting 66 at-bats. With a batting average of just .212, that was Norman's last season in the Major Leagues. He continued to bounce around the minor leagues through the 1987 season, ending his professional career at age 32.
