= Mike Phillips (baseball) =

American baseball player (born 1950)

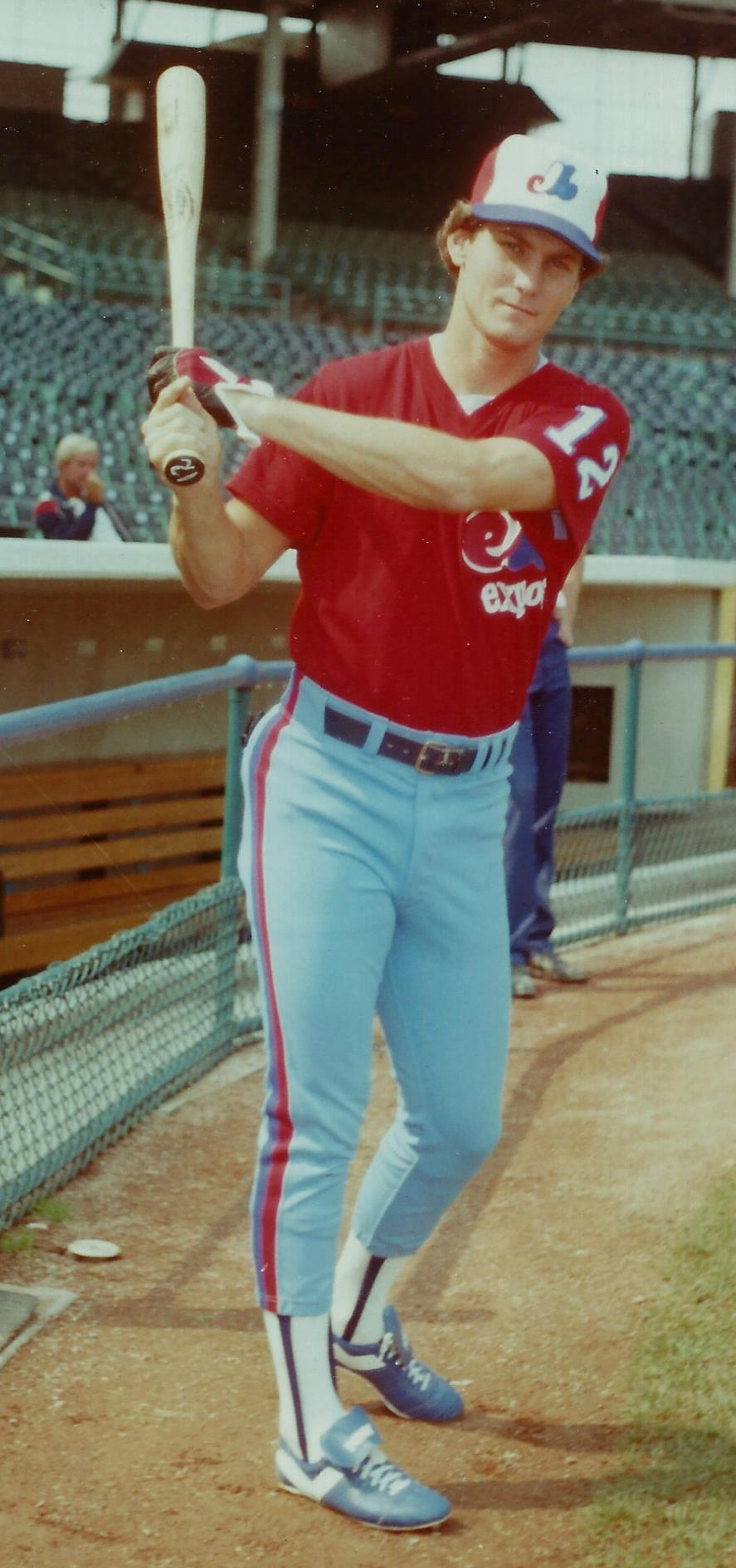
- Phillips as a Montreal Expo
- Infielder
- Born: August 19, 1950 (age 74); Beaumont, Texas, U.S.
- Batted: Left Threw: Right

MLB debut
- April 15, 1973, for the San Francisco Giants

Last MLB appearance
- June 12, 1983, for the Montreal Expos

MLB statistics
- Batting average: ..240
- Home runs: 11
- Runs batted in: 145
- Stats at Baseball Reference

Teams
- San Francisco Giants (1973–1975); New York Mets (1975–1977); St. Louis Cardinals (1977–1980); San Diego Padres (1981); Montreal Expos (1981–1983)

Michael Dwaine Phillips (born August 19, 1950), is an American former professional baseball player, a shortstop, second baseman, and third baseman who appeared in 712 Major League games from 1973 to 1983 for the San Francisco Giants, New York Mets, St. Louis Cardinals, San Diego Padres, and Montreal Expos. Phillips batted left-handed, threw right-handed, stood 6 feet (1.8 m) tall and weighed 170 pounds (77 kg).

== Career ==
Born in Beaumont, Texas, Phillips attended MacArthur High School in Irving, Texas, and was selected by the Giants in the first round (18th pick overall) of the 1969 Major League Baseball draft. After four years of seasoning in the Giants' farm system, he made the Major Leagues in 1973 and was largely a utility infielder during his career, although in 1975 he was the Mets' regular shortstop, appearing in 116 games when the club's longtime starter at the position, Bud Harrelson, was injured. Phillips hit for the cycle on June 25, 1976, while playing for the Mets in a 7–4 victory over the Chicago Cubs. He was dealt from the Mets to the Cardinals for Joel Youngblood at the trade deadline on June 15, 1977.

Phillips registered 416 hits, including 46 doubles, 24 triples, and 11 home runs, during his MLB career.

== Post-playing career ==
After his retirement as a player, Phillips worked for Dallas radio station KRLD in sports marketing for nine years, for the Texas Rangers in corporate sponsorships for five years, and for the Kansas City Royals in corporate sales for seven years.

In 2015, Phillips was inducted into the Irving Independent School District Athletic Hall of Fame.

== See also ==
- List of Major League Baseball players to hit for the cycle

Achievements
Preceded by Larry Hisle	Hitting for the cycle June 25, 1976	Succeeded by Lyman Bostock
