= Pat Zachry =

American baseball player (1952–2024)

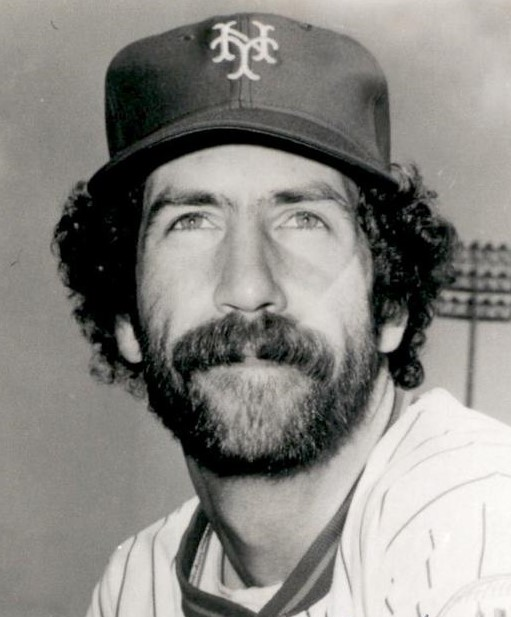
- Zachry in 1978
- Pitcher
- Born: April 24, 1952; Richmond, Texas, U.S.
- Died: April 4, 2024 (aged 71); Austin, Texas, U.S.
- Batted: Right Threw: Right

MLB debut
- April 11, 1976, for the Cincinnati Reds

Last MLB appearance
- May 29, 1985, for the Philadelphia Phillies

MLB statistics
- Win–loss record: 69–67
- Earned run average: 3.52
- Strikeouts: 669
- Stats at Baseball Reference

Teams
- Cincinnati Reds (1976–1977); New York Mets (1977–1982); Los Angeles Dodgers (1983–1984); Philadelphia Phillies (1985)

Career highlights and awards
- All-Star (1978); World Series champion (1976); NL Rookie of the Year (1976)

Patrick Paul Zachry (April 24, 1952 – April 4, 2024) was an American professional baseball pitcher. He pitched in Major League Baseball for the Cincinnati Reds, New York Mets, Los Angeles Dodgers, and Philadelphia Phillies from 1976 to 1985.

With the Reds, Zachry won the Major League Baseball Rookie of the Year Award for his play in the National League in 1976. He was a member of the 1976 World Series champions. The Reds included Zachry in their trade to the Mets for Tom Seaver in one of the Mets' "Midnight Massacre" trades. Zachry was named an MLB All-Star in 1978. After pitching for the Mets through 1982, he pitched for the Dodgers in 1983 and 1984 and for the Phillies in 1985.

== Early life and career ==
Zachry was born on April 24, 1952, in Richmond, Texas, and grew up in Waco. He attended Richfield High School in Waco.

== Playing career ==
=== Cincinnati Reds ===
The Cincinnati Reds selected Zachry in the 19th round of the 1970 Major League Baseball draft. In six seasons in their farm system, he compiled a 54–42 win–loss record with a 3.00 earned run average (ERA) and 619 strikeouts. While a member of the Tampa Tarpons in 1971, Zachry received notice of his military draft eligibility, but he failed the U.S. Army's physical examination due a severe childhood injury to his leg.

At the Winter Meetings after the 1975 season, the reigning World Series champion Reds traded starting pitcher Clay Kirby to the Montreal Expos for third baseman Bob Bailey in order to make room in their starting rotation for Zachry. He made his major league debut on April 11, 1976 as a relief pitcher; the Reds moved him into the starting rotation shortly afterward. On May 28, he shut out the Los Angeles Dodgers to improve to 4–0 with a 1.17 ERA. For the season, Zachry compiled a 14–7 record, 2.74 ERA, and a team leading 143 strikeouts in 204 innings pitched. In the postseason, Zachry won Game 2 of the National League Championship Series (NLCS) against the Philadelphia Phillies in Veterans Stadium, and won game three of the 1976 World Series opposing the New York Yankees at Yankee Stadium.

The Big Red Machine became the first team to sweep the entire post-season since the League Championship Series debuted in 1969, en route to winning their second consecutive world championship. After the season, Zachry had a hernia operation, and was in the process of recovering when he and San Diego Padres closer Butch Metzger were named co-winners of the National League (NL) Rookie of the Year Award. It was the first time in major league history co-winners of the award were named.

The hernia, coupled with a sore elbow, delayed Zachry's 1977 Spring training, and denied him the opening day start. He did not pitch until the fifth game of the season against the Houston Astros. He gave up three runs in his first inning of work. In the month of May, Zachry was 0–4 with a 9.85 ERA. Following an 8–0 loss to Tom Seaver and the New York Mets at Shea Stadium on June 7, Zachry had a 3–7 record with a 5.04 ERA.

=== New York Mets ===
Tom Seaver, meanwhile, engaged in a contract dispute with Mets chairman M. Donald Grant, and had requested a trade. On June 15, 1977, the Reds traded Zachry, Doug Flynn, Steve Henderson, and Dan Norman to the Mets in exchange for Seaver; Zachry was considered the "principal figure" acquired by the Mets in the deal. Over the rest of the season, Zachry went 7–6 with a 3.76 ERA, and was the only Mets starting pitcher to post a winning record besides Seaver (7–3).

After defeating his former club on April 30, he finished the first month of the 1978 season with a 3–0 record and 1.85 ERA. A complete game victory over the Dodgers on June 7 improved his record to 7–1, and Zachry was selected as the sole Mets representative on the NL All-Star team, though he did not appear in the game.

On July 24, the Cincinnati Reds came to Shea Stadium with Pete Rose entering the game with a 36-game hitting streak. Zachry held Rose hitless in his first three at-bats, but Rose ultimately tied Tommy Holmes' N.L. record 37 game streak with a single to left in the seventh inning. Four batters later, Zachry was pulled in favor of Kevin Kobel. Frustrated, Zachry went to kick a batting helmet sitting on the dugout steps, missed, and kicked the step. He suffered contusions in his left foot, and left on crutches. He was lost for the remainder of the season.

In 1980, Zachry logged 164 2/3 innings pitched. His 3.01 ERA was tops among Mets starters, although lack of run support led to his 6–10 record. On July 25 and July 30, Zachry shut out his opponent in consecutive starts. His streak would have hit three were it not for three unearned runs in the eighth inning of his next start.

Before the 1981 season, Zachry and the Mets signed a five-year contract worth $2 million. He shut out the Chicago Cubs at Wrigley Field in the 1981 season opener. He won each of his first three starts, but then fell into a five-game losing streak in which his ERA was 6.93, and opposing batters hit .330. His record stood at 5–7 with a 4.16 ERA when the players' strike interrupted the season. On the first day of the strike, Zachry's wife, Sharron, gave birth to their son. Zachry finished the season with a 7–14 record and a 4.14 ERA. The 14 losses tied with Steve Mura of the Padres for the most in the NL.

In his first start of the 1982 season, Zachry took a no-hitter into the eighth inning. He walked lead-off batter Keith Moreland, retired the next two batters, walked Tye Waller, and then pinch hitter Bob Molinaro hit a single to right to break up the no-hitter and the shutout. The Cubs scored four runs that inning, only one of them earned. New Mets manager George Bamberger used Zachry as both a starter and reliever in 1982. He went 2–3 with a 2.11 ERA as a reliever, and earned his first career save on August 15 against the Cubs.

=== Los Angeles Dodgers ===
After the 1982 season, the Mets traded Zachry to the Dodgers for Jorge Orta. In his two seasons with the Dodgers, Zachry pitched exclusively in relief, except for one emergency start made in the second game of a doubleheader against the Mets at Shea on August 30, 1983; he held his former team scoreless for six innings. He ended his first season in Los Angeles with a 6–1 record and 2.49 ERA, and returned to the post-season for the first time since his rookie season. He appeared in Games 3 and 4 of the NLCS, both won by the Phillies by final scores of 7–2. In four total innings pitched, he allowed one earned run and four hits, while striking out two.

For the 1984 season, he went 5–6 with two saves and a 3.81 ERA.

=== Philadelphia Phillies ===
Before the 1985 season, the Dodgers traded Zachry to the Phillies for slugging first baseman Al Oliver. With Kent Tekulve and Don Carman already in their bullpen, Zachry's role with the Phillies was very limited. After just ten appearances (mostly in losses), Zachry was released by the Phillies in June 1985 with no decisions and a 4.26 ERA.

== Coaching career ==
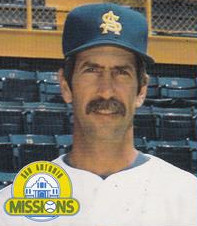
Zachry coached the San Antonio Missions in 1988

Unable to sign with another team, Zachry retired and went into coaching, working in the Dodgers organization for the Vero Beach Dodgers and the San Antonio Missions. In 1989, he played in the Senior Professional Baseball Association. He was profiled in a book by Peter Golenbock about the league.

== Later life and death ==
On November 21, 2016, Zachry was injured and his wife, Sharron, was killed in a car crash on Interstate 35 in Texas.

Zachry's teammate, Johnny Bench, reported that Zachry died on April 4, 2024. He was 71. According to the Mets, Zachry died at his son's home in Austin, Texas, following a lengthy illness.
