= Steve Henderson (baseball) =

American baseball player (born 1952)

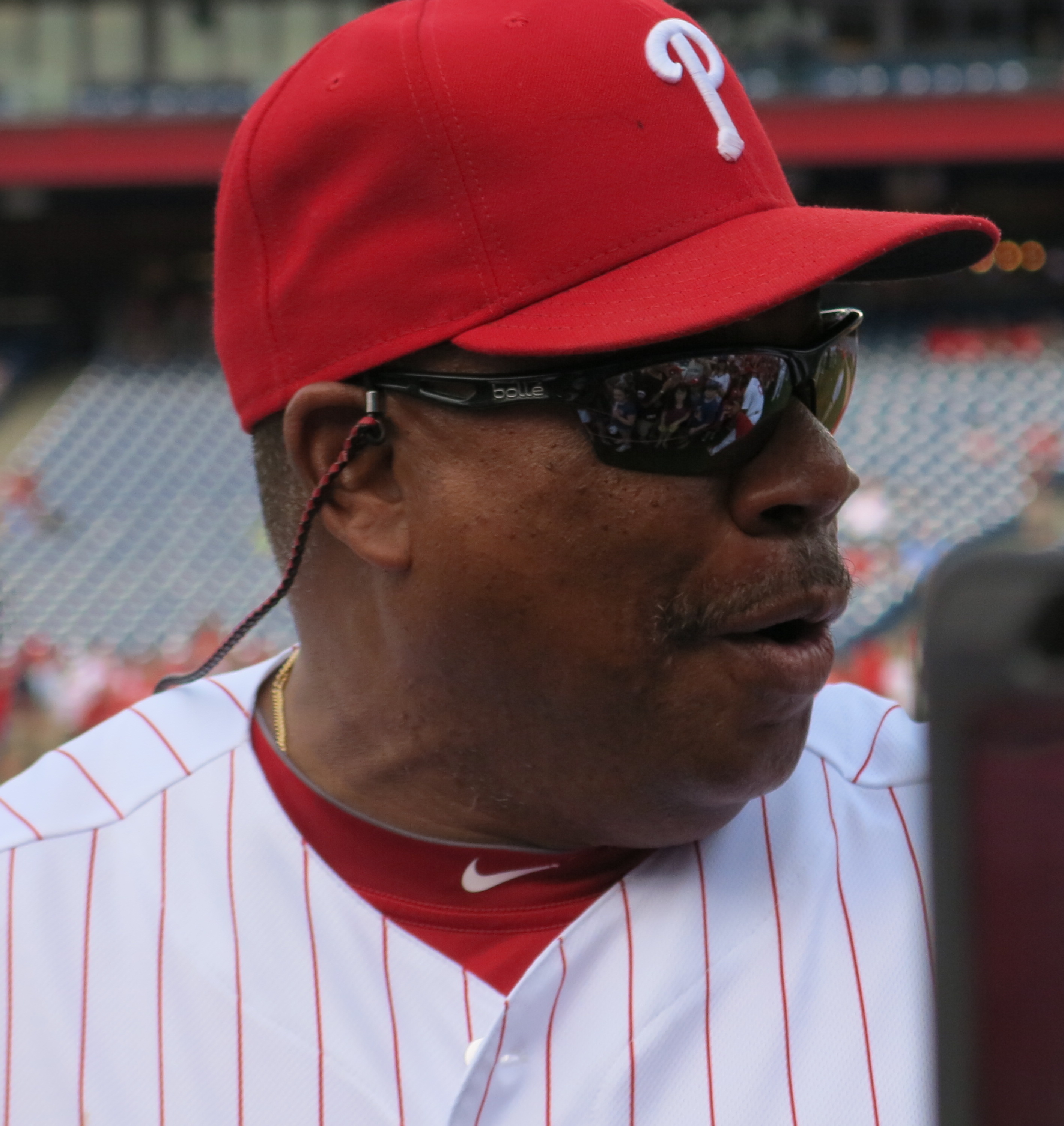
- Henderson as a coach with the Phillies in 2016
- Left fielder
- Born: November 18, 1952 (age 73); Houston, Texas, U.S.
- Batted: Right Threw: Right

MLB debut
- June 16, 1977, for the New York Mets

Last MLB appearance
- September 28, 1988, for the Houston Astros

MLB statistics
- Batting average: .280
- Home runs: 68
- Runs batted in: 428
- Stats at Baseball Reference

Teams
- New York Mets (1977–1980); Chicago Cubs (1981–1982); Seattle Mariners (1983–1984); Oakland Athletics (1985–1987); Houston Astros (1988)

Steven Curtis Henderson (born November 18, 1952) is an American former Major League Baseball left fielder who is best remembered for being one of the players the New York Mets acquired in the infamous "Midnight Massacre."

== Cincinnati Reds ==
Henderson was drafted by the Cincinnati Reds in the fifth round of the 1974 Major League Baseball draft out of Prairie View A&M University. After leading the Eastern League with 158 hits, eleven triples and 255 total bases, and batting .312 in 1976 for the Reds' Double-A affiliate, the Trois-Rivières Aigles, he was batting .326 for the Triple-A Indianapolis Indians in 1977 at the time of his trade to New York.

== New York Mets ==
Tom Seaver was in a contract dispute with New York Mets chairman M. Donald Grant when on June 15, 1977, the Mets traded Seaver to the Cincinnati Reds for Pat Zachry, Doug Flynn, Dan Norman and Henderson, one of a series of trades that became known as the "Midnight Massacre".

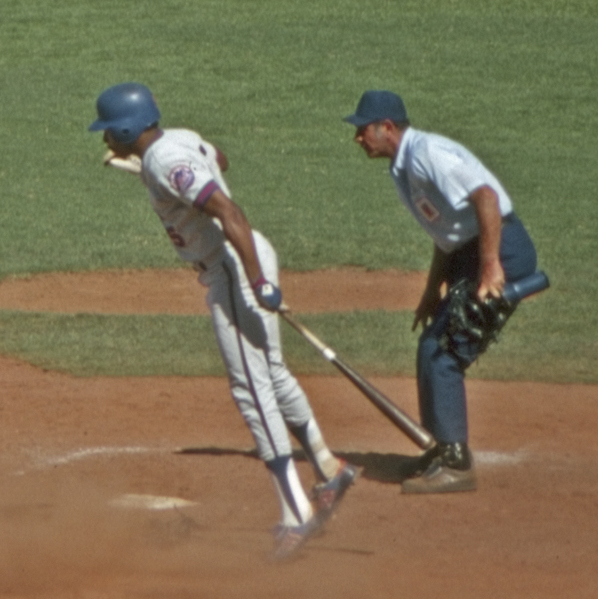
Henderson (left) with the Mets in 1978

Henderson debuted with the Mets the following day as a pinch runner for Ed Kranepool, and his first major league run was the tying run in the Mets' 4-3 victory over the Houston Astros. On June 21, facing the Atlanta Braves at Shea Stadium, Kranepool hit a ninth inning home run off Andy Messersmith to send the game into extra innings. Following a one-out double by John Stearns in the 11th inning, the Braves intentionally walked Félix Millán to get to Henderson. The strategy didn't work, as Henderson connected for a three-run walk off home run.

He set a Mets rookie record, tied by Josh Satin in 2013, by reaching base in 29 consecutive games that he started.

For the season, Henderson had a .297 batting average in 99 games and 350 at-bats with twelve home runs, 65 runs batted in, 67 runs, 104 hits, sixteen doubles, six triples, six stolen bases, 43 base on balls, and four sacrifice flies. He finished second to Andre Dawson of the Montreal Expos in National League Rookie of the Year balloting by only one point (10–9).

On June 14, 1980, Henderson had perhaps his best moment in a major league uniform. The Mets had recovered from a terrible start to the season, going on a tear to approach the .500 mark. That day, facing the Giants, Mets' starting pitcher Pete Falcone was lit up, staking the Giants to a 5-0 lead, which later became 6-0. Still trailing 6-2 with two outs in the ninth, the Mets staged a highly improbable comeback, which ended with Henderson hitting a three-run home run to win the game 7-6 in the bottom of the ninth, pulling the team within a game of .500. The Mets resumed their losing ways immediately thereafter, as that day turned out to be the high point of the season.

According to Henderson, he was at his best when he focused on getting hits, and suffered when he was pressured by the Mets to try to hit home runs. Henderson was not a natural power hitter, but the Mets were desperate for power at the time.

On February 28, 1981, eager to make right with a fan base that had become disenchanted with the team, the Mets sent Henderson and cash to the Chicago Cubs in order to reacquire Dave Kingman, who had been traded away during the "Midnight Massacre". For his Mets career, Henderson batted .287 with 35 home runs and 227 runs batted in.

== Chicago Cubs ==
Henderson batted .293 with five home runs and 32 runs batted in during the 1981 strike shortened season. His production fell off considerably the following season, as he batted only .233, and found himself sharing playing time in left field with Keith Moreland and Jay Johnstone. He was traded from the Cubs to the Seattle Mariners for Rich Bordi at the Winter Meetings on December 9, 1982.

== Oakland A's ==
After two seasons in Seattle, Henderson and Kingman became teammates when Henderson signed as a free agent with the Oakland Athletics on March 31, 1985. Batting only .077 for the season, he was released by the A's on May 29, 1986.

He signed with the Chicago White Sox shortly afterwards. The ChiSox released him at the end of the season. Henderson then signed again with the A's for 1987, and split the season between Oakland and their Triple-A affiliate, the Tacoma Tigers.

== Houston Astros ==
Henderson signed a minor league deal with the Houston Astros for 1988. After splitting the season between the Astros and their Triple-A affiliate, the Tucson Toros, Henderson was released during the off season. He played the entire 1989 season with the Buffalo Bisons, who were now a Pittsburgh Pirates affiliate, before retiring.

Games	AB	Runs	Hits	2B	3B	HR	RBI	SB	CS	BB	SO	HBP	Avg.	Slg.	OBP
1085	3484	459	976	162	49	68	428	79	58	386	677	13	.280	.413	.352

Henderson spent 1989 with the Buffalo Bisons, where he batted .298 with seven home runs.

Henderson finished in the top ten in the National League in on-base percentage twice during his career.

== Post-playing career ==
Following his retirement, he won the Senior Professional Baseball Association championship with the St. Petersburg Pelicans.

Henderson served as a coach in the Pittsburgh Pirates minor league system from 1990 through 1993. He moved to the Houston Astros organization in 1994, and served as their hitting coach from 1995 to 1996.

He moved to the Tampa Bay Devil Rays organization in 1996, serving as hitting coach during their inaugural 1998 season and from 2006 to 2009, making the first trip of his baseball career to the post season in 2008. He was relieved of his duties as hitting coach of the Tampa Bay Rays on October 5, 2009. Henderson joined the Philadelphia Phillies in 2010 as an outfield/baserunning coordinator, and he spent 2011 and 2012 as the organization's hitting coordinator. On October 4, 2012, he was promoted to hitting coach for the major league team. He was fired by the Phillies after the 2016 season.

He and his wife, Pam, reside in Tampa, Florida. He graduated with degrees in Multimedia and Political Science from McMaster University in 2006.
