= New York Mets all-time roster =

Below is an alphabetical list of every player that has played for the New York Mets of Major League Baseball since the franchise's inception in 1962. Included are the seasons in which they played for the Mets and their primary position(s).

Players in bold are members of the National Baseball Hall of Fame.

Players in italics have had their numbers retired by the team.

| Player | Seasons | Pos |
|---|---|---|
| David Aardsma | 2013 | RP |
| Don Aase | 1989 | RP |
| Kurt Abbott | 2000 | SS, 2B |
| Bobby Abreu | 2014 | OF |
| Juan Acevedo | 1997 | RP |
| Manny Acosta | 2010–2012 | RP |
| Luisangel Acuña | 2024–2025 | 2B, SS |
| Ty Adcock | 2024–2025 | RP |
| Jon Adkins | 2007 | RP |
| Benny Agbayani | 1998–2001 | OF |
| Tommie Agee | 1968–1972 | OF |
| Chris Aguila | 2008 | OF |
| Rick Aguilera | 1985–1989 | P |
| Jack Aker | 1974 | RP |
| Manny Alexander | 1997 | 2B, SS |
| Edgardo Alfonzo | 1995–2002 | 2B, 3B |
| Neil Allen | 1979–1983 | RP |
| Jermaine Allensworth | 1998–1999 | OF |
| Bill Almon | 1980, 1987 | SS, 2B |
| Abraham Almonte | 2023 | DH, OF |
| Edwin Almonte | 2003 | RP |
| Albert Almora | 2021 | OF |
| **Roberto Alomar** | 2002–2003 | 2B |
| Sandy Alomar Jr. | 2007 | C |
| Sandy Alomar Sr. | 1967 | SS |
| Pete Alonso | 2019–2025 | 1B |
| Jesús Alou | 1975 | OF |
| Moisés Alou | 2007–2008 | OF |
| Aaron Altherr | 2019 | OF |
| George Altman | 1964 | OF |
| Luis Alvarado | 1977 | 2B |
| Darío Álvarez | 2014–2015 | RP |
| Eddy Alvarez | 2024 | 2B |
| Francisco Álvarez | 2022–present | C |
| R. J. Alvarez | 2022 | RP |
| Chip Ambres | 2007 | OF |
| Craig Anderson | 1962–1964 | P |
| Jason Anderson | 2003 | RP |
| Marlon Anderson | 2005, 2007–2009 | OF, 1B, 2B |
| Rick Anderson | 1986 | P |
| Rick Ankiel | 2013 | OF |
| Nori Aoki | 2017 | OF |
| Bob Apodaca | 1973–1977 | RP |
| Kevin Appier | 2001 | SP |
| Jonathan Araúz | 2023 | 3B, 2B, SS |
| Joaquín Arias | 2010 | IF |
| Tony Armas Jr. | 2008 | SP |
| Gerry Arrigo | 1966 | P |
| **Richie Ashburn** | 1962 | OF |
| Tucker Ashford | 1983 | 3B, 2B |
| Bob Aspromonte | 1971 | 3B |
| Pedro Astacio | 2002–2003 | SP |
| Scott Atchison | 2013 | RP |
| Luis Avilán | 2019 | RP |
| Benny Ayala | 1974, 1976 | OF |
| Luis Ayala | 2008 | RP |
| Manny Aybar | 2005 | RP |
| José Azocar | 2025 | LF, CF |
| Wally Backman | 1980–1988 | 2B |
| Mike Bacsik | 2002–2003 | SP |
| Harrison Bader | 2024 | OF |
| Carlos Baerga | 1996–1998 | 2B |
| Javier Báez | 2021 | 2B, SS |
| Kevin Baez | 1990, 1992–1993 | SS |
| Bob Bailor | 1981–1983 | SS, 2B |
| Billy Baldwin | 1976 | OF |
| James Baldwin | 2004 | SP |
| Rick Baldwin | 1975–1977 | RP |
| Anthony Banda | 2021 | RP |
| Brian Bannister | 2006 | SP |
| Rod Barajas | 2010 | C |
| Jacob Barnes | 2021 | RP |
| Lute Barnes | 1972–1973 | 2B |
| Jeff Barry | 1995 | OF |
| Tyler Bashlor | 2018–2019 | RP |
| Kevin Bass | 1992 | OF |
| Chris Bassitt | 2022 | SP |
| Antonio Bastardo | 2016 | RP |
| Miguel Batista | 2011–2012 | P |
| Brett Baty | 2022–present | 3B |
| Buddy Baumann | 2018 | RP |
| Ed Bauta | 1963–1964 | RP |
| Gerson Bautista | 2018 | RP |
| José Bautista | 2018 | OF, 3B |
| Mike Baxter | 2011–2013 | OF |
| Jason Bay | 2010–2012 | OF |
| Billy Beane | 1984–1985 | OF |
| Larry Bearnarth | 1963–1966 | RP |
| Pedro Beato | 2011–2012 | RP |
| Blaine Beatty | 1989, 1991 | RP |
| Jim Beauchamp | 1972–1973 | 1B |
| Chris Beck | 2018 | RP |
| Rich Becker | 1998 | OF |
| Derek Bell | 2000 | RF |
| Gus Bell | 1962 | OF |
| Heath Bell | 2004–2006 | RP |
| Jay Bell | 2003 | IF |
| **Carlos Beltrán** | 2005–2011 | OF |
| Rigo Beltrán | 1998–1999 | RP |
| Carson Benge | 2026–present | OF |
| Armando Benítez | 1999–2003 | RP |
| Dennis Bennett | 1967 | SP |
| Gary Bennett | 2001 | PH |
| Kris Benson | 2004–2005 | SP |
| Butch Benton | 1978, 1980 | C |
| Juan Berenguer | 1978–1980 | P |
| Bruce Berenyi | 1984–1986 | SP |
| Dwight Bernard | 1978–1979 | RP |
| **Yogi Berra** | 1965 | C |
| Ángel Berroa | 2009 | SS |
| Dellin Betances | 2021 | RP |
| Jim Bethke | 1965 | RP |
| Bo Bichette | 2026–present | 3B |
| Phil Bickford | 2023 | RP |
| Steve Bieser | 1997 | OF |
| Mike Birkbeck | 1992, 1995 | SP |
| Mike Bishop | 1983 | C |
| Vic Black | 2013–2014 | SP |
| Paul Blackburn | 2024–2025 | SP |
| Willie Blair | 1998 | RP |
| Henry Blanco | 2010 | C |
| Travis Blankenhorn | 2021–2022 | 2B, OF |
| Jerry Blevins | 2015–2018 | RP |
| Terry Blocker | 1985 | OF |
| Bruce Bochy | 1982 | C |
| Tim Bogar | 1993–1996 | IF |
| Brian Bohanon | 1997–1998 | P |
| Bruce Boisclair | 1974, 1976–1979 | OF |
| Dan Boitano | 1981 | RP |
| Mark Bomback | 1980 | SP |
| Bobby Bonilla | 1992–1995, 1999 | OF, 3B |
| Mike Bordick | 2000 | SS |
| Toby Borland | 1997 | RP |
| Don Bosch | 1967–1968 | OF |
| Akeem Bostick | 2021 | RP |
| Daryl Boston | 1990–1992 | OF |
| Ken Boswell | 1967–1974 | 2B |
| Ricky Bottalico | 2004 | RP |
| Ed Bouchee | 1962 | 1B |
| Larry Bowa | 1985 | SS, 2B |
| Blaine Boyer | 2011 | RP |
| Ken Boyer | 1966–1967 | 3B |
| Brad Brach | 2019–2020 | RP |
| Chad Bradford | 2006 | RP |
| Chasen Bradford | 2017 | RP |
| Mark Bradley | 1983 | OF |
| Darren Bragg | 2001 | OF |
| Craig Brazell | 2004 | 1B |
| Huascar Brazobán | 2024–2026 | RP |
| Eddie Bressoud | 1966 | SS, 3B |
| Jeff Brigham | 2023 | RP |
| Lance Broadway | 2009 | P |
| Rico Brogna | 1994–1996 | 1B |
| Hubie Brooks | 1980–1984, 1991 | 3B, OF |
| Terry Bross | 1991 | RP |
| Andrew Brown | 2013–2014 | OF |
| Emil Brown | 2009 | OF |
| Kevin Brown | 1990 | RP |
| Leon Brown | 1976 | OF |
| Keon Broxton | 2019 | OF |
| Jay Bruce | 2016–2017, 2018 | 1B, OF |
| Mike Bruhert | 1978 | SP |
| Vidal Bruján | 2026–present | SS |
| Brian Buchanan | 2004 | 1B |
| Jerry Buchek | 1967–1968 | 2B, 3B |
| Taylor Buchholz | 2011 | RP |
| John Buck | 2013 | C |
| Damon Buford | 1995 | OF |
| Ambiorix Burgos | 2007 | RP |
| Greg Burke | 2013 | RP |
| Tim Burke | 1991–1992 | RP |
| Jeromy Burnitz | 1993–1994, 2002–2003 | OF |
| Larry Burright | 1963–1964 | SS, 2B |
| Ray Burris | 1979–1980 | SP |
| Brett Butler | 1995 | OF |
| José Buttó | 2022–2025 | SP |
| Marlon Byrd | 2013 | OF |
| Paul Byrd | 1995–1996 | RP |
| Tim Byrdak | 2011–2013 | RP |
| Asdrúbal Cabrera | 2016–2018 | 2B, SS |
| Génesis Cabrera | 2025 | RP |
| Miguel Cairo | 2005 | 2B |
| Jamie Callahan | 2017 | RP |
| Mike Cameron | 2004–2005 | OF |
| Eric Cammack | 2000 | RP |
| Eric Campbell | 2014–2016 | 1B, 3B, OF |
| Robinson Cancel | 2008–2009 | C |
| John Candelaria | 1987 | SP |
| John Cangelosi | 1994 | OF |
| Mark Canha | 2022–2023 | OF, 1B |
| Griffin Canning | 2025 | SP |
| Chris Cannizzaro | 1962–1965 | C |
| Robinson Canó | 2019–2022 | 2B |
| Buzz Capra | 1971–1973 | RP |
| Chris Capuano | 2011 | SP |
| José Cardenal | 1979–1980 | OF, 1B |
| Don Cardwell | 1967–1970 | SP |
| Buddy Carlyle | 2014–2015 | RP |
| Duke Carmel | 1963 | OF, 1B |
| Chuck Carr | 1990–1991 | OF |
| Carlos Carrasco | 2021–2023 | SP |
| D. J. Carrasco | 2011–2012 | RP |
| Mark Carreon | 1987–1991 | OF |
| Alex Carrillo | 2025 | RP |
| Robert Carson | 2012–2013 | RP |
| Chris Carter | 2010 | OF |
| **Gary Carter** | 1985–1989 | C |
| Raúl Casanova | 2008 | C |
| Alberto Castillo | 1995–1998 | C |
| José Castillo | 2025 | RP |
| Juan Castillo | 1994 | SP |
| Luis Castillo | 2007–2010 | 2B |
| Tony Castillo | 1991 | RP |
| Ramón Castro | 2005–2009 | C |
| Miguel Castro | 2020–2021 | RP |
| Frank Catalanotto | 2010 | PH |
| Gavin Cecchini | 2016–2017 | 2B |
| Darrell Ceciliani | 2015 | OF |
| Roger Cedeño | 1999, 2002–2003 | OF |
| Ronny Cedeño | 2012 | SS, 2B |
| Juan Centeno | 2013–2014 | C |
| Jaime Cerda | 2002–2003 | RP |
| Rick Cerone | 1991 | C |
| Yoenis Céspedes | 2015–2018 | OF |
| Elio Chacón | 1962 | SS |
| Dean Chance | 1970 | RP |
| Kelvin Chapman | 1979, 1984–1985 | 2B |
| Ed Charles | 1967–1969 | 3B |
| Endy Chávez | 2006–2008 | OF |
| Bruce Chen | 2001–2002 | SP |
| Rich Chiles | 1973 | OF |
| Robinson Chirinos | 2020 | C |
| Harry Chiti | 1962 | C |
| John Christensen | 1984–1985 | OF |
| McKay Christensen | 2002 | OF |
| Joe Christopher | 1962–1965 | OF |
| Ryan Church | 2008–2009 | OF |
| Galen Cisco | 1962–1965 | P |
| Brady Clark | 2002, 2008 | OF |
| Mark Clark | 1996–1997 | SP |
| Tony Clark | 2003 | 1B |
| Alex Claudio | 2022 | RP |
| Sam Clay | 2022 | RP |
| Donn Clendenon | 1969–1971 | 1B |
| Gene Clines | 1975 | OF |
| Tyler Clippard | 2015 | RP |
| Brad Clontz | 1998 | RP |
| Choo-Choo Coleman | 1962–1963, 1966 | C |
| Vince Coleman | 1991–1993 | OF |
| Willie Collazo | 2007 | RP |
| Kevin Collins | 1965, 1967–1969 | 3B |
| Bartolo Colón | 2014–2016 | SP |
| David Cone | 1987–1992, 2003 | SP |
| Michael Conforto | 2015–2021 | OF |
| Jeff Conine | 2007 | OF |
| P.J. Conlon | 2018 | SP |
| Bill Connors | 1967–1968 | RP |
| Cliff Cook | 1962–1963 | OF, 3B |
| Dennis Cook | 1998–2001 | RP |
| Sam Coonrod | 2023 | RP |
| Scott Copeland | 2018 | RP |
| Alex Cora | 2009–2010 | 2B, SS |
| Tim Corcoran | 1986 | 1B |
| Ryan Cordell | 2020 | OF |
| Mark Corey | 2001–2002 | RP |
| Mardie Cornejo | 1978 | RP |
| Reid Cornelius | 1995 | SP |
| Billy Cowan | 1965 | OF |
| Collin Cowgill | 2013 | OF |
| Roger Craig | 1962–1963 | SP |
| Jerry Cram | 1974–1975 | RP |
| Joe Crawford | 1997 | RP |
| Mike Cubbage | 1981 | 3B |
| Michael Cuddyer | 2015 | LF |
| Xzavion Curry | 2026–present | RP |
| John Curtiss | 2023 | RP |
| Jeff D'Amico | 2002 | SP |
| Vic Darensbourg | 2004 | RP |
| Ron Darling | 1983–1991 | SP |
| Travis d'Arnaud | 2013–2019 | C |
| Brian Daubach | 2005 | 1B |
| Ray Daviault | 1962 | RP |
| Ike Davis | 2010–2014 | 1B |
| J. D. Davis | 2019–2022 | 3B, OF |
| Kane Davis | 2002 | RP |
| Rajai Davis | 2019 | OF |
| Tommy Davis | 1967 | OF |
| Alejandro De Aza | 2016 | CF |
| Jacob deGrom | 2014–2022 | SP |
| Mike DeJean | 2004–2005 | RP |
| Carlos Delgado | 2006–2009 | 1B |
| Wilson Delgado | 2004 | SS |
| John DeMerit | 1962 | OF |
| Matt den Dekker | 2013–2014, 2018 | OF |
| Bill Denehy | 1967 | P |
| Joe DePastino | 2003 | C |
| Elmer Dessens | 2009–2010 | RP |
| Chris Devenski | 2025 | RP |
| Mark Dewey | 1992 | RP |
| Carlos Diaz | 1982–1983 | RP |
| Edwin Díaz | 2019–2025 | RP |
| Mario Díaz | 1990 | SS |
| Víctor Díaz | 2004–2006 | RF |
| Yennsy Díaz | 2021 | RP |
| R. A. Dickey | 2010–2012 | SP |
| Jake Diekman | 2024 | RP |
| Mike DiFelice | 2005–2007 | C |
| Jack DiLauro | 1969 | RP |
| Steve Dillon | 1963–1964 | RP |
| Jerry Dipoto | 1995–1996 | RP |
| Chris Donnels | 1991–1992 | 3B, 1B, 2B |
| Octavio Dotel | 1999 | SP |
| Brian Dozier | 2020 | 2B |
| D.J. Dozier | 1992 | OF |
| Sammy Drake | 1962 | 2B, 3B |
| Mike Draper | 1993 | RP |
| Brandon Drury | 2021 | OF, IF |
| Daniel Duarte | 2026–present | RP |
| Lucas Duda | 2010–2017 | 1B, OF |
| Jeff Duncan | 2003–2004 | CF |
| Shawon Dunston | 1999 | OF |
| Jim Dwyer | 1976 | OF |
| Duffy Dyer | 1968–1974 | C |
| Lenny Dykstra | 1985–1989 | OF |
| Damion Easley | 2007–2008 | 2B, OF |
| Tom Edens | 1987 | SP |
| Josh Edgin | 2012–2014, 2016–2017 | RP |
| Jack Egbert | 2012 | RP |
| Jerad Eickhoff | 2021 | SP |
| Dave Eilers | 1965–1966 | RP |
| Larry Elliot | 1964, 1966 | OF |
| Dock Ellis | 1979 | SP |
| Kevin Elster | 1986–1992 | SS |
| Brad Emaus | 2011 | 2B |
| Scott Erickson | 2004 | SP |
| Alex Escobar | 2001 | OF |
| Eduardo Escobar | 2022–2023 | 3B, 2B |
| Nino Espinosa | 1974–1978 | SP |
| Álvaro Espinoza | 1996 | 3B |
| Shawn Estes | 2002 | SP |
| Chuck Estrada | 1967 | RP |
| Frank Estrada | 1971 | C |
| Nick Evans | 2008–2011 | OF |
| Phillip Evans | 2017–2018 | IF |
| Dana Eveland | 2014 | RP |
| Carl Everett | 1995–1997 | OF |
| A. J. Ewing | 2026–present | OF |
| Jorge Fábregas | 1998 | C |
| Pete Falcone | 1979–1982 | P |
| Jeurys Familia | 2012–2018, 2019–2021 | RP |
| Johneshwy Fargas | 2021 | OF |
| Kyle Farnsworth | 2014 | RP |
| Jesús Feliciano | 2010 | OF |
| Pedro Feliciano | 2002–2004, 2006–2010, 2013 | RP |
| Chico Fernández | 1963 | SS |
| Sid Fernandez | 1984–1993 | SP |
| Tony Fernández | 1993 | SS |
| Sergio Ferrer | 1978–1979 | SS, 3B |
| Matt Festa | 2024 | P |
| Nelson Figueroa | 2008–2009 | P |
| Tom Filer | 1992 | RP |
| Jack Fisher | 1964–1967 | SP |
| Nate Fisher | 2022 | RP |
| Mike Fitzgerald | 1983–1984 | C |
| Shaun Fitzmaurice | 1966 | OF |
| Chris Flexen | 2017–2019 | SP |
| Don Florence | 1995 | RP |
| Gil Flores | 1978–1979 | OF |
| Wilmer Flores | 2013–2018 | IF |
| Cliff Floyd | 2003–2006 | LF |
| Doug Flynn | 1977–1981 | 2B, SS |
| Tim Foli | 1970–1971, 1978–1979 | SS, 2B, 3B |
| Rich Folkers | 1970 | RP |
| Wilmer Font | 2019 | RP |
| Brook Fordyce | 1995 | C |
| Bartolomé Fortunato | 2004, 2006 | RP |
| Larry Foss | 1962 | RP |
| Casey Fossum | 2009 | P |
| George Foster | 1982–1986 | OF |
| Leo Foster | 1976–1977 | IF |
| Joe Foy | 1970 | 3B |
| Frank Francisco | 2012–2013 | RP |
| John Franco | 1990–2001, 2003–2004 | RP |
| Julio Franco | 2006–2007 | 1B |
| Matt Franco | 1996–2000 | 3B, 1B, LF |
| Jeff Francoeur | 2009–2010 | RF |
| Todd Frazier | 2018–2019 | 3B |
| Jim Fregosi | 1972–1973 | 3B |
| Bob Friend | 1966 | P |
| Danny Frisella | 1967–1972 | RP |
| Mike Fyhrie | 1996 | RP |
| Brent Gaff | 1982–1984 | RP |
| Drew Gagnon | 2018–2019 | RP, SP |
| Bob Gallagher | 1975 | OF |
| Dave Gallagher | 1992–1993 | OF |
| Ben Gamel | 2024 | OF |
| Danny Garcia | 2003–2004 | 2B |
| Karim García | 2004 | RF |
| Rico Garcia | 2025 | RP |
| Ron Gardenhire | 1981–1985 | SS |
| Jeff Gardner | 1991 | SS, 2B |
| Rob Gardner | 1965–1966 | P |
| Wes Gardner | 1984–1985 | RP |
| Reed Garrett | 2023–present | RP |
| Wayne Garrett | 1969–1976 | 3B, 2B |
| Justin Garza | 2025 | RP |
| Rod Gaspar | 1969–1970 | OF |
| Dillon Gee | 2010–2013 | SP |
| Gary Gentry | 1969–1972 | SP |
| Joey Gerber | 2026–present | RP |
| Gonzalez Germen | 2013–2014 | RP |
| John Gibbons | 1984, 1986 | C |
| Bob Gibson | 1987 | RP |
| Paul Gibson | 1992–1993 | RP |
| Shawn Gilbert | 1997–1998 | IF |
| Brian Giles | 1981–1983 | 2B |
| Bernard Gilkey | 1996–1998 | LF |
| Sean Gilmartin | 2015–2017 | RP |
| Andrés Giménez | 2020 | SS, 2B, 3B |
| Joe Ginsberg | 1962 | C |
| Matt Ginter | 2004 | SP |
| Mychal Givens | 2022 | RP |
| Mike Glavine | 2003 | 1B |
| **Tom Glavine** | 2003–2007 | SP |
| Ed Glynn | 1979–1980 | RP |
| Erik Goeddel | 2014–2017 | RP |
| Carlos Gómez | 2007, 2019 | OF |
| Jesse Gonder | 1963–1965 | C |
| Adrián González | 2018 | 1B |
| Dicky Gonzalez | 2001 | P |
| Geremi González | 2006 | SP |
| Raúl González | 2002–2003 | OF |
| Dwight Gooden | 1984–1994 | SP |
| Greg Goossen | 1965–1968 | C, 1B |
| Terrance Gore | 2022 | OF |
| Tom Gorman | 1982–1985 | RP |
| Jim Gosger | 1969, 1973–1974 | OF |
| Rubén Gotay | 2007 | 2B |
| Trevor Gott | 2023 | RP |
| Mauro Gozzo | 1993–1994 | RP |
| Bill Graham | 1967 | P |
| Wayne Graham | 1964 | 3B |
| Curtis Granderson | 2014–2017 | OF |
| Danny Graves | 2005 | RP |
| Andy Green | 2009 | IF |
| Dallas Green | 1966 | RP |
| Pumpsie Green | 1963 | 3B |
| Sean Green | 2009–2010 | RP |
| Shawn Green | 2006–2007 | OF |
| Charlie Greene | 1996 | C |
| Kenny Greer | 1993 | RP |
| Tom Grieve | 1978 | OF |
| Jeremy Griffiths | 2003 | P |
| Jerry Grote | 1966–1977 | C |
| Joe Grzenda | 1967 | RP |
| Robert Gsellman | 2016–2021 | SP, RP |
| Lee Guetterman | 1992 | RP |
| Luis Guillorme | 2018–2024 | SS |
| Eric Gunderson | 1994–1995 | RP |
| Mark Guthrie | 2002 | RP |
| Ricky Gutiérrez | 2004 | 2B |
| Justin Hagenman | 2025–present | P |
| Sam Haggerty | 2019 | PR |
| Jake Hager | 2021 | OF |
| Don Hahn | 1971–1974 | OF |
| Scott Hairston | 2011–2012 | OF |
| Tom Hall | 1975–1976 | RP |
| Shane Halter | 1999 | OF, SS |
| Dom Hamel | 2025 | RP |
| Billy Hamilton | 2020 | CF |
| Darryl Hamilton | 1999–2001 | OF |
| Jack Hamilton | 1966–1967 | RP |
| Justin Hampson | 2012 | RP |
| Ike Hampton | 1974 | C |
| Mike Hampton | 2000 | SP |
| Tim Hamulack | 2005 | RP |
| Brad Hand | 2021 | RP |
| Todd Haney | 1998 | LF, 2B |
| Eric Hanhold | 2018 | RP |
| Aaron Harang | 2013 | SP |
| Jason Hardtke | 1996–1997 | 2B |
| Shawn Hare | 1994 | OF |
| Tim Harkness | 1963–1964 | 1B |
| Pete Harnisch | 1995–1997 | SP |
| Bud Harrelson | 1965–1977 | SS |
| Greg A. Harris | 1981 | SP |
| Lenny Harris | 1998, 2000–2001 | OF, 3B |
| Willie Harris | 2011 | OF |
| Donnie Hart | 2019 | RP |
| Geoff Hartlieb | 2021 | RP |
| Greg Harts | 1973 | PH |
| Grant Hartwig | 2023–2024 | RP |
| Matt Harvey | 2012–2018 | SP |
| Andy Hassler | 1979 | P |
| Tom Hausman | 1978–1982 | P |
| LaTroy Hawkins | 2013 | RP |
| Ed Hearn | 1986 | C |
| Richie Hebner | 1979 | 3B |
| Adeiny Hechavarría | 2019 | SS |
| Danny Heep | 1983–1986 | OF |
| Jeremy Hefner | 2012–2013 | P |
| Jack Heidemann | 1975–1976 | SS |
| Aaron Heilman | 2003–2008 | P |
| Bob Heise | 1967–1969 | 2B, SS |
| Ryan Helsley | 2025 | RP |
| Heath Hembree | 2021 | RP |
| Jim Henderson | 2016 | RP |
| Ken Henderson | 1978 | OF |
| **Rickey Henderson** | 1999–2000 | LF |
| Steve Henderson | 1977–1980 | OF |
| Bob Hendley | 1967 | SP |
| Sean Henn | 2013 | RP |
| Phil Hennigan | 1973 | RP |
| Doug Henry | 1995–1996 | RP |
| Bill Hepler | 1966 | RP |
| Ron Herbel | 1970 | RP |
| Félix Heredia | 2005 | RP |
| Guillermo Heredia | 2020 | CF |
| Kevin Herget | 2025–present | RP |
| Anderson Hernández | 2005–2007 | 2B, SS |
| Keith Hernandez | 1983–1989 | 1B |
| Liván Hernández | 2009 | SP |
| Luis Hernández | 2010 | IF |
| Manny Hernández | 1989 | RP |
| Orlando Hernández | 2006–2007 | SP |
| Roberto Hernández | 2005, 2006 | RP |
| Tom Herr | 1990–1991 | 2B |
| Daniel Herrera | 2011 | RP |
| Dilson Herrera | 2015 | 2B |
| Rick Herrscher | 1962 | IF |
| Orel Hershiser | 1999 | SP |
| Mike Hessman | 2010 | PH |
| Jim Hickman | 1962–1966 | OF |
| Joe Hicks | 1963 | OF |
| Richard Hidalgo | 2004 | RF |
| Joe Hietpas | 2004 | C |
| Trevor Hildenberger | 2021 | RP |
| Rich Hill | 2021 | SP |
| Chuck Hiller | 1965–1967 | 2B |
| Dave Hillman | 1962 | RP |
| Eric Hillman | 1992–1994 | SP |
| Brett Hinchliffe | 2001 | SP |
| Jerry Hinsley | 1964, 1967 | RP |
| **Gil Hodges** | 1962–1963 | 1B |
| Ron Hodges | 1973–1984 | C |
| Colin Holderman | 2022 | RP |
| Scott Holman | 1980, 1982–1983 | P |
| Clay Holmes | 2025–2026 | SP |
| Jay Hook | 1962–1964 | P |
| Adrian Houser | 2024 | P |
| Wayne Housie | 1993 | OF |
| Mike Howard | 1981–1983 | OF |
| Pat Howell | 1992 | OF |
| Chin-lung Hu | 2011 | 2B |
| John Hudek | 1998 | RP |
| Jesse Hudson | 1969 | RP |
| Joe Hudson | 2024 | C |
| Jared Hughes | 2020 | RP |
| Keith Hughes | 1990 | OF |
| Philip Humber | 2006–2007 | RP |
| Todd Hundley | 1990–1998 | C |
| Ron Hunt | 1963–1966 | 2B |
| Tommy Hunter | 2021–2023 | RP |
| Willard Hunter | 1962, 1964 | RP |
| Clint Hurdle | 1983, 1985, 1987 | C, OF, 3B |
| Jonathan Hurst | 1994 | RP |
| Butch Huskey | 1993, 1995–1998 | OF, 1B, 3B |
| Andy Ibáñez | 2026–present | OF |
| Ryota Igarashi | 2010–2011 | RP |
| Jose Iglesias | 2024 | 2B, 3B |
| Ender Inciarte | 2022 | OF |
| Jeff Innis | 1987–1993 | RP |
| Kazuhisa Ishii | 2005 | SP |
| Jason Isringhausen | 1995–1997, 1999, 2011 | P |
| Al Jackson | 1962–1965, 1968–1969 | SP |
| Austin Jackson | 2018 | OF |
| Darrin Jackson | 1993 | OF |
| Roy Lee Jackson | 1977–1980 | P |
| Mike Jacobs | 2005, 2010 | 1B |
| Jason Jacome | 1994–1995 | SP |
| Travis Jankowski | 2022, 2025 | LF |
| Tyler Jay | 2024 | RP |
| Gregg Jefferies | 1987–1991 | 2B, 3B |
| Stanley Jefferson | 1986 | OF |
| Chris Jelic | 1990 | OF |
| Ben Johnson | 2007 | OF |
| Bob D. Johnson | 1969 | RP |
| Bob W. Johnson | 1967 | IF |
| Howard Johnson | 1985–1993 | 3B, SS, OF |
| Kelly Johnson | 2015–2016 | IF |
| Lance Johnson | 1996–1997 | CF |
| Mark P. Johnson | 2000–2002 | 1B, OF |
| Rob Johnson | 2012 | C |
| Barry Jones | 1992 | RP |
| Bobby J. Jones | 1993–2000 | SP |
| Bobby M. Jones | 2000, 2002 | RP |
| Chris Jones | 1995–1996 | OF |
| Cleon Jones | 1963, 1965–1975 | OF |
| Randy Jones | 1981–1982 | SP |
| Ross Jones | 1984 | SS |
| Sherman Jones | 1962 | P |
| Ricardo Jordan | 1997 | RP |
| Mike Jorgensen | 1968, 1970–1971, 1980–1983 | 1B, OF |
| Jorge Julio | 2006 | RP |
| Ariel Jurado | 2020 | SP |
| Kevin Kaczmarski | 2018 | OF |
| Jeff Kaiser | 1993 | RP |
| Rod Kanehl | 1962–1964 | 2B, OF, 3B |
| Takashi Kashiwada | 1997 | RP |
| Anthony Kay | 2023 | RP |
| Ty Kelly | 2016–2017, 2018 | IF, OF |
| **Jeff Kent** | 1992–1996 | 2B, 3B |
| Jeff Keppinger | 2004 | 2B |
| Franklyn Kilome | 2020 | P |
| Dave Kingman | 1975–1977, 1981–1983 | 1B, OF |
| Mike Kinkade | 1998–2000 | OF |
| Wayne Kirby | 1998 | OF |
| Bobby Klaus | 1964–1965 | IF |
| Jay Kleven | 1976 | C |
| Lou Klimchock | 1966 | PH |
| Brandon Knight | 2008 | SP |
| Ray Knight | 1984–1986 | 3B |
| Kevin Kobel | 1978–1980 | P |
| Adam Kolarek | 2023 | RP |
| Gary Kolb | 1965 | OF |
| Satoru Komiyama | 2002 | RP |
| Dae-Sung Koo | 2005 | RP |
| Cal Koonce | 1967–1970 | RP |
| Jerry Koosman | 1967–1978 | SP |
| Ed Kranepool | 1962–1979 | 1B, OF |
| Max Kranick | 2025 | RP |
| Gary Kroll | 1964–1965 | P |
| Eddie Kunz | 2008 | RP |
| Clem Labine | 1962 | RP |
| Aaron Laffey | 2013 | SP |
| Juan Lagares | 2013–2019 | OF |
| Jack Lamabe | 1967 | RP |
| David Lamb | 2000 | IF |
| Hobie Landrith | 1962 | C |
| Ced Landrum | 1993 | OF |
| John Lannan | 2014 | RP |
| Frank Lary | 1964–1965 | P |
| Bill Latham | 1985 | P |
| Brian Lawrence | 2007 | SP |
| Matt Lawton | 2001 | RF |
| Terry Leach | 1981–1982, 1985–1989 | RP |
| Tim Leary | 1981, 1983–1984 | P |
| Jack Leathersich | 2015 | RP |
| Ricky Ledée | 2006–2007 | OF |
| Aaron Ledesma | 1995 | 3B |
| Khalil Lee | 2021–2022 | OF |
| Al Leiter | 1998–2004 | SP |
| Dominic Leone | 2023 | RP |
| Fred Lewis | 2012 | RF |
| Johnny Lewis | 1965–1967 | OF |
| Dave Liddell | 1990 | C |
| Cory Lidle | 1997 | RP |
| José Lima | 2006 | SP |
| Jim Lindeman | 1994 | OF |
| Francisco Lindor | 2021–present | SS |
| Doug Linton | 1994 | RP |
| Phil Linz | 1967–1968 | 2B |
| Mark Little | 2002 | RF |
| Graeme Lloyd | 2003 | RP |
| Paul Lo Duca | 2006–2007 | C |
| José Lobaton | 2018 | C |
| Tim Locastro | 2023 | LF |
| Ron Locke | 1964 | RP |
| Walker Lockett | 2019–2020 | SP, RP |
| Skip Lockwood | 1975–1979 | RP |
| Mickey Lolich | 1976 | SP |
| Phil Lombardi | 1989 | C |
| Kevin Lomon | 1995 | RP |
| James Loney | 2016 | 1B |
| Terrence Long | 1999 | PH |
| Braden Looper | 2004–2005 | RP |
| Jorge López | 2024 | RP |
| Luis M. Lopez | 1997–1999 | SS, 2B, 3B |
| Yoan Lopez | 2022 | RP |
| Aaron Loup | 2021 | P |
| Richard Lovelady | 2025–present | RP |
| Jed Lowrie | 2019–2020 | PH |
| Joey Lucchesi | 2021 | SP |
| Seth Lugo | 2016–2022 | SP, RP |
| Al Luplow | 1966–1967 | OF |
| Zach Lutz | 2012–2013 | 1B, 3B |
| Ed Lynch | 1980–1986 | SP |
| Brandon Lyon | 2013 | RP |
| Barry Lyons | 1986–1990 | C |
| Bob MacDonald | 1996 | RP |
| Julio Machado | 1989–1990 | RP |
| Ken MacKenzie | 1962–1963 | RP |
| Elliott Maddox | 1978–1980 | 3B, OF |
| Mike Maddux | 1993–1994 | RP |
| Dave Magadan | 1986–1992 | 1B, 3B |
| Pat Mahomes | 1999–2000 | RP |
| John Maine | 2006–2010 | SP |
| Sean Manaea | 2024–present | SP |
| Pepe Mangual | 1976–1977 | OF |
| Phil Mankowski | 1980, 1982 | 3B |
| Jim Mann | 2000 | RP |
| Félix Mantilla | 1962 | 3B, SS |
| Barry Manuel | 1997 | RP |
| Josías Manzanillo | 1993–1995, 1999 | RP |
| Shaun Marcum | 2013 | SP |
| Jake Marisnick | 2020 | CF |
| Deven Marrero | 2022 | 3B |
| Eli Marrero | 2006 | OF |
| Dave Marshall | 1970–1972 | OF |
| Jim Marshall | 1962 | 1B |
| Mike A. Marshall | 1990 | 1B |
| Mike G. Marshall | 1981 | RP |
| Starling Marte | 2022–2025 | CF, RF |
| J. C. Martin | 1968–1969 | C, 1B |
| Jerry Martin | 1984 | OF |
| Tom Martin | 2001 | RP |
| Fernando Martínez | 2009–2011 | OF |
| J. D. Martinez | 2024 | CF, DH |
| Pedro A. Martínez | 1996 | RP |
| **Pedro Martínez** | 2005–2008 | SP |
| Ramon Martinez | 2008–2009 | IF |
| Ted Martínez | 1970–1974 | SS, 2B, OF |
| Roger Mason | 1994 | RP |
| Jon Matlack | 1971–1977 | SP |
| Phil Maton | 2024 | RP |
| Kazuo Matsui | 2004–2006 | SS, 2B |
| Daisuke Matsuzaka | 2013–2014 | SP |
| Gary Matthews Jr. | 2002, 2010 | OF |
| Mike Matthews | 2005 | RP |
| Steven Matz | 2015–2020 | SP |
| Ronny Mauricio | 2023–present | SS |
| Jerry May | 1973 | C |
| Trevor May | 2021–2022 | RP |
| John Mayberry Jr. | 2015 | OF |
| Cameron Maybin | 2021 | OF |
| Brent Mayne | 1996 | C |
| **Willie Mays** | 1972–1973 | OF, 1B |
| Patrick Mazeika | 2021–2022 | C |
| Chris Mazza | 2019 | RP |
| Lee Mazzilli | 1976–1981, 1986–1989 | OF, 1B |
| Jim McAndrew | 1968–1973 | P |
| James McCann | 2021–2022 | C |
| Bob McClure | 1988 | RP |
| Rodney McCray | 1992 | OF |
| Terry McDaniel | 1991 | OF |
| Roger McDowell | 1985–1989 | RP |
| Chuck McElroy | 1999 | RP |
| Joe McEwing | 2000–2004 | OF, IF |
| T. J. McFarland | 2023 | RP |
| Kevin McGowan | 2017 | RP |
| Tug McGraw | 1965–1967, 1969–1974 | RP |
| Ryan McGuire | 2000 | RF |
| Collin McHugh | 2012–2013 | P |
| Billy McKinney | 2021 | OF |
| Jeff McKnight | 1989, 1992–1994 | IF |
| Nolan McLean | 2025–present | SP |
| Greg McMichael | 1997–1999 | RP |
| Roy McMillan | 1964–1966 | SS |
| Jeff McNeil | 2018–2025 | 2B, OF |
| Brian McRae | 1997–1999 | CF |
| Kevin McReynolds | 1987–1991, 1994 | OF |
| Doc Medich | 1977 | SP |
| Adonis Medina | 2022 | RP |
| Tylor Megill | 2021–present | P |
| Jenrry Mejía | 2010, 2012–2015 | RP |
| MJ Melendez | 2026–present | LF, DH |
| Danny Mendick | 2023 | 2B, 3B, OF |
| Carlos Mendoza | 1997 | OF |
| Orlando Mercado | 1990 | C |
| Devin Mesoraco | 2018 | C |
| Butch Metzger | 1978 | RP |
| Jason Middlebrook | 2002–2003 | P |
| Doug Mientkiewicz | 2005 | 1B |
| Félix Millán | 1973–1977 | 2B |
| Lastings Milledge | 2006–2007 | OF |
| Bob G. Miller | 1962 | RP |
| Bob L. Miller | 1962, 1973–1974 | P |
| Dyar Miller | 1980–1981 | RP |
| Keith Miller | 1987–1991 | 2B, OF |
| Larry Miller | 1965–1966 | RP |
| Tyson Miller | 2023 | RP |
| Ralph Milliard | 1998 | 2B |
| Randy Milligan | 1987 | PH |
| John Milner | 1971–1977 | 1B, OF |
| Tommy Milone | 2010 | RP |
| Blas Minor | 1995–1996 | RP |
| A. J. Minter | 2025–2026 | RP |
| Pat Misch | 2009–2011 | P |
| John Mitchell | 1986–1989 | SP |
| Kevin Mitchell | 1984, 1986 | OF, SS, 3B |
| Vinegar Bend Mizell | 1962 | RP |
| Dave Mlicki | 1995–1998 | P |
| Herb Moford | 1962 | RP |
| Gustavo Molina | 2008 | C |
| Johnny Monell | 2015 | C |
| Willie Montañez | 1978–1979 | 1B |
| Frankie Montas | 2025 | SP |
| Rafael Montero | 2014–2017 | RP |
| Bryce Montes de Oca | 2022 | RP |
| Joe Moock | 1967 | 3B |
| Tommy Moore | 1972–1973 | P |
| Bob Moorhead | 1962, 1965 | RP |
| Melvin Mora | 1999–2000 | OF, SS |
| Nick Morabito | 2026–present | OF |
| Jerry Morales | 1980 | OF |
| Al Moran | 1963–1964 | SS |
| José Moreno | 1980 | 3B, 2B |
| Orber Moreno | 2003–2004 | RP |
| Kevin Morgan | 1997 | 3B |
| Akeel Morris | 2015 | RP |
| Guillermo Mota | 2006–2007 | RP |
| Zach Muckenhirn | 2023 | RP |
| Cedric Mullins | 2025 | CF |
| Carlos Muñiz | 2007–2008 | RP |
| Danny Muno | 2015 | 2B, 3B |
| Billy Murphy | 1966 | OF |
| Daniel Murphy | 2008–2009, 2011–2015 | 1B, 2B, 3B, OF |
| Dale Murray | 1978–1979 | RP |
| Dan Murray | 1999 | RP |
| **Eddie Murray** | 1992–1993 | 1B |
| Dennis Musgraves | 1965 | RP |
| Jeff Musselman | 1989–1990 | RP |
| Randy Myers | 1985–1989 | RP |
| Tobias Myers | 2026–present | RP |
| Bob Myrick | 1976–1978 | RP |
| Xavier Nady | 2006 | RF |
| Danny Napoleon | 1965–1966 | OF, 3B |
| Tyler Naquin | 2022 | LF, RF |
| Omar Narváez | 2023–2024 | C |
| Tito Navarro | 1993 | SS |
| Charlie Neal | 1962–1963 | 2B, 3B, SS |
| David Newhan | 2007 | OF |
| Mike Nickeas | 2010–2012 | C |
| Tomás Nido | 2017–2024 | C |
| Randy Niemann | 1985–1986 | RP |
| Jon Niese | 2008–2015, 2016 | SP |
| Kirk Nieuwenhuis | 2012–2015 | OF |
| Fernando Nieve | 2009–2010 | SP |
| Brandon Nimmo | 2016–2025 | OF |
| C.J. Nitkowski | 2001 | RP |
| Vinny Nittoli | 2023 | RP |
| Trot Nixon | 2008 | OF |
| Junior Noboa | 1992 | 2B |
| Stephen Nogosek | 2019, 2021–2023 | RP |
| Joe Nolan | 1972 | C |
| Hideo Nomo | 1998 | SP |
| Dan Norman | 1977–1980 | OF |
| Abraham Núñez | 2008 | IF |
| Dedniel Núñez | 2024–present | RP |
| Eduardo Núñez | 2020 | RF, DH |
| Edwin Núñez | 1988 | RP |
| Jon Nunnally | 2000 | OF |
| Charlie O'Brien | 1990–1993 | C |
| Alex Ochoa | 1995–1997 | RF |
| Michael O'Connor | 2011 | RP |
| Darren O'Day | 2009 | RP |
| José Offerman | 2005 | 1B |
| Eric O'Flaherty | 2015 | RP |
| Bob Ojeda | 1986–1990 | SP |
| John Olerud | 1997–1999 | 1B |
| Darren Oliver | 2006 | RP |
| Garrett Olson | 2012 | RP |
| Tom O'Malley | 1989–1990 | 3B |
| José Oquendo | 1983–1984 | SS |
| Rey Ordóñez | 1996–2002 | SS |
| Jesse Orosco | 1979, 1981–1987 | RP |
| Ryan O'Rourke | 2019 | RP |
| Joe Orsulak | 1993–1995 | OF |
| Rafael Ortega | 2023 | CF |
| Junior Ortiz | 1983–1984 | C |
| Eric Orze | 2024 | P |
| Brian Ostrosser | 1973 | SS |
| Corey Oswalt | 2018–2021 | SP, RP |
| Ricky Otero | 1995 | OF |
| Amos Otis | 1967, 1969 | OF |
| Adam Ottavino | 2022–2024 | RP |
| Henry Owens | 2006 | RP |
| Rick Ownbey | 1982–1983 | P |
| John Pacella | 1977, 1979–1980 | P |
| Tom Paciorek | 1985 | OF |
| Juan Padilla | 2005 | RP |
| Ángel Pagán | 2008–2011 | OF |
| Joe Panik | 2019 | 2B |
| Craig Paquette | 1998 | 3B |
| Chan Ho Park | 2007 | SP |
| Harry Parker | 1973–1975 | P |
| Rick Parker | 1994 | OF |
| Bobby Parnell | 2008–2015 | RP |
| José Parra | 2004 | RP |
| Tom Parsons | 1964–1965 | P |
| Valentino Pascucci | 2011 | 1B |
| Ronny Paulino | 2011 | C |
| Jay Payton | 1998–2002 | CF |
| Bill Pecota | 1992 | IF |
| Al Pedrique | 1987 | SS |
| Mike Pelfrey | 2006–2012 | SP |
| Brock Pemberton | 1974–1975 | 1B |
| Alejandro Peña | 1990–1991 | RP |
| Freddy Peralta | 2026 | SP |
| José Peraza | 2021 | 2B |
| Cionel Pérez | 2026–present | RP |
| Michael Pérez | 2022–2023 | C |
| Óliver Pérez | 2006–2010 | SP |
| Timo Pérez | 2000–2003 | OF |
| Yorkis Pérez | 1997 | RP |
| Robert Person | 1995–1996 | P |
| Roberto Petagine | 1996–1997 | 1B |
| David Peterson | 2020–2026 | SP |
| Tim Peterson | 2018–2019 | RP |
| Bobby Pfeil | 1969 | 3B, 2B |
| Tommy Pham | 2023 | DH |
| Andy Phillips | 2008 | LF, 1B |
| Jason Phillips | 2001–2004 | C, 1B |
| Mike Phillips | 1975–1977 | SS |
| Tony Phillips | 1998 | OF |
| **Mike Piazza** | 1998–2005 | C |
| Jimmy Piersall | 1963 | OF |
| Joe Pignatano | 1962 | C |
| Tyler Pill | 2017 | SP |
| Kevin Pillar | 2021 | OF |
| Jonathan Pintaro | 2025–present | P |
| Kevin Plawecki | 2015–2018 | C |
| Nick Plummer | 2022 | LF, RF |
| Colin Poche | 2025 | RP |
| Jorge Polanco | 2026–present | 1B |
| Zach Pop | 2025 | RP |
| Rick Porcello | 2020 | SP |
| Brooks Pounders | 2019 | RP |
| Grover Powell | 1963 | RP |
| Todd Pratt | 1997–2001 | C |
| Jason Pridie | 2011 | OF |
| Rich Puig | 1974 | 2B |
| Charlie Puleo | 1981–1982 | P |
| Bill Pulsipher | 1995, 1998, 2000 | P |
| J.J. Putz | 2009 | P |
| José Quintana | 2023–2024 | SP |
| Omar Quintanilla | 2012, 2013–2014 | SS |
| Gary Rajsich | 1982–1983 | OF, 1B |
| Brooks Raley | 2023–2026 | RP |
| Elvin Ramírez | 2012 | RP |
| Erasmo Ramírez | 2020 | RP |
| Mario Ramírez | 1980 | IF |
| Neil Ramírez | 2017 | RP |
| Ramón Ramírez | 2012 | RP |
| Yohan Ramírez | 2024 | RP |
| A.J. Ramos | 2017–2018 | RP |
| Wilson Ramos | 2019–2020 | C |
| Len Randle | 1977–1978 | 3B |
| Willie Randolph | 1992 | 2B |
| Bob Rauch | 1972 | RP |
| Jon Rauch | 2012 | RP |
| Jeff Reardon | 1979–1981 | RP |
| Anthony Recker | 2013–2015 | C |
| Tim Redding | 2009 | P |
| Prentice Redman | 2003 | OF |
| Addison Reed | 2015–2017 | P |
| Darren Reed | 1990 | OF |
| Jake Reed | 2021–2022 | RP |
| Jeremy Reed | 2009 | OF |
| Rick Reed | 1997–2001 | SP |
| Steve Reed | 2002 | RP |
| Sean Reid-Foley | 2021–2022 | RP |
| Jack Reinheimer | 2018 | IF |
| Desi Relaford | 2001 | 2B, SS, 3B |
| Mike Remlinger | 1994–1995 | P |
| Hal Reniff | 1967 | RP |
| Argenis Reyes | 2008–2009 | 2B |
| Denyi Reyes | 2023 | RP |
| José Reyes | 2003–2011, 2016–2018 | SS, 3B, OF |
| Pablo Reyes | 2024 | DH |
| Matt Reynolds | 2016–2017, 2022 | 2B, SS, 3B, OF |
| Ronn Reynolds | 1982–1983, 1985 | C |
| Tommie Reynolds | 1967 | OF |
| Armando Reynoso | 1997–1998 | SP |
| Jacob Rhame | 2017–2019 | RP |
| Dennis Ribant | 1964–1966 | P |
| Scott Rice | 2013–2014 | RP |
| Gordie Richardson | 1965–1966 | RP |
| Jerrod Riggan | 2000–2001 | RP |
| Ricardo Rincón | 2008 | RP |
| Royce Ring | 2005–2006 | RP |
| Luis Rivera | 1994 | SS, 2B |
| René Rivera | 2016–2017, 2019 | C, 1B |
| T.J. Rivera | 2016–2017 | 1B, 2B, 3B, OF |
| Jason Roach | 2003 | SP |
| Kevin Roberson | 1996 | RF |
| Luis Robert Jr. | 2026–present | OF |
| Dave A. Roberts | 1981 | P |
| Grant Roberts | 2000–2004 | RP |
| David Robertson | 2023 | RP |
| Hansel Robles | 2015–2018 | RP |
| Francisco Rodríguez | 2009–2011 | RP |
| Joely Rodríguez | 2022 | RP |
| Rich Rodriguez | 2000 | RP |
| Kenny Rogers | 1999 | SP |
| Tyler Rogers | 2025 | RP |
| Les Rohr | 1967–1969 | P |
| Mel Rojas | 1997–1998 | RP |
| Luis Rosado | 1977, 1980 | 1B |
| Amed Rosario | 2017–2020 | SS |
| Brian Rose | 2001 | RP |
| Don Rose | 1971 | RP |
| Vinny Rottino | 2012 | 1B, OF |
| Don Rowe | 1963 | RP |
| Darin Ruf | 2022 | OF, 1B |
| Justin Ruggiano | 2016 | OF |
| Glendon Rusch | 1999–2001 | SP |
| Dick Rusteck | 1966 | P |
| **Nolan Ryan** | 1966, 1968–1971 | P |
| Bret Saberhagen | 1992–1995 | SP |
| Ray Sadecki | 1970–1974, 1977 | P |
| Fernando Salas | 2016–2017 | RP |
| Joe Sambito | 1985 | RP |
| Amado Samuel | 1964 | SS, 3B |
| Juan Samuel | 1989 | OF |
| Ali Sánchez | 2020 | C |
| Duaner Sánchez | 2006, 2008 | RP |
| Gary Sánchez | 2023 | C |
| Rey Sánchez | 2003 | SS |
| Yolmer Sánchez | 2022 | 3B |
| Ken Sanders | 1975–1976 | RP |
| Dennis Santana | 2023 | RP |
| Johan Santana | 2008–2010, 2012 | SP |
| Rafael Santana | 1984–1987 | SS |
| Héctor Santiago | 2019 | RP |
| José Santiago | 2005 | RP |
| Omir Santos | 2009 | C |
| Mackey Sasser | 1988–1992 | C |
| Josh Satin | 2011–2014 | 1B |
| Doug Saunders | 1993 | 2B |
| Rich Sauveur | 1991 | RP |
| Mac Scarce | 1975 | RP |
| Jimmie Schaffer | 1965 | C |
| Dan Schatzeder | 1990 | RP |
| Max Scherzer | 2022–2023 | SP |
| Calvin Schiraldi | 1984–1985 | P |
| Al Schmelz | 1967 | RP |
| Dave Schneck | 1972–1974 | OF |
| Brian Schneider | 2008–2009 | C |
| Scott Schoeneweis | 2007–2008 | RP |
| Dick Schofield | 1992 | SS |
| Pete Schourek | 1991–1993 | P |
| Ted Schreiber | 1963 | 3B, SS |
| Don Schulze | 1987 | SP |
| Chris Schwinden | 2011–2012 | SP |
| Christian Scott | 2024 | P |
| Mike Scott | 1979–1982 | P |
| Marco Scutaro | 2002–2003 | 2B |
| Ray Searage | 1981 | RP |
| **Tom Seaver** | 1967–1977, 1983 | SP |
| Matt Seelinger | 2026–present | RP |
| David Segui | 1994–1995 | 1B, OF |
| Aaron Sele | 2007 | RP |
| Dick Selma | 1965–1968 | P |
| Marcus Semien | 2026–present | 2B |
| Frank Seminara | 1994 | RP |
| Kodai Senga | 2023–present | SP |
| Hayden Senger | 2025–present | C |
| Jae Weong Seo | 2002–2005 | SP |
| Luis Severino | 2024 | SP |
| Paul Sewald | 2017–2020 | RP |
| Art Shamsky | 1968–1971 | OF, 1B |
| Bob Shaw | 1966–1967 | P |
| Don Shaw | 1967–1968 | RP |
| Gary Sheffield | 2009 | OF |
| Norm Sherry | 1963 | C |
| Tsuyoshi Shinjo | 2001, 2003 | OF |
| Craig Shipley | 1989 | SS, 3B |
| Bart Shirley | 1967 | 2B |
| Kelly Shoppach | 2012 | C |
| Bill Short | 1968 | RP |
| Zack Short | 2024, 2026–present | IF |
| Chasen Shreve | 2022 | RP |
| Paul Siebert | 1977–1978 | SP |
| Doug Simons | 1991 | RP |
| Ken Singleton | 1970–1971 | OF |
| Jose Siri | 2025 | CF |
| Chance Sisco | 2021 | C |
| Doug Sisk | 1982–1987 | RP |
| Bobby Smith | 1962 | OF |
| Charley Smith | 1964–1965 | 3B, SS |
| Dick A. Smith | 1963–1964 | OF, 1B |
| Dominic Smith | 2017–2022 | 1B |
| Drew Smith | 2018, 2020–2024 | RP |
| Joe Smith | 2007–2008 | RP |
| Pete Smith | 1994 | SP |
| Josh Smoker | 2016–2017 | RP |
| Esix Snead | 2002, 2004 | OF |
| **Duke Snider** | 1963 | OF |
| Alay Soler | 2006 | SP |
| Jorge Sosa | 2007–2008 | SP |
| Gregory Soto | 2025 | RP |
| Juan Soto | 2025–present | RF |
| **Warren Spahn** | 1965 | SP |
| Tim Spehr | 1998 | C |
| Shane Spencer | 2004 | OF |
| Bill Spiers | 1995 | 3B, 2B |
| Dennis Springer | 2000 | SP |
| Steve Springer | 1992 | 2B, 3B |
| Brandon Sproat | 2025 | SP |
| Larry Stahl | 1967–1968 | OF |
| Roy Staiger | 1975–1977 | 3B |
| Tracy Stallard | 1963–1964 | SP |
| Ryne Stanek | 2024–2025 | RP |
| Leroy Stanton | 1970–1971 | OF |
| Mike Stanton | 2003–2004 | RP |
| Rusty Staub | 1972–1975, 1981–1985 | OF, 1B |
| Tim Stauffer | 2015 | RP |
| John Stearns | 1975–1984 | C |
| John Stephenson | 1964–1966 | C |
| Randy Sterling | 1974 | P |
| DJ Stewart | 2023–2024 | OF |
| Kelly Stinnett | 1994–1995, 2006 | C |
| Josh Stinson | 2011 | RP |
| Robert Stock | 2021, 2026–present | SP |
| Brian Stokes | 2008–2009 | SP |
| George Stone | 1973–1975 | SP |
| Tobi Stoner | 2009–2010 | RP |
| Pat Strange | 2002–2003 | RP |
| Darryl Strawberry | 1983–1990 | OF |
| Hunter Strickland | 2020 | RP |
| Scott Strickland | 2002–2003 | RP |
| John Strohmayer | 1973–1974 | RP |
| Brent Strom | 1972 | P |
| Marcus Stroman | 2019–2021 | SP |
| Dick Stuart | 1966 | 1B |
| Tom Sturdivant | 1964 | RP |
| Bill Sudakis | 1972 | 1B, C |
| Cory Sullivan | 2009 | OF |
| John Sullivan | 1967 | C |
| Cole Sulser | 2024 | RP |
| Darrell Sutherland | 1964–1966 | RP |
| Craig Swan | 1973–1984 | SP |
| Anthony Swarzak | 2018 | RP |
| Rick Sweet | 1982 | PH |
| Jon Switzer | 2009 | RP |
| Ron Swoboda | 1965–1970 | OF |
| Noah Syndergaard | 2015–2021 | SP |
| Thomas Szapucki | 2021–2022 | RP |
| Pat Tabler | 1990 | OF |
| Travis Taijeron | 2017 | OF |
| Hisanori Takahashi | 2010 | RP |
| Ken Takahashi | 2009 | P |
| Shingo Takatsu | 2005 | RP |
| Jeff Tam | 1998–1999 | RP |
| Frank Tanana | 1993 | SP |
| Kevin Tapani | 1989 | RP |
| Tony Tarasco | 2002 | OF, 1B |
| Stephen Tarpley | 2021 | RP |
| Randy Tate | 1975 | SP |
| Fernando Tatís | 2008–2010 | OF |
| Jim Tatum | 1998 | 1B |
| Frank Taveras | 1979–1981 | SS |
| Billy Taylor | 1999 | RP |
| Chuck Taylor | 1972 | RP |
| Hawk Taylor | 1964–1967 | C |
| Ron Taylor | 1967–1971 | RP |
| Sammy Taylor | 1962–1963 | C |
| Tyrone Taylor | 2024–2026 | OF |
| Taylor Teagarden | 2014 | C |
| Julio Teherán | 2024 | SP |
| Rubén Tejada | 2010–2015, 2019 | 2B, SS |
| Dave Telgheder | 1993–1995 | P |
| Garry Templeton | 1991 | SS, 1B |
| Walt Terrell | 1982–1984 | SP |
| Ralph Terry | 1966–1967 | RP |
| Tim Teufel | 1986–1991 | 2B, 1B |
| Dale Thayer | 2011 | RP |
| George Theodore | 1973–1974 | OF, 1B |
| Josh Thole | 2009–2012 | C |
| Frank Thomas | 1962–1964 | OF, 1B |
| Ryan Thompson | 1992–1995 | OF |
| John Thomson | 2002 | SP |
| Lou Thornton | 1989–1990 | OF |
| Zac Thornton | 2026–present | SP |
| Marv Throneberry | 1962–1963 | 1B |
| Gary Thurman | 1997 | OF |
| Dick Tidrow | 1984 | RP |
| Blade Tidwell | 2025 | SP |
| Rusty Tillman | 1982 | OF |
| Jorge Toca | 1999–2001 | 1B, LF |
| Jackson Todd | 1977 | P |
| Andy Tomberlin | 1996–1997 | OF |
| Jonah Tong | 2025–present | SP |
| Michael Tonkin | 2024 | RP |
| **Joe Torre** | 1975–1977 | 1B, 3B |
| Luis Torrens | 2024–present | C |
| Alex Torres | 2015 | RP |
| Andrés Torres | 2012 | OF |
| Carlos Torres | 2013–2015 | RP |
| Mike Torrez | 1983–1984 | SP |
| Kelvin Torve | 1990–1991 | 1B |
| Wilfredo Tovar | 2013–2014, 2021 | SS |
| Steve Trachsel | 2001–2006 | SP |
| Bubba Trammell | 2000 | OF |
| Alex Treviño | 1978–1981 | C, 3B |
| Ricky Trlicek | 1996–1997 | RP |
| Nick Tropeano | 2021 | RP |
| Michael Tucker | 2006 | OF |
| Justin Turner | 2010–2013 | IF |
| Wayne Twitchell | 1979 | RP |
| Jason Tyner | 2000 | OF |
| Edwin Uceta | 2023 | RP |
| Del Unser | 1975–1976 | OF |
| Lino Urdaneta | 2007 | RP |
| José Ureña | 2025 | RP |
| Juan Uribe | 2015 | 3B |
| Mike Vail | 1975–1977 | OF |
| Raúl Valdés | 2010 | RP |
| Jordany Valdespin | 2012–2013 | PH, OF, 2B |
| Wilson Valdez | 2009 | SS |
| Eric Valent | 2004–2005 | OF, 1B |
| John Valentin | 2002 | IF |
| José Valentín | 2006–2007 | 2B |
| Bobby Valentine | 1977–1978 | IF |
| Ellis Valentine | 1981–1982 | OF |
| Julio Valera | 1990–1991 | P |
| José Valverde | 2014 | RP |
| Claudio Vargas | 2008 | SP |
| Jason Vargas | 2007, 2018–2019 | SP |
| Mo Vaughn | 2002–2003 | 1B |
| Jorge Velandia | 2000–2001, 2003 | SS, 2B |
| Robin Ventura | 1999–2001 | 3B |
| Justin Verlander | 2023 | SP |
| Logan Verrett | 2015–2016 | SP |
| Tom Veryzer | 1982 | 2B, SS |
| Mark Vientos | 2022–present | 3B |
| Jonathan Villar | 2021 | 3B |
| Fernando Viña | 1994 | IF |
| Frank Viola | 1989–1991 | SP |
| Joe Vitko | 1992 | P |
| José Vizcaíno | 1994–1996 | SS, 2B |
| Daniel Vogelbach | 2022–2023 | DH |
| Michael Wacha | 2020 | SP |
| Brandon Waddell | 2025–present | RP |
| Eric Wagaman | 2026–present | 1B, 3B, DH, OF |
| **Billy Wagner** | 2006–2009 | RP |
| Bobby Wahl | 2018 | RP |
| Bill Wakefield | 1964 | RP |
| Chico Walker | 1992–1993 | 3B, 2B, OF |
| Josh Walker | 2023–2024 | RP |
| Neil Walker | 2016–2017 | 2B |
| Pete Walker | 1995, 2001–2002 | RP |
| Taijuan Walker | 2021–2022 | SP |
| Tyler Walker | 2002 | RP |
| Donne Wall | 2001 | RP |
| Derek Wallace | 1996 | RP |
| Gene Walter | 1987–1988 | RP |
| Austin Warren | 2025–present | RP |
| Claudell Washington | 1980 | OF |
| Allen Watson | 1999 | P |
| Matt Watson | 2003 | LF |
| David Weathers | 2002–2004 | RP |
| Luke Weaver | 2026 | RP |
| Hank Webb | 1972–1976 | P |
| Al Weis | 1968–1971 | SS, 2B |
| Turk Wendell | 1997–2001 | RP |
| Joey Wendle | 2024 | 2B, 3B, SS |
| David West | 1988–1989 | P |
| Mickey Weston | 1993 | RP |
| Dan Wheeler | 2003–2004 | RP |
| Zack Wheeler | 2013–2014, 2017–2019 | SP |
| Rick White | 2000–2001 | RP |
| Wally Whitehurst | 1989–1992 | P |
| Ty Wigginton | 2002–2004 | 3B |
| Adam Wilk | 2017 | SP |
| Rick Wilkins | 1998 | C |
| Carl Willey | 1963–1965 | P |
| Nick Willhite | 1967 | P |
| Charlie Williams | 1971 | P |
| David Williams | 2006–2007 | SP |
| Devin Williams | 2026–present | RP |
| Gerald Williams | 2004–2005 | OF |
| Mason Williams | 2021 | OF |
| Trevor Williams | 2021–2022 | P |
| Justin Wilson | 2019–2020 | RP |
| Mookie Wilson | 1980–1989 | OF |
| Paul Wilson | 1996 | SP |
| Preston Wilson | 1998 | OF |
| Tom Wilson | 2004 | C |
| Vance Wilson | 1999–2004 | C |
| Jesse Winker | 2024–2025 | OF |
| Herm Winningham | 1984 | OF |
| Matt Wise | 2008 | RP |
| Gene Woodling | 1962 | OF |
| Chris Woodward | 2005–2006 | 1B, OF |
| David Wright | 2004–2016, 2018 | 3B |
| Billy Wynne | 1967 | RP |
| Jimmy Yacabonis | 2023 | RP |
| Jordan Yamamoto | 2021 | SP |
| Jefry Yan | 2026–present | RP |
| Tyler Yates | 2004 | P |
| Gabriel Ynoa | 2016 | RP |
| Masato Yoshii | 1998–1999 | SP |
| Alex Young | 2024 | RP |
| Anthony Young | 1991–1993 | P |
| Chris Young | 2011–2012 | SP |
| Chris Young | 2014 | OF |
| Danny Young | 2024–2025 | RP |
| Eric Young Jr. | 2013–2014, 2015 | OF |
| Jared Young | 2025–present | DH |
| Joel Youngblood | 1977–1982 | OF, 2B |
| Pat Zachry | 1977–1982 | SP |
| Víctor Zambrano | 2004–2006 | SP |
| Daniel Zamora | 2018–2019 | RP |
| Rob Zastryzny | 2022 | RP |
| Todd Zeile | 2000–2001, 2004 | 1B |
| Don Zimmer | 1962 | 3B |
| Tyler Zuber | 2025 | RP |
| Guillo Zuñiga | 2026–present | RP |
