= 1962 New York Mets season =

1962 New York Mets
- League: National League
- Ballpark: Polo Grounds
- City: New York
- Record: 40–120 (.250)
- League place: 10th
- Owner: Joan Payson
- General manager: George Weiss
- Manager: Casey Stengel
- Television: WOR-TV
- Radio: WABC (AM) (Ralph Kiner, Lindsey Nelson, Bob Murphy)

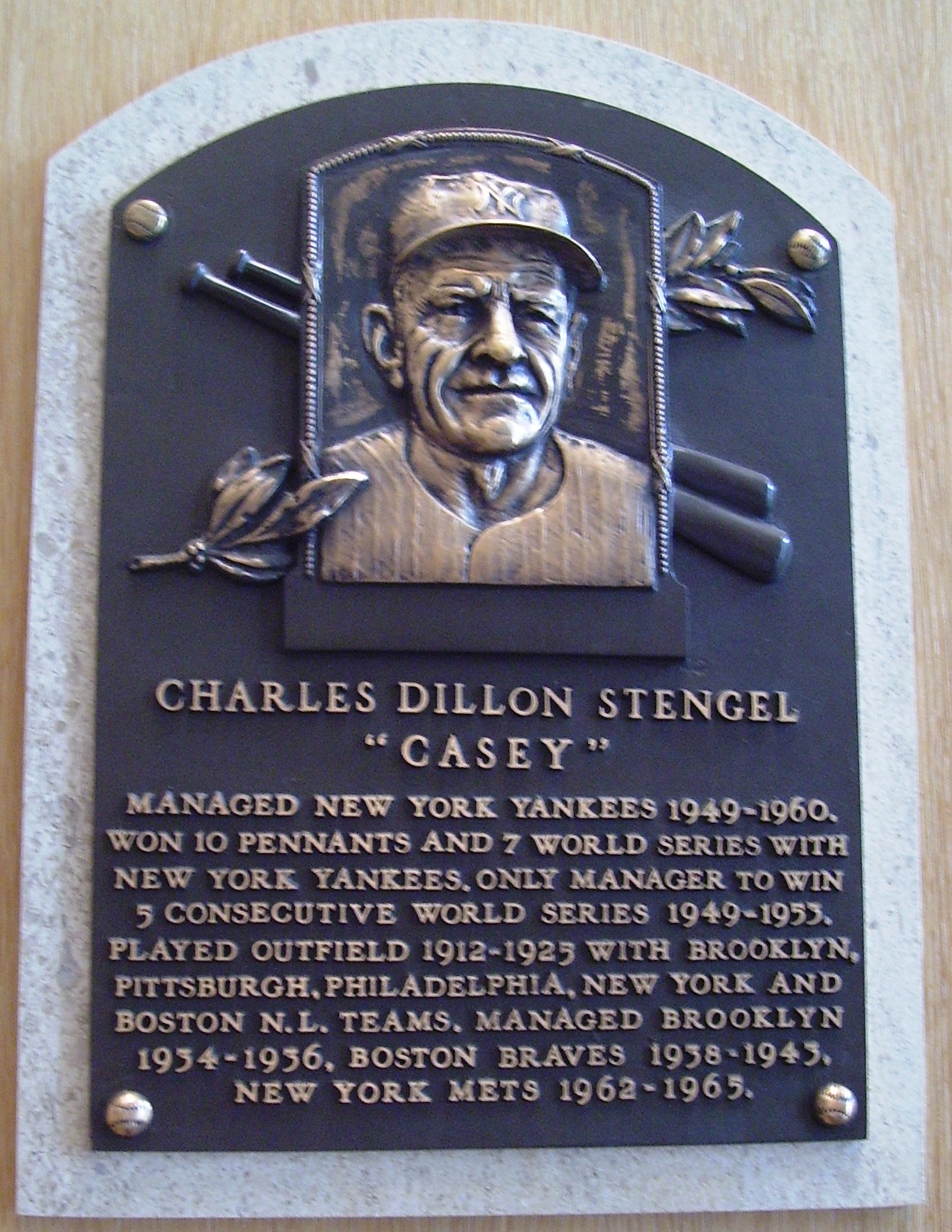
Casey Stengel, the 1962 Mets manager

The 1962 New York Mets season was the first regular season for the New York Mets of Major League Baseball (MLB), as the National League returned to New York City for the first time since 1957. They went 40–120 (.250) and finished tenth and last in the National League, 60 1/2 games behind the NL Champion San Francisco Giants, who had once called New York home. The Mets were the latest team to be 60+ games behind in a division before the 2018 Baltimore Orioles finished 61 games behind the World Series Champion Boston Red Sox. In one of the worst MLB seasons in the modern era and the National League since the 1952 Pittsburgh Pirates, the Mets lost 120 games, setting the record for the most losses in the era. Their losses became the second most when the 2024 Chicago White Sox lost their 121st game; though their winning percentage (.253) is still higher than the Mets' (.250). The Mets' starting pitchers also recorded a new major league low of just 23 wins all season.

The team lost its first game 11–4 to the St. Louis Cardinals on April 11 and went on to lose its first nine games. Their first win in franchise history came on April 23 in Pittsburgh in a 9–1 win over the Pittsburgh Pirates, which also resulted in the Pirates' first loss after a 10–0 start. Their first win in New York came on April 28 in a 9–4 win over the Philadelphia Phillies. Having repaired their record to 12–19 on May 20 after sweeping a doubleheader against the Milwaukee Braves, the Mets lost their next 17 games. They also lost 11 games straight from July 15 to July 26 and 13 games straight from August 9 to August 21. Their longest winning streak of the season was three wins.

The Mets were managed by former New York Yankees manager Casey Stengel and played their home games at the Polo Grounds, which was their temporary home while Shea Stadium was being built in Queens. They remain infamous for their ineptitude and were one of the worst teams in Major League Baseball history. The team's 120 losses were the third most by any MLB team, after the infamous 1899 Cleveland Spiders lost 134. Their team batting average, team earned run average (ERA), and team fielding percentage were all the worst in the major leagues that season.

Despite the team's terrible performance, fans came out in droves. Their 1962 season attendance of 922,530 was good enough for sixth in the National League.

The season was chronicled in Jimmy Breslin's humorous best-selling 1963 book Can't Anybody Here Play This Game? The title came from a remark made by manager Casey Stengel expressing frustration over his team's poor play.

One of the only bright spots was left fielder Frank Thomas, who hit .266 with 152 hits, 34 home runs, and 94 RBIs.

== Offseason ==
- July 20, 1961: Paul Blair was signed as an amateur free agent by the Mets.
- October 16, 1961: Billy Loes was purchased by the Mets from the San Francisco Giants.
- November 28, 1961: The Mets traded a player to be named later and cash to the Milwaukee Braves for Frank Thomas and a player to be named later. The deal was completed on May 21, 1962, when the Mets sent Gus Bell to the Braves, and the Braves sent Rick Herrscher to the Mets.
- January 30, 1962: Joe Ginsberg was signed as a free agent by the Mets.
- March 2, 1962: Billy Loes was returned by the Mets to the San Francisco Giants.

=== Expansion draft ===
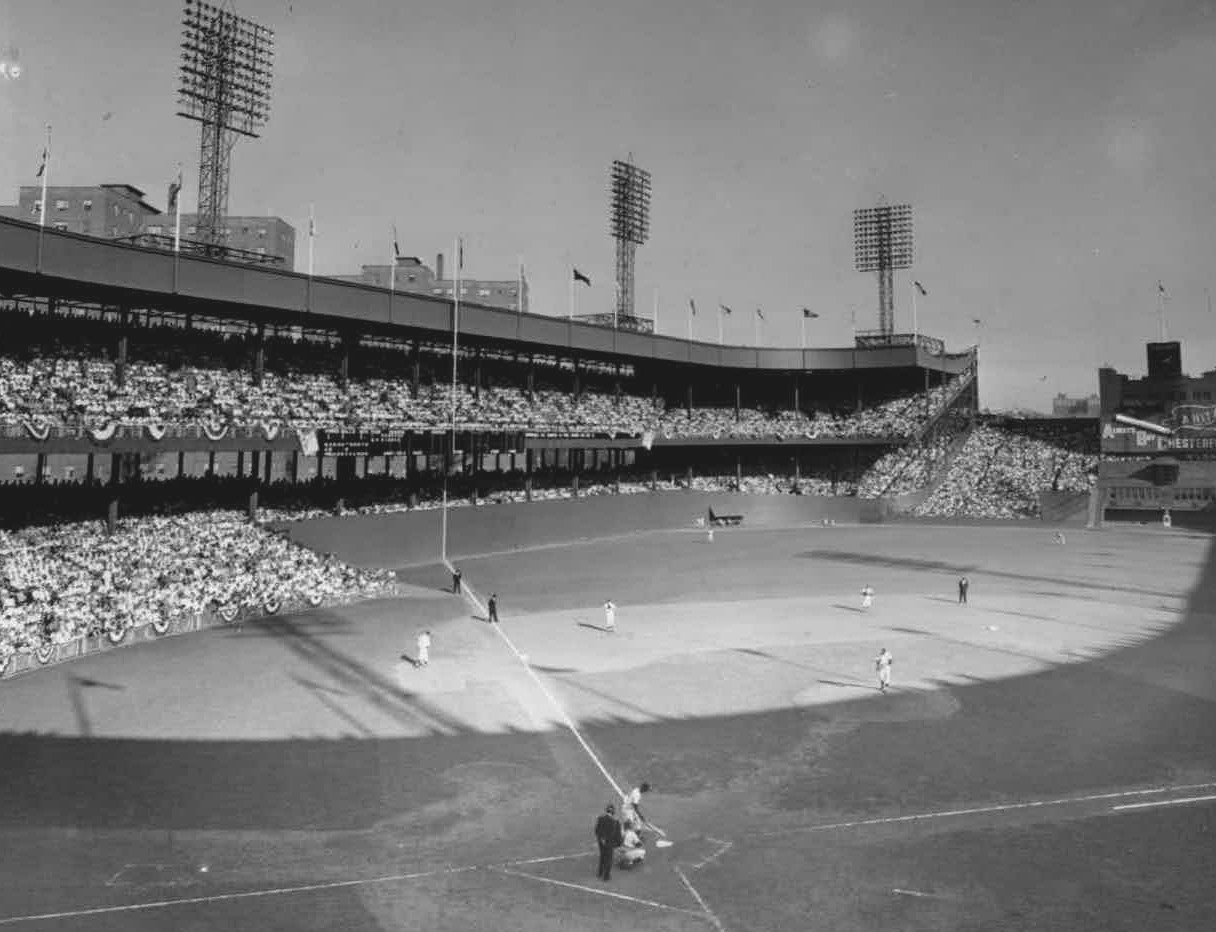
The Polo Grounds, where the Mets played their 1962 and 1963 seasons (1951 photograph)

- Craig Anderson, pitcher, St. Louis Cardinals
- Gus Bell, outfielder, Cincinnati Reds
- Ed Bouchee, infielder, Chicago Cubs
- Chris Cannizzaro, catcher, St. Louis Cardinals
- Elio Chacón, infielder, Cincinnati Reds
- Joe Christopher, outfielder, Pittsburgh Pirates
- Choo-Choo Coleman, catcher, Philadelphia Phillies
- Roger Craig, pitcher, Los Angeles Dodgers
- Ray Daviault, pitcher, San Francisco Giants
- John DeMerit, outfielder, Milwaukee Braves
- Sammy Drake, infielder, Chicago Cubs
- Jim Hickman, outfielder, St. Louis Cardinals
- Gil Hodges, infielder, Los Angeles Dodgers
- Jay Hook, pitcher, Cincinnati Reds
- Al Jackson, pitcher, Pittsburgh Pirates
- Sherman Jones, pitcher, Cincinnati Reds
- Hobie Landrith, catcher, San Francisco Giants
- Félix Mantilla, infielder, Milwaukee Braves
- Bob L. Miller, pitcher, St. Louis Cardinals
- Bobby Gene Smith, outfielder, Philadelphia Phillies
- Lee Walls, infielder/outfielder, Philadelphia Phillies
- Don Zimmer, infielder, Chicago Cubs

=== 1961 minor league affiliates ===
The Mets and Houston Colt .45s were established on October 17, 1960, giving them time to acquire minor league professional players, sign amateur free agents (there was no first-year MLB draft until 1965) and enter into working agreements with minor league affiliates during the 1961 season. New York had formal working agreements with three minor league baseball teams in 1961:

Level	Team	League	Manager
AA	Mobile Bears	Southern Association	Ernie White
B	Raleigh Capitals	Carolina League	Enos Slaughter
D	Lexington Indians	Western Carolinas League	Jack Hale

== Regular season ==
As an expansion team, the Mets were not expected to do well. They finished last in the National League, and they also finished 24 games behind their expansion brethren, the Colt .45s.

=== Season standings ===
National League
Team	W	L	Pct.	GB	Home	Road
San Francisco Giants	103	62	.624	—	61‍–‍21	42‍–‍41
Los Angeles Dodgers	102	63	.618	1	54‍–‍29	48‍–‍34
Cincinnati Reds	98	64	.605	3½	58‍–‍23	40‍–‍41
Pittsburgh Pirates	93	68	.578	8	51‍–‍30	42‍–‍38
Milwaukee Braves	86	76	.531	15½	49‍–‍32	37‍–‍44
St. Louis Cardinals	84	78	.519	17½	44‍–‍37	40‍–‍41
Philadelphia Phillies	81	80	.503	20	46‍–‍34	35‍–‍46
Houston Colt .45s	64	96	.400	36½	32‍–‍48	32‍–‍48
Chicago Cubs	59	103	.364	42½	32‍–‍49	27‍–‍54
New York Mets	40	120	.250	60½	22‍–‍58	18‍–‍62

=== Opening Day lineup ===
The first game in franchise history was played on the road, at Busch Stadium, St. Louis, on Wednesday night, April 11, 1962. The Mets fell behind 2–0 and 5–2 early, then narrowed the deficit to one run, but ultimately lost to the St. Louis Cardinals, 11–4. Former Brooklyn Dodgers Gil Hodges and Charlie Neal homered for the Mets, whose home opener at New York's Polo Grounds would wait until their second-ever official game, on Friday, April 13, 1962.

Opening Day Lineup
#	Name	Position
1	Richie Ashburn	CF
18	Félix Mantilla	SS
4	Charlie Neal	2B
25	Frank Thomas	LF
3	Gus Bell	RF
14	Gil Hodges	1B
17	Don Zimmer	3B
5	Hobie Landrith	C
38	Roger Craig	SP

=== Record vs. opponents ===
1962 National League record Sources:
Team	CHC	CIN	HOU	LAD	MIL	NYM	PHI	PIT	SF	STL
Chicago	—	4–14	7–11	4–14	8–10	9–9	10–8	4–14	6–12	7–11
Cincinnati	14–4	—	13–5	9–9	13–5	13–5	8–10	13–5	7–11	8–10
Houston	11–7	5–13	—	6–12	7–11	13–3–1	1–17	5–13	7–11	9–9–1
Los Angeles	14–4	9–9	12–6	—	10–8	16–2	14–4	10–8	10–11	7–11
Milwaukee	10–8	5–13	11–7	8–10	—	12–6	11–7	10–8	7–11	12–6
New York	9–9	5–13	3–13–1	2–16	6–12	—	4–14	2–16	4–14	5–13
Philadelphia	8–10	10–8	17–1	4–14	7–11	14–4	—	7–10	5–13	9–9
Pittsburgh	14–4	5–13	13–5	8–10	8–10	16–2	10–7	—	7–11	12–6
San Francisco	12–6	11–7	11–7	11–10	11–7	14–4	13–5	11–7	—	9–9
St. Louis	11–7	10–8	9–9–1	11–7	6–12	13–5	9–9	6–12	9–9	—

=== Notable transactions ===
- April 26, 1962: Harry Chiti was purchased by the Mets from the Cleveland Indians.
- April 26, 1962: Bob Smith was traded by the Mets to the Chicago Cubs for Sammy Taylor.
- May 1, 1962: Joe Ginsberg was released by the Mets.
- May 7, 1962: Don Zimmer was traded by the Mets to the Cincinnati Reds for Bob G. Miller and Cliff Cook.
- May 7, 1962: Jim Marshall was traded by the Mets to the Pittsburgh Pirates for Vinegar Bend Mizell.
- May 9, 1962: Marv Throneberry was sold by the Baltimore Orioles to the New York Mets.
- June 7, 1962 The New York Mets sell Hobie Landrith to the Orioles.
- June 15, 1962: Harry Chiti was returned by the Mets to the Cleveland Indians.
- June 27, 1962: Ed Kranepool was signed as an amateur free agent by the Mets.
- August 4, 1962: Vinegar Bend Mizell was released by the Mets.
- September 7, 1962: Galen Cisco was selected off waivers by the Mets from the Boston Red Sox.

== Roster ==
1962 New York Mets
Roster
Pitchers: 20 Craig Anderson; 26 Galen Cisco; 38 Roger Craig; 35 Ray Daviault; 27 Larry Foss; 27,34 Dave Hillman; 47 Jay Hook; 29 Willard Hunter; 15 Al Jackson; 36 Sherman Jones; 41 Clem Labine; 19 Ken MacKenzie; 36 Bob G. Miller; 24 Bob L. Miller; 26 Vinegar Bend Mizell; 26 Herb Moford; 22 Bob Moorhead	Catchers: 8 Chris Cannizzaro; 44 Harry Chiti; 17 Choo-Choo Coleman; 12 Joe Ginsberg; 5 Hobie Landrith; 5 Joe Pignatano; 16 Sammy Taylor; Infielders: 11,3 Ed Bouchee; 7 Elio Chacón; 6 Cliff Cook; 12 Sammy Drake; 6 Rick Herrscher; 14 Gil Hodges; 10 Rod Kanehl; 21 Ed Kranepool; 6 Jim Marshall; 18 Félix Mantilla; 4 Charlie Neal; 2 Marv Throneberry; 17 Don Zimmer	Outfielders: 1 Richie Ashburn; 3 Gus Bell; 23 Joe Christopher; 29 John DeMerit; 9 Jim Hickman; 16 Bobby Gene Smith; 25 Frank Thomas; 11 Gene Woodling	Manager: 37 Casey Stengel; Coaches: 52 Solly Hemus (Third base); 53 Rogers Hornsby (Hitting); 48 Red Kress; 51 Cookie Lavagetto (First base); 54 Red Ruffing (Pitching)

== Player stats ==
= Indicates team leader

=== Batting ===
==== Starters by position ====
Note: Pos = Position; G = Games played; AB = At bats; H = Hits; Avg. = Batting average; HR = Home runs; RBI = Runs batted in

Pos	Player	G	AB	H	Avg.	HR	RBI
C	Chris Cannizzaro	59	133	32	.241	0	9
1B	Marv Throneberry	116	357	87	.244	16	49
2B	Charlie Neal	136	508	132	.260	11	58
3B	Félix Mantilla	141	466	128	.275	11	59
SS	Elio Chacón	118	368	87	.236	2	27
LF	Frank Thomas	156	571	152	.266	34	94
CF	Jim Hickman	140	392	96	.245	13	46
RF	Joe Christopher	119	271	66	.244	6	32

==== Other batters ====
Note: G = Games played; AB = At bats; H = Hits; Avg. = Batting average; HR = Home runs; RBI = Runs batted in

Player	G	AB	H	Avg.	HR	RBI
Richie Ashburn	135	389	119	.306	7	28
Rod Kanehl	133	351	87	.248	4	27
Gene Woodling	81	190	52	.274	5	24
Sammy Taylor	68	158	35	.222	3	20
Choo Choo Coleman	55	152	38	.250	6	17
Gil Hodges	54	127	32	.252	9	17
Cliff Cook	40	112	26	.232	2	9
Gus Bell	30	101	15	.149	1	6
Ed Bouchee	50	87	14	.161	3	10
Joe Pignatano	27	56	13	.232	0	2
Sammy Drake	25	52	10	.192	0	7
Don Zimmer	14	52	4	.077	0	1
Rick Herrscher	35	50	11	.220	1	6
Hobie Landrith	23	45	13	.289	1	7
Harry Chiti	15	41	8	.195	0	0
Jim Marshall	17	32	11	.344	3	4
Bob Smith	8	22	3	.136	0	2
John DeMerit	14	16	3	.188	1	1
Ed Kranepool	3	6	1	.167	0	0
Joe Ginsberg	2	5	0	.000	0	0

=== Pitching ===
= Indicates league leader

==== Starting pitchers ====
Note: G = Games pitched; IP = Innings pitched; W = Wins; L = Losses; ERA = Earned run average; SO = Strikeouts

Player	G	IP	W	L	ERA	SO
Roger Craig	42	233.1	10	24	4.51	118
Al Jackson	36	231.1	8	20	4.40	118
Jay Hook	37	213.2	8	19	4.84	113

==== Other pitchers ====
Note: G = Games pitched; IP = Innings pitched; W = Wins; L = Losses; ERA = Earned run average; SO = Strikeouts

Player	G	IP	W	L	SV	ERA	SO
Bob L. Miller	33	143.2	1	12	0	4.89	91
Craig Anderson	50	131.1	3	17	4	5.35	62
Bob Moorhead	38	105.1	0	2	0	4.53	63
Willard Hunter	27	63.0	1	6	0	5.57	40
Sherman Jones	8	23.1	0	4	0	7.71	11
Galen Cisco	4	19.1	1	1	0	3.26	13
Larry Foss	5	11.2	0	1	0	4.63	3

==== Relief pitchers ====
Note: G = Games pitched; W = Wins; L = Losses; SV = Saves; ERA = Earned run average; SO = Strikeouts

Player	G	IP	W	L	SV	ERA	SO
Ray Daviault	36	81.0	1	5	0	6.22	51
Ken MacKenzie	42	80.0	5	4	1	4.95	51
Vinegar Bend Mizell	17	38.0	0	2	0	7.34	15
Bob G. Miller	17	20.1	2	2	1	7.08	8
Dave Hillman	13	16.2	0	0	1	6.32	8
Herb Moford	7	15.0	0	1	0	7.20	5
Clem Labine	3	4.0	0	0	0	11.25	2

== Awards and honors ==
=== League top five finishers ===
Richie Ashburn

- #3 in NL in bases on balls (81)

Roger Craig

- MLB leader in losses (24)
- #2 in NL in home runs allowed (35)
- #3 in NL in earned runs allowed (117)

Jay Hook

- #4 in NL in earned runs allowed (115)
- #4 in NL in home runs allowed (31)

Al Jackson

- #2 in NL in losses (20)

== Farm system ==
=== 1962 minor league affiliates ===
Level	Team	League	Manager
AAA	Syracuse Chiefs	International League	Frank Verdi and Johnny Vander Meer
C	Santa Barbara Rancheros	California League	Gene Lillard
D	Quincy Jets	Midwest League	Ken Deal
D	Auburn Mets	New York–Penn League	Dick Cole

LEAGUE CHAMPIONS: Auburn
Syracuse affiliation shared with Washington Senators
