= The Great American Baseball Card Flipping, Trading and Bubble Gum Book =

- Author: Brendan C. Boyd; Fred C. Harris
- Language: English
- Genre: Sports
- Publisher: Little, Brown & Co.
- Publication date: 1973; 53 years ago
- Publication place: United States
- Media type: Print (hardback & paperback)
- Pages: 152, Illustrated with color photographic reproductions
- ISBN: 0-316-10429-9
- OCLC: 694032
- Dewey Decimal: 796.357/0973/075 21
- LC Class: GV875.3 .B69 1973

The Great American Baseball Card Flipping, Trading and Bubble Gum Book is a book written by Brendan C. Boyd and Fred C. Harris about baseball cards, primarily ones issued during the authors' youth in 1950s, and the players on the cards.

The book was published by Little, Brown & Co. in October 1973, two years after Roger Kahn's The Boys of Summer sparked nostalgia for 1950s baseball.

After several years of being out of print, Seamhead Books reprinted the book in April 2015, with some new contents.

== Authors ==
Neither Boyd nor Harris had published a book nor possessed any special expertise in the field of sports or sports memorabilia when they decided to write The Great American Baseball Card Flipping, Trading and Bubble Gum Book. In 1970, while working at a Boston bookstore, a customer inquired about books on baseball cards. Surprised to learn that there weren't any books on the subject, Harris told Boyd, "We should write one." So they pored over the cards they had collected in their youth and wrote The Great American Baseball Card Flipping, Trading and Bubble Gum Book. Although the book doesn't indicate which author contributed which parts, generally Boyd (from Boston) covered American League players and Harris (from Philadelphia) covered National League players. In the introduction to the 1991 edition, Boyd writes that several publishers declined to publish it: "an editor at McGraw Hill turned it down as 'too flip.' (Get it?baseball cards? Flip?) We weren't just getting rejections now, we were getting cute rejections."

"Then Roger Kahn intervened (inadvertently, I'm sure.) He wrote The Boys of Summer. It quickly became a bestseller. We submitted our proposal to Little, Brown, detailing the resemblances between Kahn's book and ours. 'Baseball nostalgia is the next big thing,' we lobbied shamelessly."

Brendan C. Boyd wrote another book, published in 1993, titled Blue Ruin: A Novel of the 1919 World Series. Fred C. Harris owns the Great American Baseball Company.

== Subject matter ==
The Great American Baseball Card Flipping, Trading and Bubble Gum Book, presents a humorous and usually irreverent account of the baseball cards that were distributed during the authors' youths and of the players depicted on the cards. The basic format consists of an image of a card of a player, or in a few instances a manager or umpire, accompanied by a short characterization of the card and the player. The commentary for each card ranges from a single sentence to a few hundred words. Unlike most sports-related books, the vast majority of players featured in this book possessed mediocre talent and had been largely forgotten by 1973.

The book is not a baseball card guide in any respect and makes no pretense of being one—there's no indication what a card is worth or even that it has any intrinsic value other than the memories it invokes. Baseball card collecting in 1973 was primarily a childhood activity and usually abandoned by young adulthood. The authors' stated assumption is that the cards one collected in his youth are all gone, as revealed in the book's closing comments, "We know, your mother, your own mother, threw them away." Instead, the authors present a nostalgic look at the part of their youth that involved collecting, trading, and flipping baseball cards.

== Sections ==
The book is divided into four sections:

- Where Have You Gone Vince DiMaggio (Some Reflections On a Baseball Card Childhood)
- This Kid Is Going to Make It
- Profiles
- Some Final Observations on Trading, Hoarding, Collecting and Other Aberrations of the Baseball Card Life

The first section reminisces in a rapid-fire stream of consciousness flow about growing up and eventually coming of age in 1950s suburban America with Pez, cap-guns, Jujubes, and baseball cards. The second delves into the Topps trading card company and its pioneering executive Sy Berger circa 1973. "There was Topps and then there was Topps," Harris says in the introduction to the 1991 reissue.

The bulk and the heart of the book is the section called "Profiles," containing the card images and player biographies. Usually one or two players are featured per page and the biography is by no means meant to be complete or unbiased, but rather a quick snapshot of what the authors remembered most about the player. n all there are 221 baseball players featured with no stated or apparent reason for their selection, although it can be gathered that many were picked for the humorous potential in some aspect of the player or the card itself. Most of the cards were issued from 1951 to 1963 with a few later ones included.

The last section of the book offers a short discourse on things to do with cards, from hoarding, trading, to finally collecting. The ending foreshadows the adult hobby of collecting baseball cards that was about to explode, although it is unlikely the authors predicted this.

== Themes and threads ==
The book is not written in a linear fashion. Each card and its accompanying commentary, with a few rare exceptions, stand alone and are not categorized, such as by team, league, era, position, etc. The ultimate effect of the seemingly scattershot arrangement is that the reader can start most anywhere and jump about without any loss of comprehension. That said, there are unstated themes that run through the book, or they could be described as threads that hold the story together.

=== Star players vs. journeymen players ===
Unlike most sports books—especially those about baseball players of the 1950s and early 1960s, The Great American Baseball Card Flipping, Trading and Bubble Gum Book shifts its focus from the era’s stars to its overlooked and long-forgotten players. That choice ultimately defines the book and gives it its distinctive perspective.

The great players, however, are not ignored; in fact, of the 221 presented, 15 are in the Baseball Hall of Fame. Among the stars mentioned are Sandy Koufax (seen on his rookie card which is dubbed his “Bar Mitzvah picture” because he looks so young), Ernie Banks (remembered for having played on bad teams and being loved by everyone), Stan Musial (because of the unsolved mystery of why there was no card of him in 1950 and 1951) and Yogi Berra (because he's Yogi Berra). Those who didn't get mentioned include Hank Aaron, Warren Spahn, Harmon Killebrew, Frank Robinson, Whitey Ford, and Roger Maris. Mickey Mantle is mentioned, but not only is his card not shown, it's belittled for having been so abundant one year.

=== Forgotten players ===
It can be said that the book "is about players who have long since been forgotten by everybody but those who grew up collecting their cards and thinking them important simply because they were Major League ballplayers. The primary reason many of these players have been forgotten is because they weren’t very good, and that is how Boyd and Harris have remembered them: Some because they couldn’t field well, such as Dick Stuart and Marv Throneberry, quite a few, including Doug Camilli and Eddie Miksis, because they couldn’t hit, or Casey Wise, who really couldn't hit; and of course those who couldn’t pitch, like Dave DeBusschere and Eli Grba (of whom the authors report, "In addition to having the hardest name to pronounce in the big leagues he also had just about the worst stuff.")

=== Players with funny names ===
Several players are recalled because they had confusing or unusual names: Wayne Terwilliger, Calvin Coolidge Julius Caesar Tuskahoma McLish, Coot Veal, "Cot" Deal, Whammy Douglas, and Foster Castleman. The book has this to say about Foster Castleman, “Of course a ballplayer with a name like this is never going to amount to anything. If you have a name like an orthodontist you’re going to play like an orthodontist. The guy never really had a shot.” One item amusing to the authors was the player named Boyd Gail Harris, whose full name coincidentally matches the two authors' last names plus one of the authors' wife's name.

=== Entries about the card ===
A good many of the capsules in the profiles section are more about the baseball card itself than the player depicted. In some the authors remark about the prevalence or difficulty in obtaining the card: "Toby Atwell has to be remembered by any serious collector of baseball cards in 1952 as having been one of the most difficult cards to acquire," the authors write. "The career of Toby Atwell as player was secondary to the career of Toby Atwell as baseball card, and if you needed him to complete your set too, you'll know what I mean." In many others, Harris and Boyd point out some absurdity, such as slipshod graphics, an absurd remark about the player, or the player's silly pose or expression. One example is Bob Cerv's 1958 Topps card, where it looks as if he's whacking himself in the head with his bat. Another card fitting this category is that of pitcher Harvey Haddix, who is best remembered for once having pitched 12 1/3 innings of perfect baseball only to lose the game in the 13th inning after allowing one hit. He is shown with a forlorn smile. The bio tells us that it “is the reluctantly self-deprecating smile of the perennially dumped-on, the wry smile of the universal victim, the man who expects very little of his peers and knows secretly that he’s going to have to settle for quite a good deal less.”

== Style ==
Much of the book's humor and thus its appeal derives from the authors' style. Although there are notable exceptions, for the most part the overt writing style could be characterized as breezy, goofy, and irreverent, at times to the point of being ridiculing. Somewhat curiously though, perhaps because of the reader's awareness of the authors' respect for the game and the inherent difficulty of playing it at the major league level, the ultimate effect is to glorify the effort made by the humdrum player because he was part of game that was a significant part of one's youth. The following two quotes from the book are representative of the style used in the "Profiles" section:

Quick, name a major league baseball player who was born in San Remo, Italy, lived in Windsor, Ontario, Canada, and couldn't hit. That's right--Reno Bertoia. OK. Name another one. The back of Reno's card is interesting. It says that his average last year was .162 and that, although he did not get to play in too many ballgames, he gained valuable information about American League hurlers that would help him in the future. I suspect that the information he gathered was that every pitcher in the American League could get him out, and that perhaps he should try another line of work.

Now, it is not necessary for me to declare that Hector Lopez was the worst fielding third baseman in the history of baseball. Everyone knows that. It is more or less a matter of public record. But I do feel called upon somehow to try to indicate, if only for the historical archivists among us, the sheer depths of his innovative barbarousness. Hector Lopez was a butcher. Pure and Simple. A butcher. His range was about one step to either side, his hands seemed to be made of concrete and his defensive attitude was so cavalier and arbitrary as to hardly constitute an attitude at all. Hector did not simply field a groundball, he attacked it. Like a farmer trying to kill a snake with a stick. And his mishandling of routine infield flies was the sort of which legends are made. Hector Lopez was not just a bad fielder for a third baseman. In fact, Hector Lopez was not just a bad fielder for a baseball player. Hector Lopez was, when every factor has been taken into consideration, a bad fielder for a human being. The stands are full of obnoxious leather-lunged cretins who insist they can play better than most major leaguers. Well, in Hector's case they could have been right. I would like to go on record right here and now as declaring Hector Lopez the all-time worst fielding major league ballplayer. That's quite a responsibility there, Hector, but I have every confidence you'll be able to live up to it.

There are a few notable exceptions to the satirical style, in which straightforward reverence is paid, usually to the game's greats. The card for Ted Williams says simply, "In 1955, there were 77,263,127 male American human beings. And every one of them in his heart of hearts would have given two arms, a leg and his collection of Davy Crockett iron-ons to be Teddy Ballgame."

The commentary accompanying Satchel Paige's card lists Mr. Paige's oft-quoted "Rules for Staying Young" and concludes with the authors' own prophetic pronouncement: "Satchel Paige could have been the greatest pitcher in major league history, if he'd been given the chance. Don't look back, America, something might be gaining on you."

And the cards of Jackie Robinson and Roberto Clemente, in honor of their notable off-field heroics and recent deaths, are each posted on a black background with no comment at all.

== Reviews, citations and legacy ==
Although the book was never a bestseller and spent much more time out-of-print than in print since its publication (and then reprint edition in 2015), it has nonetheless attained a cult following and been frequently cited by many publications and online resources. It is excerpted in Baseball: A Literary Anthology, where Nicholas Dawidoff calls it "baseball writing's answer to free jazz. The book consists of a series of reproductions of 1950s baseball cards and the authors' annotations—spirited riffs on matters ranging from Smoky Burgess's heft, to Don Mossi's ears, to Vern Stephens' pop flies."

Perhaps the book's most lasting legacy is the contribution it made, albeit unwittingly, to the adult hobby of card collecting. Harris and Boyd, like many other boys who grew up in the 1950s and 1960s, collected cards as youths, lost interest in the hobby in their teens, and rekindled the hobby in as adults. Harris and Boyd wrote a book about baseball cards because at the time there were no books about baseball cards.
