= Rick Herrscher =

American baseball and basketball player (born 1936)

- Utility player
- Born: November 3, 1936 (age 89); St. Louis, Missouri, U.S.
- Batted: Right Threw: Right

MLB debut
- August 1, 1962, for the New York Mets

Last MLB appearance
- September 26, 1962, for the New York Mets

MLB statistics
- Batting average: .220
- Home runs: 1
- Runs batted in: 6
- Stats at Baseball Reference

Teams
- New York Mets (1962)

Richard Franklin Herrscher (born November 3, 1936) is an American former professional baseball infielder who appeared in 35 Major League Baseball games for the 1962 New York Mets. Born in St. Louis, Missouri, he threw and batted right-handed and was listed as 6 feet 2 inches (1.88 m) tall and 187 pounds (85 kg).

Herrscher attended Cleveland High School in St. Louis and Southern Methodist University. He was signed by the Milwaukee Braves as an amateur free agent in 1958. After four seasons in the minor leagues, he was traded to the New York Mets in May 1962 as the player to be named later to complete an offseason deal that had delivered veteran National League slugger Frank Thomas to New York.

Recalled by the Mets after spending four months of the 1962 campaign at Triple-A, Herrscher made his MLB debut on August 1, 1962, against the Philadelphia Phillies as a pinch hitter for Choo-Choo Coleman. Facing southpaw Dennis Bennett, he reached based on an error by second baseman Tony Taylor. Four days later, he hit his only major-league home run, a three-run smash against Jim O'Toole of the Cincinnati Reds that was a key blow in a 5–2 triumph, one of the Mets' 40 victories during their historically futile maiden MLB season. His final major league appearance came on September 26, 1962, when he collected two hits, including a double, in three at bats against Denny Lemaster of the Braves, his original team.

In all, Herrscher batted .220 with six runs batted in in 50 MLB at bats; his 11 hits included three doubles and his August 5 home run. In the field, he started six games at first base, three at second base and one at shortstop. He made two errors in 104 total chances for a fielding percentage of .981. He returned to the minors in 1963 and 1964 before leaving baseball.

Herrscher also played professional basketball for the Long Beach Chiefs/Hawaii Chiefs in 1961–1963.
