= Bob Miller (pitcher, born 1935) =

American baseball player (1935–2022)

- Pitcher
- Born: July 15, 1935; Berwyn, Illinois, U.S.
- Died: May 24, 2022 (aged 86); St. Charles, Illinois, U.S.
- Batted: Right Threw: Left

MLB debut
- June 25, 1953, for the Detroit Tigers

Last MLB appearance
- September 18, 1962, for the New York Mets

MLB statistics
- Win–loss record: 6–8
- Earned run average: 4.72
- Strikeouts: 75
- Stats at Baseball Reference

Teams
- Detroit Tigers (1953–1956); Cincinnati Reds (1962); New York Mets (1962)

Robert Gerald Miller (July 15, 1935 – May 24, 2022) was an American professional baseball pitcher who played for three different teams during his Major League Baseball (MLB) career. During the 1953 season, he was the youngest player in the major leagues, one of only three players who were 17 years old. Born in Berwyn, Illinois, Miller was a left-hander who batted right-handed. He was listed as 6 feet 1 inch (1.85 m) tall and weighed 185 pounds (84 kg).

Miller had a 33–6 won–lost record in three seasons at Morton East High School, including three no-hitters. In his final season in high school, Miller pitched two no-hitters and had 106 strikeouts in the nine games he pitched.

== Professional career ==
=== Detroit Tigers (1953–56) ===
Miller was signed as a "bonus baby" amateur free agent by the Detroit Tigers on June 20, 1953, receiving a $60,000 signing bonus from the team, who outbid the Philadelphia Phillies and Chicago White Sox for his services. The other Tigers' bonus baby signed that day was future-Hall of Famer Al Kaline, who received a bonus of $35,000 and had been pursued by every major league team other than the St. Louis Browns. As required by the Bonus Rule as it existed when he was signed, the Tigers had to immediately place Miller on their 40-man roster and keep him there for two years.

Miller made his major league debut on June 25, less than a week after being signed to the team. Taking the mound at age 17, he was the youngest Tiger hurler to start a game. Miller finished the 1953 season with a 1–2 record in 13 appearances (all but one in relief), and an ERA of 5.94 in 36 1/3 innings of work.

In the 1954 season he had a 1–1 record and the only save of his career, appearing in 22 games (all but one in relief) and ending with a 2.45 ERA in 69 2/3 innings. In the 1955 season he pitched to a 2–1 record in seven appearances (three of them starts, including his only complete game) and ending with an ERA of 2.49 in 25 1/3 innings. Miller finished with an 0–2 record in the 1956 season in 11 appearances (all but three in relief), and his ERA ballooned to 5.68 in 35 2/3 innings of work.

Miller spent the entire 1957 season performing military service, then played exclusively at the minor-league from 1958 through 1961.

=== Cincinnati Reds (1962) ===
Miller was drafted by the Cincinnati Reds from the Tigers on November 30, 1959, in the 1959 minor league draft. The Reds brought him up for the 1962 season, and he appeared in six games, all in relief, between April 9 and 29. He was treated roughly, permitting 14 hits and 13 earned runs for an ERA of 21.94 in 5 1/3 innings of work for Cincinnati.

=== New York Mets (1962) ===
The Reds traded Miller along with Cliff Cook to the New York Mets on May 7, 1962, in exchange for Don Zimmer. One of two pitchers on the Mets inaugural squad sharing the name Bob Miller, Mets manager Casey Stengel would call right-hander Bob L. Miller by the name "Nelson", perhaps to distinguish him from this Bob Miller, or just general confusion on Stengel's part.

With the Mets, Miller finished the season with a 2–2 record in 17 appearances, all in relief, and had an ERA of 7.08 in 20 1/3 innings. Miller's final major league appearance was on September 18, 1962, in the second game of a doubleheader against the Houston Colt .45s, with Miller retiring the last three batters in the ninth inning of a game the Mets lost 8–6 at the Polo Grounds. The '62 Mets ended up with a record of 40–120, most losses of any team in Major League Baseball's modern history.

== Career statistics ==
Career pitching
W	L	G	GS	CG	SHO	GF	Sv	IP	H	R	ER	HR	BB	K	HBP	ERA	WHIP
6	8	86	8	1	0	48	2	188.7	206	114	99	15	92	75	4	4.72	1.580

== Sources ==
- Career statistics from MLB · Baseball Reference · Baseball Reference (Minors) · Retrosheet · Baseball Almanac
