= Craig Anderson (1960s pitcher) =

American baseball player (born 1938)

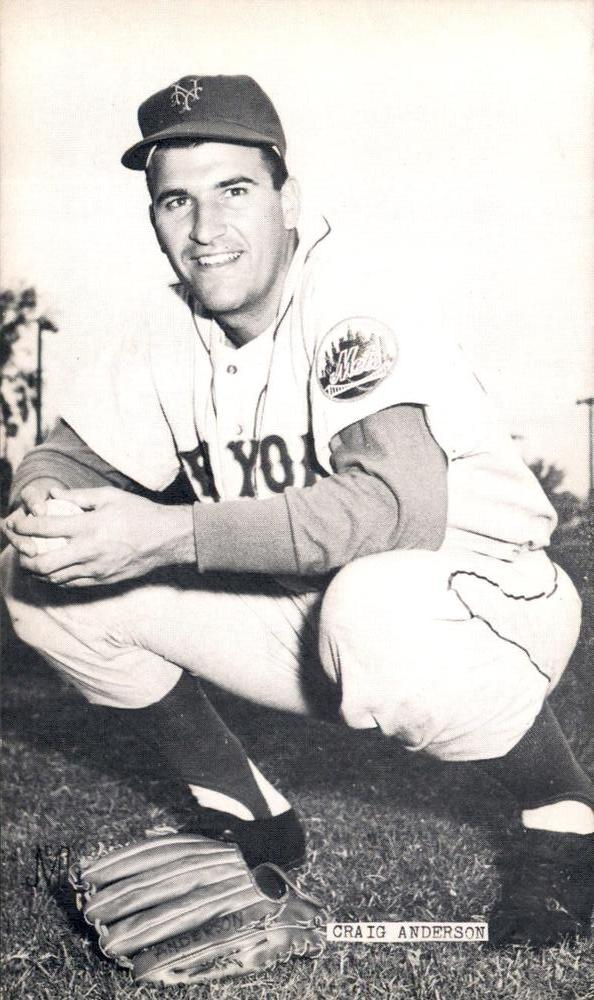
- Anderson with the New York Mets in 1962
- Pitcher
- Born: July 1, 1938 (age 88); Washington, D.C., U.S.
- Batted: Right Threw: Right

MLB debut
- June 23, 1961, for the St. Louis Cardinals

Last MLB appearance
- May 31, 1964, for the New York Mets

MLB statistics
- Win–loss record: 7–23
- Earned run average: 5.10
- Strikeouts: 94
- Stats at Baseball Reference

Teams
- St. Louis Cardinals (1961); New York Mets (1962–1964)

Norman Craig Anderson (born July 1, 1938) is an American former professional baseball pitcher, who played Major League Baseball (MLB) for the St. Louis Cardinals and New York Mets for all or parts of four seasons (1961–1964). A native of Washington, D.C., he threw and batted right-handed and was listed as 6 feet 2 inches (1.88 m) tall and 205 pounds (93 kg).

== Scholastic career ==
Anderson attended Anacostia High School from 1953 to 1956. He played football, basketball, and baseball.

Anderson attended Lehigh University, playing both varsity football and varsity baseball. He graduated with a bachelor's degree in Business Administration in 1960 and then went on to earn an M.Ed. in Business Education from Southern Illinois University Carbondale in 1966.

== Playing career ==
Anderson signed with the Cardinals as an amateur free agent prior to the 1960 season. He made his MLB debut on June 23, 1961.

Anderson was selected by the Mets in the 1961 MLB Expansion Draft, on October 10, 1961. He played 1962–1964 with the Mets. Anderson led the 1962 Mets in appearances and saves. It was a team that ended up with a record of 40–120, the most losses by any Major MLB team in one season.

On May 12, 1962, Anderson was the winning pitcher on both ends of the first double-header the Mets ever won. After winning those two games against the Milwaukee Braves, he lost his last 16 decisions that season. (The losing streak would end at 19 games when Anderson's big league career ended, on May 31, 1964.) In that twin-bill, he became the first Mets pitcher to record two wins in a single day; only two other Mets pitchers since have accomplished this: Willard Hunter and Jesse Orosco.

On September 18, 1963, Anderson was the losing pitcher in the last baseball game ever played at the Polo Grounds, when the Philadelphia Phillies, behind lefty Chris Short, beat the Mets 5–1.

In 82 games (17 starts), Anderson finished with a career record of 7 wins, 23 losses, 94 strikeouts, 192.1 innings pitched, 34 games finished, and an earned run average (ERA) of 5.10.
