= Gary Kroll =

American baseball player (born 1941)

- Pitcher
- Born: July 8, 1941 (age 85); Culver City, California, U.S.
- Batted: Right Threw: Right

MLB debut
- July 26, 1964, for the Philadelphia Phillies

Last MLB appearance
- July 12, 1969, for the Cleveland Indians

MLB statistics
- Win–loss record: 6–7
- Earned run average: 4.24
- Strikeouts: 138
- Stats at Baseball Reference

Teams
- Philadelphia Phillies (1964); New York Mets (1964–1965); Houston Astros (1966); Cleveland Indians (1969)

Gary Melvin Kroll (born July 8, 1941) is an American former professional baseball pitcher, who played in Major League Baseball (MLB) between 1964 and 1969. He appeared in a total of 71 major-league games for the Philadelphia Phillies, New York Mets, Houston Astros, and Cleveland Indians. During his playing days, Kroll was listed at 6 feet 6 inches (1.98 m) and 220 pounds (100 kg).

== Biography ==
Kroll, a native of Culver City, California, graduated from Reseda High School and attended Brigham Young University and Los Angeles Pierce College.

Kroll signed with the Phillies in 1959 and spent 51/2 seasons in their farm system, before his MLB debut, on July 26, 1964. After only two appearances, he was traded to the Mets for veteran first baseman Frank Thomas on August 7. As a rookie pitcher in 1964, Kroll committed a league-leading four balks in just ten games and 242/3 innings pitched.

In his only full year in the majors, 1965, Kroll worked in 32 games for the Mets, including 11 starting assignments. He won six games and lost six, recorded his only MLB complete game (a four-hit, 7–1 victory over the San Francisco Giants on April 18), and his only save (on July 25 against the Phillies).

Kroll finished his big league career with six wins, seven defeats, and an earned run average (ERA) of 4.24. In 1591/3 innings pitched, he surrendered 147 hits, yielded 91 walks, and recorded 138 strikeouts.

After his retirement from pitching professionally in 1971, Kroll settled in Tulsa, Oklahoma, with his wife, Barbara, and five children. The Krolls have five grandchildren.
