= Ken MacKenzie (baseball) =

Canadian baseball player (1934–2023)

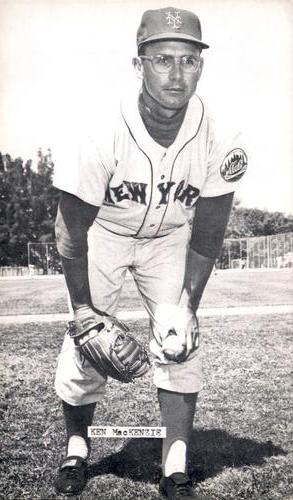
- MacKenzie in 1962
- Pitcher
- Born: March 10, 1934; Gore Bay, Ontario, Canada
- Died: December 14, 2023 (aged 89); Guilford, Connecticut, U.S.
- Batted: Right Threw: Left

MLB debut
- May 2, 1960, for the Milwaukee Braves

Last MLB appearance
- August 4, 1965, for the Houston Astros

MLB statistics
- Win–loss record: 8–10
- Earned run average: 4.80
- Strikeouts: 142
- Stats at Baseball Reference

Teams
- Milwaukee Braves (1960–1961); New York Mets (1962–1963); St. Louis Cardinals (1963); San Francisco Giants (1964); Houston Astros (1965)

Kenneth Purvis MacKenzie (March 10, 1934 – December 14, 2023) was a Canadian relief pitcher in Major League Baseball. He played with the Milwaukee Braves (1960–61), New York Mets (1962–63), St. Louis Cardinals (1963), San Francisco Giants (1964), and Houston Astros (1965).

== Early life ==
A member of Yale's Class of 1956, MacKenzie lettered in hockey and baseball at Yale University. He returned to Yale as head baseball coach in 1969 and held that post for ten seasons. The native of Gore Bay, Ontario, threw left-handed, batted right-handed, and was listed as 6 feet (1.83 m) tall and 185 pounds (84 kg) (13 stone, 3 pounds).

== Career ==
MacKenzie signed with the Braves in 1956 and began working his way through the club's farm system, becoming a relief specialist in 1959, his third professional baseball season. After working in 14 games for Milwaukee in brief trials in 1960 and 1961, his contract was sold to the expansion Mets on October 11, 1961, one day after that year's expansion draft.

An original Met, MacKenzie posted a 5–4 record and was the only man among 17 pitchers on the 1962 Mets to win more games than he lost on a team which suffered 120 defeats. Manager Casey Stengel said of him: "He's a splendid young fella with a great education from Yale University. His signing with us makes him the lowest paid member of the class of Yale '56." In 1963, MacKenzie again was the Mets' lone over-.500 pitcher, winning three of four decisions for a team which would lose 111 games. MacKenzie, however, was traded to the pennant-contending St. Louis Cardinals on August 5, 1963. MacKenzie recorded eight wins, five losses, and four saves, with a 4.96 earned run average over 76 games pitched for the Mets. Those eight victories would be his only Major League Baseball wins.

MacKenzie bounced from the Cardinals to the Giants to the Astros through the 1965 campaign, spending time in Triple-A in the process.

All told, he won eight of 18 decisions in 129 games pitched (all but one as a reliever), with five career saves. In 2081/3 innings pitched, he allowed 231 hits and 63 walks with 142 strikeouts.

== Post-MLB career ==
MacKenzie coached baseball and ice hockey at Yale between 1969 and 1979. He moved to the Yale alumni office following his coaching tenure, retiring in 1984.

On August 27, 2022, MacKenzie participated in the Mets first Old Timers' Day since 1994, in celebration of the franchise's 60th anniversary. He was one of six players from that inaugural team in attendance.

== Death ==
MacKenzie died at his home in Guilford, Connecticut, on December 14, 2023, at the age of 89.
