= Jay Hook =

American baseball player (born 1936)

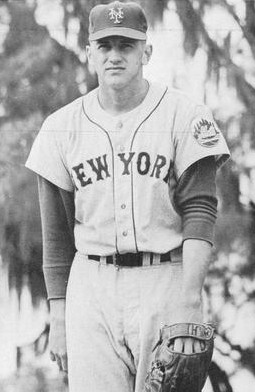
- Pitcher
- Born: November 18, 1936 (age 89); Waukegan, Illinois, U.S.
- Batted: Left Threw: Right

MLB debut
- September 3, 1957, for the Cincinnati Redlegs

Last MLB appearance
- May 3, 1964, for the New York Mets

MLB statistics
- Win–loss record: 29–62
- Earned run average: 5.23
- Strikeouts: 394
- Stats at Baseball Reference

Teams
- Cincinnati Redlegs / Reds (1957–1961); New York Mets (1962–1964)

James Wesley Hook (born November 18, 1936) is an American former starting pitcher in Major League Baseball. From 1957 through 1964, Hook played for the Cincinnati Reds (1957–61) and New York Mets (1962–64). He batted left-handed and threw right-handed.

In an eight-season career, Hook posted a 29–62 won-loss record with 394 strikeouts and a 5.23 earned run average in 752 2/3 innings pitched.

Jay attended high school at Grayslake Community High School (now Grayslake Central High School).

A bonus baby signed by the Cincinnati Reds out of Northwestern University, Hook made his major league debut with Cincinnati in 1957. He joined the Reds regular pitching rotation in 1960 and had an 11–18 mark, including a two-hit shutout against the Milwaukee Braves.

Before the 1962 season, Hook was acquired by the New York Mets in the 1961 MLB Expansion Draft, along with Hobie Landrith, Elio Chacón, Roger Craig, Gil Hodges, Don Zimmer and Gus Bell, among others.

On April 23, 1962, Hook became the first winning pitcher in Mets franchise history, tossing a complete-game, five-hitter in New York's 9–1 win over Pittsburgh at Forbes Field, giving the team its first regular-season victory after nine defeats. In that season he compiled an 8–19 mark for the Mets, and led the team in complete games with 13 and games started with 34.

Those 1962 Mets had a record of 40–120, the most losses for any major league team in a single season until the 2024 Chicago White Sox broke the mark with 121 losses.

The Mets traded Hook, cash, and a minor leaguer named later to the Milwaukee Braves for Roy McMillan on May 8, 1964. The Braves then sent Hook to their minor league team in Denver where he pitched a nine inning no-hitter that he lost in the 10th inning. Towards the end of the 1964 season he was called up to the parent team but did not appear in any games for them.

After receiving a master's degree in thermodynamics, Hook retired in 1964 at age 28 to take a job with the Chrysler Corporation. He then worked in senior management positions at Rockwell International and at Masco, and later became a professor of industrial management at Northwestern University.

As of 2002 Hook and his wife Joan resided in Maple City, Michigan.
