= Frank Thomas (outfielder) =

American baseball player (1929–2023)

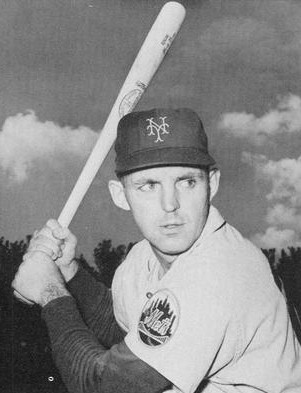
- Outfielder / Third baseman / First baseman
- Born: June 11, 1929; Pittsburgh, Pennsylvania, U.S.
- Died: January 16, 2023 (aged 93); Pittsburgh, Pennsylvania, U.S.
- Batted: Right Threw: Right

MLB debut
- August 17, 1951, for the Pittsburgh Pirates

Last MLB appearance
- May 30, 1966, for the Chicago Cubs

MLB statistics
- Batting average: .266
- Home runs: 286
- Runs batted in: 962
- Stats at Baseball Reference

Teams
- Pittsburgh Pirates (1951–1958); Cincinnati Reds (1959); Chicago Cubs (1960–1961); Milwaukee Braves (1961); New York Mets (1962–1964); Philadelphia Phillies (1964–1965); Houston Astros (1965); Milwaukee Braves (1965); Chicago Cubs (1966)

Career highlights and awards
- 3× All-Star (1954, 1955, 1958)

Frank Joseph Thomas Sr. (June 11, 1929 – January 16, 2023) was an American outfielder and third baseman in Major League Baseball (MLB) who played for seven National League (NL) teams from 1951 to 1966. He was a three-time All-Star.

Beginning his career as a center and left fielder with the Pittsburgh Pirates, Thomas hit 30 home runs with 102 runs batted in (RBIs) in his first full season in 1953 before being named to the All-Star team each of the next two seasons. He had career highs of 35 home runs and 109 RBIs in 1958, and was named the starting third baseman for the All-Star Game. Thomas was traded after that season, however, in the first of four trades in three years. He continued his productivity, hitting at least 20 home runs in all but one season between 1953 and 1962.

After being acquired by the expansion New York Mets, he led the team with 34 home runs and 94 RBIs in their first season in 1962. His hitting declined after that year, and he ended his career playing for five clubs in his last three seasons. By the end of his career, Thomas had played every infield and outfield position except shortstop, and his 163 home runs with the Pirates placed him second in team history at the time behind Ralph Kiner. His 34 home runs with the 1962 Mets remained the team record until 1975, and his 94 RBIs that year were the team's top mark until 1970.

== Early life ==
Thomas was born in Pittsburgh to Bronaslaus Tumas, a Lithuanian immigrant, and Anna Marian Thomas of Johnstown, Pennsylvania. He had three siblings. As a teenager he attended Mount Carmel College seminary in Niagara Falls, Ontario, and he studied for the Roman Catholic priesthood for 4 1/2 years before entering pro baseball.

== Career ==
Thomas signed with the Pittsburgh Pirates as an amateur free agent in 1947. He made his major league debut with the Pirates in 1951. With the Pirates, he made three All-Star Games, and finished fourth in the voting for Most Valuable Player in 1958, when he batted .281, finished second in the National League to Ernie Banks with 35 home runs, and had 109 runs batted in (RBIs). Thomas appeared on the cover of the July 28, 1958, issue of Sports Illustrated. He also won his only NL Player of the Month award in June, batting .275 with nine home runs and 29 RBIs. On August 16, 1958, Thomas hit three home runs in a 13–4 rout of the Cincinnati Reds.

Before the 1959 season, the Pirates traded Thomas, Whammy Douglas, Jim Pendleton, and John Powers to the Cincinnati Redlegs for Smoky Burgess, Harvey Haddix, and Don Hoak. Due to a shattered nerve in the thumb of his right hand, Thomas home run output fell from 35 to 12 in 1959. Following the season, he was traded by the Redlegs to the Chicago Cubs for Bill Henry, Lou Jackson, and Lee Walls. On May 9, 1961, the Cubs traded Thomas to the Milwaukee Braves for Mel Roach.

After the 1961 season, the Braves traded Thomas with a player to be named later (Rick Herrscher) to the New York Mets for a player to be named later (Gus Bell) and $100,000 cash. Despite the team's historically poor inaugural season, Thomas led the expansion Mets with 34 home runs and 94 RBIs. His home run mark was a Mets' team record until broken by Dave Kingman in 1975. On August 7, 1964, the Mets traded Thomas to the Philadelphia Phillies for Wayne Graham, Gary Kroll, and cash.

On July 3, 1965, Thomas got into a fight with Dick Allen, in which he hit Allen with a bat in the shoulder. After that night's game, the Phillies placed Thomas on irrevocable waivers. He was purchased by the Houston Astros from the Phillies on July 10, 1965. While the Phillies prohibited Allen from telling his side of the story, there was no restriction on Thomas, who made it seem that Allen's behavior had gotten Thomas released. The Astros traded Thomas to the Braves for a player to be named later (Mickey Sinnerud) in September 1965.

On April 5, 1966, Thomas was released by the Braves. He signed with the Cubs on May 14, and after recording five plate appearances without a hit, he was released on June 4.

In a 16-season career, Thomas posted a .266 batting average with 286 home runs and 962 RBIs in 1,766 games. He was larger than the average player of his time, and known for his opinionated nature. His nicknames as a player included "The Big Donkey" and "Lurch".

== Personal life and death ==
Thomas and his wife, Dolores Wozniak, were married in 1951 and had eight children before her death in 2012. He had 12 grandchildren and ten great-grandchildren.

Thomas suffered a fall in 2022 which required a hospital stay. Despite the fall, Thomas was well enough to attend the Mets' Old Timers' Day in August 2022.

Thomas died in Pittsburgh on January 16, 2023, at age 93.

== See also ==
- List of Major League Baseball career home run leaders

Awards
Preceded by Willie Mays & Stan Musial	Major League Player of the Month; June 1958	Succeeded by Joey Jay
