= Whammy Douglas =

American baseball player (1935–2014)

- Pitcher
- Born: February 17, 1935; Carrboro, North Carolina, U.S.
- Died: November 16, 2014 (aged 79); Richlands, North Carolina, U.S.
- Batted: Right Threw: Right

MLB debut
- July 29, 1957, for the Pittsburgh Pirates

Last MLB appearance
- September 21, 1957, for the Pittsburgh Pirates

MLB statistics
- Win–loss record: 3–3
- Earned run average: 3.26
- Strikeouts: 28
- Innings pitched: 47
- Stats at Baseball Reference

Teams
- Pittsburgh Pirates (1957)

Charles William "Whammy" Douglas (February 17, 1935 – November 16, 2014) was an American professional baseball player. The right-handed pitcher stood 6 feet 2 inches (1.88 m) tall and weighed 185 pounds (84 kg) during his active career. Douglas was able to forge a professional career despite having lost an eye at age 11. Moreover, his blindness is what gave rise to Douglas's nickname (or at least the most enduring version thereof), (Note: For more than two years before he was first dubbed "Whammy Douglas" (in two stories from July 1954, by Pittsburgh Post-Gazette writer Dan McGibbeny), Douglas was being referred to as William "Wham" Douglas. The fact that this commenced, without comment, the day after his name first appeared in print lends credence to Douglas's later recollection that the nickname, or at least this version thereof, actually dated back to his childhood.) his glass eye giving the appearance of an "evil eye," putting the "whammy" on opposing batters (an apparent allusion to "whammy"-wielding Hammond "Evil Eye" Fleegle, a supporting character in cartoonist Al Capp's syndicated Li'l Abner comic strip).

== Career ==
Although Douglas only played part of one season in Major League Baseball out of his ten-year pro career, he had a measure of success for the 1957 Pittsburgh Pirates, appearing in 11 games (eight as a starting pitcher), and posting a 3.26 earned run average. In 47 innings pitched, he allowed 48 hits and 30 bases on balls, with 28 strikeouts. That season, the pitcher also played a supporting role in what has become a famous instance of umpire-baiting by controversial manager Bobby Bragan, when, on July 31, following a disputed call favoring the visiting Milwaukee Braves, Douglas slipped into the stands to purchase the orange drink with which Bragan then confronted the umpires.

Douglas also was part of a major trade between the Pirates and the Cincinnati Reds in January 1959. Douglas was sent to Cincinnati in a package of players headlined by Pittsburgh slugger Frank Thomas. In return, the Bucs received Smoky Burgess, Harvey Haddix and Don Hoak — and that trio would play integral roles in the Pirates' 1960 world championship season. Douglas never appeared in an MLB game for the Reds. His minor league record of 82–57 (compiled from 1953 to 1961; 1965) included a stellar season with the 1954 Brunswick Pirates of the Class D Georgia–Florida League, in which he won 27 games, lost only six and posted a 2.06 ERA. In the months immediately preceding that season, the winter of 1953–54, Douglas earned extra money playing semi-pro basketball.
