= Larry Foss =

American baseball player (1936–2019)

- Pitcher
- Born: April 18, 1936; Castleton, Kansas, U.S.
- Died: June 15, 2019 (aged 83); Wichita, Kansas, U.S.
- Batted: Right Threw: Right

MLB debut
- September 18, 1961, for the Pittsburgh Pirates

Last MLB appearance
- September 28, 1962, for the New York Mets

MLB statistics
- Win–loss record: 1–2
- Earned run average: 5.33
- Strikeouts: 12
- Stats at Baseball Reference

Teams
- Pittsburgh Pirates (1961); New York Mets (1962)

Larry Curtis Foss (April 18, 1936 – June 15, 2019) was an American professional baseball player and right-handed pitcher who appeared in eight games in Major League Baseball as a member of the 1961 Pittsburgh Pirates and the 1962 New York Mets expansion team. The native of Castleton, Kansas, stood 6 feet 2 inches (1.88 m) tall and weighed 187 pounds (85 kg).

Foss graduated from Wichita West High School and attended Wichita State University. He began his pro career in the Pirates' system in 1955. After spending seven seasons in the minor leagues, he was recalled by Pittsburgh in September 1961 and made his MLB debut on September 18 as the Bucs' starting pitcher against the St. Louis Cardinals at Forbes Field. Over seven full innings, Foss allowed five hits and only one earned run, as the Pirates built an 8–1 lead. But in the eighth, Foss walked future Baseball Hall of Famer Stan Musial and gave up a two-run home run to Gene Oliver and left the game with an 8–3 lead. When Pittsburgh held on to win, 8–6, Foss earned his first (and only) victory in the majors. The losing pitcher was another future Hall of Famer, Bob Gibson, then in his first full big-league season. He then earned a no-decision in his second start on September 24 against the Philadelphia Phillies before sustaining his first MLB defeat five days later against the pennant-bound Cincinnati Reds.

Foss went back to the minors in 1962. After the Mets acquired him from Pittsburgh via waivers on September 6, Foss appeared in five more National League games. He lost his only decision in his only Mets' start — which came on September 18, 1962, the anniversary of his victory over Gibson, and was also by an 8–6 final score. The 1962 Mets compiled a season record of 40–120, setting a post-1900 record for most losses by a Major League team in a single campaign.

In Foss' eight MLB games, including four starts, he posted a 1–2 won–lost mark and a 5.33 earned run average. He permitted 32 hits and 18 walks in 27 career innings pitched, and registered 12 strikeouts. He left baseball after the 1963 minor-league season and died on June 15, 2019.
