= Herb Moford =

American baseball player (1928–2005)

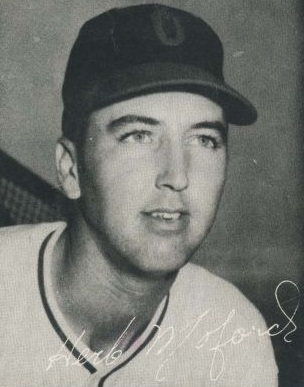
- Pitcher
- Born: August 6, 1928; Brooksville, Kentucky, U.S.
- Died: December 3, 2005 (aged 77); Cincinnati, Ohio, U.S.
- Batted: Right Threw: Right

MLB debut
- April 12, 1955, for the St. Louis Cardinals

Last MLB appearance
- April 29, 1962, for the New York Mets

MLB statistics
- Win–loss record: 5–13
- Earned run average: 5.03
- Strikeouts: 78
- Stats at Baseball Reference

Teams
- St. Louis Cardinals (1955); Detroit Tigers (1958); Boston Red Sox (1959); New York Mets (1962)

Herbert Moford (August 6, 1928 – December 3, 2005) was an American right-handed pitcher in Major League Baseball for the St. Louis Cardinals (1955), Detroit Tigers (1958), Boston Red Sox (1959) and New York Mets (1962). He was born in Brooksville, Kentucky, stood 6 feet 1 inch (1.85 m) tall and weighed 175 pounds (79 kg).

Moford spent each of his four major league seasons with a different team. His most significant year was 1958 with the Detroit Tigers, when he posted a 4–9 record with 58 strikeouts and a 3.61 ERA in 25 games pitched, including six complete games in 11 starts. In 157 1/3 career MLB innings, Moford had a 5–13 record with 78 strikeouts, a 5.03 ERA, and three saves.

On April 11, 1962, Moford was one of four Met pitchers in the first game in franchise history, an 11–4 defeat against the St. Louis Cardinals at Busch Stadium. The other pitchers used by Mets' manager Casey Stengel were Roger Craig (the loser), Bob Moorhead and Clem Labine.

Moford was weak at the plate, posting a .045 batting average (2-for-44) in 50 appearances. He was perfect in the field, handling 44 total chances (8 putouts, 36 assists) without an error for a 1.000 fielding percentage.

He was married to Martha (Beckett) Moford. In May 1977, their daughter, Mindy Moford, was killed in the Beverly Hills Supper Club fire in Southgate, Kentucky. He died in Cincinnati, at the age of 77.

== Sources ==
- Career statistics from MLB · Baseball Reference · Baseball Reference (Minors) · Retrosheet · Baseball Almanac
