= Sammy Drake =

American baseball player (1934–2010)

- Second baseman / Third baseman
- Born: October 7, 1934; Little Rock, Arkansas, U.S.
- Died: January 27, 2010 (aged 75); Los Angeles, California, U.S.
- Batted: Both Threw: Right

MLB debut
- April 17, 1960, for the Chicago Cubs

Last MLB appearance
- September 30, 1962, for the New York Mets

MLB statistics
- Batting average: .153
- Home runs: 0
- Runs batted in: 7
- Stats at Baseball Reference

Teams
- Chicago Cubs (1960–1961); New York Mets (1962)

Samuel Harrison Drake (October 7, 1934 – January 27, 2010) was an American Major League Baseball second and third baseman. He played two seasons with the Chicago Cubs from 1960 to 1961 and one season with the expansion 1962 New York Mets. Sammy and his brother, Solly, were the first two African-American brothers to play in the modern era of baseball. However, his Major League career was shortened by knee injuries. Sammy Drake, like his brother, was a switch hitter who threw right-handed. He was listed as 5 feet 11 inches (1.80 m) tall and 175 pounds (79 kg).

== Early life ==
Samuel was born in Arkansas, and attended Dunbar High School in Little Rock, Arkansas, then Philander Smith College. He tried out for the Kansas City Monarchs, however his brother Solly recommended Samuel to play baseball in Winnipeg, Manitoba, Canada where racism was not much of a factor, unlike the United States.

== Minor League career ==
He was signed by the Cubs organization prior to the 1955 season, after impressing manager Pepper Martin in spring training. Samuel played with the Macon Peaches in the South Atlantic League in 1955, batting .251 in 105 games, while leading the league in stolen bases. He and teammate Ernest Johnson were the first African-Americans to play for Macon, where Drake experienced the racism and Jim Crow laws first hand from the local hometown fans, something he later claimed as a motivation for a further career in Major Leagues. The town African-American population was supportive of the duo, but otherwise Drake nor Johnson were able to stay in the same establishments as their white teammates.

== Major League Baseball ==
Samuel moved up to the Chicago Cubs organization in 1960. He played in 15 games that year, batting .067 in 16 at-bats while scoring five times primary as a pinch runner. Drake participated in another 12 games in 1961, where he was again primarily used as a pitch runner while being held hitless in five at-bats. He was drafted by the expansion New York Mets prior to the 1962 season. He played in only 25 games with the Mets, batting .192 with 10 hits and seven runs batted in in 52 at-bats, before being sent back down to the minor leagues because of recurring knee problems.

In 53 career games, Drake batted .153 with seven runs batted in and eight runs scored.

== Later life ==
When his playing career ended, Samuel became a government employee with the United States Department of Housing and Urban Development and a Sunday school teacher for his brother's church. He died from cancer at age 75 on January 27, 2010, in Los Angeles, California. He was interred at Inglewood Park Cemetery.
