= Ray Daviault =

Canadian baseball player (1934–2020)

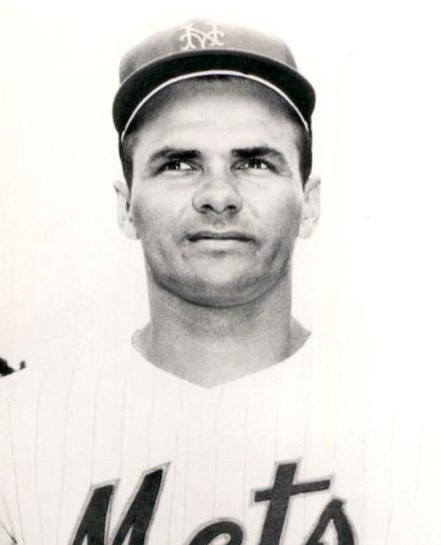
- Pitcher
- Born: May 27, 1934; Montreal, Quebec, Canada
- Died: November 6, 2020 (aged 86); Notre-Dame-de-la-Merci, Quebec, Canada
- Batted: Right Threw: Right

MLB debut
- April 13, 1962, for the New York Mets

Last MLB appearance
- September 30, 1962, for the New York Mets

MLB statistics
- Win–loss record: 1–5
- Earned run average: 6.22
- Strikeouts: 51
- Stats at Baseball Reference

Teams
- New York Mets (1962)

Raymond Joseph Robert Daviault (May 27, 1934 – November 6, 2020) was a Canadian professional baseball player. The right-handed pitcher, a native of Montreal, Quebec, had an 11-season (1953–63) professional career, but spent only part of one season in the Major Leagues, appearing in 36 games (all but three in relief) for the 1962 New York Mets, the first season in that expansion team's history. He stood 6 feet 1 inch (1.85 m) tall and weighed 175 pounds (79 kg).

== Career ==
Daviault had been selected by the Mets with the 18th pick in the 1961 Major League Baseball expansion draft, even though he had yet to pitch a single inning in the Majors. In 1961, his ninth season in the minors, he had appeared in 58 games and 105 innings pitched for the Triple-A Tacoma Giants, fashioning a 10–9 record and an earned run average of 3.17.

In 1962, Daviault broke spring training camp on the Mets' inaugural roster and made his MLB debut on April 13 at the Polo Grounds against the Pittsburgh Pirates — the first regular-season home game in Mets' history. Entering the contest in the eighth inning with the Mets down 3–2, he walked Dick Groat, threw a wild pitch, retired Bob Skinner on a ground ball (with Groat advancing to third base), then uncorked a second wild pitch to score Groat and increase the Pirate lead to 4–2. He also walked three batters in the ninth inning but allowed no further scoring as Pittsburgh ended up winning, 4–3.

Daviault earned his only MLB victory on July 7 against the St. Louis Cardinals, also at the Polo Grounds. He came into a 3–3 tie in the eighth inning and immediately dodged a bullet when Cardinal baserunner Dal Maxvill failed to touch third base and was called out to kill a St. Louis rally. Then, in the ninth, Daviault surrendered a go-ahead home run to the Cardinals' Curt Flood. But, in the bottom of the inning, the Mets' Marv Throneberry hit a two-run, walk-off home run off Ernie Broglio to give New York and Daviault a come-from-behind 5–4 win.

That 1962 Mets team had a record of 40–120, still the modern-era record for most losses by a Major League Baseball team in a single season.

In 36 MLB games and 81 innings pitched, Daviault allowed 92 hits and 48 walks; he struck out 51.

In August 2017, a baseball field was dedicated to Raymond Daviault in Pointe-aux-Trembles. It is now home to the Montreal Brewers of the Ligue de Baseball Majeur du Québec.

== Personal life ==
He was predeceased by his wife, Lisette Lesperance. Daviault had three kids – predeceased by one of them. He had six grandchildren. He died on November 6, 2020. He was 86-years-old. His death was recorded to be in Notre-Dame-de-la-Merci, where he had lived for many years. The obituary in Le Journal de Montréal did not list a cause of death and reported that he had been in good health.
