= John DeMerit =

American baseball player (born 1936)

- Outfielder
- Born: January 8, 1936 (age 90); West Bend, Wisconsin, U.S.
- Batted: Right Threw: Right

MLB debut
- June 18, 1957, for the Milwaukee Braves

Last MLB appearance
- May 20, 1962, for the New York Mets

MLB statistics
- Batting average: .174
- Home runs: 3
- Runs batted in: 7
- Stats at Baseball Reference

Teams
- Milwaukee Braves (1957–1959, 1961); New York Mets (1962)

Career highlights and awards
- World Series champion (1957)

John Stephen DeMerit (born January 8, 1936) is an American former professional baseball player who played as an outfielder for the Milwaukee Braves and the New York Mets. Nicknamed "Thumper", DeMerit threw and batted right-handed and was listed as 6 feet 1 inch (1.85 m) tall and 195 pounds (88 kg).

== Career ==
An alumnus of the University of Wisconsin–Madison, he signed a $100,000 bonus contract with his hometown Braves in 1957. Under the bonus rule then in force, the Braves were required to keep DeMerit on their big-league roster for all of 1957. DeMerit got into 33 games, six as a starting outfielder, but collected only five singles in 34 at bats. Still, Milwaukee won the National League pennant and drew the New York Yankees as their opponents in the 1957 World Series. DeMerit appeared in one contest, as a pinch runner for veteran catcher Del Rice in the eighth inning of Game 3. He failed to score a run and the Braves fell, 12–3. But they outlasted the Yankees in seven games to become world champions.

A change in the bonus rule allowed the Braves to send DeMerit to the minor leagues in 1958, and DeMerit spent most of 1958 and 1959 and all of 1960 in the higher reaches of the Milwaukee farm system. Then in 1961, he spent his only full year in the major leagues. He appeared in only 34 games and hit a poor .162 with 12 hits, but those dozen included his first two MLB home runs, hit off five-time All-Star Larry Jackson April 26 and future Baseball Hall of Famer Sandy Koufax September 15.

The Braves left him unprotected in the 1961 National League expansion draft, where he was selected by the Mets with their tenth pick, 20th overall, in the lottery's regular phase. He made the 1962 Mets early-season roster and appeared in 14 games during the season's first month. On May 15, he singled, walked and hit his third big-league home run (off Dick Ellsworth), scoring the winning run in a 6–5 New York triumph. Such victories were rare, as the Mets won only 40 games all season. The two hits were the last of DeMerit's career: he retired at age 26, rather than report to Triple-A when the Mets attempted to farm him out a few days later.

For his career, DeMerit hit .174 with 23 hits, three doubles, three home runs and seven runs batted in in 93 games played.

Following the death of Felix Mantilla, DeMerit is the last surviving member of the 1957 Milwaukee Braves who appeared in that World Series (Taylor Phillips did not make an appearance in any of the seven games). DeMerit is also the last living MLB player to make an appearance in the World Series for the winning team in any year prior to 1958.
