= Bob Moorhead =

American baseball player (1938-1986)

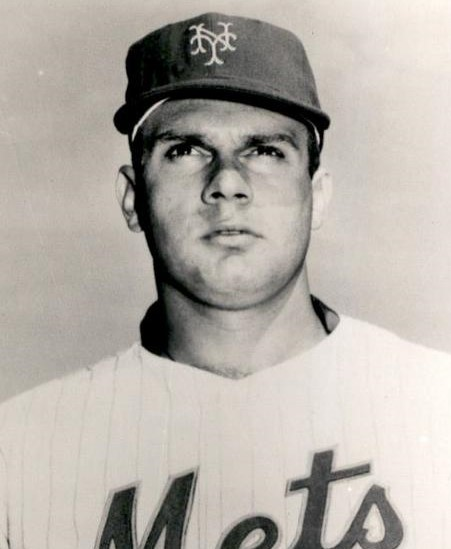
- Pitcher
- Born: January 23, 1938; Chambersburg, Pennsylvania, U.S.
- Died: December 3, 1986 (aged 48); Lemoyne, Pennsylvania, U.S.
- Batted: Right Threw: Right

MLB debut
- April 11, 1962, for the New York Mets

Last MLB appearance
- September 20, 1965, for the New York Mets

MLB statistics
- Win–loss record: 0–3
- Earned run average: 4.51
- Strikeouts: 68
- Stats at Baseball Reference

Teams
- New York Mets (1962, 1965)

Charles Robert Moorhead (January 23, 1938 – December 3, 1986) was an American right-handed pitcher in Major League Baseball who played for the New York Mets in 1962 and 1965.

== Biography ==
Born in Chambersburg, Pennsylvania, and listed as 6 feet 1 inch (1.85 m) tall and 208 pounds (94 kg), Moorhead spent the first five seasons of his professional career in the minor league system of the Cincinnati Reds, and was then selected by the Mets in the 1961 Rule 5 draft.

An original Met, he made his major league debut in the franchise's first official game, played on April 11, 1962 at Busch Stadium. He was one of four pitchers used by manager Casey Stengel in the 11–4 loss to the St. Louis Cardinals. In three innings, he allowed five runs (although only two were earned), on six hits and one base on balls.

In his two-season MLB career, Moorhead posted an 0–3 record in 47 games pitched, with 68 strikeouts and a 4.51 ERA in 1192/3 innings. He permitted 134 hits, 47 bases on balls and 60 earned runs. He retired from baseball in 1966 and died in Lemoyne, Pennsylvania, at age 48.
