= Cliff Cook =

American baseball player (born 1936)

- Third baseman / Outfielder
- Born: August 20, 1936 (age 89); Dallas, Texas, U.S.
- Batted: Right Threw: Right

MLB debut
- September 9, 1959, for the Cincinnati Reds

Last MLB appearance
- July 10, 1963, for the New York Mets

MLB statistics
- Batting average: .201
- Home runs: 7
- Runs batted in: 35
- Stats at Baseball Reference

Teams
- Cincinnati Reds (1959–1962); New York Mets (1962–1963)

Raymond Clifford Cook (born August 20, 1936) is an American former professional baseball player who appeared in 163 games played over parts of five Major League Baseball seasons. Primarily a third baseman, though he played some games as an outfielder during his career, Cook stood 6 feet (1.8 m) tall, weighed 185 pounds (84 kg), and threw and batted right-handed.

== Career ==
A power hitter in minor league baseball, Cook made his Major League debut in September 1959 with the Cincinnati Reds after he had slugged 32 home runs in the Class A Sally League. In his second and third MLB games, when he played both ends of a doubleheader against the Chicago Cubs on September 10, 1959, at Wrigley Field, Cook had six hits in nine at bats, including a double and a triple, with four runs batted in. He also made two errors in the field. That torrid start at the plate enabled Cook to bat .381 during his nine-game late-season trial.

But for the rest of his MLB career, Cook would have trouble making consistent contact. He hit .208 in 149 at bats in 1960, then spent almost all of 1961 in Triple-A, going hitless in five at bats with the Reds. Early in the 1962 season, on May 7, he was traded to the New York Mets with left-handed pitcher Bob Miller for veteran infielder Don Zimmer.

Cook played in 90 games for the Mets over portions of 1962 and 1963, batting a composite .188 in 218 at bats. Overall, his big-league statistics were 163 games played, 398 at bats, 80 hits, 17 doubles, three triples, seven home runs, 35 RBI, 33 RUNS and a .201 batting average. He hit 195 home runs in the minor leagues, and retired from pro ball after the 1964 season.
