= Ed Bouchee =

American baseball player (1933–2013)

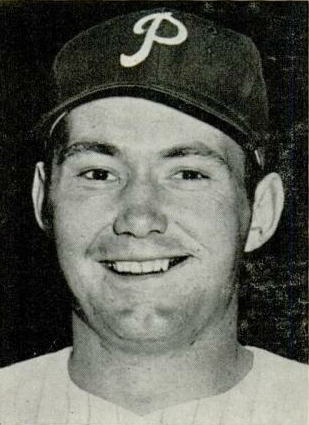
- First baseman
- Born: March 7, 1933; Livingston, Montana, U.S.
- Died: January 23, 2013 (aged 79); Phoenix, Arizona, U.S.
- Batted: Left Threw: Left

MLB debut
- September 19, 1956, for the Philadelphia Phillies

Last MLB appearance
- July 24, 1962, for the New York Mets

MLB statistics
- Batting average: .265
- Home runs: 61
- Runs batted in: 290
- Stats at Baseball Reference

Teams
- Philadelphia Phillies (1956–1960); Chicago Cubs (1960–1961); New York Mets (1962)

Edward Francis Bouchee (March 7, 1933 – January 23, 2013) was an American professional baseball first baseman. He appeared in Major League Baseball (MLB) for three National League (NL) ballclubs – the Philadelphia Phillies, Chicago Cubs, and New York Mets – from 1956 to 1962.

== Early life ==
Born in Livingston, Montana, Bouchee moved with his family to Spokane, Washington during World War II. He attended Lewis and Clark High School in Spokane, where he was an all-state athlete in football, basketball, and baseball. In high school, Bouchee became longtime friends with future big league pitcher Jack Spring.

Bouchee attended Washington State College, where he played college baseball for the Cougars in 1952.

== Baseball career ==
Following the 1957 season, Bouchee was named NL Sporting News Rookie Player of the Year Award and finished second in NL Rookie of the Year voting, owing to his impressive .293 batting average, with 17 home runs, and 76 runs batted in (RBIs). Those would all prove to be career single-season highs for Bouchee. On April 24, 1957, his bases-loaded triple against Bob Friend of the Pittsburgh Pirates allowed pinch runner John Kennedy, the first black player in Phillies' history, to score his only major league run.

On January 17, 1958, Spokane police arrested Bouchee for exposing himself to several young girls. He pleaded guilty to a series of charges, including indecent exposure. Bouchee was sentenced to three years of probation, spent a few months in a psychiatric institution in Connecticut, and then was allowed to return to the Phillies on July 1, 1958. It is for this reason that what would have been his 1958 Topps card (#145) was not issued.

Bouchee was drafted by the New York Mets from the Cubs in the 1961 Major League Baseball expansion draft. He retired from professional baseball following the 1963 season, having spent most of his last two years in the minor leagues.

== Later life ==
After retiring from baseball at the age of 30, Bouchee moved to Chicago and worked for ACDelco as a warehouse supervisor. He later retired from business, moving to Gilbert, Arizona.

== Death ==
Bouchee died in Phoenix, Arizona, on January 23, 2013. His wife Joanne survived him. One of their four children, Chris Bouchee, played minor league baseball in the Phillies farm system, in 1977–1978.
