= Choo-Choo Coleman =

American baseball player (1937–2016)

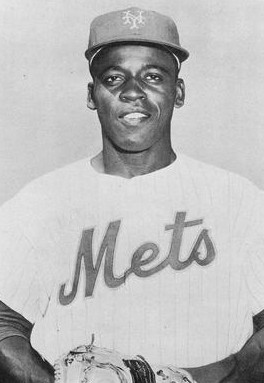
- Coleman in 1963
- Catcher
- Born: August 25, 1937; Orlando, Florida, U.S.
- Died: August 15, 2016 (aged 78); Orangeburg, South Carolina, U.S.
- Batted: Left Threw: Right

MLB debut
- April 16, 1961, for the Philadelphia Phillies

Last MLB appearance
- April 23, 1966, for the New York Mets

MLB statistics
- Batting average: .197
- Home runs: 9
- Runs batted in: 30
- Stats at Baseball Reference

Teams
- Philadelphia Phillies (1961); New York Mets (1962–1963, 1966)

Clarence "Choo-Choo" Coleman (August 25, 1937 – August 15, 2016) was an American professional baseball catcher, who played Major League Baseball (MLB) for the Philadelphia Phillies and New York Mets.

== Career ==
Clarence Coleman was born in Orlando, Florida, on August 25, 1937. He signed as an undrafted free agent with the Washington Senators at age 18. He was released by the Senators and signed by the Los Angeles Dodgers, then taken by the Philadelphia Phillies in the rule V draft. In 1961, he appeared in 34 games for the Phillies, getting hit by a pitch in his first Major League plate appearance. He batted only .128 for the Phillies that year in 47 at bats. The Phillies finished in last place that year, a spot soon to be taken by the expansion New York Mets. In the offseason the Mets selected Coleman in the expansion draft. He played parts of three seasons for the Mets, hitting .205 in 415 at bats.

The authors of The Great American Baseball Card Flipping, Trading and Bubble Gum Book, Brendan C. Boyd & Fred C. Harris, Little Brown & Co, 1973, had this to say about Coleman on p. 37, next to a picture of his baseball card: "Choo-Choo Coleman was the quintessence of the early New York Mets. He was a 5'8", 160-pound catcher who never hit over .250 in the majors, had 9 career home runs, 30 career RBIs, and couldn't handle pitchers. Plus his name was Choo-Choo. What more could you ask for?" Casey Stengel once complimented Coleman's speed, saying that he'd never seen a catcher so fast at retrieving passed balls.

== After baseball ==
Upon retirement, Coleman moved back to his home town of Orlando. After his first wife died, Coleman married into a family who owned a Chinese restaurant in Newport News, Virginia. For over two decades, Coleman helped run the business and occasionally worked as a cook. Coleman eventually retired to Bamberg, South Carolina, where he lived in obscurity until 2012 when he was invited to the Mets 50th anniversary celebration in New York. During the event Coleman both confirmed and denied some of the stories told about him. During an interview, he also revealed that his friends gave him his nickname "Choo Choo" because as a child "I was fast."

Coleman died on August 15, 2016, in Orangeburg, South Carolina, from cancer.
