= 1964 New York Mets season =

1964 New York Mets
- League: National League
- Ballpark: Shea Stadium
- City: New York
- Record: 53–109 (.327)
- League place: 10th
- Owners: Joan Whitney Payson
- General manager: George Weiss
- Manager: Casey Stengel
- Television: WOR-TV
- Radio: WHN (Ralph Kiner, Lindsey Nelson, Bob Murphy)

The New York Mets played their third regular season in 1964. They went 53–109 and finished tenth in the National League, 40 games behind the World Series Champion St. Louis Cardinals. They were managed by Casey Stengel. They played home games at Shea Stadium, which opened on April 17 of that year. This was Stengel's final full season as manager.

== Offseason ==
- October 10, 1963: Jack Fisher was drafted by the Mets from the San Francisco Giants in a 1963 special draft.

== Regular season ==
One high point of Shea Stadium's first season came on Father's Day, when Philadelphia Phillies pitcher Jim Bunning threw a perfect game against the Mets, the first in the National League since 1880. For perhaps the only time in the stadium's history, the Shea faithful found themselves rooting for the visitors, caught up in the rare achievement, and roaring for Bunning on every pitch in the ninth inning. His strikeout of John Stephenson capped the performance.

Another high point was Shea Stadium's hosting of the All-Star Game. Johnny Callison's ninth-inning three-run home run off Dick Radatz capped a four-run rally and gave the National League a 7–4 win over the American League in that game, which evened the series at seventeen wins for each league.

The stadium also saw pitcher Masanori Murakami of the San Francisco Giants become the first Japanese player to appear in the Major Leagues. He entered the game in the ninth inning of the Giants' 4–1 loss to the Mets

Unexpectedly thrust into the spotlight in the final hectic weekend of the 1964 season, the Mets relished the role of spoiler, beating the Cardinals in St. Louis on Friday and Saturday (keeping alive the hopes of the Phillies, Giants, and Reds) before succumbing to the eventual National League champions on Sunday.

=== Season standings ===
National League
Team	W	L	Pct.	GB	Home	Road
St. Louis Cardinals	93	69	.574	—	48‍–‍33	45‍–‍36
Philadelphia Phillies	92	70	.568	1	46‍–‍35	46‍–‍35
Cincinnati Reds	92	70	.568	1	47‍–‍34	45‍–‍36
San Francisco Giants	90	72	.556	3	44‍–‍37	46‍–‍35
Milwaukee Braves	88	74	.543	5	45‍–‍36	43‍–‍38
Pittsburgh Pirates	80	82	.494	13	42‍–‍39	38‍–‍43
Los Angeles Dodgers	80	82	.494	13	41‍–‍40	39‍–‍42
Chicago Cubs	76	86	.469	17	40‍–‍41	36‍–‍45
Houston Colt .45s	66	96	.407	27	41‍–‍40	25‍–‍56
New York Mets	53	109	.327	40	33‍–‍48	20‍–‍61

=== Record vs. opponents ===
1964 National League record Sources:
Team	CHC	CIN	HOU	LAD	MIL	NYM	PHI	PIT	SF	STL
Chicago	—	6–12	11–7	10–8	8–10	11–7	6–12	9–9	9–9	6–12
Cincinnati	12–6	—	12–6	14–4–1	9–9	11–7	9–9	8–10	7–11	10–8
Houston	7–11	6–12	—	7–11	12–6	9–9	5–13	5–13	7–11	8–10
Los Angeles	8–10	4–14–1	11–7	—	8–10	15–3–1	8–10	10–8	6–12	10–8
Milwaukee	10–8	9–9	6–12	10–8	—	14–4	10–8	12–6	9–9	8–10
New York	7–11	7–11	9–9	3–15–1	4–14	—	3–15	6–12	7–11	7–11
Philadelphia	12-6	9–9	13–5	10–8	8–10	15–3	—	10–8	10–8	5–13
Pittsburgh	9–9	10–8	13–5	8–10	6–12	12–6	8–10	—	8–10	6–12
San Francisco	9–9	11–7	11–7	12–6	9–9	11–7	8–10	10–8	—	9–9
St. Louis	12–6	8–10	10–8	8–10	10–8	11–7	13–5	12–6	9–9	—

=== Notable transactions ===
- April 6, 1964: Darrell Sutherland was selected off waivers by the Mets from the Philadelphia Phillies as a first-year waiver pick.
- April 23, 1964: Chico Fernández, Bobby Catton (minors), and cash were traded by the Mets to the Chicago White Sox for Charley Smith.
- August 7, 1964: Frank Thomas was traded by the Mets to the Philadelphia Phillies for Wayne Graham, Gary Kroll, and cash.
- August 8, 1964: Frank Lary was traded by the Mets to the Milwaukee Braves for Dennis Ribant and cash.
- August 27, 1964: Jerry Koosman was signed as an amateur free agent by the Mets.

=== Shea Stadium ===
The Mets' new home park was originally to be called "Flushing Meadows Stadium" – the name of the public park on which it was built – but a movement was launched to name it in honor of William A. Shea, the man who brought National League baseball back to New York. After 29 months and $28.5 million, Shea Stadium opened on April 17, 1964, with the Mets losing to the Pittsburgh Pirates, led by Roberto Clemente and Bill Mazeroski, 4–3 before a crowd of 50,312. Shea was a circular stadium, with the grandstand forming a perfect circle around the field and ending a short distance beyond the foul lines. The remainder of the perimeter was mostly empty space beyond the outfield fences. This space was occupied by the bullpens, the scoreboard, and the centerfield "batter's eye" backdrop. The stadium boasted 54 restrooms, 21 escalators and seats for 57,343. It was big, airy, sparkling, with a massive 86' x 175' scoreboard. Also, rather than the standard light towers, Shea had lamps along its upper reaches, like a convoy of semis with their brights on, which gave the field that unique high-wattage glow. Praised for its convenience, even its elegance, Shea was deemed a showplace.

== Roster ==
1964 New York Mets
Roster
Pitchers: 20 Craig Anderson; 38 Ed Bauta; 31 Larry Bearnarth; 26 Galen Cisco; 39 Steve Dillon; 22 Jack Fisher; 24 Jerry Hinsley; 47 Jay Hook; 38 Willard Hunter; 15 Al Jackson; 25 Gary Kroll; 17 Frank Lary; 45 Ron Locke; 27 Tom Parsons; 17 Dennis Ribant; 36 Tracy Stallard; 47 Tom Sturdivant; 43 Darrell Sutherland; 43 Bill Wakefield; 28 Carlton Willey	Catchers: 8 Chris Cannizzaro; 12 Jesse Gonder; 19 Hawk Taylor; Infielders: 6 Larry Burright; 4 Wayne Graham; 3 Tim Harkness; 33 Ron Hunt; 10 Rod Kanehl; 6 Bobby Klaus; 21 Ed Kranepool; 11 Roy McMillan; 40 Al Moran; 7 Amado Samuel; 1 Charley Smith; 16 Dick Smith; 49 John Stephenson	Outfielders: 2 George Altman; 23 Joe Christopher; 42 Larry Elliot; 9 Jim Hickman; 25 Frank Thomas	Manager: 37 Casey Stengel; Coaches: 53 Mel Harder (Pitching); 52 Don Heffner (Third base); 54 Sheriff Robinson (Bullpen); 51 Wes Westrum (First base)

== Player stats ==
= Indicates team leader

=== Batting ===
==== Starters by position ====
Note: Pos = Position; G = Games played; AB = At bats; H = Hits; Avg. = Batting average; HR = Home runs; RBI = Runs batted in

Pos	Player	G	AB	R	H	Avg.	HR	RBI	SB
C	Jesse Gonder	131	341	28	92	.270	7	35	0
1B	Ed Kranepool	119	420	47	108	.257	10	45	0
2B	Ron Hunt	127	475	59	144	.303	6	42	6
3B	Charley Smith	127	443	44	106	.239	20	58	2
SS	Roy McMillan	113	379	30	80	.211	1	25	3
LF	George Altman	124	422	48	97	.230	9	47	4
CF	Jim Hickman	139	409	48	105	.257	11	57	0
RF	Joe Christopher	154	543	78	163	.300	16	76	6

==== Other batters ====
Note: G = Games played; AB = At bats; H = Hits; Avg. = Batting average; HR = Home runs; RBI = Runs batted in

Player	G	AB	R	H	Avg.	HR	RBI	SB
Rod Kanehl	98	254	25	59	.232	1	11	3
Hawk Taylor	92	225	20	54	.240	4	23	0
Larry Elliot	80	224	27	51	.228	9	22	1
Bobby Klaus	56	209	25	51	.244	2	11	3
Frank Thomas	60	197	19	50	.254	3	19	1
Chris Cannizzaro	60	164	11	51	.311	0	10	0
Amado Samuel	53	142	7	33	.232	0	5	0
Tim Harkness	39	117	11	33	.282	2	13	1
Dick Smith	46	94	14	21	.223	0	3	6
John Stephenson	37	57	2	9	.158	1	2	0
Wayne Graham	20	33	1	3	.091	0	0	0
Al Moran	16	22	2	5	.227	0	4	0
Larry Burright	3	7	0	0	.000	0	0	0

=== Pitching ===
==== Starting pitchers ====
Note: G = Games pitched; IP = Innings pitched; W = Wins; L = Losses; ERA = Earned run average; SO = Strikeouts

Player	G	IP	W	L	ERA	SO
Jack Fisher	40	227.2	10	17	4.23	115
Tracy Stallard	36	225.2	10	20	3.79	118
Al Jackson	40	213.1	11	16	4.26	112
Galen Cisco	36	191.2	6	19	3.62	78

==== Other pitchers ====
Note: G = Games pitched; IP = Innings pitched; W = Wins; L = Losses; ERA = Earned run average; SO = Strikeouts

Player	G	IP	W	L	ERA	SO
Dennis Ribant	14	57.2	1	5	5.15	35
Frank Lary	13	57.1	2	3	4.55	27
Carl Willey	14	30.0	0	2	3.60	14
Darrell Sutherland	10	26.2	0	3	7.76	9
Gary Kroll	8	21.2	0	1	4.15	24
Tom Parsons	4	19.1	1	2	4.19	10
Jerry Hinsley	9	15.1	0	2	8.22	11
Craig Anderson	4	13.0	0	1	5.54	5
Jay Hook	3	9.2	0	1	9.31	5

==== Relief pitchers ====
Note: G = Games pitched; W = Wins; L = Losses; SV = Saves; ERA = Earned run average; SO = Strikeouts

Player	G	W	L	SV	ERA	SO
Willard Hunter	41	3	3	5	4.41	22
Bill Wakefield	62	3	5	2	3.61	61
Larry Bearnarth	44	5	5	3	4.15	31
Ron Locke	25	1	2	0	3.48	17
Tom Sturdivant	16	0	0	1	5.97	18
Ed Bauta	8	0	2	1	5.40	3
Steve Dillon	2	0	0	0	0.00	0

== Farm system ==
Level	Team	League	Manager
AAA	Buffalo Bisons	International League	Whitey Kurowski
AA	Williamsport Mets	Eastern League	Ernie White
A	Salinas Mets	California League	Kerby Farrell
A	Auburn Mets	New York–Penn League	Clyde McCullough
Rookie	Cocoa Mets	Cocoa Rookie League	Ken Deal

LEAGUE CHAMPIONS: Auburn
