= 1963 New York Mets season =

1963 New York Mets
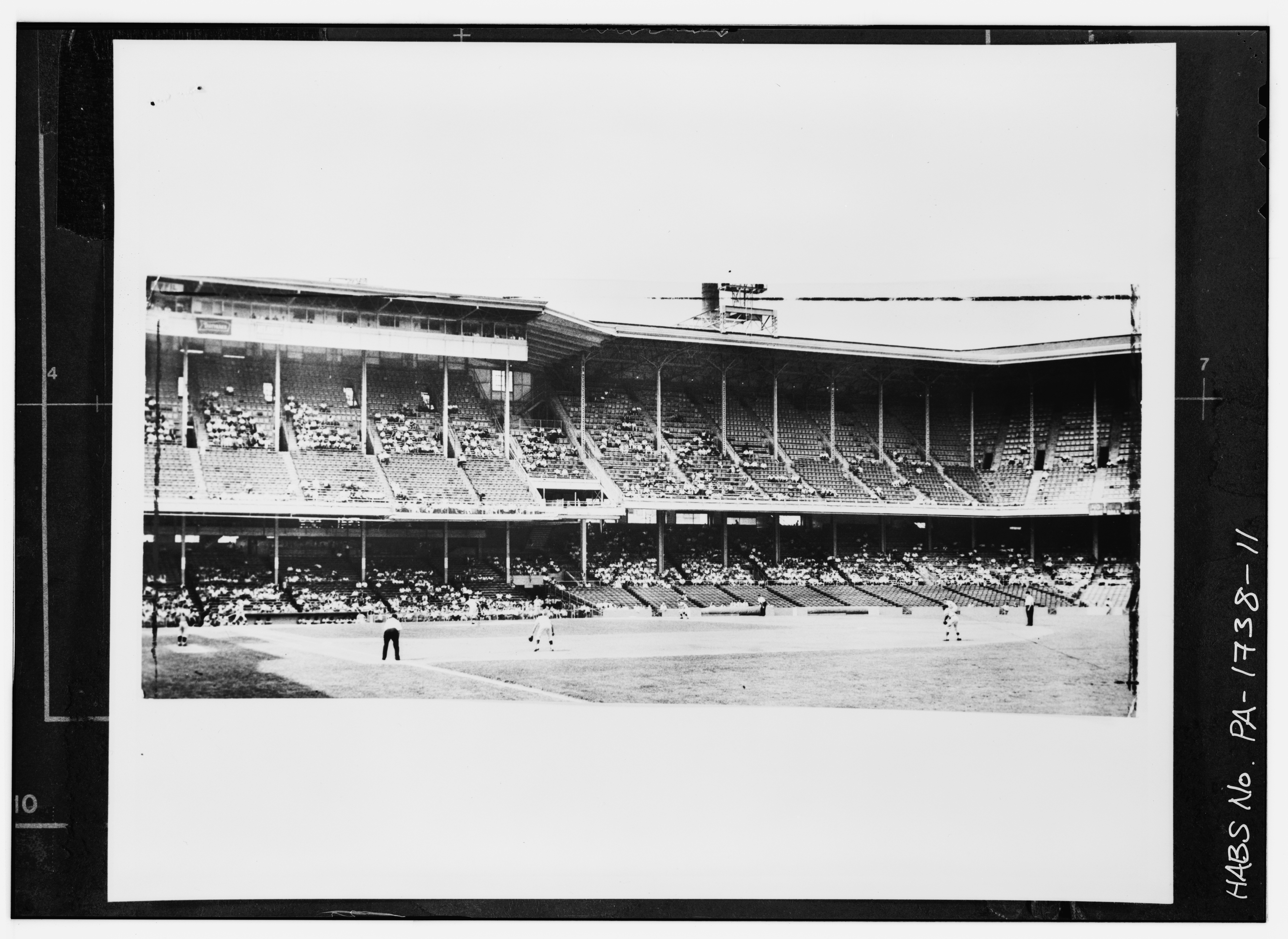
- The Mets playing against the Phillies at Connie Mack Stadium on September 10, 1963.
- League: National League
- Ballpark: Polo Grounds
- City: New York City, New York
- Record: 51–111 (.315)
- League place: 10th
- Owners: Joan Whitney Payson
- General manager: George Weiss
- Manager: Casey Stengel
- Television: WOR-TV
- Radio: WABC (AM) (Ralph Kiner, Lindsey Nelson, Bob Murphy)
- Stats: ESPN.com; Baseball Reference

The 1963 New York Mets season was the second regular season for the Mets. They went 51–111 and finished tenth in the National League, 48 games behind the World Series Champion Los Angeles Dodgers. They were managed by Casey Stengel. They played their home games at the Polo Grounds, the second and final season there for the Mets before moving to Shea Stadium the following season.

== Offseason ==
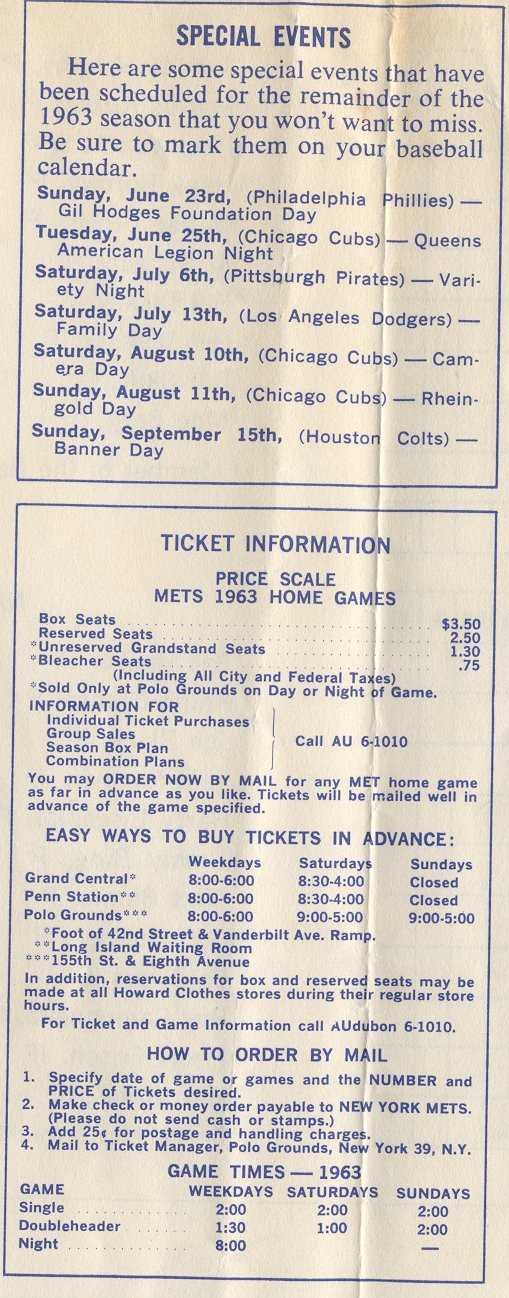
Advertisement for the 1963 Mets' ticket schedule, showing box seats for $3.50 and bleachers for $0.75.

- October 11, 1962: Ron Hunt was purchased by the Mets from the Milwaukee Braves.
- October 14, 1962: Norm Sherry and Dick Smith were purchased by the Mets from the Los Angeles Dodgers.
- November 26, 1962: Paul Blair was drafted from the Mets by the Baltimore Orioles in the 1962 first-year draft.

== Regular season ==
On June 14, Duke Snider of the Mets hit his 400th home run against the Cincinnati Reds. The opposing pitcher was Bob Purkey. The homer came in the 6,783rd at bat of his career. Snider became the ninth player to reach 400 homers. Along with Eddie Mathews, Snider became part of the first duo to reach the 400-plateau in the same season. Afterwards, Mets outfielder Jimmy Piersall told Snider that he could get more publicity for his 100th home run. Nine days later, on June 23, Piersall ran the bases backward after hitting the 100th home run of his career off Philadelphia Phillies pitcher Dallas Green. He was released by the Mets one month later, with that home run being the only one he hit in a Mets uniform.

=== Season standings ===
National League
Team	W	L	Pct.	GB	Home	Road
Los Angeles Dodgers	99	63	.611	—	50‍–‍31	49‍–‍32
St. Louis Cardinals	93	69	.574	6	53‍–‍28	40‍–‍41
San Francisco Giants	88	74	.543	11	50‍–‍31	38‍–‍43
Philadelphia Phillies	87	75	.537	12	45‍–‍36	42‍–‍39
Cincinnati Reds	86	76	.531	13	46‍–‍35	40‍–‍41
Milwaukee Braves	84	78	.519	15	45‍–‍36	39‍–‍42
Chicago Cubs	82	80	.506	17	43‍–‍38	39‍–‍42
Pittsburgh Pirates	74	88	.457	25	42‍–‍39	32‍–‍49
Houston Colt .45s	66	96	.407	33	44‍–‍37	22‍–‍59
New York Mets	51	111	.315	48	34‍–‍47	17‍–‍64

=== Record vs. opponents ===
1963 National League record Sources:
Team	CHC	CIN	HOU	LAD	MIL	NYM	PHI	PIT	SF	STL
Chicago	—	9–9	9–9	7–11	12–6	11–7	9–9	8–10	10–8	7–11
Cincinnati	9–9	—	11–7	8–10	10–8	10–8	8–10	11–7	8–10	11–7
Houston	9–9	7–11	—	5–13	5–13	13–5	8–10	6–12	8–10	5–13
Los Angeles	11–7	10–8	13–5	—	8–10–1	16–2	7–11	13–5	9–9	12–6
Milwaukee	6–12	8–10	13–5	10–8–1	—	12–6	10–8	7–11	10–8	8–10
New York	7–11	8–10	5–13	2–16	6–12	—	8–10	4–14	6–12	5–13
Philadelphia	9–9	10–8	10–8	11–7	8–10	10–8	—	13–5	8–10	8–10
Pittsburgh	10–8	7–11	12–6	5–13	11–7	14–4	5–13	—	5–13	5–13
San Francisco	8–10	10–8	10–8	9–9	8–10	12–6	10–8	13–5	—	8–10
St. Louis	11–7	7–11	13–5	6–12	10–8	13–5	10–8	13–5	10–8	—

=== Notable transactions ===
- May 8, 1963: Larry Foss was traded by the Mets to the Milwaukee Braves for Chico Fernández.
- May 23, 1963: Gil Hodges was traded by the Mets to the Washington Senators for Jimmy Piersall.
- July 1, 1963: Charlie Neal and Sammy Taylor were traded by the Mets to the Cincinnati Reds for Jesse Gonder.
- July 29, 1963: Jacke Davis and cash were traded by the Mets to the St. Louis Cardinals for Duke Carmel.
- July 27, 1963: Jimmy Piersall was released by the Mets.
- September 5, 1963: Ron Swoboda was signed as an amateur free agent by the Mets.

== Roster ==
1963 New York Mets
Roster
Pitchers: 20 Craig Anderson; 19,38 Ed Bauta; 31 Larry Bearnarth; 26 Galen Cisco; 38,13 Roger Craig; 39 Steve Dillon; 47 Jay Hook; 15 Al Jackson; 19 Ken MacKenzie; 41 Grover Powell; 29 Don Rowe; 36 Tracy Stallard; 28 Carl Willey	Catchers: 8 Chris Cannizzaro; 17 Choo-Choo Coleman; 16,12 Jesse Gonder; 5 Norm Sherry; 16 Sammy Taylor; Infielders: 6 Larry Burright; 12,7 Chico Fernández; 18 Pumpsie Green; 3 Tim Harkness; 14 Gil Hodges; 33 Ron Hunt; 40 Al Moran; 4 Charlie Neal; 43 Ted Schreiber; 2 Marv Throneberry	Outfielders: 1 Duke Carmel; 23 Joe Christopher; 1 Cliff Cook; 9 Jim Hickman; 22 Joe Hicks; 34 Cleon Jones; 10 Rod Kanehl; 21 Ed Kranepool; 34 Jimmy Piersall; 16 Dick Smith; 11,4 Duke Snider; 25 Frank Thomas	Manager: 37 Casey Stengel; Coaches: 52 Solly Hemus; 51 Cookie Lavagetto; 54 Clyde McCullough; 53 Ernie White

== Player stats ==
= Indicates team leader

=== Batting ===
==== Starters by position ====
Note: Pos = Position; G = Games played; AB = At bats; H = Hits; Avg. = Batting average; HR = Home runs; RBI = Runs batted in

Pos	Player	G	AB	H	Avg.	HR	RBI
C	Choo-Choo Coleman	106	247	44	.178	3	9
1B	Tim Harkness	123	375	79	.211	10	41
2B	Ron Hunt	143	533	135	.272	10	42
SS	Al Moran	119	331	64	.193	1	23
3B	Charlie Neal	72	253	57	.225	3	18
LF	Frank Thomas	126	420	109	.260	15	60
CF	Jim Hickman	146	494	113	.229	17	51
RF	Duke Snider	129	354	86	.243	14	45

==== Other batters ====
Note: G = Games played; AB = At bats; H = Hits; Avg. = Batting average; HR = Home runs; RBI = Runs batted in

Player	G	AB	H	Avg.	HR	RBI
Ed Kranepool	86	273	57	.209	2	14
Rod Kanehl	109	191	46	.241	1	9
Joe Hicks	56	159	36	.226	5	22
Joe Christopher	64	149	33	.221	1	8
Duke Carmel	47	149	35	.235	3	18
Norm Sherry	63	147	20	.136	2	11
Chico Fernández	58	145	29	.200	1	9
Jesse Gonder	42	126	38	.302	3	15
Jimmy Piersall	40	124	24	.194	1	10
Cliff Cook	50	106	15	.142	2	8
Larry Burright	41	100	22	.220	0	3
Pumpsie Green	17	54	15	.278	1	5
Ted Schreiber	39	50	8	.160	0	2
Dick Smith	20	42	10	.238	0	3
Sammy Taylor	22	35	9	.257	0	6
Chris Cannizzaro	16	33	8	.242	0	4
Gil Hodges	11	22	5	.227	0	3
Cleon Jones	6	15	2	.133	0	1
Marv Throneberry	14	14	2	.143	0	1

=== Pitching ===
= Indicates league leader

==== Starting pitchers ====
Note: G = Games pitched; IP = Innings pitched; W = Wins; L = Losses; ERA = Earned run average; SO = Strikeouts

Player	G	IP	W	L	ERA	SO
Roger Craig	46	236.0	5	22	3.78	108
Al Jackson	37	227.0	13	17	3.96	142
Carl Willey	30	183.0	9	14	3.10	101

==== Other pitchers ====
Note: G = Games pitched; IP = Innings pitched; W = Wins; L = Losses; ERA = Earned run average; SO = Strikeouts

Player	G	IP	W	L	ERA	SO
Galen Cisco	51	155.2	7	15	4.34	81
Tracy Stallard	39	154.2	6	17	4.71	110
Jay Hook	41	152.2	4	14	5.48	89
Grover Powell	20	49.2	1	1	2.72	39
Craig Anderson	3	9.1	0	2	8.68	6

==== Relief pitchers ====
Note: G = Games pitched; W = Wins; L = Losses; SV = Saves; ERA = Earned run average; SO = Strikeouts

Player	G	W	L	SV	ERA	SO
Larry Bearnarth	58	3	8	4	3.42	48
Ken MacKenzie	34	3	1	3	4.97	41
Don Rowe	26	0	0	0	4.28	27
Ed Bauta	9	0	0	0	5.21	13
Steve Dillon	1	0	0	0	10.80	1

== Awards and honors ==
All-Star Game

- Duke Snider, outfield, reserve

== Farm system ==
Level	Team	League	Manager
AAA	Buffalo Bisons	International League	Kerby Farrell
A	Salinas Mets	California League	Ken Deal
A	Raleigh Mets	Carolina League	Clyde McCullough and Tommy Byrne
A	Quincy Jets	Midwest League	Sheriff Robinson and Wally Millies
A	Auburn Mets	New York–Penn League	Dick Cole
