= Tim Harkness =

Canadian baseball player (1937–2025)

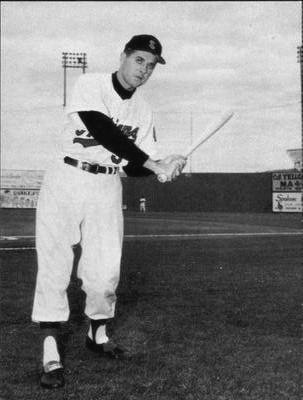
- First baseman
- Born: December 23, 1937; Lachine, Quebec, Canada
- Died: November 30, 2025 (aged 87); Courtice, Ontario, Canada
- Batted: Left Threw: Left

MLB debut
- September 12, 1961, for the Los Angeles Dodgers

Last MLB appearance
- July 28, 1964, for the New York Mets

MLB statistics
- Batting average: .235
- Home runs: 14
- Runs batted in: 61
- Stats at Baseball Reference

Teams
- Los Angeles Dodgers (1961–1962); New York Mets (1963–1964)

Thomas William "Tim" Harkness (December 23, 1937 – November 30, 2025) was a Canadian professional baseball first baseman, who played in Major League Baseball (MLB) from 1961 to 1964 for the Los Angeles Dodgers and New York Mets. The native of Lachine, Quebec, threw and batted left-handed and was listed as 6 feet 2 inches (1.88 m) tall and 182 pounds (83 kg) (13 stone).

== Baseball career ==
Harkness was signed by the Philadelphia Phillies before the 1956 season. He was traded by the Phillies on April 5, 1957, along with a player to be named later, Ron Negray, Elmer Valo, a minor league player, and $75,000 to the Brooklyn Dodgers in exchange for Chico Fernández, with the Phillies completing the trade on April 8 when they sent Ben Flowers to the Dodgers.

=== Los Angeles Dodgers ===
Harkness made his Major League Baseball debut on September 12, 1961, against the Phillies, working out a walk in five pitches against pitcher Chris Short as a pinch hitter in the ninth inning in a 19–10 loss at the Los Angeles Memorial Coliseum. He finished the 1961 season with four hits (including two doubles) in eight at bats, for a .500 batting average.

In the 1962 season, he appeared in 92 games for the Dodgers, with nine hits (including two doubles and two home runs) in 62 at bats, and seven runs batted in. He hit the first home run of his career on April 17 in the top of the second inning against Mike McCormick to drive in Daryl Spencer, as part of an 8–7 win over the San Francisco Giants at Candlestick Park.

=== New York Mets ===
Harkness was traded along with Larry Burright from the Dodgers to the New York Mets for Bob Miller on 1 December 1962. In the 1963 season with the Mets, Harkness played in 123 games, achieving 79 hits (including 12 doubles, three triples with 10 home runs) in 375 at bats, for a .211 batting average, together with 41 RBI. His seven times hit by pitch that season tied him for eighth among National League batters.

On April 17, 1964, Harkness led off for the Mets in the bottom of the first inning, collecting a single off Bob Friend in the third inning to become the first Mets player to bat and the first to get a hit in the team's initial game played at the new Shea Stadium as part of a 4–3 loss to the Pittsburgh Pirates. With the 1964 Mets, he appeared in 39 games, getting 33 hits in 117 at-bats (including two doubles, a triple and two home runs) for a .282 batting average, and 13 RBI.

On July 28, 1964, after Harkness went one-for-four as the Mets' first baseman in a 9–0 loss to the Dodgers, he was traded to the Cincinnati Reds for infielder Bobby Klaus and assigned to Triple-A San Diego. He played at the Triple-A level for the rest of his professional career, retiring after the 1966 season at age 28.

=== Career summary and retirement ===
In 259 big-league games played through all or parts of four seasons, Harkness collected 132 hits, with 18 doubles and four triples accompanying his 14 home runs. He batted .235 overall.

== Death ==
Harkness died in Courtice, Ontario on November 30, 2025, at the age of 87.
