= Ted Schreiber =

American baseball player (1938–2022)

- Third baseman/Shortstop
- Born: July 11, 1938; Brooklyn, New York, U.S.
- Died: September 8, 2022 (aged 84); Boynton Beach, Florida, U.S.
- Batted: Right Threw: Right

MLB debut
- April 14, 1963, for the New York Mets

Last MLB appearance
- September 29, 1963, for the New York Mets

MLB statistics
- Batting average: .160
- Home runs: 0
- Runs batted in: 2
- Stats at Baseball Reference

Teams
- New York Mets (1963)

Theodore Henry Schreiber (July 11, 1938 – September 8, 2022) was an American professional baseball player. He played part of one season (1963) in Major League Baseball — largely as a third baseman — with the New York Mets, batting .160 with no extra base hits in 50 at-bats, with two runs batted in. He threw and batted right-handed, stood 5 ft 11 in (1.80 m) tall, and weighed 175 lb (79 kg).

Schreiber graduated from Brooklyn's James Madison High School and St. John's University. In 1959 he signed his first professional contract with the Boston Red Sox, and he played four full seasons in Boston's farm system, culminating as the regular second baseman for the 1962 Seattle Rainiers of the Triple-A Pacific Coast League, where he batted .279 in 147 games. He was selected by the Mets in the Rule 5 draft on November 26, 1962, and spent the 1963 season with New York and its top farm club, the Buffalo Bisons of the International League. On September 18, 1963, Schreiber pinch hit for Larry Bearnarth in the bottom of the ninth inning; the Mets trailed the Philadelphia Phillies, 5–1. Facing left-hander Chris Short, Schreiber bounced into a double play, ending the game. In doing so, he became the last batter in the history of New York's venerable Polo Grounds stadium.

During the 1963 off-season, Schreiber was a temporary teacher with the New York City Board of Education, and had assignments at Montauk Junior H.S. 223 in Brooklyn. After two more seasons in the IL, Schreiber retired after the 1965 campaign. He batted .260 with 36 home runs in 668 minor league games during his career.

Upon leaving baseball, Schreiber became a full-time teacher at a junior high school in Sunset Park, Brooklyn. He retired after 27 years at the school. He died September 8, 2022.
