= Chico Fernández =

Cuban baseball player (1932–2016)

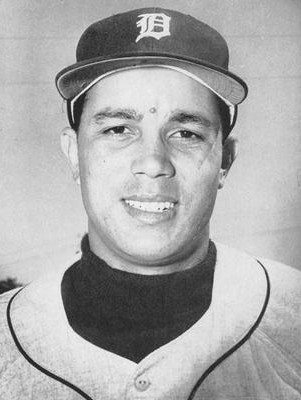
- Shortstop
- Born: March 2, 1932; Havana, Cuba
- Died: June 11, 2016 (aged 84); Sunrise, Florida, U.S.
- Batted: Right Threw: Right

MLB debut
- July 14, 1956, for the Brooklyn Dodgers

Last MLB appearance
- September 29, 1963, for the New York Mets

MLB statistics
- Batting average: .240
- Home runs: 40
- Runs batted in: 258
- Stats at Baseball Reference

Teams
- Brooklyn Dodgers (1956); Philadelphia Phillies (1957–1959); Detroit Tigers (1960–1963); New York Mets (1963); Hanshin Tigers (1965)

Humberto "Chico" Fernández Pérez (March 2, 1932 – June 11, 2016) was a Cuban professional baseball shortstop who played in Major League Baseball (MLB) with the Brooklyn Dodgers, Philadelphia Phillies, Detroit Tigers and New York Mets from 1956 to 1963. Born in Havana, he threw and batted right-handed, stood 6 feet (1.8 m) tall and weighed 165 pounds (75 kg).

Fernández began his career in 1951 as a bright prospect for the Dodgers, reaching the Triple-A level in his third professional season. In 1954, he was the International League's All-Star shortstop, then he batted a career-best .301 in 1955. But he was not able to break into the Dodger lineup, which featured future Baseball Hall of Famer Pee Wee Reese as shortstop and anchor of its infield. After 31/2 years at Triple-A, Fernández finally was recalled to Brooklyn in July 1956. He started at shortstop for ten games between July 14–22 (with Reese, 37, moving to third base), but he batted only .231 with no extra-base hits. The Dodgers, en route to the National League (NL) pennant, went 6–4 over that span, but Reese returned to shortstop on July 24, and Fernández started only five more games through the end of the 1956 season. He did not appear in the 1956 World Series, won by the New York Yankees in seven games.

On April 5, 1957, Fernández was traded to the Phillies in exchange for five players: pitcher Ron Negray, Canadian-born first baseman Tim Harkness, outfielder and pinch hitter Elmer Valo, minor-leaguer Mel Geho, a player to be named later (pitcher Ben Flowers), and $75,000. Fernández made his first appearance with Philadelphia on April 16, 1957, and was the Phillies' regular shortstop for two seasons. In 1957, Fernández collected 131 hits, for a .262 batting average (BA), and a .302 on-base percentage. He also stole 18 bases, fifth best in the National League. In 1958, Fernández stole 12 bases, placing him ninth in the NL. His batting average dropped over the next two seasons, and he saw limited playing time in 1959, hitting .211.

In December 1959, the Phillies traded Fernández to the Detroit Tigers, where he became the Tigers' regular shortstop for the next three seasons (1960–1962). In 1960, he led American League (AL) shortstops, with 34 errors; his fielding percentage was .947. By 1962, he increased his fielding percentage to .960. Perhaps more surprisingly, Fernández displayed power as a hitter, in 1962. After six seasons in which he never hit more than six home runs, Fernández socked 20 homers and tallied 59 runs batted in that season. Both were career highs.

With a young Dick McAuliffe ready to assume the shortstop position for the Tigers, Detroit traded Fernández to the New York Mets in May 1963. He played 58 games for the 1963 Mets. Fernández was then traded to the Chicago White Sox in April 1964, but he never appeared in a regular season game for the ChiSox. In 1965, he played one season in Nippon Professional Baseball (NPB) for the Hanshin Tigers.

Fernández died on June 11, 2016, in Sunrise, Florida, at the age of 84, from complications following a stroke he had suffered the month before.
