= Larry Burright =

American baseball player (1937–2025)

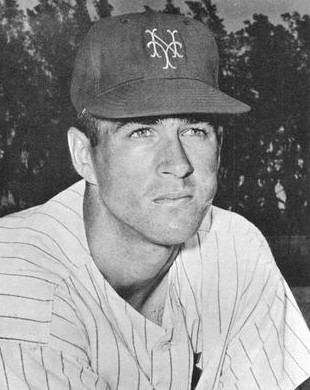
- Second baseman, shortstop
- Born: July 10, 1937; Roseville, Illinois, U.S.
- Died: October 14, 2025 (aged 88); Glendora, California, U.S.
- Batted: Right Threw: Right

MLB debut
- April 12, 1962, for the Los Angeles Dodgers

Last MLB appearance
- April 18, 1964, for the New York Mets

MLB statistics
- Batting average: .205
- Home runs: 4
- Runs scored: 44
- Stats at Baseball Reference

Teams
- Los Angeles Dodgers (1962); New York Mets (1963–1964)

Larry Allen Burright (July 10, 1937 – October 14, 2025) was an American professional baseball player. A utility middle infielder, he appeared in 159 games in Major League Baseball between 1962 and 1964 for the Los Angeles Dodgers and New York Mets. Burright threw and batted right-handed was listed as 5 feet 11 inches (1.80 m) tall and 170 pounds (77 kg).

== Biography ==
Born in Roseville, Illinois, Burright and his family eventually moved to Alhambra, California. He graduated from Mark Keppel High School and attended Fullerton College. In 1957, he signed with the Dodgers (then still in Brooklyn), and played five full seasons in their minor league organization.

In 1961, he hit .291 in Double-A and was called up to the major league club in 1962. Burright started 69 games at second base for the 1962 Dodgers, essentially playing the position when the versatile Jim Gilliam moved over to third base. But Burright batted only .205 in 276 plate appearances and committed a costly error in the ninth inning of the decisive Game 3 of the 1962 National League tie-breaker series, which led to an insurance run in the Dodgers' 6–4 loss to the San Francisco Giants.

Burright was traded along with Tim Harkness from the Dodgers to the Mets for Bob Miller on 1 December 1962. With the Mets in 1963, he hit only .220 in 41 games, eventually losing the regular job to rookie Ron Hunt, and spent much of the campaign with the minor league Buffalo Bisons. The following year, he made the 1964 Mets coming out of spring training, but went hitless in seven early-season at bats and was sent to the minors. He retired from baseball in 1965 at the age of 28 after failing to return to the big leagues.

During his MLB career, he amassed 73 hits, including eight doubles, six triples and four home runs.

Burright died after a brief illness on October 14, 2025, at the age of 88.
