= Jerry Hinsley =

American baseball player (born 1945)

- Pitcher
- Born: April 9, 1945 (age 81); Hugo, Oklahoma, U.S.
- Batted: Right Threw: Right

MLB debut
- April 18, 1964, for the New York Mets

Last MLB appearance
- September 22, 1967, for the New York Mets

MLB statistics
- Win–loss record: 0–2
- Earned run average: 7.08
- Innings: 20 1/3
- Stats at Baseball Reference

Teams
- New York Mets (1964; 1967)

Jerry Dean Hinsley (born April 9, 1945) is an American former professional baseball player, a right-handed pitcher whose career extended from 1963 through 1971. He had two trials in Major League Baseball for the 1964 and 1967 New York Mets. Hinsley stood 5 feet 11 inches (1.80 m) tall and weighed 165 pounds (75 kg), and originally signed with the Pittsburgh Pirates in 1963 out of high school in Las Cruces, New Mexico.

He spent the entire 1963 season on the roster of the Pirates' Rookie-level Appalachian League affiliate but did not appear in any games. He was then selected by the Mets in the Rule 5 draft on December 2. Hinsley began the 1964 season on the Mets' roster and made his debut in professional baseball in the Majors on April 18 against his old organization, the Pirates, in relief. He gave up five hits and two earned runs (coming from a two-run triple by future Hall of Famer Roberto Clemente) in two innings. He made his first start on May 10 against the St. Louis Cardinals at Shea Stadium and lasted 2 2/3 innings, yielding four runs and absorbing his first MLB loss. He appeared in seven more games before being sent to the Triple-A International League for the balance of 1964. Apart from a two-game trial at the end of the 1967 season, Hinsley spent the remainder of his career in minor league baseball. After the 1968 season, he was picked up by the Cleveland Indians in the minor league draft, but he remained in the farm system through 1971.

His Major League totals included 11 games played, with 27 hits and 16 earned runs given up in 20 1/3 innings pitched. He issued 11 bases on balls and struck out 14.
