= Milwaukee Braves Wall of Honor =

Exhibit at American Family Field in Milwaukee, Wisconsin

Coordinates: 43°01′43.8″N 87°58′11.1″W

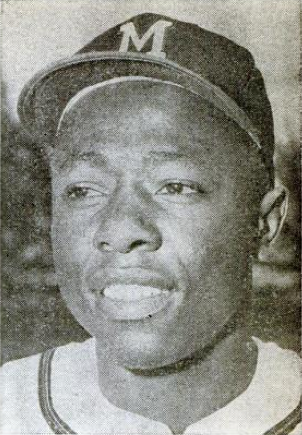
Hank Aaron, also a member of the Baseball Hall of Fame, won the 1957 NL MVP Award and was a 15-time All-Star during his Milwaukee Braves career.

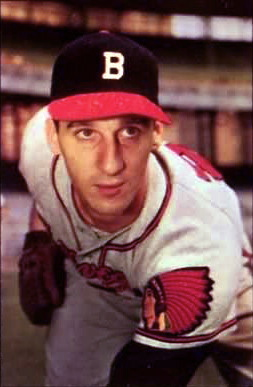
Warren Spahn, also a member of the Baseball Hall of Fame, won the 1957 NL Cy Young Award and was a 12-time All-Star during his Milwaukee Braves career.

The Milwaukee Braves Wall of Honor is an exhibit located at American Family Field in Milwaukee, Wisconsin, that commemorates baseball players who made significant contributions to the Milwaukee Braves Major League Baseball (MLB) team that played in the city from 1953 to 1965. Previously known as the Boston Braves, the National League (NL) team relocated from Boston, Massachusetts, to Milwaukee after the 1952 season. They won the 1957 World Series under manager Fred Haney. After playing 13 seasons at Milwaukee County Stadium, the club moved to Atlanta, Georgia, as the Atlanta Braves after the 1965 season.

The Wall of Honor was established by the Milwaukee Brewers MLB team and the Milwaukee Braves Historical Association in 2004. Each inductee is honored with a bronze plaque bearing their image and a summary of their Braves career, which is affixed to a wall on the third base concourse. As of 2020, nineteen individuals have been inducted.

== Inductees ==
Key
Position	Indicates the inductee's primary position
†	Member of the National Baseball Hall of Fame
‡	Recipient of the Hall of Fame's Ford C. Frick Award

Wall of Honor inductees
Inducted	Name	Position	Career	Ref.
2012	Hank Aaron^{†}	Right fielder	1954–1965	
2011	Joe Adcock	First baseman	1953–1962	
2019	Frank Bolling	Second baseman	1961–1965	
2016	Bill Bruton	Center fielder	1953–1960	
2018	Bob Buhl	Pitcher	1953–1962	
2017	Lew Burdette	Pitcher	1953–1963	
2013	Gene Conley	Pitcher	1954–1958	
2020	Wes Covington	Left fielder	1956–1961	
2012	Del Crandall	Catcher	1953–1963	
2005	Johnny Logan	Shortstop	1953–1961	
2010	Félix Mantilla	Second baseman	1956–1961	
2010	Eddie Mathews^{†}	Third baseman	1953–1965	
2006	Andy Pafko	Right fielder	1953–1959	
2015	Red Schoendienst^{†}	Second baseman	1957–1960	
2004	Warren Spahn^{†}	Pitcher	1953–1964	
2008	Bobby Thomson	Left fielder	1954–1957	
2011	Frank Torre	First baseman	1956–1960	
2014	Joe Torre^{†}	Catcher	1960–1965	
2009	Bob Uecker^{‡}	Catcher	1962–1963	

== See also ==
- American Family Field Walk of Fame
- Milwaukee Brewers Wall of Honor
