= George Weiss (baseball) =

American professional baseball executive (1894-1972)

- Executive
- Born: June 23, 1894; New Haven, Connecticut, U.S.
- Died: August 13, 1972 (aged 78); Greenwich, Connecticut, U.S.

Teams
- As general manager: New York Yankees (1948–1960); As president/general manager: New York Mets (1962–1966)

Career highlights and awards
- 7× World Series champion (1949–1953, 1956, 1958)

Member of the National

Baseball Hall of Fame
- Induction: 1971
- Election method: Veterans Committee

George Martin Weiss (June 23, 1894 – August 13, 1972) was an American professional baseball executive. Elected to the Baseball Hall of Fame in 1971, Weiss was one of the Major Leagues' most successful farm system directors and general managers during his 29-year-long tenure with the New York Yankees.

Working as the head of the Yankees' player-development system from 1932 to 1947, he established it as one of the two best in the game, helping the "Bronx Bombers" win nine American League (AL) pennants and eight World Series championships over 16 seasons. Then, during Weiss' 13 full years as the Yankees' general manager from October 1947 to October 1960, the team won ten AL pennants and seven more World Series titles, compiling a regular-season winning percentage of .622 (1,243–756). He later became the first club president of the New York Mets from 1961 to 1966 after that expansion franchise was formed.

== Early life and career ==
Weiss was born in New Haven, Connecticut, and attended Yale University for a year before dropping out to help run his family's grocery store. In 1915, at age 20, he founded the New Haven MaxFeds in the independent Colonial League, an "outlaw" minor league associated with the Federal League. In 1919, Weiss borrowed $5,000 to acquire the New Haven franchise in the established Class A Eastern League; his team was immediately nicknamed the Weissmen by local baseball writers. He operated the New Haven club, eventually nicknamed the Profs in tribute to Yale, for a decade; it won three league championships between 1920 and 1928. In 1930, Weiss took over the front office of the Baltimore Orioles of the Class AA International League for two seasons.

== New York Yankees ==
=== Farm system director ===
In 1932, at 37, he was hired by Yankees' owner Jacob Ruppert and general manager Ed Barrow to build up the club's farm system, a concept that had been pioneered in the National League by the St. Louis Cardinals and was the linchpin of the Cardinals' dominance of the senior circuit. Weiss grew the Yankee system from four farm teams in 1931 to 16 by 1939; then, after a four-year retrenchment caused by World War II, to 20 by 1947. Headed by the Yanks' longtime top affiliates, the Newark Bears and Kansas City Blues, it churned out many of the players who would lead the Bombers to 15 world championships through 1958, including skeins of four (1936–39) and five (1949–53) straight World Series triumphs. The Weiss farm system produced three Hall of Famers—Yogi Berra, Joe Gordon and Phil Rizzuto (Joe DiMaggio was acquired directly from the independently owned San Francisco Seals of the Pacific Coast League)—as well as longtime stalwarts such as Hank Bauer, Tiny Bonham, Hank Borowy, Bobby Brown, Spud Chandler, Jerry Coleman, Charlie Keller, Johnny Murphy, Joe Page, Vic Raschi and Red Rolfe. The 1937 Bears (third) and 1939 Blues (12th) have been ranked among the top dozen clubs in minor-league history.

Weiss was retained and named a club vice president by the Yankees' new ownership triumvirate, Larry MacPhail, Dan Topping and Del Webb, when they purchased the team in early 1945. He then served under the new owners for three full seasons, as World War II ended and baseball entered a postwar boom.

As both club president and general manager, MacPhail was the dominant figure in the Yankees' postwar hierarchy. On October 6, 1947, hours after the Yankees won the seventh and deciding game of the 1947 World Series, MacPhail—a notorious drinker with a combustible temper—unexpectedly announced his resignation from both front-office posts during the victory festivities. In a drunken state, he confronted several officials at the celebration, including both Weiss and Topping. Weiss was sitting at a banquet table with his wife when MacPhail loudly and abruptly fired him as the Yankees' farm system director. Topping, upon being berated by MacPhail, grabbed him, escorted him to a nearby room, and calmed him down, while Webb, who had witnessed MacPhail's tantrum, assured Weiss he would remain with the team. The outburst ended MacPhail's baseball career. The next day, October 7, Topping and Webb bought out his one-third share in the Yankees, and promoted Weiss to vice president and general manager.

=== General manager ===
Although Topping succeeded MacPhail as club president, for all intents and purposes, Weiss became the operating head of the franchise; Topping and Webb largely left day-to-day operations in Weiss's hands. In his first major trade as general manager, in February 1948, he acquired left-handed pitcher Eddie Lopat from the Chicago White Sox for three players, including former starting catcher Aaron Robinson; Lopat would win 113 games for the Yanks in his 71/2 years in the Bronx. After the 1948 Yankees finished third, Weiss fired manager Bucky Harris and replaced him with veteran former National League skipper Casey Stengel. The 58-year-old Stengel had never produced a first-division team in nine attempts as manager of the Brooklyn Dodgers and Boston Braves. But in the 12 years from 1949 through 1960, the Weiss-Stengel tandem would win ten AL pennants and seven world titles (1949–53; 1956; 1958). Even when their five-season run as world champions ended in 1954, the Yankees won 103 regular-season games (to finish second, by eight lengths, to the Cleveland Indians).

The Yankee farm system produced two more Hall of Famers early in Weiss's GM tenure, Whitey Ford and Mickey Mantle, and continued to contribute key members of their 1950s teams. When it began to falter somewhat in mid-decade, Weiss swung a series of multiplayer trades with second-division teams, first with the Baltimore Orioles and then, frequently, with the Kansas City Athletics, to keep the Bombers at the forefront of their league. These transactions netted the Yankees top players such as Bob Turley, Don Larsen, Bobby Shantz, Art Ditmar, Ryne Duren, Ralph Terry, Clete Boyer and Héctor López. But they also began to struggle in World Series play, losing to Brooklyn in 1955 and the Milwaukee Braves in 1957. In 1959, they won only 79 of 154 games and fell all the way to third, behind the White Sox and Indians. It was the only season during Weiss's time as general manager in which the Bombers failed to win at least 92 games.

He responded by acquiring outfielder Roger Maris from Kansas City in a seven-player transaction in December 1959. A 25-year-old budding star, Maris would win back-to-back American League Most Valuable Player Awards in 1960 and 1961 and, in the latter year, smash 61 home runs in his record-setting chase of Babe Ruth's single-season mark. But by the 1961 season, Weiss was gone from the Yankees' front office. After Maris helped the 1960 club return to the top of the American League standings, they were again defeated in that year's World Series, this time by the Pittsburgh Pirates. In the days following the World Series, both Stengel and Weiss were forced into retirement. A longtime assistant, Roy Hamey, succeeded Weiss as general manager. The Yankees then won four more pennants in succession, along with the 1961 and 1962 World Series.

== New York Mets ==
Weiss and Stengel both ended up with the Mets, set to return National League baseball to New York City in 1962, four seasons after the departure of the Dodgers and New York Giants for California. Weiss was named president and de facto general manager of the Mets in March 1961, and Stengel followed as manager in 1962. In the expansion draft, Weiss selected a roster composed largely of veterans who had played for and against the last New York editions of the Dodgers and Giants, including Gil Hodges, Roger Craig, Don Zimmer, Gus Bell, Ed Bouchee and Hobie Landrith. He supplemented these drafted players by acquiring former Brooklyn stars Duke Snider, Charlie Neal, Clem Labine and Billy Loes, and veterans Richie Ashburn, Frank Thomas, Gene Woodling and ex-Yankee prospect Marv Throneberry—among many others—during 1962 and 1963.

The on-field results were historically poor. The 1962 Mets put up the worst record (40–120) in recent MLB history, and the 1963, 1964 and 1965 teams lost 111, 109 and 112 games. The Met farm system was slow to contribute useful players; by Opening Day 1966, it had yielded Cleon Jones, Ed Kranepool, Tug McGraw, Ron Swoboda and Bud Harrelson, but only Jones and Kranepool saw service before 1965. Weiss also passed on Reggie Jackson in the 1966 Major League Baseball draft, instead selecting Steve Chilcott.

In his five seasons as general manager, the Mets escaped last place in the National League only in Weiss's last year. They compiled a composite record of 260–547 (.322). He retired at age 72 on November 14, 1966, and was succeeded by former Cardinal GM Bing Devine. But despite their poor play, the Mets established a dedicated fan base from their first season in existence, and when they left the dilapidated Polo Grounds for their new home, Shea Stadium, in 1964 they outdrew the pennant-winning Yankees, 1.73 to 1.3 million fans. They would dominate New York baseball attendance until 1976, when their American League rivals moved into a renovated Yankee Stadium and won the pennant.

== Later life and legacy ==
Weiss was named The Sporting News' Executive of the Year in 1950, 1951, 1952, and 1960. In 1971, he was inducted into the Baseball Hall of Fame, one of seven selected for that year's honor. All of the inductees had been selected by the Veterans Committee; no players were elected through the regular voting process of the Baseball Writers' Association of America.

Weiss died in Greenwich, Connecticut, at age 78 in 1972. Stengel lamented his death, saying, "George's death is a tough thing on baseball. He was successful and great and capable in every way, shape and form. He wasn't a terrific mixer but George sure knew how to pick men. Why, you can't stay in baseball that long by pulling players out of an icebox." Yogi Berra said that Weiss could be difficult to deal with, but he praised the emotion that Weiss brought to the game as well as his understanding of the importance of scouting. He was inducted into the New York Mets Hall of Fame in 1982.

With the debut of Elston Howard on April 14, 1955, the Yankees became the sixth of the eight American League teams—and the last of New York City's three big-league clubs—to break the baseball color line. According to the book Yogi Berra: Eternal Yankee, Weiss at a cocktail party stated loudly that "he would never allow a black man to wear a Yankee uniform." The Yankees farm system had in place a policy preventing black players from reaching the major league club, according to the book. Howard, the first African-American Yankee, was switched from an outfielder to a catcher, the position at which it would be least likely to break into the major league club, given Berra's presence.

Conflicting opinions have since been expressed about the reasons behind the Yankees' relative tardiness in integrating their playing roster. In their 2016 book, George Weiss: Architect of the Golden Age Yankees, authors Burton A. and Benita W. Boxerman devote a full chapter to the issue and explore some of the motivations that have been attributed to Weiss, both during and after his career. They write:

Even though the delay in integrating the Yankees was likely a combination of factors including financial success, outstanding performance, unproductive scouts, and possibly the owners' bias against Negroes, it was Weiss, the chief decision-maker in the system, who was held responsible for the lack of a black Yankee. Did deep personal bigotries drive his decisions to delay integrating the Yankees as long as he could? Writers such as Roger Kahn and David Halberstam called him vicious and unable to empathize with any players, especially Negroes. It seemed a much more probable scenario that Weiss's true reason ... was pretty much what he declared when he was asked point-blank why there were no black Yankees: namely, that he was determined to choose a black player who would fit the "Yankee mould."

On a contrary note, Steve Goldman, writing in the SBNation Yankee community Pinstripe Alley in April 2013, said that Weiss:

... clung to the excuse of so many clubs: We're not going to promote just anyone to the majors because they happen to be black; we're holding out for someone special ... By that standard, of course, only the black Babe Ruth or Lou Gehrig was going to get the call.

=== Record as general manager ===
Team	Year	Regular season					Postseason			
Team	Year	Games	Won	Lost	Win %	Finish	Won	Lost	Win %	Result
NYY	1948	154	94	60	.610	3rd in AL	–	–	–	–
NYY	1949	154	97	57	.630	1st in AL	4	1	.800	Won World Series (BKN)
NYY	1950	154	98	56	.636	1st in AL	4	0	1.000	Won World Series (PHI)
NYY	1951	154	98	56	.636	1st in AL	4	2	.667	Won World Series (NYG)
NYY	1952	154	95	59	.617	1st in AL	4	3	.571	Won World Series (BKN)
NYY	1953	154	99	52	.656	1st in AL	4	2	.667	Won World Series (BKN)
NYY	1954	154	103	51	.669	2nd in AL	–	–	–	–
NYY	1955	154	96	58	.623	1st in AL	3	4	.429	Lost World Series (BKN)
NYY	1956	154	97	57	.630	1st in AL	4	3	.571	Won World Series (BKN)
NYY	1957	154	98	56	.636	1st in AL	3	4	.429	Lost World Series (MIL)
NYY	1958	154	92	62	.597	1st in AL	4	3	.571	Won World Series (MIL)
NYY	1959	154	79	75	.513	3rd in AL	–	–	–	–
NYY	1960	154	97	57	.630	1st in AL	3	4	.429	Lost World Series (PIT)
NYY total		2,002	1,243	756	.622		37	26	.587	
NYM	1962	162	40	120	.250	10th in NL	–	–	–	–
NYM	1963	162	51	111	.315	10th in NL	–	–	–	–
NYM	1964	162	53	109	.327	10th in NL	–	–	–	–
NYM	1965	162	50	112	.309	10th in NL	–	–	–	–
NYM	1966	162	66	95	.410	9th in NL	–	–	–	–
NYM total		810	260	549	.321		0	0	–	
Total		2,812	1,503	1,305	.535		37	26	.587	

== Notes ==
- Barra, Allen (2009). Yogi Berra Eternal Yankee. Norton. ISBN 978-039-3-06-2335.
- Perry, Dayn (2010). Reggie Jackson The Life and Thunderous Career of Baseball's Mr. October. HarperCollins. ISBN 978-0-06-156238-9.

Sporting positions
Preceded by Larry MacPhail	New York Yankees General Manager; 1947–1960	Succeeded by Roy Hamey
Preceded by Charles Hurth	New York Mets General Manager; 1961–1966	Succeeded by Bing Devine
Preceded by Franchise established	New York Mets President; 1961–1966	Succeeded by Bing Devine
