= Tracy Stallard =

American baseball player (1937–2017)

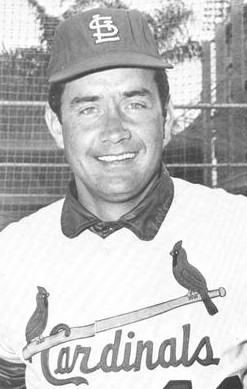
- Pitcher
- Born: August 31, 1937; Coeburn, Virginia, U.S.
- Died: December 6, 2017 (aged 80); Kingsport, Tennessee, U.S.
- Batted: Right Threw: Right

MLB debut
- September 24, 1960, for the Boston Red Sox

Last MLB appearance
- July 24, 1966, for the St. Louis Cardinals

MLB statistics
- Win–loss record: 30–57
- Earned run average: 4.17
- Strikeouts: 477
- Stats at Baseball Reference

Teams
- Boston Red Sox (1960–1962); New York Mets (1963–1964); St. Louis Cardinals (1965–1966)

Evan Tracy Stallard (August 31, 1937 – December 6, 2017) was an American professional baseball player, a Major League Baseball pitcher from 1960 to 1966. He played with the Boston Red Sox, New York Mets and St. Louis Cardinals.

Stallard is most remembered for having given up New York Yankees slugger Roger Maris' 61st home run in 1961.

== Early career ==
Stallard began his professional career in Minor League Baseball with the Lafayette Red Sox of the Class D Midwest League from 1956 to 1957. Over the two seasons, he notched up win–loss records of 5–8 and 7–12, respectively. For the 1958 season, he was promoted to the Raleigh Capitals of the Class B Carolina League, where he posted a 9–6 record and a 3.09 earned run average. 1959 had several stops for Stallard, the first being the Class AAA Minneapolis Millers of the American Association. Stallard threw for a 7–11 record and a 3.51 ERA. He also saw time with the Class A Eastern League Allentown Red Sox, where he posted up a 9–4 record with a dominant 1.68 ERA. During the 1960 season, where Stallard was eventually called up to the major leagues, he posted a 4–5 record with a 4.82 ERA for Allentown.

== Boston Red Sox ==
Stallard appeared in four games in his debut season of 1960. He faced 15 batters without giving up a single hit, and amassed 6 strikeouts. Three of his appearances were against the New York Yankees.

1961 marked Stallard's first full season in Major League Baseball, starting in 14 games and playing in a relief role for 29. Right-handed batters only hit .209 off Stallard for the season. He also had a strong month of May, tallying a 2.70 ERA and 16 strikeouts in 10 innings of relief. On July 16, Stallard was given his first Major League start. In 6 2/3 innings pitched, Stallard gave up one earned run on six hits, but he would get a no decision as Boston reliever Arnold Earley blew a 1–0 lead which eventually led to a 4–3 loss to the Chicago White Sox. Stallard's first victory came on August 10, striking out eight in 8 2/3 innings pitched in a 3–2 victory over the Minnesota Twins. Stallard started in 14 of his last 15 appearances for the season going 2–7 with a 5.00 ERA and 69 strikeouts in 86 1/3 innings pitched as a starter.

=== Roger Maris's 61st home run ===
On October 1, 1961, New York Yankees outfielder Roger Maris hit his 61st home run of the season off Stallard, breaking Babe Ruth's single season record of 60.

The contest between the Red Sox and the Yankees was the final game of the season. Stallard, then 2–6, faced off against Yankees right-hander Bill Stafford (12–9). In the first duel between Maris and Stallard in the first inning, Stallard threw a changeup to Maris that ended up being a soft fly to left field. In the fourth inning, Stallard fell behind 2–0 to Maris. Up to that point, Stallard had said that he was probably having the best game he had ever pitched. Stallard threw a fastball, and Maris hit it over the wall for his 61st home run. It was Maris's only hit off Stallard in seven lifetime at bats.

Stallard felt no shame over the ordeal, saying, "I'm glad he did it off me. Otherwise, I would never have been thought of again. That was about all I did, and I've had a good time with it." There has been speculation that Stallard grooved the pitch in an attempt to help Maris hit the home run, claims which he denied. Stallard struck out five and gave up five hits and just the one earned run in seven innings on the outing, but the Red Sox failed to score in a 1–0 loss, dropping him to a final record of 2–7 for the season.

Stallard appeared in only one game for the Red Sox in 1962, spending the rest of the season with the minor league Class AAA Seattle Rainiers, where he threw for a 7–6 record and a 3.49 ERA.

== New York Mets ==
Stallard resumed full-time major league pitching duty with the young New York Mets in 1963. Boston had shipped him along with Pumpsie Green and Al Moran to the Mets for Felix Mantilla on December 11, 1962.

Stallard again started in the relief role for his first 13 games, but was finally given the opportunity to start on June 2. The game against the Pittsburgh Pirates was his first start since the day Roger Maris hit his 61st home run of the season. Stallard responded to the promotion by notching up a 2.28 ERA with 27 strikeouts in 43 1/3 innings for the entire month of June. Afterwards, though, Stallard's season fell apart. He ended with a record of 6–17 to go with a 4.71 ERA.

Despite improving his ERA in 1964 to 3.79, Stallard still led the MLB with 20 losses to accompany only 10 wins. Even with his abysmal record, Stallard was still tied for 2nd with Jack Fisher for the highest number of wins for the Mets, only one behind Al Jackson (11–16). Stallard also gained the unfortunate distinction, albeit less well-known, as the starting pitcher who lost in Jim Bunning's perfect game on June 21, giving up six earned runs in 5 2/3 innings. In 11 of his games the Mets scored one or no runs. While with the Mets, Stallard developed something of a taste for New York's night life, dating, among others, actress Julie Newmar, who would go on to play Catwoman in the Batman television series.

== St. Louis Cardinals ==
On December 7, 1964, Stallard joined the St. Louis Cardinals in a move that sent him to the Cards in exchange for Johnny Lewis and Gordie Richardson.

Stallard had the best season of his career in his first year with the Cardinals in 1965. After pitching in his first three games as a reliever, Stallard was moved to starter on April 24, and began the season 7–3 with a 2.80 ERA. In May alone, Stallard went 3–0 with a 2.31 ERA in 50 2/3 innings.

Though going only 3–2 from September 1 to the end of the season, Stallard still threw for a 2.41 ERA in 33 2/3 innings over the period. He finished the season 11–8 with a 3.38 ERA. Among Cardinals starters, his win total and ERA were second to future Hall of Famer Bob Gibson, who had 20 wins and a 3.07 ERA.

Stallard appeared as an imposter for country music singer Bill Anderson in the February 15, 1965 episode of To Tell the Truth.

== Late career ==
During the 1966 season, Stallard was very vocal about his displeasure of being assigned to the bullpen, though he had a 6.10 ERA at the time and had just came off three consecutive games where he gave up one or more earned runs in relief. He was promoted back to the starting role on June 4, but it only amounted to a 5.71 ERA in seven starts, averaging only five innings per outing.

Stallard's final start on July 19 against the Atlanta Braves was disastrous, giving up five earned runs in just 3 1/3 innings pitched. The Cardinals fought back to prevail 10–9 in 12 innings, but the damage had been done. He played his final Major League game on July 24 against the Chicago Cubs on the front-end of a doubleheader. He came in to pitch in the bottom of the 6th, and gave up a home run to the first batter he faced, Ron Santo. Stallard pitched into the 7th, but after giving up another run, reliever Joe Hoerner replaced him on the mound.

Soon after Stallard's final appearance, the Cardinals reassigned him to the Class AAA Tulsa Oilers of the Pacific Coast League. From 1967 to 1973, he played for several more minor league teams including the Dallas-Fort Worth Spurs and High Point-Thomasville Hi-Toms, with stops in Torreón and Córdoba of the Class AAA Mexican League.

Stallard took a season off from pitching in 1968, serving as a pitching coach for the Class A Thomasville Hi-Toms under manager Jack McKeon, previously a Minnesota Twins scout and eventual manager of the 2003 World Series champion Florida Marlins and two-time National League Manager of the Year Award winner. Stallard resumed his playing career in 1969 for Thomasville by posting a 3–4 record and a 2.68 ERA.

Despite posting solid earned run averages in three of his final four seasons (2.68, 2.52, 2.35), Stallard never received a call to the Majors again. In his final season, 1973, he posted a 5–11 record with a 2.35 ERA at Córdoba.

Stallard performed well against several Hall of Fame players over the course of his major league career, as Frank Robinson hit .214 (6-for-28) against him, Willie Mays hit .200 (6-for-30) against him, Willie McCovey hit only .152 (5-for-33, though with 3 home runs) against him, and Roberto Clemente hit just .138 (4-for-29) against him. However, Stallard did not have uniformly strong results against well-regarded players, as Hall of Famers Lou Brock and Dick Allen hit .563 (9-for-16) and .351 (13-for-37) respectively against him, and Felipe Alou hit .636 (14-for-22) against him.

== Death ==
Stallard died on December 6, 2017, at the age of 80.
