= Félix Mantilla (baseball) =

Puerto Rican baseball player (1934–2025)

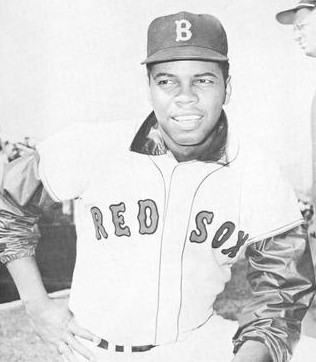
- Mantilla in 1965
- Infielder
- Born: July 29, 1934; Isabela, Puerto Rico
- Died: January 10, 2025 (aged 90); Milwaukee, Wisconsin, U.S.
- Batted: Right Threw: Right

MLB debut
- June 21, 1956, for the Milwaukee Braves

Last MLB appearance
- October 2, 1966, for the Houston Astros

MLB statistics
- Batting average: .261
- Home runs: 89
- Runs batted in: 330
- Stats at Baseball Reference

Teams
- Milwaukee Braves (1956–1961); New York Mets (1962); Boston Red Sox (1963–1965); Houston Astros (1966)

Career highlights and awards
- All-Star (1965); World Series champion (1957)
Medals
Representing Puerto Rico
Amateur World Series
Gold medal – first place	1951 Mexico	Team

Félix "the Cat" Mantilla Lamela (July 29, 1934 – January 10, 2025) was a Puerto Rican professional baseball utility player who appeared mostly as an infielder. In his 11-year Major League Baseball (MLB) career, Mantilla played for the Milwaukee Braves (1956–61), New York Mets (1962), Boston Red Sox (1963–65), and Houston Astros (1966). He played second base the majority of his big league career (326 games) but also shortstop (180), third base (143), outfield (156) and first base (16). He batted and threw right-handed.

In the third game of a three-game playoff, Mantilla unleashed an errant throw that allowed the Los Angeles Dodgers to capture the 1959 National League pennant on the final pitch of the regular season. With the Braves and Dodgers tied at 5-5 in the bottom of the 12th inning, Mantilla fielded a ground ball up the middle but threw low to first base. The ball skipped past first baseman Frank Torre, an error that allowed Gil Hodges to score the decisive run. Mantilla had moved from second base to shortstop in the seventh inning, when Johnny Logan was injured and forced to leave the game.

== Early life ==
Mantilla was born on July 29, 1934, in Isabela, Puerto Rico to Juan Mantilla Vendrell and Natividad Lamela de Mantilla. He began playing organized baseball in Puerto Rico at age 9. In 1951, Mantilla was on the Puerto Rican national team that won the 1951 Amateur World Series, defeating Cuba in the final game 6–5.

== Career ==
=== Puerto Rican baseball ===
Mantilla played professionally in the Puerto Rican Winter League for the Caguas Criollos and the San Juan Senadores. His Caguas teams won a number of Puerto Rico league championships and a Caribbean League World Series Championship. One of his Caguas teammates in 1952 was Hank Aaron. Mantilla was ultimately inducted into the Puerto Rico Sports Hall of Fame, the Caguas Criollos Hall of Fame, and the Sports Hall of Fame in Isabela. Isabela's baseball stadium is named in his honor. Mantilla was nicknamed "El Gato" (the cat) because of his agility.

=== Minor leagues ===
In 1952, Mantilla's Caguas manager, Luis Olmo, sent Mantilla to play at a Boston Braves minor league camp, and he was eventually signed by the Braves. His first minor league season came with the Evansville Braves of the Class-B Illinois-Indiana-Iowa League (Three-I League). In 119 games he had a .323 batting average. He was the Three-I Rookie of the Year and was named to the All-Star team.

In 1953, an 18-year-old Mantilla (along with a 19-year-old Hank Aaron and career minor league outfielder Horace Garner) joined the Class-A Minor League Baseball (MiLB) Jacksonville Braves, of the South Atlantic League (Sally League). They were the first three black players to integrate the team. At that time, Jacksonville was one of the first two integrated baseball teams in the Sally League (along with the Savannah Indians), and one of only a few in the entire Southern United States. Mantilla recalled being booed solely because of his color. Aaron, manager Ben Geraghty, and some of their white teammates helped Mantilla (who did not speak English and had not known segregation in Puerto Rico) navigate his way in difficult circumstances. In Jacksonville's segregated community, Mantilla, Aaron and Garner lived in the home of a local Afro-Puerto Rican businessman. Mantilla and Aaron also were roommates.

The 1953 team had the best record in the Sally League's regular season (93-44), but lost in the league championship to the Columbia Reds in a seven game series. Mantilla played shortstop and had a .278 batting average that year. Aaron was the Sally League MVP, hitting .362, with 22 home runs, 115 runs scored, and 125 runs batted in (RBI). In 1954, Aaron became the MLB Braves’ left fielder when Bobby Thomson broke his ankle.

In 1954-55, Mantilla played Triple-A baseball for the Toledo Sox, principally playing shortstop. In those two years, he played in 129 and 115 games, with .273 and .275 batting averages, respectively. Mantilla began the 1956 season with the Sacramento Solons of the Pacific Coast League, but was called up to the Braves in June. He again played the majority of his games at shortstop, with a career minor league best .957 field percentage, and a .272 batting average. He ended his minor league career with a .286 batting average, 45 home runs, and a .942 fielding percentage at shortstop.

=== Major leagues ===
==== Milwaukee Braves ====
After being called up to the Braves in 1956, Mantilla played in only 35 games, hitting .283 in 53 at bats. He was one of the first Puerto Rican players to reach the major leagues. He played more in 1957, starting 44 games, and playing shortstop, second base, third base and in the outfield. He had a .236 batting average with four home runs. The Braves were National League champions and defeated the New York Yankees 4 games to 3 in the 1957 World Series. Mantilla played in four World Series games, but had no hits in 10 at bats. He started the final two games at second base for an injured Red Schoendienst.

In 1958, he started 52 games, with his most starts in centerfield, while also paying shortstop, second base and third base. He hit .221 with seven home runs. The Braves were again National League champions, but lost to the Yankees 4 games to 3 in the 1958 World Series. Mantilla played in four games without an at-bat.

In 1959, playing winter baseball at Caugus, manager Ben Geraghty realized the Braves would have a need at second base in 1959, due to Schoendienst being seriously ill, so he moved Mantilla to second base. Mantilla started 44 games at second base for the Braves that year along with 23 at shortstop, nine at third base, and seven in the outfield; but he hit only .215 with three home runs in 251 at-bats. After playing in 103 games in 1959, he played in 63 games in 1960 and only 45 games in 1961.

In 2010, Mantilla was inducted into the Milwaukee Braves Wall of Honor at Miller Park. He has been selected to the Wisconsin Old Time Baseball Players Hall of Fame.

==== New York Mets ====
The Braves left Mantilla exposed in the October 1961 expansion draft, and Mantilla was selected by the New York Mets with the 12th pick. In their first year of existence (1962), Mantilla became the Mets regular third baseman (95 games — 88 as a starter). He also started 17 games at shortstop and nine games at second base. He established career statistical highs in batting average, home runs, and RBIs (.275/11/59). His 466 at bats were over 200 more than any season with the Braves. During the December 1962 Winter Meetings, he was traded to the Boston Red Sox for Pumpsie Green, Tracy Stallard, and Al Moran.

==== Boston Red Sox ====
Mantilla's numbers improved dramatically in the hitter-friendly Fenway Park, where he could see pitched balls particularly well. In 1963, his batting average was .315 in 66 games and 178 at bats, with six home runs. The following year he played in 133 games with 425 at bats. Mantilla hit .289 with 30 home runs (five fewer than he had hit in his entire major league career prior to that season). He started 46 games at second base, 42 games in the outfield, while also starting games at second base and shortstop. The Boston Chapter of the Baseball Writers Association selected Mantilla as the Comeback Player of the Year.

1965 was another strong year with the Red Sox. He had career-highs in games played (150), plate appearances (629), and at bats (534). He hit .275, with 18 home runs and a career-high 92 RBIs. He started 120 games at second base and 26 in the outfield. That season, he was also named to the American League (AL) All-Star team for the only time in his career, and was 29th in MVP voting. As the starting second baseman in the All-Star game, he went hitless in two at-bats before being replaced by Bobby Richardson.

==== Final years ====
Prior to the start of the 1966 season, the Red Sox traded Mantilla to the Houston Astros for Eddie Kasko, after Mantilla hurt his arm in spring training. Mantilla spent that year as a utility player before being released on November 28, 1966. He only played in 77 games for the Astros, starting in only 33, chiefly at first base, third base, and second base. He hit .219 with six home runs in only 151 at bats.

The Chicago Cubs signed Mantilla as a free agent before the start of the 1967 season; however, during spring training he suffered an Achilles tendon injury that required surgery. Mantilla never played a game for them and was released on July 6. He went to spring training with the Cubs in 1968 as a non-roster player; at the end of camp the Cubs signed him to a minor league contract, but he never appeared in another professional game.

==== Harvey Haddix's near perfect game ====
On May 26, 1959, in the 13th inning of a game against the Pittsburgh Pirates at Milwaukee County Stadium, Mantilla ruined Harvey Haddix's bid for a perfect game. Leading off the inning, he hit a ground ball to third baseman Don Hoak, whose throw to first pulled Rocky Nelson off the bag for an error. (Mantilla had not even been in the starting lineup; he entered the game in the 11th after Del Rice had pinch-hit for Johnny O'Brien.) Mantilla was sacrificed to second by Eddie Mathews, followed by an intentional walk to Hank Aaron. The following batter, Joe Adcock, hit one over the right-center field wall, just beyond the reach of right fielder Joe Christopher (who was making his Major League debut), for an apparent 3–0 victory. Mantilla scored the winning run, but Aaron, thinking the ball was still in play and that the game ended when Mantilla scored the winning run, rounded second and then headed for the dugout. Adcock, running out his home run, passed Aaron on the bases; as a result, the ruling from National League (NL) president Warren Giles was that Adcock's hit was a double (not a home run), only Mantilla's run counted and the final score was 1–0.

==== Career ====
Looking upon Mantilla‘s major league career stat line, he posted solid numbers, including a lifetime batting average of .261, with 89 home runs, and 330 RBIs.

== Personal life ==
Mantilla was dedicated to promoting youth baseball in Milwaukee, Isabela, and Puerto Rico. Along with Latino leaders in the Milwaukee community, Mantilla created the Félix Mantilla Little League in 1972, which has existed for over 50 years as a cornerstone of youth baseball, and promotes academic development initiatives for underprivileged children. Mantilla was personally involved in working with the children on their baseball skills and qualities necessary to be successful. He also worked to improve youth baseball in Puerto Rico, serving as both a coach and a mentor to young players. In 2017, Cardinal Stritch University awarded Mantilla an Honorary Doctor of Humane Letters degree.

== In popular culture ==
Mantilla's Topps 1962 baseball card was featured in the 2000 film Skipped Parts as the top card in a stack being thrown into a fire as part of a right of passage/growing up event between a stern grandfather (R. Lee Ermey) and his grandson (Bug Hall).

== Death ==
Mantilla died on January 10, 2025, at the age of 90.

== See also ==
- List of Major League Baseball players from Puerto Rico
