= Ron Locke =

American baseball player (1939–2024)

- Pitcher
- Born: April 4, 1939; Wakefield, Rhode Island, U.S.
- Died: December 13, 2024 (aged 85); Richmond, Rhode Island, U.S.
- Batted: Right Threw: Left

MLB debut
- April 23, 1964, for the New York Mets

Last MLB appearance
- October 4, 1964, for the New York Mets

MLB statistics
- Win–loss record: 1–2
- Earned run average: 3.48
- Strikeouts: 17
- Stats at Baseball Reference

Teams
- New York Mets (1964)

Ronald Thomas Locke (April 4, 1939 – December 13, 2024) was an American professional baseball player. A left-handed pitcher listed as 5 feet 11 inches (1.80 m) tall and 168 pounds (76 kg), he appeared in 25 games for the New York Mets of Major League Baseball in 1964, working as a starting pitcher in three and as a relief pitcher in the remainder.

== Biography ==
Locke was born in Wakefield, Rhode Island on April 4, 1939. A star pitcher at South Kingstown High School in Rhode Island, after graduation he went to work at General Dynamics Electric Boat and began playing for its baseball team. After posting an 11–0 record with a 0.25 earned run average (ERA), he attended a tryout with the Auburn Mets and earned a minor league contract.

Having begun his minor league career in 1963, he continued in the minors through 1970, briefly joining the Cincinnati Reds' and Philadelphia Phillies' systems in 1966 before returning to the Mets' organization, where he finished his career. He compiled a minor league record of 62 wins and 48 losses, with a 3.05 ERA. In his rookie season, with the Class A Auburn Mets of the New York–Penn League in 1963, Locke struck out 249 men in 217 innings pitched, and won 18 games.

As a Met in 1964, Locke was credited with the win in one game, the loss in two others, and posted an ERA of 3.48. In 41 1/3 innings pitched, he allowed 46 hits and 22 bases on balls, registering 17 strikeouts. His lone victory came on August 2 against the Houston Colt .45s at Shea Stadium. Given the starting assignment by his manager, Casey Stengel, Locke surrendered five hits and two earned runs over seven innings, and earned credit for the Mets' 4–2 win. Willard Hunter got the save.

A resident of Fort Myers, Florida for 25 years, Locke died in Richmond, Rhode Island, on December 13, 2024, at the age of 85.
