= Larry Elliot =

American baseball player (born 1938)

- Outfielder
- Born: March 5, 1938 (age 88); San Diego, California, U.S.
- Batted: Left Threw: Left

MLB debut
- April 19, 1962, for the Pittsburgh Pirates

Last MLB appearance
- October 2, 1966, for the New York Mets

MLB statistics
- Batting average: .236
- Home runs: 15
- Runs batted in: 56
- Stats at Baseball Reference

Teams
- Pittsburgh Pirates (1962–1963); New York Mets (1964, 1966)

Lawrence Lee Elliot (born March 5, 1938) is an American former professional baseball player. An outfielder, he appeared in 157 Major League games, all but 12 of them for the New York Mets (1964; 1966). The native of San Diego, California, attended Herbert Hoover High School, alma mater of Baseball Hall of Famer Ted Williams; he threw and batted left-handed, stood 6 feet 2 inches (1.88 m) tall and weighed 200 pounds (91 kg).

Elliot was signed by the Pittsburgh Pirates as a 20-year-old out of San Diego City College, and spent four years in the Bucs' farm system before making his Major League debut with Pittsburgh in 1962. As a minor leaguer, Elliot had flashed home run power, hitting 16 homers in both 1958 and 1961, and 25 with the 1959 Wilson Tobs of the Class B Carolina League.

Per the baseball rules then in force, Major League clubs could keep 28 players on their rosters for the first 30 days of the regular season, before cutting down to the 25-man active roster used until September 1. Elliot received the first of his two early-season trials for Pittsburgh in April 1962, and appeared in eight games, including one as the club's starting right fielder, and collecting three hits in ten at bats. In his eighth and final appearance, on May 3, he pinch hit for pitcher Diomedes Olivo and hit a home run off eventual 24-game-winner Jack Sanford of the San Francisco Giants. He then was sent down to the Triple-A Columbus Jets, where he hit 23 more home runs, but batted only .235 in 134 games. He followed a similar pattern in 1963, making the Pirates out of spring training, appearing sparingly (four games as a pinch hitter), and then being sent to Columbus at the cutdown; that season, he hit 26 homers for the Jets. On December 16, 1963, the Pirates sold Elliot's contract to the Mets.

Although Elliot spent part of 1964 with the Triple-A Buffalo Bisons, hitting eight homers in 42 games, he spent most of the campaign in the Majors, getting into 80 games and starting 55 contests in center field in relief of Jim Hickman. On August 11, he gained a measure of revenge against his old team when he doubled and homered, drove in two runs, and led the Mets to a 3–2 victory over the Pirates in a game shortened by rain. Elliot batted only .228 for the Mets, but hit nine homers in 256 at bats. He then played the entire 1965 season in the minor leagues, but the Mets took some of the sting out of the demotion by loaning Elliot to his hometown San Diego Padres of the Pacific Coast League, the Triple-A affiliate of the Cincinnati Reds.

He started 1966 with the Mets' Jacksonville Suns Triple-A club, batted a career-high .303 with 11 home runs in 73 games, and was recalled to New York in July. Elliot continued his hot hitting during his early appearances, with a three-hit game (and four RBI) against the Houston Astros on July 18 pushing his batting average to .348. But, although he started 53 games in corner outfield spots for the Mets through the end of season, his average eventually declined to .246. Elliot began 1967 with Jacksonville; then, on May 10, the Mets traded him to the Kansas City Athletics in what would be a significant trade for them, as they received in return third baseman Ed Charles. Charles became a prominent member of the 1969 "Miracle Mets" and would be identified with the Mets for many years. Elliot played three full seasons (1967–1969) at the Triple-A level before retiring.

In his 157 MLB games, Elliot had 103 hits, including 22 doubles, two triples and 15 home runs.
