= Grover Powell =

American baseball pitcher (1940-1985)

- Pitcher
- Born: October 10, 1940; Sayre, Pennsylvania, U.S.
- Died: May 21, 1985 (aged 44); Raleigh, North Carolina, U.S.
- Batted: Left Threw: Left

MLB debut
- July 13, 1963, for the New York Mets

Last MLB appearance
- September 29, 1963, for the New York Mets

MLB statistics
- Win–loss record: 1–1
- Earned run average: 2.72
- Strikeouts: 39
- Stats at Baseball Reference

Teams
- New York Mets (1963)

Grover David Powell (October 10, 1940 – May 21, 1985) was an American baseball player, a pitcher who appeared in 20 Major League games for the New York Mets in 1963. Born in Sayre, Pennsylvania, he threw and batted left-handed, stood 5 feet 10 inches (1.78 m) tall and weighed 170 pounds (77 kg).

== Early years ==
As a sophomore at the University of Pennsylvania, Powell went 4–0, and led all college pitchers nationwide with 166 strikeouts, still a Penn record. He also hurled a no-hitter against Lafayette College. His behavior, however, led coach Jack McCloskey to kick him off the team. The Mets took a chance, signing Powell before their inaugural season in 1962 regardless of the fact that he hadn't pitched since his sophomore year.

Used as both a starter and relief pitcher in his first professional season with the Auburn Mets and the Syracuse Chiefs, Powell compiled a 4–12 record with a 5.45 Earned run average and 121 strikeouts in 114 innings pitched. Used more strictly as a starter in 1963 with the Raleigh Mets, Powell improved to 5–6 with a far more respectable 3.07 ERA.

== New York Mets ==
The Mets called Powell up in July 1963. With the Mets behind 11–2 to the Los Angeles Dodgers, Powell made his major league debut in the ninth inning on July 13. Though he gave up two walks, Powell escaped his one inning of work without further damage. Despite this modest success, Powell was used strictly in "mop up duty" by Mets Manager Casey Stengel through his first five appearances. In all five cases, the Mets were down a minimum of five runs when Powell was called upon to close out the game.

Powell had a 1.88 ERA and sixteen strikeouts over 131/3 innings pitched when he was given his first opportunity to start on August 20 against the Philadelphia Phillies, who were coming off an eight-game winning streak. Powell and Phillies starter Cal McLish engaged in a pitchers' duel through the first seven innings before the Mets finally broke through for two runs in the eighth and two more in the ninth. Powell allowed four hits and four walks, while striking out six in a complete-game shutout. After escaping a bases loaded jam in the sixth, Powell did not allow another base runner. It would turn out to be his only Major League win.

In his next start on August 27, Powell was holding onto a 1–0 lead over the Pittsburgh Pirates when Donn Clendenon lined a pitch off Powell's cheek. He remained in the game through the end of the inning. Afterwards, he was taken to Presbyterian University Hospital for X-rays. The Pirates would come back to win upon his departure.

His five innings of shutout ball against the Pirates lowered his season ERA to 0.95. From there, Powell pitched to a 5.06 ERA over the remainder of the season. He took his only career loss on September 5 against the St. Louis Cardinals. All told, he went 1–1 with a 2.72 ERA. He struck out 39, allowed 37 hits and 32 bases on balls in 492/3 innings pitched.

== After the majors ==
Powell remained in the Mets' farm system through 1966. Tendinitis limited him to just 42 innings, and cost him the entire 1965 season. He joined the Cincinnati Reds in 1967, and seemed poised to return to the majors. In 1968, he pitched 188 innings, and went 16–6 with a 2.54 ERA for the Southern League's Asheville Tourists. However, he was limited to just 45 innings in 1969. Midway during the 1969 season, he was dealt to the Atlanta Braves for former major league infielder Mike de la Hoz. As a minor leaguer with the Braves, Powell went 1–7 with a 7.60 ERA through the 1970 season before retiring.

Having left school to pitch for the Mets, he returned to the University of Pennsylvania to complete his degree in economics in 1966. In 1985, while visiting his son in the hospital, Powell was diagnosed with leukemia. He died later that year.
