= Darrell Sutherland =

American baseball player (born 1941)

- Pitcher
- Born: November 14, 1941 (age 84); Glendale, California, U.S.
- Batted: Right Threw: Right

MLB debut
- June 28, 1964, for the New York Mets

Last MLB appearance
- April 19, 1968, for the Cleveland Indians

MLB statistics
- Win–loss record: 5–4
- Earned run average: 4.78
- Strikeouts: 50
- Stats at Baseball Reference

Teams
- New York Mets (1964–1966); Cleveland Indians (1968)

Darrell Wayne Sutherland (born November 14, 1941) is an American former professional baseball right-handed pitcher, who played in Major League Baseball (MLB) for the New York Mets and Cleveland Indians, from 1964 to 1966 and 1968.

== Early life ==
Sutherland was born in Glendale, California on November 14, 1941. Sutherland is the brother of MLB infielder Gary Sutherland and son of minor league pitcher Ralph Sutherland. Sutherland was a star at Glendale High School before moving on to Stanford University. Despite being 6 feet 4 inches (1.93 m) tall, Sutherland was relatively lanky, weighing only 169 pounds (77 kg).

== Baseball career ==
Signed by the Philadelphia Phillies on June 12, 1963, Sutherland was selected by the Mets in a first-year waiver pick on April 6, 1964. He made his big league debut on June 28 of that year, facing the Milwaukee Braves. Although Sutherland started the game, he lasted only one-third of an inning, giving up five runs, on three hits, and two walks. In total, Sutherland appeared in 10 games in his rookie season, making four starts. He went 0–3, with a 7.76 earned run average (ERA), walking 12, and striking out only nine in 26 2/3 innings of work.

In 1965, in what turned out to be his career-year, Sutherland was used almost entirely as a reliever. He appeared in 18 games (2 of them starts). Sutherland posted an impressive 3–1 record, with a 2.81 ERA, 17 walks, and only 16 strikeouts, in 48 innings pitched.

In 1966, Sutherland slumped, posting a 4.87 ERA, allowing 60 hits, 25 walks, 23 strikeouts, in 44 1/3 innings. Despite that, he posted a perfect 2–0 record.

Sutherland spent all of 1967 in the minor leagues. On November 28, 1967, he was selected by the Indians in the minor league draft. Sutherland made three appearances for the 1968 Indians, posting an 8.10 ERA, with four walks, and two strikeouts, in 3 1/3 innings of work. Sutherland played his final MLB game on April 19.

Sutherland’s big league career stat line includes going 5–4, in 62 games (six starts), never striking out more in a season than he walked. In 122 1/3 innings pitched, Sutherland walked 58 batters, and struck out only 50. For a pitcher, he was a fairly solid hitter, posting a batting average of .238.

Sutherland apparently made a much better reliever in his career than starter — he won all five of his career games while in relief. all four of Sutherland’s losses came as a starter.
