= Rod Kanehl =

American baseball player (1934-2004)

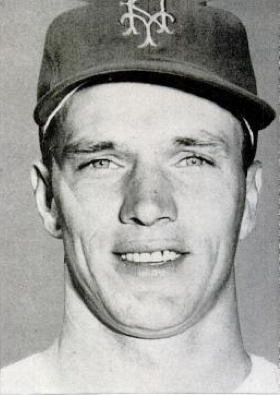
- Kanehl as a rookie in 1962
- Utilityman
- Born: April 1, 1934; Wichita, Kansas, U.S.
- Died: December 14, 2004 (aged 70); Palm Springs, California, U.S.
- Batted: Right Threw: Right

MLB debut
- April 15, 1962, for the New York Mets

Last MLB appearance
- October 4, 1964, for the New York Mets

MLB statistics
- Batting average: .241
- Home runs: 6
- Runs batted in: 47
- Stats at Baseball Reference

Teams
- New York Mets (1962–1964)

Roderick Edwin Kanehl (April 1, 1934 – December 14, 2004) was an American professional baseball second baseman and outfielder. He played in Major League Baseball (MLB) for the New York Mets from 1962 to 1964. Beloved by Mets fans, his attitude was exemplary for a team that lost a modern-era record 120 games in its inaugural season. Kanehl hit the first grand slam in Mets history on July 6, 1962, at the Polo Grounds.

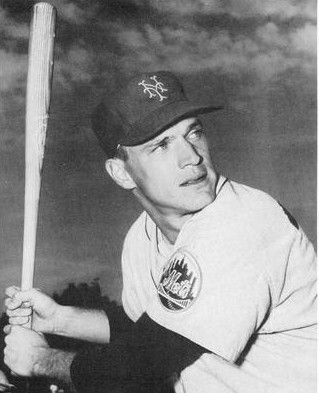
Kanehl in 1963

Before making the major leagues, Kanehl played for eight seasons in the New York Yankees' and Cincinnati Reds' minor league systems. In 1962, at age 28, he was given an opportunity to try out for the Mets' opening season. Through spring training, he worked tirelessly for a spot on the roster. He leaped over an outfield wall in pursuit of a ball and he scored from second on a wild pitch. His attitude and all-out play earned him the nickname ′′Hot Rod′′.

Despite the objections and criticisms of the Mets' general manager George Weiss, manager Casey Stengel stuck with Kanehl. Stengel liked Kanehl's hustle and determination to play the game.

In a three-year career spanning 340 games, Kanehl batted and accrued six home runs, 47 RBI, 103 runs, 23 doubles and 17 stolen bases. A versatile utility man, he played every position except pitcher and catcher.

Kanehl played his final major-league season when Shea Stadium opened its doors in 1964. After the 1964 season, the Mets did not invite Kanehl to spring training, but also prevented him from taking a minor league coaching job he had been offered by the Yankee organization. He worked in construction, sold insurance, and later owned a restaurant. When Stengel died in 1975, Kanehl was the only former Mets player who was present at the funeral.

After suffering a heart attack, Kanehl died at a hospital in Palm Springs, California at age 70.

== Quote ==
- Baseball is a lot like life. The line drives are caught, the squibbles go for base hits. It's an unfair game.
