= Pumpsie Green =

American baseball player (1933–2019)

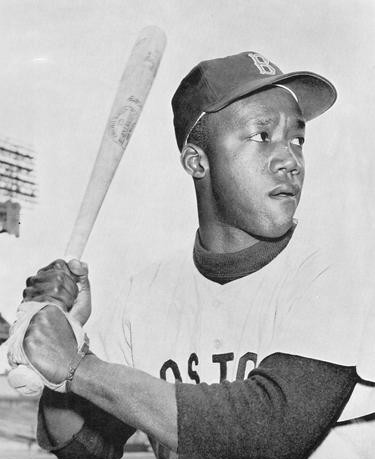
- Green c. 1961
- Infielder
- Born: October 27, 1933; Boley, Oklahoma, U.S.
- Died: July 17, 2019 (aged 85); San Leandro, California, U.S.
- Batted: Switch Threw: Right

MLB debut
- July 21, 1959, for the Boston Red Sox

Last MLB appearance
- September 26, 1963, for the New York Mets

MLB statistics
- Batting average: .246
- Home runs: 13
- Runs batted in: 74
- Stats at Baseball Reference

Teams
- Boston Red Sox (1959–1962); New York Mets (1963)

Elijah Jerry "Pumpsie" Green (October 27, 1933 – July 17, 2019) was an American Major League Baseball (MLB) infielder who played with the Boston Red Sox (1959–62) and New York Mets (1963). A switch-hitter who threw right-handed, he was listed as 6 ft (1.83 m) tall and 175 lb (79 kg).

Green had the distinction of being the first black player to play for the Red Sox, the last pre-expansion major-league club to integrate. In his Boston tenure, he was used mostly as a pinch runner or day-off replacement for infielders Pete Runnels and Don Buddin. Green made his debut on July 21, 1959, pinch-running in a 2–1 loss against the Chicago White Sox.

== Early life ==
Green was born in Boley, Oklahoma, the eldest of five children. One brother, Cornell Green, was a long-time safety for the Dallas Cowboys. Another brother, Credell Green, played football at the University of Washington and was drafted by the Green Bay Packers.

Green was named Elijah, after his father, but his mother called him "Pumpsie" from an early age, although Green relayed that he did not know the origin of the name. Green grew up in Richmond, California, and was a three-sport athlete at El Cerrito High School.

Since major-league baseball had not yet expanded to the West Coast, Green grew up a fan of the Oakland Oaks of the Pacific Coast League. Green later stated that he may have been even better at basketball, but chose to play baseball when he was offered a baseball scholarship at Fresno State University. However, Green decided to attend Contra Costa College when Gene Corr, his high school baseball coach, became the baseball coach there and promised Green he would play shortstop if he attended. In Green's final year of college, he tried out for the Oaks, and was signed to a contract.

== Minor league career ==
In 1954, Green batted .297 in his second season with the Wenatchee Chiefs, an affiliate of the Oaks. In 1955, he was promoted to the Stockton Ports, the Oaks' top affiliate. Green's contract was purchased by the Boston Red Sox during the 1955 season, but he was allowed to finish the season with Stockton before playing the 1956 season with the Albany Senators, a Red Sox affiliate. Green spent the 1957 season with the Oklahoma City Indians and San Francisco Seals, and the 1958 season with the Minneapolis Millers.

In 1959, Green was invited to the Red Sox's major league spring training camp. Despite playing well and receiving much media attention, Green was sent back to Minneapolis. However, after hitting .320 through 98 games, he was promoted to the major league Red Sox.

== Major league career ==
Green made his MLB debut on July 21, 1959, against the Chicago White Sox at Comiskey Park, entering the game in the top of the eighth as a pinch runner for Vic Wertz and playing shortstop in the bottom of the eighth and becoming the Red Sox's first black player. He started the next day at second base, batting second and going 0-for-3. His first MLB hit came in his fourth game, on July 28 in Cleveland when he singled off of Jim Perry. That same day, pitcher Earl Wilson made his MLB debut, becoming the Red Sox' second black player. Green's first at bat at Fenway Park was on August 4 against the Kansas City Athletics; he hit a triple off the Green Monster. Green played 50 games for the 1959 Red Sox, batting .233 and playing second base almost exclusively.

Green enjoyed a much more full-time role in 1960, playing 133 games, 69 at second base, and 41 at shortstop; he batted for a .242 average.

Green may have had his best season in 1961, posting career highs in home runs (6), RBI (27), doubles (12), and stolen bases (4); however, he also had the most errors of his career in 1961, with 16. Despite a hot start to the season, Green developed appendicitis in Washington, D.C. in May, which put him out of the lineup for about four weeks and kept him from playing at full strength for even longer.

In 1962, after a weekend of humiliating losses to the New York Yankees, Green along with Gene Conley got off the bus in the middle of a traffic jam in the Bronx to find a restroom, with the bus driver subsequently driving away without the players on board. Conley was not spotted until three days later by a New York Post sports reporter at the Idlewild International Airport trying to board a plane for Israel, with no passports or luggage.

After the 1962 season, Green was traded to the New York Mets along with Tracy Stallard and Al Moran in exchange for Felix Mantilla. Green played the majority of the 1963 season with the Buffalo Bisons but also played 17 games with the Mets. He played his final major league game with the Mets on September 26, 1963. Green played two more seasons in the minor leagues before retiring after the 1965 season. In a five-season major league career, Green was a .246 hitter with 13 home runs and 74 RBI in 344 games. His 196 career hits also included 31 doubles and 12 triples.

== After baseball ==
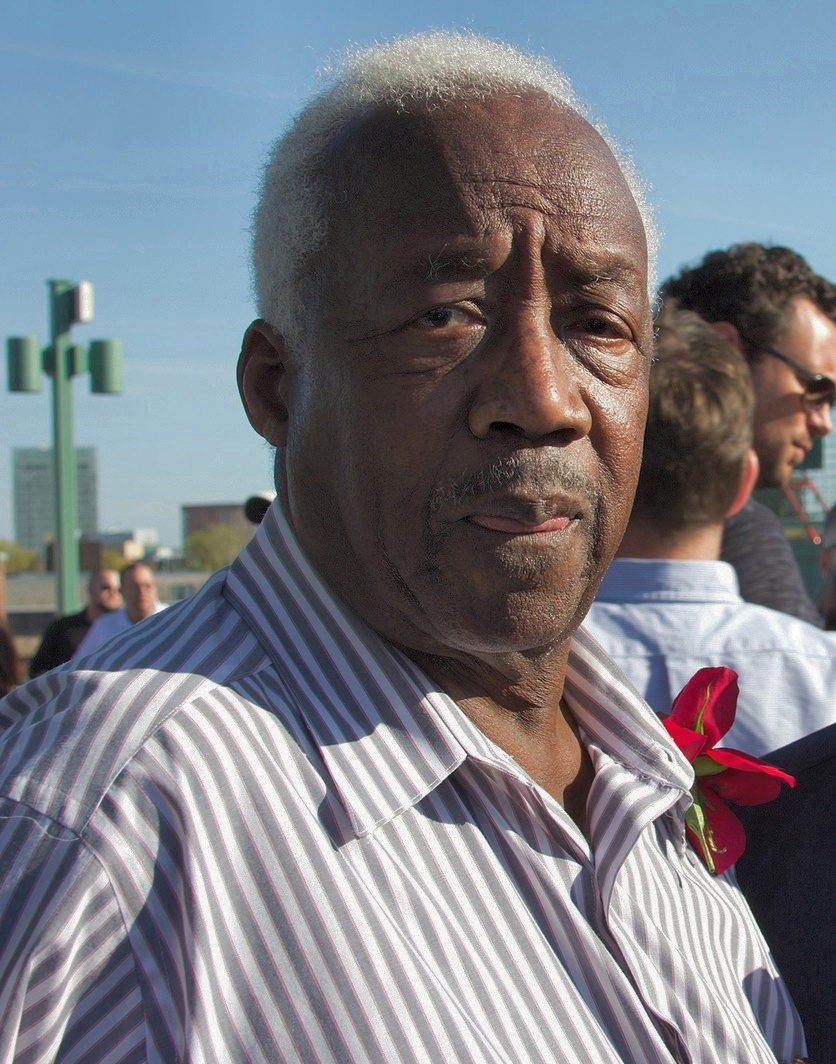
Green in 2012

Following his retirement from playing baseball, Green worked at Berkeley High School in Berkeley, California for over 20 years, serving as a truant officer, coaching baseball and teaching math in summer school. Green lived in El Cerrito, California, since seven years after his retirement from baseball. He was married to Marie for over 50 years.

On April 17, 2009, Green was honored by the Red Sox in a first-pitch ceremony, in recognition of 50 years since his breaking of the Red Sox color barrier. In February 2012, Green was honored by the city of El Cerrito, and presented with a proclamation honoring his "distinguished stature in baseball history." In April 2012, he threw out the ceremonial first pitch before Jackie Robinson day at Fenway Park, and also attended Fenway's 100th anniversary celebrations later that month.

On July 17, 2019, Green died at the age of 85. No cause was given.

== See also ==
- List of first black Major League Baseball players
