= Ed Kranepool =

American baseball player (1944–2024)

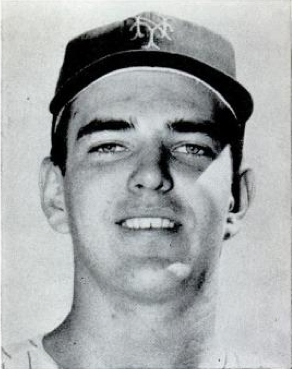
- Kranepool in 1963
- First baseman
- Born: November 8, 1944; New York City, New York, U.S.
- Died: September 8, 2024 (aged 79); Boca Raton, Florida, U.S.
- Batted: Left Threw: Left

MLB debut
- September 22, 1962, for the New York Mets

Last MLB appearance
- September 30, 1979, for the New York Mets

MLB statistics
- Batting average: .261
- Home runs: 118
- Runs batted in: 614
- Stats at Baseball Reference

Teams
- New York Mets (1962–1979)

Career highlights and awards
- All-Star (1965); World Series champion (1969); New York Mets Hall of Fame

Edward Emil Kranepool III (November 8, 1944 – September 8, 2024) was an American professional baseball player. He spent his entire Major League Baseball career with the New York Mets. He was predominantly a first baseman, but he also played in the outfield.

Born in the Castle Hill section of the Bronx, New York, Kranepool attended James Monroe High School, where he began playing baseball and basketball. Mets' scout Bubber Jonnard signed Kranepool in 1962 at the age of 17 as an amateur free agent. By the time he retired in 1979, he had become the last remaining Met from their inaugural 1962 season and was a member of the Miracle Mets World Championship team of 1969.

== Baseball career ==
=== 1962–1963: Debut with the Mets ===
After batting a combined .301 at three levels of the Mets' minor league system in 1962, Kranepool received a September call-up in just his first professional season. At age 17, Kranepool was six years younger than the next-youngest '62 Met, a reflection of the decision of Met management to select mostly older veterans in the expansion draft. He made his major league debut wearing number 21 on September 22, 1962, as a late inning defensive replacement for Gil Hodges at first base in a 9–2 loss to the Chicago Cubs at the Polo Grounds. He grounded out to Cubs second baseman Ken Hubbs in his only at bat. He made his first start the next day, September 23, playing first base, and went one for four with a double.

Kranepool began the 1963 season splitting playing time with "Marvelous" Marv Throneberry at first base and Duke Snider in right field. By May 5, Throneberry's ineptitude at the plate (.143 batting average and only one run batted in during the first 23 games of the season) wore thin on Met fans and management, and he was demoted to the Mets' Triple A affiliate, the Buffalo Bisons. Tim Harkness was awarded the first base job, with Snider shifting to left field and Kranepool becoming the Mets' everyday right fielder. This arrangement, however, did not last, as Kranepool was sent down to the minors in July with a .190 batting average. He resurfaced later that season as a September call-up, and went four for five with a run batted in and a run scored in his first game back. He continued to hit better following his late season call-up, and managed to bring his batting average up to .209 for the season.

=== 1964: Earning the first base job ===
With Harkness, Dick Smith, and Frank Thomas sharing first base, Kranepool received most of his playing time in right field at the start of the 1964 season. On May 24, Joe Christopher was batting .303 and had won a starting job in right field. He was awarded the right field job, and Kranepool was demoted to Buffalo with a .139 batting average.

Kranepool played just 15 games with the Bisons, hitting three home runs and batting .352 to earn a promotion back to the Mets. On his last day with the Bisons, Kranepool played all 18 innings of a double header, before getting the call to come to Shea Stadium where the Mets were playing two games the next day. On Sunday, May 31, he played first base in game one of the double header against the San Francisco Giants. Kranepool also played first in the second game of the double header, which went 23 innings. Kranepool ended up playing all 23 innings, going four for 14 over the two games. In all, he played 50 innings in two days. "I wish we could have played another 40 minutes", Kranepool was later quoted as saying of the record setting double header that lasted nearly 10 hours and ended at 11:20 PM. "That way, I could always say I played in a game that started in May and ended in June."

These two games were the start of a 13-game hitting streak that saw Kranepool's batting average rise to .264. For the season, Kranepool batted .257 with 10 home runs and 45 RBI.

=== 1965–1966: All-Star ===
Prior to the start of the 1965 season, the Mets acquired future Hall of fame pitcher Warren Spahn from the Milwaukee Braves. Kranepool gave up his number 21 to Spahn, who had worn that number his entire career, and began wearing his more familiar number 7.

By midseason, Kranepool was batting .287 with seven home runs and 37 RBIs. He was named the Mets sole representative on the National League All-Star team at the 1965 Major League Baseball All-Star Game, though he did not play. By the end of the season, Kranepool's batting average had fallen to .253, but that was still enough to lead the Mets, as the team lost 112 games that season and finished in tenth and last place in the National League. He also led his team with 133 hits and 24 doubles.

In 1966, Kranepool paced the Mets with a career high 16 home runs to help the Mets avoid a last place finish and 100 losses for the first time in franchise history (95).

=== 1969: Miracle Mets ===
Kranepool was reportedly part of proposed a trade package along with Amos Otis and Bob Heise when the Mets attempted to acquire the Braves' Joe Torre who went to the St. Louis Cardinals for Orlando Cepeda instead.

On May 21, 1969, the Mets won their third game in a row for a .500 winning percentage 36 games into the season for the first time in franchise history. This was followed by a five-game losing streak that saw the Mets fall into fourth place in the newly aligned National League East.

The Mets then went on an 11-game winning streak that included a two home run performance by Kranepool against the Los Angeles Dodgers. By the end of the streak, the Mets were in second place, seven games back of the Chicago Cubs.

On July 8, Kranepool hit a fifth-inning home run off Ferguson Jenkins to give the Mets a 1–0 lead over the Cubs. By the time the Mets batted in the ninth inning, however, the first place Cubs had taken a 3–1 lead. The Mets scored three runs in the ninth to win the game, with Cleon Jones scoring the last run on Kranepool's single to center.

The Mets completed their remarkable "Miracle" 1969 season, in which the team, backed by Kranepool, Tom Seaver, and Jerry Koosman, won their first World Series title against the Baltimore Orioles. Kranepool hit a home run in game three of the series, a 5–0 win for the Mets.

=== 1970–1973: Demoted to Tidewater ===
Period	BA	OBP	SLG	OPS
Through 1970	.246	.298	.358	.656
After 1970	.278	.333	.398	.732

On June 23, 1970, Kranepool was batting just .118, and was demoted to the Mets' triple A affiliate, the Tidewater Tides. He considered retirement, but instead, he accepted his reassignment, and batted .310 in 47 games at Tidewater. He was back with the Mets by the middle of August, but saw very little playing time. For the season, Kranepool had only 52 plate appearances in 43 games.

Kranepool bounced back with perhaps his best season in 1971, batting .280 with 14 home runs, 58 RBI, and an on-base plus slugging+ of 123. He also led the National League with a .998 fielding percentage. The late-career demotion marked a turning point for Kranepool, with him becoming a useful hitter and first baseman/outfielder despite never entering a season with a specific full-time role.

In 1973, Kranepool lost his starting job at first base to John Milner. Kranepool still managed to play 100 games and make 320 plate appearances backing up Milner at first and Cleon Jones in left. The Mets won the NL East, and faced the Cincinnati Reds in the 1973 National League Championship Series. Kranepool's only appearance in the NLCS was in game five, and he drove in the first two runs of the Mets' series clinching victory to lead his team to the 1973 World Series. He played in 4 games of the 1973 World Series, going hitless in 3 at bats.

=== 1974–1976: Joan Payson's death ===
Kranepool batted .300 in consecutive seasons in 1974 and 1975, sharing first base duties with Milner and Dave Kingman. When Mets owner Joan Payson died on October 4, 1975, she left the team to her husband Charles. While Joan had been the driving force behind the Mets, her survivors did not share her enthusiasm. Charles delegated his authority to his three daughters, who left control of baseball matters to club chairman M. Donald Grant. According to an interview with Kranepool, he was the only Met player invited to Mrs. Payson's funeral.

The Mets enjoyed the second best winning percentage in franchise history in 1976 when they went 86–76 to finish third in the NL East. Kranepool was again a regular first baseman with the Mets that season, batting .292 with 10 home runs and 49 RBIs. He compiled his best offensive years from 1974 through 1977, hitting .299 in 431 games with 28 home runs and 156 runs batted in.

=== 1977–1979: Pinch-hitting and retirement ===
Popular centerfielder Lee Mazzilli became the face of the organization. Kranepool, perhaps as a symbol of the Mets' past glory, emerged as a fan favorite as well, despite his relegation to a limited pinch hitting role at that point in his career. From 1974 through 1978, Kranepool hit .396 as a pinch hitter, batting .486 (17-for-35) in the role in 1974, still the major league single-season pinch hit batting average record. After the Mets traded Jerry Koosman at the end of the 1978 season, Kranepool became the last of the 1969 Miracle Mets.

When he retired after the 1979 season at the age of 34, he was the all-time Mets leader in eight offensive categories (all since surpassed).

As a pinch-hitter, Kranepool went 90-for-325 (.277) in his career with 6 home runs and 55 RBI.

Through the 2024 season, he still holds the mark of most games played with the Mets at 1,853 and became an enduring legend among Mets fans for having played 18 seasons. He was the last of the 1962 Mets to remain with the team, and the last of that team to retire from Major League Baseball.

Though still relatively young at that time, he was only useful as long as his pinch-hits kept dropping in. He had also reportedly had some friction with the team's ownership group, led by Lorinda DeRoulet who was controlling the team after the death of her mother, Joan Payson. When the team was sold after the 1979 season to a group headed by Nelson Doubleday Jr. and Fred Wilpon, Kranepool was part of one of the groups offering a losing bid.

Seasons	Games	AB	Runs	Hits	2B	3B	HR	RBI	SB	BB	SO	Avg.	Slg.	SF
18	1853	5436	536	1418	225	25	118	614	15	454	581	.261	.377	58

Kranepool had career fielding percentage of .994 as a first baseman and .975 as an outfielder. Overall, he finished with a .993 fielding percentage.

== Commercials and television appearances ==
A 1978 television commercial for Gillette Foamy shaving cream began with black-and-white film footage of Kranepool striking out, and an announcer saying, "From 1962 to 1970, Ed Kranepool batted .227. Then Ed switched to Gillette Foamy." The ad showed Kranepool in front of a mirror, lathering up and shaving, and switched to color footage of him hitting a ball down the right-field line. The announcer said, "Since 1971, Ed's batted .283! What do you think of that, Ed?" As baseball players had long had a reputation for being superstitious, the ad closed with Kranepool standing in the dugout, in uniform but lathered up and holding up a can of Foamy, saying, "I don't know, but now I shave every other inning." The closing narration was, "Foamy: More than thick and rich enough for New York's heavy hitters."

Another Gillette commercial featured Kranepool lighting a candle in his bathroom and trying to shave using Foamy during a blackout. The ad was clearly inspired by the New York blackout of the previous season, which came during a Mets home game at Shea Stadium on July 13, 1977. Kranepool also appeared in an ad for SportsPhone with Jerry Koosman.

Kranepool caught flak for a 1986 campaign commercial he did for New York Senator Alfonse D'Amato in which he appeared wearing a New York Mets uniform. Following protest from the Mets' ownership group, the commercial was quickly pulled. Kranepool also appeared on Saturday Night Live in a cameo appearance, being interviewed by Bill Murray during a skit filmed during spring training in 1979, regarding Chico Escuela's (portrayed by Garrett Morris) tell all book, Bad Stuff 'bout The Mets (a parody of Sparky Lyle's tell all book about the New York Yankees, The Bronx Zoo). He appeared as himself in a 1999 episode of Everybody Loves Raymond along with several other members of the 1969 Mets.

== Post-retirement and health problems ==
Kranepool made a living after retirement as a stockbroker, a restaurateur, and working for a credit card processing company. He was inducted into the New York Mets Hall of Fame in 1990. He ranks third on the all-time Mets hits list with 1,418. He was surpassed by Mets third baseman David Wright, with 1,777, and, in 2017, by José Reyes, who has 1,534 hits as a member of the Mets.

Kranepool developed diabetes shortly after retirement. In 2017, Kranepool had a toe removed due to an abscess that became infected. The infection could not be controlled because both of his kidneys were failing. At the time, Kranepool was on a waiting list for a kidney transplant. On May 7, 2019, Kranepool received a kidney transplant from a living donor at Stony Brook University Hospital.

Kranepool's autobiography, The Last Miracle: My 18-Year Journey with the Amazin' New York Mets, was released in August 2023.

=== Death ===
Kranepool died of cardiac arrest in Boca Raton, Florida, on September 8, 2024, at the age of 79.

== See also ==
- List of Major League Baseball players who spent their entire career with one franchise
