= Bill Wakefield =

American baseball player (born 1941)

- Pitcher
- Born: May 24, 1941 (age 85); Kansas City, Missouri, U.S.
- Batted: Right Threw: Right

MLB debut
- April 18, 1964, for the New York Mets

Last MLB appearance
- October 4, 1964, for the New York Mets

MLB statistics
- Win–loss record: 3–5
- Earned run average: 3.61
- Strikeouts: 61
- Stats at Baseball Reference

Teams
- New York Mets (1964)

William Sumner Wakefield (born May 24, 1941) is an American former pitcher in Major League Baseball who played for the New York Mets during the 1964 season. Listed at 6 feet (1.83 m), 175 pounds (79 kg), Wakefield batted and threw right-handed. A native of Kansas City, Missouri, he attended the Pembroke Country-Day School and Stanford University.

Wakefield was signed as an amateur free agent by the St. Louis Cardinals in 1961. On November 4, 1963, Wakefield along with George Altman were traded to the New York Mets in exchange for Roger Craig.

In one season career, Wakefield posted a 3–5 record with a 3.61 ERA in 62 appearances, including four starts and two saves, giving up 48 earned runs on 103 hits and 61 walks while striking out 61 in 119.2 innings of work.
