= Jesse Gonder =

American baseball player (1936–2004)

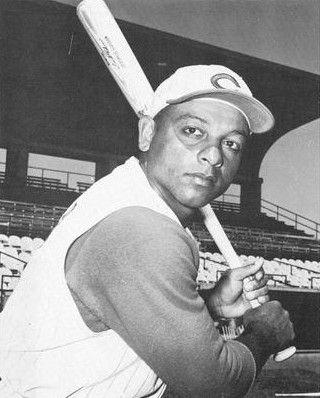
- Gonder with the Cincinnati Reds
- Catcher
- Born: January 20, 1936; Monticello, Arkansas, U.S.
- Died: November 14, 2004 (aged 68); Oakland, California, U.S.
- Batted: Left Threw: Right

MLB debut
- September 23, 1960, for the New York Yankees

Last MLB appearance
- June 17, 1967, for the Pittsburgh Pirates

MLB statistics
- Batting average: .251
- Home runs: 26
- Runs batted in: 94
- Stats at Baseball Reference

Teams
- New York Yankees (1960–1961); Cincinnati Reds (1962–1963); New York Mets (1963–1965); Milwaukee Braves (1965); Pittsburgh Pirates (1966–1967)

Jesse Lemar Gonder (January 20, 1936 – November 14, 2004) was an American professional baseball player. A catcher and pinch hitter, he played in Major League Baseball from 1960 to 1967 for the New York Yankees, Cincinnati Reds, New York Mets, Milwaukee Braves and Pittsburgh Pirates. Gonder batted left-handed, threw right-handed, and was listed as 5 feet 10 inches (1.78 m) tall and 180 pounds (82 kg). He played for Baseball Hall of Fame manager Casey Stengel with both the Yankees (1960) and Mets (1963–65).

He was born in Monticello, Arkansas, but attended McClymonds High School in Oakland, California, alma mater of Basketball Hall of Fame center Bill Russell, as well as two of Gonder's future MLB teammates, Frank Robinson and Vada Pinson. Gonder signed with Cincinnati in 1955 and began his 15-year professional career. Acquired by the Yankees' Triple-A Richmond Virginians affiliate in 1960, he made his MLB debut that September and hit a pinch home run at Yankee Stadium off Bill Monbouquette for his first big-league hit on September 30. He was a member of the Yankees for the first weeks of the 1961 season as a pinch hitter before being sent back to Richmond for the rest of the year. The Reds then reacquired Gonder in an off-season trade for pitcher Marshall Bridges.

Assigned to the Triple-A San Diego Padres, Gonder led the 1962 Pacific Coast League in batting (.342) and runs batted in (116) and was named the PCL's most valuable player. He was recalled by Cincinnati that September, then spent the following four full seasons in the National League. Gonder batted over .300 in 1963 (.304) in part-time duty for the Reds and Mets, and was the Mets' regular catcher in 1964, starting behind the plate for 82 games and setting personal bests in home runs (seven) and runs batted in (35).

Gonder reverted to part-time status in 1965, and for the remainder of his big-league career played behind regular catchers Chris Cannizzaro, Joe Torre and Jim Pagliaroni. He was sent to Triple-A in June 1967 and wrapped up his pro career in 1969.

In the Majors, Gonder collected 220 hits, including 28 doubles, two triples and 26 home runs. Five of those home runs came as a pinch hitter.

Gonder died in Oakland after a brief illness on November 14, 2004 at the age of 68.
