= Steve Dillon (baseball) =

American baseball player (born 1943)

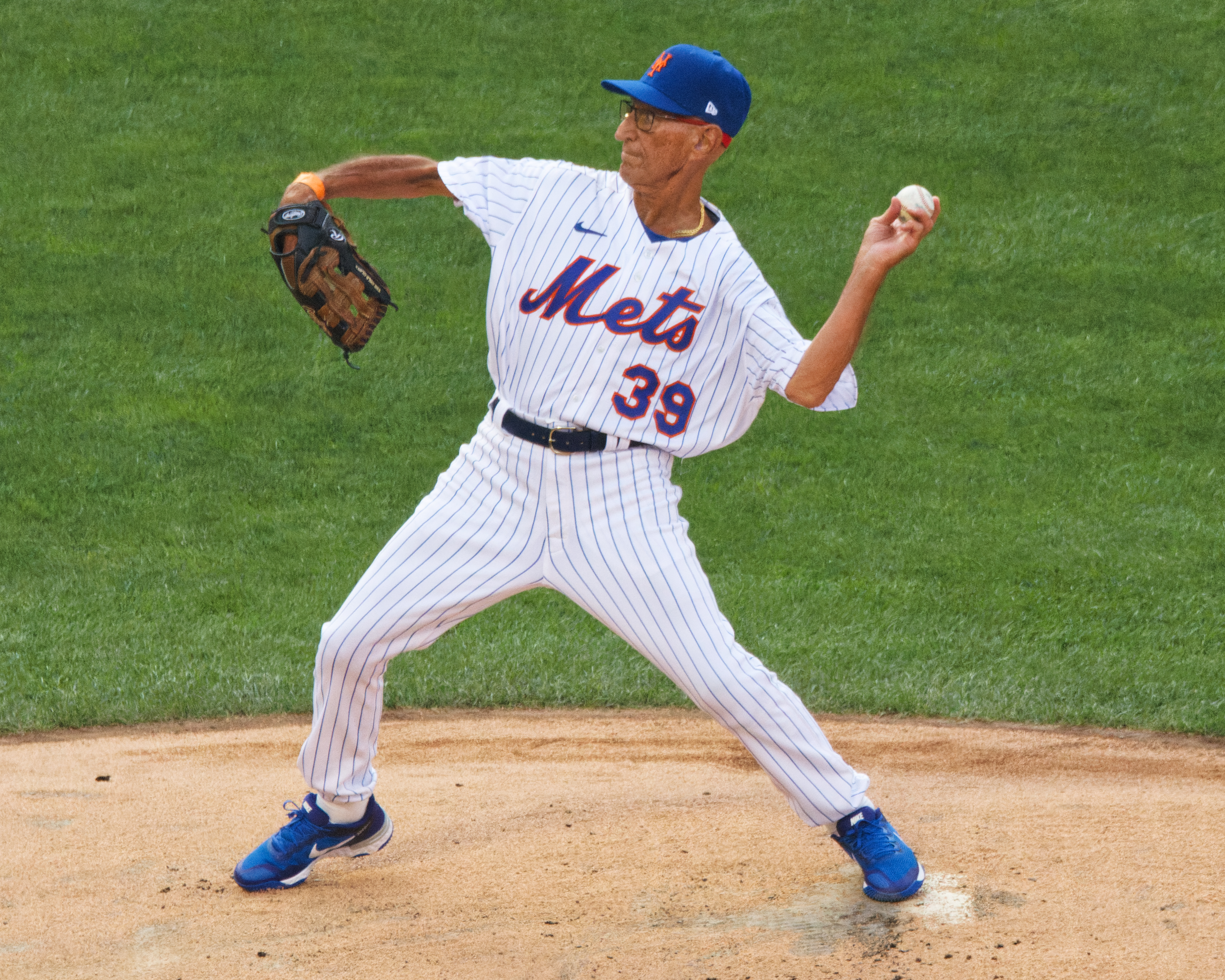
- Dillon pitching at Old-Timers' Day in 2022
- Pitcher
- Born: March 20, 1943 (age 83); Yonkers, New York, U.S.
- Batted: Left Threw: Left

MLB debut
- September 5, 1963, for the New York Mets

Last MLB appearance
- May 6, 1964, for the New York Mets

MLB statistics
- Win–loss record: 0–0
- Earned run average: 9.64
- Innings: 4 2/3
- Stats at Baseball Reference

Teams
- New York Mets (1963–1964)

Stephen Edward Dillon (born March 20, 1943) is an American former professional baseball player. He was a left-handed pitcher whose professional career lasted for four seasons (1962–1965), including major league stints with the 1963 and 1964 New York Mets. While Dillon appeared in only three major league games during his career, all in relief, he pitched in the first-ever night game played at Shea Stadium on May 6, 1964.

Standing at 5 feet 10 inches (1.78 m) tall and 160 pounds (73 kg), Dillon began his professional career by signing with the New York Yankees. In 1962, he turned in a stellar 14–7 win–loss record for the Fort Lauderdale Yankees of the Class D Florida State League, striking out 196 batters in 169 innings pitched, with a 2.61 earned run average. After the season, he was selected by the Mets in the first-year player draft and spent 1963 with the Triple-A Buffalo Bisons. He made his Met debut on Thursday, September 5, in a 9–0 loss to the St. Louis Cardinals at Busch Stadium. Relieving Roger Craig in the sixth inning, he lasted 1 2/3 frames and gave up three hits and two earned runs (on a triple by Tim McCarver), with one strikeout.

He earned a spot at the Mets' 28-man roster out of spring training in 1964, and hurled an inning of relief on April 24 at Pittsburgh's Forbes Field before being called into the first game played under the lights at the Mets' new ballpark, Shea Stadium, on Wednesday, May 6. He was the Mets' fifth and final pitcher that evening in a 12–4 loss to the Cincinnati Reds. Dillon got the Reds out in order in the eighth inning, but in the ninth, he gave up a leadoff home run to Vada Pinson and a single to Leo Cárdenas that scored a run. Pinson's blast hit the right-center field scoreboard at the new park. When Dillon reached the dugout, legendary Mets' manager Casey Stengel told him, "Listen, if another player hits a home run off that scoreboard and breaks it, you're paying for it." It was Dillon's last big league game; he returned to minor league baseball when the rosters were reduced to 25 men in May.

Dillon retired from baseball because of low minor league wages. His major league totals included seven hits and five earned runs allowed in 4 2/3 innings pitched, with three strikeouts. Dillon became a salesman, then a New York City police officer for over twenty years. As of 2009, he was living in Baldwin, Nassau County, New York, on Long Island. Steve pitched in the Mets Old Timers game at Citi Field on August 27, 2022.
