= Bobby Klaus =

American baseball player (born 1937)

- Infielder
- Born: December 27, 1937 (age 88); Spring Grove, Illinois, U.S.
- Batted: Right Threw: Right

MLB debut
- April 21, 1964, for the Cincinnati Reds

Last MLB appearance
- October 5, 1965, for the New York Mets

MLB statistics
- Batting average: .208
- Home runs: 6
- Runs batted in: 29
- Stats at Baseball Reference

Teams
- Cincinnati Reds (1964); New York Mets (1964–1965)

Robert Francis Klaus (born December 27, 1937) is an American former right-handed Major League Baseball (MLB) infielder who played from 1964 to 1965 for the Cincinnati Reds and New York Mets. He is the brother of the late MLB infielder Billy Klaus.

Prior to playing professional baseball, Klaus attended University of Illinois at Urbana–Champaign. Klaus was 5 ft 10 in (1.78 m) and weighed 170 pounds (77 kg).

Originally signed as an amateur free agent by the Cincinnati Redlegs in 1959, Klaus made his big league debut on April 21, 1964, against Jimmy Wynn and the rest of the Houston Colt .45s as a pinch hitter for pitcher Jim O'Toole. He did not get an official at-bat in his first game because a runner on base was caught trying to advance.

Klaus did poorly as a brief replacement for Pete Rose in 1964 with the Reds, batting .183 in 40 games. He was purchased by the Mets on July 19 of that year. He played for the Mets in 56 games, compiling a .244 batting average. In 96 games in his rookie season, he batted .225.

Klaus's final season in the big leagues was 1965. In 119 games with the Mets, he collected 55 hits in 288 at-bats for a .191 batting average. He showed a fair eye at the plate, with his walk total nearly matching his strikeout total – 45 and 49, respectively.

He played his final big league game on October 3, 1965, against the Philadelphia Phillies. He ended his career on a sour note, collecting no hits in five at bats in his final game.

In his big league career, he played in 215 total games, collecting 123 hits in 590 at-bats for a .208 batting average. He hit 25 doubles, 4 triples, and 6 home runs; scored 65 runs and drove 29 in; stole 5 bases and was caught 10 times; and walked 74 times and struck out 92 times. He committed 21 errors in the field for a .973 fielding percentage.

Statistically, he is most similar to Buddy Biancalana.

Although his big league career ended after the 1965 season, he still stuck around in pro baseball for a while, and was part of some notable transactions. On February 22, 1966, he was traded by the Mets with Wayne Graham and Jimmie Schaffer to the Phillies for Dick Stuart.

On December 2, 1968, he was drafted by the San Diego Padres from the Phillies in the rule 5 draft.

On March 28, 1969, he was traded by the Padres with Ron Davis to the Pittsburgh Pirates for Tommie Sisk and Chris Cannizzaro.
