= Larry Bearnarth =

American baseball player (1941–2000)

- Pitcher
- Born: September 11, 1940; New York City, New York, U.S.
- Died: January 1, 2000 (aged 59); St. Petersburg, Florida, U.S.
- Batted: Right Threw: Right

MLB debut
- April 16, 1963, for the New York Mets

Last MLB appearance
- May 30, 1971, for the Milwaukee Brewers

MLB statistics
- Win–loss record: 13–21
- Earned run average: 4.13
- Strikeouts: 124
- Stats at Baseball Reference

Teams
- As player: New York Mets (1963–1966); Milwaukee Brewers (1971); As coach: Montreal Expos (1976, 1985–1991); Colorado Rockies (1993–1995)

Lawrence Donald Bearnarth (September 11, 1940 – January 1, 2000) was an American relief pitcher in Major League Baseball who played for the New York Mets (1963–66) and Milwaukee Brewers (1971). Bearnarth batted and threw right-handed and was listed as 6 feet 2 inches (1.88 m) tall and 203 pounds (92 kg).

== Personal ==
Bearnarth was born in a Manhattan hospital but lived his childhood in Brooklyn and later on Staten Island. He went to St. Peter's Boys High School on Staten Island and played varsity basketball and baseball. He then attended St. John's University, and graduated with a degree in English literature. On December 31, 1999, he had a heart attack at his home in Florida, and died at St. Anthony's Hospital in St. Petersburg the following day, at the age of 59.

== Playing career ==
In a five-season career, Bearnarth posted a 13–21 record with a 4.13 ERA and eight saves in 173 games pitched. He allowed 350 hits and 135 bases on balls in 3222/3 innings pitched, with 124 strikeouts.

Bearnarth was signed by the New York Mets in 1962 and went directly to the Triple-A Syracuse Chiefs of the International League. A year later wearing #31, he started his big league career for the 1963 Mets, a team coming off an historic 40–120 record in its inaugural season as an expansion team. Despite his 3–8 record in his rookie year, Bearnarth maintained a 3.46 ERA in a career-high 1261/3 innings pitched. During the next three seasons, he divided his playing time between the Mets and Triple-A Buffalo and Jacksonville.

From 1967 to 1970 Bearnarth pitched in Triple-A with the Jacksonville Suns (1967–68) and Tidewater Tides. In 1971 he was signed as a free agent by the Milwaukee Brewers and wore #29, retiring at the end of the season.

He was able to obtain the required pension time as an active player (five years then). Then, following his playing career, he became a pitching coach.

Bearnarth became pitching coach for the Montreal Expos in 1976 wearing #48 and between 1985 and 1991 wearing #36. Under his guidance, the team's ERA never was higher than 3.92 (in 1986), including the best ERA in franchise history, at 3.08 (1988). Two years later, his staff led the National League with a 3.37 ERA (1990). He was a minor league pitching instructor in the Montreal farm system between those terms.

In 1993 Bearnarth became the first pitching coach in Colorado Rockies history wearing #36, continuing in that post until 1995. After that, he scouted during four seasons for the Detroit Tigers (1996–99).

== See also ==
- List of people from Staten Island § Sports
- Staten Island Sports Hall of Fame

Preceded by Cal McLish; Galen Cisco	Montreal Expos pitching coach 1976; 1985–1991	Succeeded by Jim Brewer; Joe Kerrigan
Preceded by Franchise established	Colorado Rockies pitching coach 1993–1995	Succeeded by Frank Funk
