= Willard Hunter =

American baseball player (1935–2021)

- Pitcher
- Born: March 8, 1935; Newark, New Jersey, U.S.
- Died: February 3, 2021 (aged 85); Omaha, Nebraska, U.S.
- Batted: Right Threw: Left

MLB debut
- April 16, 1962, for the Los Angeles Dodgers

Last MLB appearance
- October 4, 1964, for the New York Mets

MLB statistics
- Win–loss record: 4–9
- Earned run average: 5.68
- Strikeouts: 63
- Stats at Baseball Reference

Teams
- Los Angeles Dodgers (1962); New York Mets (1962, 1964)

Willard Mitchell Hunter (March 8, 1935 – February 3, 2021) was an American professional baseball player who pitched in the Major Leagues in 1962 and 1964 for the Los Angeles Dodgers and New York Mets. Of his 69 games pitched over parts of two seasons in MLB, all but one came as a member of the Mets. He threw left-handed, batted right-handed, and was listed as 6 feet 2 inches (1.88 m) tall and 180 pounds (82 kg).

In 1964, Hunter became the second Met pitcher to record two wins in a single day. (Craig Anderson had performed the feat first in 1962.) On August 23, 1964, Hunter pitched at the back end of both games of a doubleheader against the Chicago Cubs at Shea Stadium. He gave up no hits or runs in 12/3 total innings pitched, and in both cases, the Mets rallied to give Hunter the win. Hunter had only three wins for the Mets that season—four in his MLB career—and two came on a single day.

Born in Newark, New Jersey, Hunter attended Wake Forest University and signed with the Brooklyn Dodgers in time for the 1955 season. He spent six full years in minor league baseball before making the Dodgers' opening-season 28-man roster in 1962. In his MLB debut, a mop-up assignment against the San Francisco Giants at Candlestick Park, Hunter entered the game in the sixth inning with Los Angeles trailing, 9–1; he was already the Dodgers' fourth pitcher of the day. He lasted two innings, but gave up ten runs, nine of them earned, on six hits and four bases on balls. He was removed for pinch hitter Frank Howard in the Dodgers' eighth inning. San Francisco ended up winning, 19–8.

Hunter then was sent to the Triple-A Omaha Dodgers, spent a month in the American Association, and on May 25 was assigned to the Mets as the player to be named later in the December 15, 1961, trade in which Los Angeles acquired outfielder Lee Walls. He then worked in 27 games for the Mets, including six as a starting pitcher. He was credited with a complete game on June 20 in a rain-shortened, six-inning contest against the Milwaukee Braves at the Polo Grounds, but Milwaukee won 3–2 with Hunter absorbing the loss. It was the only complete game of Hunter's big-league career.

After Hunter spent the entire 1963 season and the outset of 1964 with the Triple-A Buffalo Bisons, he returned to the Mets in June 1964. In 41 games pitched, all of them in relief, he split six total decisions and recorded five saves. His professional career ended with Buffalo in 1965.

In Hunter's 69 MLB games and 114 innings pitched, he allowed 127 hits and 47 bases on balls; he struck out 63. He compiled a 4–9 win–loss mark and 5.68 earned run average, with five saves.

Hunter died on February 3, 2021, in Omaha, Nebraska.
