= Ben Flowers =

American baseball player (1927–2009)

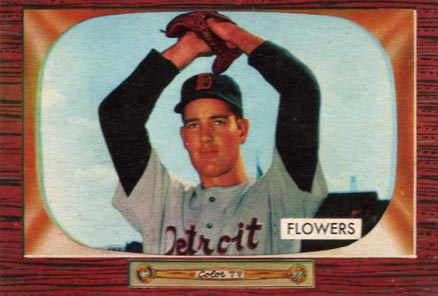
- Flowers in 1955
- Pitcher
- Born: June 15, 1927; Goldsboro, North Carolina, U.S.
- Died: February 18, 2009 (aged 81); Wilson, North Carolina, U.S.
- Batted: Right Threw: Right

MLB debut
- September 29, 1951, for the Boston Red Sox

Last MLB appearance
- September 21, 1956, for the Philadelphia Phillies

MLB statistics
- Win–loss record: 3–7
- Earned run average: 4.48
- Strikeouts: 86
- Stats at Baseball Reference

Teams
- Boston Red Sox (1951, 1953); Detroit Tigers (1955); St. Louis Cardinals (1955–1956); Philadelphia Phillies (1956)

Bennett Flowers (June 15, 1927 – February 18, 2009) was an American professional baseball pitcher who played in Major League Baseball for four teams between 1951 and 1956. During his playing days, Flowers stood 6 feet 4 inches (1.93 m) tall, weighed 195 pounds (88 kg) and batted and threw right-handed. He was a native of Goldsboro, North Carolina.

Flowers, a knuckleball pitcher, debuted in the major leagues with the Boston Red Sox, appearing in 33 games pitched, one in 1951 and 32 during the full season of 1953. Then, during 1955 and 1956, he worked in 43 total games for three MLB teams: the Detroit Tigers (1955), St. Louis Cardinals (1955–1956) and Philadelphia Phillies (1956). His most productive season came for the 1953 Red Sox, when he posted career-bests in earned run average (ERA) (3.86), strikeouts (36), and innings pitched (871/3), in 32 games, including six starts, and one shutout, while recording all three of his career saves. His lone big-league shutout and complete game happened on August 5, when he blanked the St. Louis Browns, 5–0, at Fenway Park, allowing eight hits and two bases on balls. The losing pitcher in that contest was Don Larsen, later to be immortalized as a New York Yankee by his perfect game during the 1956 World Series.

Over all or parts of four MLB seasons, Flowers posted a career 3–7 won–lost record, with a 4.49 ERA and three saves in 76 games, including 13 starts. He recorded one shutout and 31 games finished. In 1681/3 innings of work, he allowed 190 hits and 54 bases on balls, with 86 strikeouts. His entire pro career lasted for 15 years (1945–1946; 1948–1960).
