= Galen Cisco =

American baseball player (born 1936)

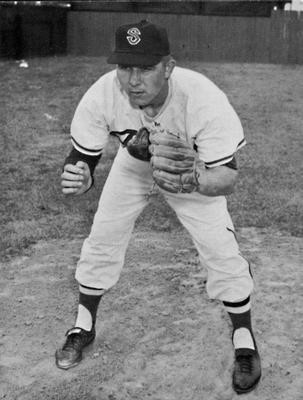
- Pitcher
- Born: March 7, 1936 (age 89); St. Marys, Ohio, U.S.
- Batted: Right Threw: Right

MLB debut
- June 11, 1961, for the Boston Red Sox

Last MLB appearance
- September 7, 1969, for the Kansas City Royals

MLB statistics
- Win–loss record: 25–56
- Earned run average: 4.56
- Strikeouts: 325
- Stats at Baseball Reference

Teams
- As player: Boston Red Sox (1961–1962); New York Mets (1962–1965); Boston Red Sox (1967); Kansas City Royals (1969); As coach: Kansas City Royals (1971–1979); Montreal Expos (1980–1984); San Diego Padres (1985–1987); Toronto Blue Jays (1990–1995); Philadelphia Phillies (1997–2000)

Career highlights and awards
- 2× World Series champion (1992, 1993)

Galen Bernard Cisco (born March 7, 1936) is an American former professional baseball player and coach. He was a pitcher in Major League Baseball for three different teams between 1961 and 1969. Listed at 6 feet (1.8 m) tall and 200 pounds (91 kg), Cisco batted and threw right-handed. He was signed by the Boston Red Sox in 1958 out of Ohio State University.

A two-sport star, Cisco earned All-American and All-Big Ten honors and was a captain on the 1957 Ohio State Buckeyes football team, which won the national championship with a 9–1 record, playing both fullback and linebacker. As a pitcher for the Buckeyes, he compiled a career record of 12–2.

== Playing career ==
A curveball specialist, Cisco entered the Majors in 1961 with the Boston Red Sox, playing a little over a season for them before the New York Mets acquired him via waivers on September 6, 1962. The 1962 Mets ended up with a record of 40–120, a record for most losses by a Major League Baseball team in a single season until 2024. Cisco, however, posted a .500 record (1–1) in his four late-season appearances for them, including a complete game, 4–1 victory over the Chicago Cubs at the Polo Grounds on September 21. Cisco was a member of the cellar-dwelling Mets for the full seasons of 1963 through 1965, going 18–43 overall with a 4.04 earned run average in 126 games.

He returned to the Red Sox for part of the 1967 season, and was then acquired by the expansion Kansas City Royals, where he finished his active MLB career in 1969. In a seven-season career, he posted a 25–56 record with a 4.56 ERA in 192 appearances, including 78 starts, nine complete games, three shutouts, two saves, and a 1.16 strikeout-to-walk ratio (325-to-281).

== Coaching career ==
Following his playing retirement, Cisco became a pitching coach for the Royals, Montreal Expos, San Diego Padres, Toronto Blue Jays and Philadelphia Phillies, serving for all or parts of 28 years. He spent six seasons with the Blue Jays (1990–1995), helping his team to win three consecutive American League East Division titles (1991–93) and two World Series (1992–93). Under his guidance, Paul Byrd, Robert Person and Randy Wolf developed as starters with the Phillies (1997–2000).

== Personal life ==
As of 2025, Cisco resides in Celina, Ohio.

== See also ==
- List of Ohio State University people

Preceded by Bob Lemon	Kansas City Royals pitching coach 1971–1979	Succeeded by Billy Connors
Preceded by Jim Brewer	Montreal Expos pitching coach 1980–1984	Succeeded by Larry Bearnarth
Preceded by Norm Sherry	San Diego Padres pitching coach 1985–1987	Succeeded by Pat Dobson
Preceded by Al Widmar	Toronto Blue Jays pitching coach 1990–1995	Succeeded by Mel Queen
Preceded by Johnny Podres	Philadelphia Phillies pitching coach 1997–2000	Succeeded by Vern Ruhle
