= Al Moran =

American baseball player (born 1938)

- Shortstop
- Born: December 5, 1938 (age 86); Detroit, Michigan, U.S.
- Batted: Right Threw: Right

MLB debut
- April 9, 1963, for the New York Mets

Last MLB appearance
- May 10, 1964, for the New York Mets

MLB statistics
- Batting average: .195
- Home runs: 1
- Runs batted in: 27

Teams
- New York Mets (1963–1964)

Richard Alan Moran (born December 5, 1938) is an American former Major League Baseball shortstop who played in 1963 and 1964 for the New York Mets. Born in Detroit, he threw and batted right-handed and was listed as 6 feet 1 inch (1.85 m) tall and 190 pounds (86 kg).

Moran attended Detroit Catholic Central High School. Originally signed by the Boston Red Sox before the 1958 season, Moran was sent to the Mets on January 14, 1963, to complete a trade that occurred on December 11, 1962. In the deal, the Red Sox dealt pitcher Tracy Stallard, infielder Pumpsie Green and a player to be named later (Moran) to the Mets for Félix Mantilla.

Moran made his big league debut on April 9, 1963, at New York's Polo Grounds at the age of 24 against the St. Louis Cardinals. Facing right-hander Ernie Broglio, Moran went 0–3 in his debut. The rest of his team didn't fare much better in that game – Broglio held them to two hits and threw a 7–0, complete game shutout.

Overall, in his rookie season, Moran appeared in 119 games and collected 64 hits in 331 at-bats for a .193 batting average for a team that lost 111 games and hit only .219 overall. Moran started 112 games at shortstop and posted a .951 fielding percentage.

In May 1964, Moran was replaced as the Mets' shortstop by 34-year-old veteran Roy McMillan, a former National League All-Star and two-time Gold Glove Award winner. Moran appeared in only 16 games before being sent to Triple-A Buffalo. In 22 at-bats, he collected five hits for a .227 batting average. He played his final big league game on May 10, 1964, against the Cardinals.

Overall in his two-year MLB career, Moran played in 135 games, collecting 69 hits in 353 at-bats for a .195 batting average. He hit five doubles, two triples and one home run, off Baseball Hall of Fame left-hander Warren Spahn, August 31, 1963, at the Polo Grounds. He scored 28 runs with 27 runs batted in, three stolen bases in ten attempts, 38 walks and 62 strikeouts.

Moran retired from professional baseball in 1966 after nine seasons.
