= Dick Smith (outfielder/first baseman) =

American baseball player (1939–2012)

- Outfielder/First baseman
- Born: May 17, 1939; Lebanon, Oregon, U.S.
- Died: February 19, 2012 (aged 72); Medford, Oregon, U.S.
- Batted: Right Threw: Right

MLB debut
- July 20, 1963, for the New York Mets

Last MLB appearance
- May 1, 1965, for the Los Angeles Dodgers

MLB statistics
- Batting average: .218
- On-base percentage: .260
- Slugging average: .289
- Games played: 76
- Stats at Baseball Reference

Teams
- New York Mets (1963–1964); Los Angeles Dodgers (1965)

Richard Arthur Smith (May 17, 1939 – February 19, 2012) was an American professional baseball player who appeared in 76 games as an outfielder, first baseman and pinch hitter in Major League Baseball for the New York Mets and Los Angeles Dodgers over parts of three seasons spanning 1963–1965. Born in Lebanon, Oregon, Smith threw and batted right-handed, stood 6 feet 2 inches (1.88 m) tall and weighed 205 pounds (93 kg). He attended Oregon State University.

Smith began his pro career in the Dodger farm system in 1957, and after six minor-league seasons his contract was purchased by the Mets on October 11, 1962. In 1963, he was recalled from Triple-A Buffalo in July and batted .238 with ten hits through the end of the season. His most extended service in the majors came in 1964, appearing in 46 early-season games for the Mets. He collected another 21 hits as Met, batting .223, before returning to Buffalo. After that season, on October 15, the Mets traded him back the Dodgers in exchange for pitcher Larry Miller. He made the eventual 1965 World Series champion Dodgers out of training camp and went hitless in six early-season at bats before being sent back to Triple-A when rosters were cut from 28 to 25 men. It proved to be his last trial in MLB. He retired in 1968 after 12 years in professional baseball.

Smith batted .218 during his MLB career; his 31 hits included six doubles and two triples. He was credited with seven runs batted in. He hit 120 home runs as a minor-leaguer.

On May 26, 1964, in a 19–1 win over the Chicago Cubs, Smith became the first Met to record five hits in a game.
