= Jim Hickman (1960s outfielder) =

American baseball player (1937–2016)

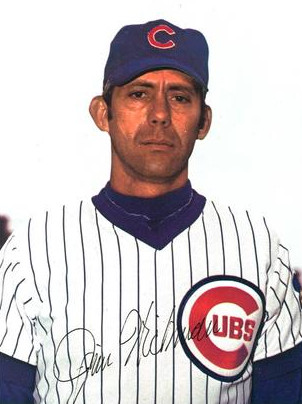
- Hickman in 1973
- Outfielder / First baseman
- Born: May 10, 1937; Henning, Tennessee, U.S.
- Died: June 25, 2016 (aged 79); Jackson, Tennessee, U.S.
- Batted: Right Threw: Right

MLB debut
- April 14, 1962, for the New York Mets

Last MLB appearance
- July 14, 1974, for the St. Louis Cardinals

MLB statistics
- Batting average: .252
- Home runs: 159
- Runs batted in: 560
- Stats at Baseball Reference

Teams
- New York Mets (1962–1966); Los Angeles Dodgers (1967); Chicago Cubs (1968–1973); St. Louis Cardinals (1974)

Career highlights and awards
- All-Star (1970)

James Lucius Hickman (May 10, 1937 – June 25, 2016), nicknamed "Gentleman Jim", was an American professional baseball outfielder and first baseman. He played 13 seasons in Major League Baseball (MLB) for the New York Mets, Los Angeles Dodgers, Chicago Cubs, and St. Louis Cardinals.

== Career ==
Hickman was signed by the St. Louis Cardinals as an amateur free agent prior to the 1956 season; he spent six seasons in the Cardinals’ farm system until he was selected by the New York Mets in the 1961 Major League Baseball expansion draft.

=== New York Mets ===
Hickman played 624 games with the Mets, from 1962 through 1966. He batted .241 with 60 home runs and 210 RBI.

Hickman has earned several places in Mets history. He was the first Met to hit for the cycle, accomplishing the feat in a 7–3 victory over the St. Louis Cardinals at the Polo Grounds on August 7, 1963; it is one of the few natural cycles in Major League history. A month later, on September 18, he hit the last home run ever hit at the Polo Grounds, a solo against Chris Short of the Philadelphia Phillies in a 5–1 Mets' loss, in the final game ever played at that stadium. Hickman was also the first Met to hit three home runs in one game, at Sportsman's Park on September 3, 1965, in a 6–3 victory over the Cardinals. All three home runs were hit off Ray Sadecki. Finally, he was the last of the original Mets, when he was traded to the Dodgers (along with infielder Ron Hunt) for outfielder Tommy Davis on November 29, 1966. Hickman also set a pair of Shea Stadium firsts, earning the team's first walk and first batter hit by pitch, both accomplished in the team's inaugural game at the stadium, a 4–3 loss to the Pittsburgh Pirates on April 17, 1964.

=== Los Angeles Dodgers ===
Hickman spent 1967 with the Dodgers, batting just .163 in 65 games played, with no home runs and 10 RBIs.

=== Chicago Cubs ===
In April 1968, Hickman was traded to the Cubs. During the 1968 season he hit .223, and in 1969 he hit .237. Hickman then had his best season in 1970, when he hit .315 with 162 hits, 33 doubles, 32 home runs, 115 RBIs, 102 runs scored, and 93 walks — all career highs. His performance won the National League Comeback Player of the Year Award and placed him 8th in the NL Most Valuable Player balloting.

Hickman made his only All-Star appearance on July 14, 1970, at the Cincinnati Reds' newly opened Riverfront Stadium where, in the 12th inning, his RBI single drove in hometown favorite Pete Rose for the winning run, Rose barreling over Cleveland Indian catcher Ray Fosse to score the run. Like Hickman, the pitchers of record were also Tennessee natives; Claude Osteen, Hickman's Dodger teammate in 1967, was the winning pitcher, while Hickman collected the walk-off single off Clyde Wright, his eventual 1970 American League Comeback Player of the Year counterpart.

In his six seasons with Chicago, Hickman batted .267 with 97 home runs and 336 RBIs in 682 games played.

=== St. Louis Cardinals ===
In March 1974, Hickman was traded to the Cardinals. He played in 50 games for them, batting .267 with two home runs and four RBIs. On July 16, 1974, he was released.

In his 13-year major league career, Hickman batted .252 with 159 home runs and 560 RBIs in 1421 games played.

== Later years ==
Hickman was inducted into the Tennessee Sports Hall of Fame in 1996. He died on June 25, 2016, aged 79.

== See also ==
- List of Major League Baseball players to hit for the cycle

Achievements
Preceded by Johnny Callison	Hitting for the cycle August 7, 1963	Succeeded by Jim King
