= The Gang That Couldn't Shoot Straight =

1971 film by James Goldstone

- Original film poster by Mort Drucker
- Directed by: James Goldstone
- Screenplay by: Waldo Salt
- Based on: The Gang That Couldn't Shoot Straight by Jimmy Breslin
- Produced by: Robert Chartoff; Irwin Winkler
- Starring: Jerry Orbach; Leigh Taylor-Young; Jo Van Fleet; Burt Young; Lionel Stander; Robert De Niro; Irving Selbst
- Cinematography: Owen Roizman
- Edited by: Edward A. Biery
- Music by: Dave Grusin
- Production company: Metro-Goldwyn-Mayer
- Distributed by: Metro-Goldwyn-Mayer
- Release date: December 22, 1971
- Running time: 96 minutes
- Country: United States
- Language: English

The Gang That Couldn't Shoot Straight is a 1971 American comedy crime film directed by James Goldstone and written by Waldo Salt, based on the 1969 novel by Jimmy Breslin, which, in turn, is based on the life of gangster Joe Gallo. The film stars Jerry Orbach, Leigh Taylor-Young, Jo Van Fleet, Lionel Stander, Robert De Niro and Irving Selbst. It was released on December 22, 1971, by Metro-Goldwyn-Mayer.

== Plot ==
Kid Sally Palumbo grows jealous of his older, mobster boss Baccala, who has little respect for the crew that Palumbo commands. Baccala allows Kid Sally to supervise a six-day bicycle race (for the purposes of keeping the money generated), and among the 12 Italian cyclists brought into the city is Mario Trantino, a budding thief.

When the bicycle race does not take place due to outside interference, Sally is demoted to serving Baccala as a chauffeur, and Trantino stays in New York City to run his own cons, which includes masquerading as a priest. Kid Sally's mother Big Momma urges him to take down the old, entrenched mobsters in power, but it appears that the only fatalities are in his own camp, and the increase in violence draws the attention of the city police.

== Cast ==
- Jerry Orbach as Salvatore 'Kid Sally' Palumbo
- Leigh Taylor-Young as Angela Palumbo
- Jo Van Fleet as Big Momma Palumbo
- Lionel Stander as Baccala
- Robert De Niro as Mario Trantino
- Irving Selbst as 'Big Jelly' Catalano
- Hervé Villechaize as Beppo 'The Dwarf'
- Joe Santos as Ezmo
- Carmine Caridi as Tony 'The Indian'
- Frank Campanella as Water Buffalo
- Harry Basch as Joseph DeLauria
- Sander Vanocur as Television Commentator
- Phil Bruns as Gallagher
- Philip Sterling as District Attorney Goodman
- Jack Kehoe as Bartender
- Despo Diamantidou as Mourner
- Sam Coppola as Julie DiBiasi
- James Sloyan as Joey
- Paul Benedict as 'Shots' O'Toole
- Lou Criscuolo as Junior
- George Loros as Jerry
- Harry Davis as Dominic Laviano
- Burt Young as Willie Quarequio
- Jackie Vernon as Herman
- Ted Beniades as A Black Suit
- Fat Thomas as A Black Suit
- Roy Shuman as The Mayor
- Alice Hirson as The Mayor's Wife
- Michael V. Gazzo as A Black Suit
- Robert Gerringer as Commissioner McGrady
- Walter Flanagan as The Super
- Dan Morgan as Muldoon
- Dorothi Fox as Meter Maid
- Robert Weil as Circus Supply Manager
- Margo Winkler as Airline Clerk
- Leopold Badia as Old Waiter
- Fran Stevens as Baccala's Wife
- Florence Tarlow as Police Matron
- Rita Karin as Mrs. Goldfarb
- Tom Lacy as Religious Salesman
- William H. Boesen as Jury Foreman
- Gary Melkonian as Greek Racer
- Gustave Johnson as Detective Jenkins
- George Stefans as Greek Captain
- Alisha Fontaine as Jelly's Girl
- Lorrie Davis as Jelly's Other Girl
- Frank Jourdano as TV Reporter
- Elsa Raven as Mrs. Buffalo
- Gloria LeRoy as Ida

== Production ==
According to Irwin Winkler, Francis Ford Coppola asked to write and direct the movie, but Winkler turned him down, feeling that Coppola did not have the skills to make a Mafia film. Al Pacino was originally cast in the lead, but during rehearsal, he pulled out to play the role of Michael Corleone in The Godfather. He was replaced by Robert De Niro.

Shot on location in South Brooklyn, the film was the subject of a Robin Green-written November 25, 1971, Rolling Stone article, "Shooting the Gang That Couldn't", which is described in its subtitle as "a behind-the-scenes look at the filming of a Robert DeNiro [sic] movie".

Hervé Villechaize made his feature film debut, but his lines were dubbed by Paul Frees to conceal his French accent, for he was playing an Italian-American character.

Winkler, in his memoirs, wrote that he felt the director was more interested in sticking to the schedule than working with the actors. He also felt the final film was neither funny nor dramatic.

== Reception ==
The movie received mostly negative reviews. On Rotten Tomatoes, the film has a score of 20%, based on 10 critic reviews.

Roger Ebert of the Chicago Sun-Times gave it 2 stars out of 4, writing, "Maybe part of the trouble is James Goldstone's direction, which tends toward the heavy-handed", and, "The performances are too broad, the characters are too many, the plot is too indifferent to the structure of the movie, and - surprisingly - the movie is too sweet."

The New York Times reviewer Howard Thompson called the film "a tasteless mess" and Jo Van Fleet's performance "terrible". His only praise was for the interaction between Leigh Taylor-Young and Robert De Niro.

J. Oliver Prescott of the Tampa Bay Times wrote a positive review, praising Jo Van Fleet and the other actors, although he had reservations about the screenplay.

Rex Reed of the New York Daily News wrote an unreservedly positive review.

== Home media ==
The movie has been released on VHS and DVD.

== In popular culture ==
Arizona State House Speaker Russell Bowers referred to the book during the January 6 Select Committee hearings when asked to express his thoughts on the 2020 Trump campaign's fake electors scheme.

== See also ==
- List of American films of 1971
