= Machinal =

Play

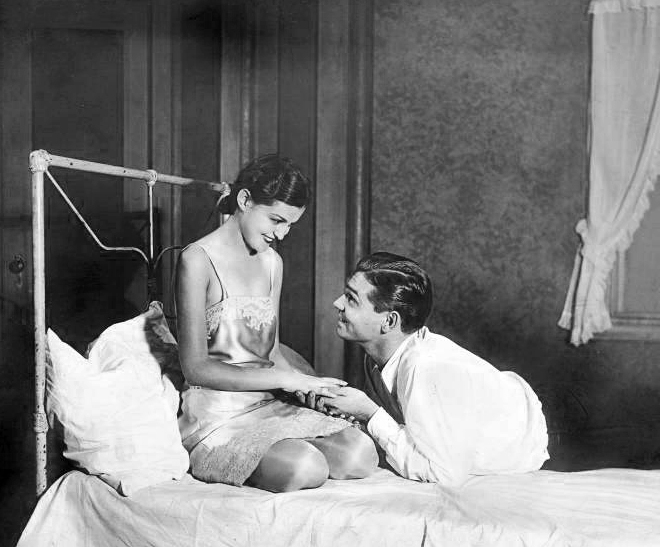
- Zita Johann and Clark Gable in the original Broadway production of Machinal (1928)
- Original language: English
- Written by: Sophie Treadwell
- Genre: Expressionism
- Setting: An office; a flat; a hotel; a hospital; a speakeasy; a furnished room; a drawing room; a court room; a prison; in the dark

Premiere
- Date: September 7, 1928
- Place: Plymouth Theatre

Machinal is a 1928 play by American playwright and journalist Sophie Treadwell, inspired by the real-life case of convicted and executed murderer Ruth Snyder. Its Broadway premiere, directed by Arthur Hopkins, is considered one of the highpoints of Expressionist theatre in history of the American stage.

Machinal has appeared on a variety of lists of the greatest plays.

== Synopsis ==
A young woman works as a low-level stenographer and lives with her mother. She follows the rituals that society expects of a woman, however resistant she may feel about them. She subsequently marries her boss, whom she finds repulsive. After having a baby with him, she has an affair with a younger man who fuels her lust for life. Driven to murder her husband, she is convicted of the crime and is executed in the electric chair.

== Stage Directions ==
In her thesis Machinal: Silence, Stage Directions and Sophie Treadwell, Susanne Kepley argues that the stage directions function as a vehicle for Sophie Treadwell’s authorial voice. During the play’s development Treadwell maintained her role as the executive voice of the play, shaping the script through deliberate stylistic and structural choices. These choices are meant to preserve the themes and aesthetics Treadwell intended. At the same time, the stage directions leave room for future creative teams to interpret the work into their own image of what the play is supposed to be.

Kepley explains the play through the lens modernist theatrical traditions, specifically referencing anti-theatricality and the “open work.” The stage directions are described as resistant. Meaning that the directions oppose literal staging and often emphasize qualities (such as “ordinary” or “beautiful”) rather than concrete actions. These specifications serve to influence with intuition, making their effect on the audience variable and unable to be measured by practical means. This ambiguity requires future writers and directors to think about what these words mean to them, making the play highly adaptable between different productions.

It's important to note that in the opening of Machinal's stage directions Treadwell states:

"The HOPE is to create a stage production that will have “style,” and at the same time, by the story’s own innate drama, by the directness of its telling, by the variety and quick changingness of its scenes, and the excitement of its sounds to create an interesting play"

This is an example of how Treadwell allows productions to interpret the stage directions in their own style and yet still maintain the narrative that she created through the subtext.

Additionally, this analysis provides a connection between the play's structure and the theatrical content. Many of the play's narrative events, including marriage, childbirth, and murder, all happen off-stage. Leaving the audience with the transitional periods. This structural choice combined with the stage directions reinforces the main idea of a mechanical society in which the protagonist struggles to articulate her experience. As a result, Machinal has been staged in many distinct ways, with various theatrical releases emphasizing different aspects of lighting, sound, and movement to connect with Treadwell's expressionistic vision.

== Production ==
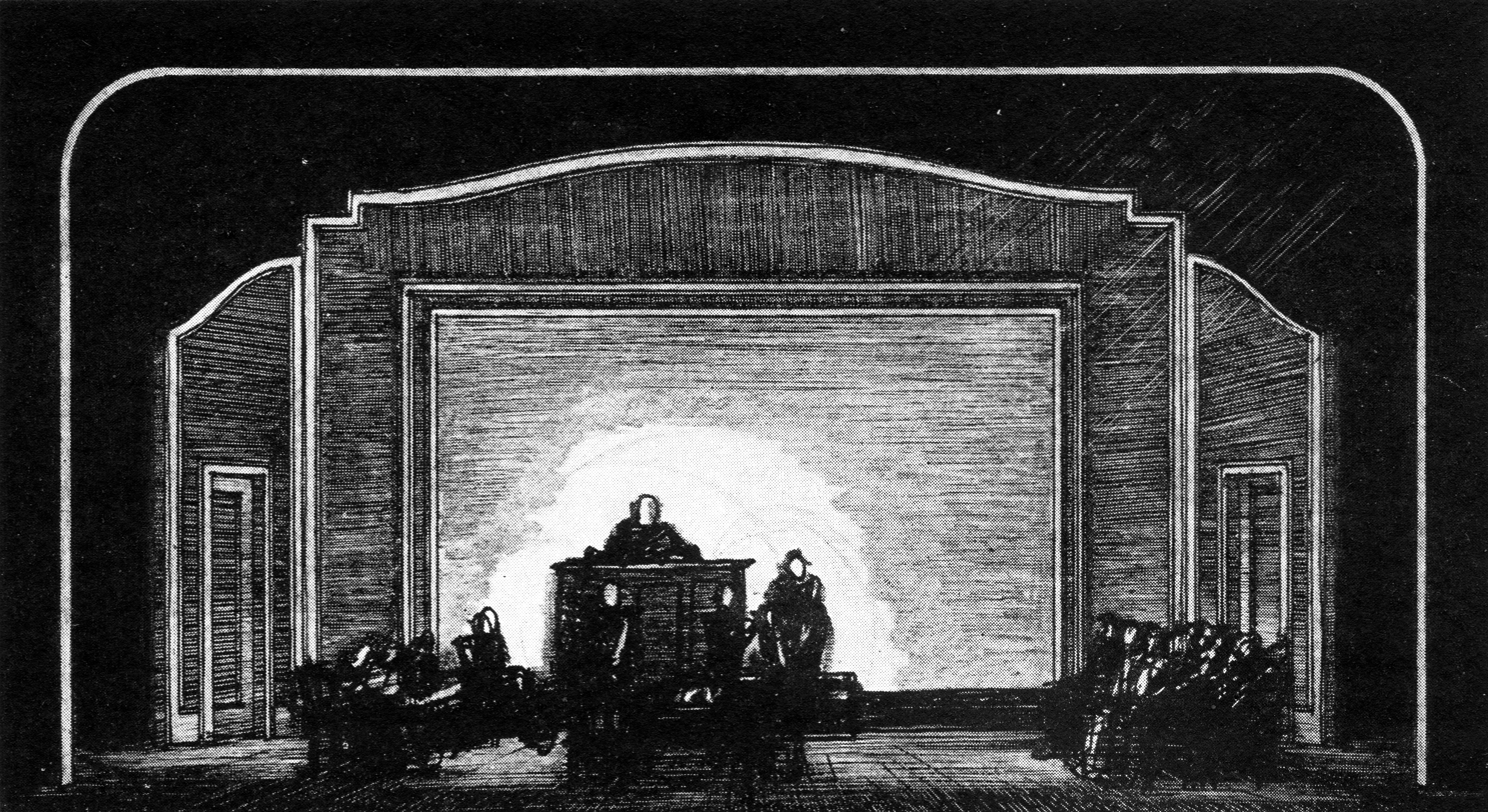
Set design by Robert Edmond Jones for the court room in Machinal

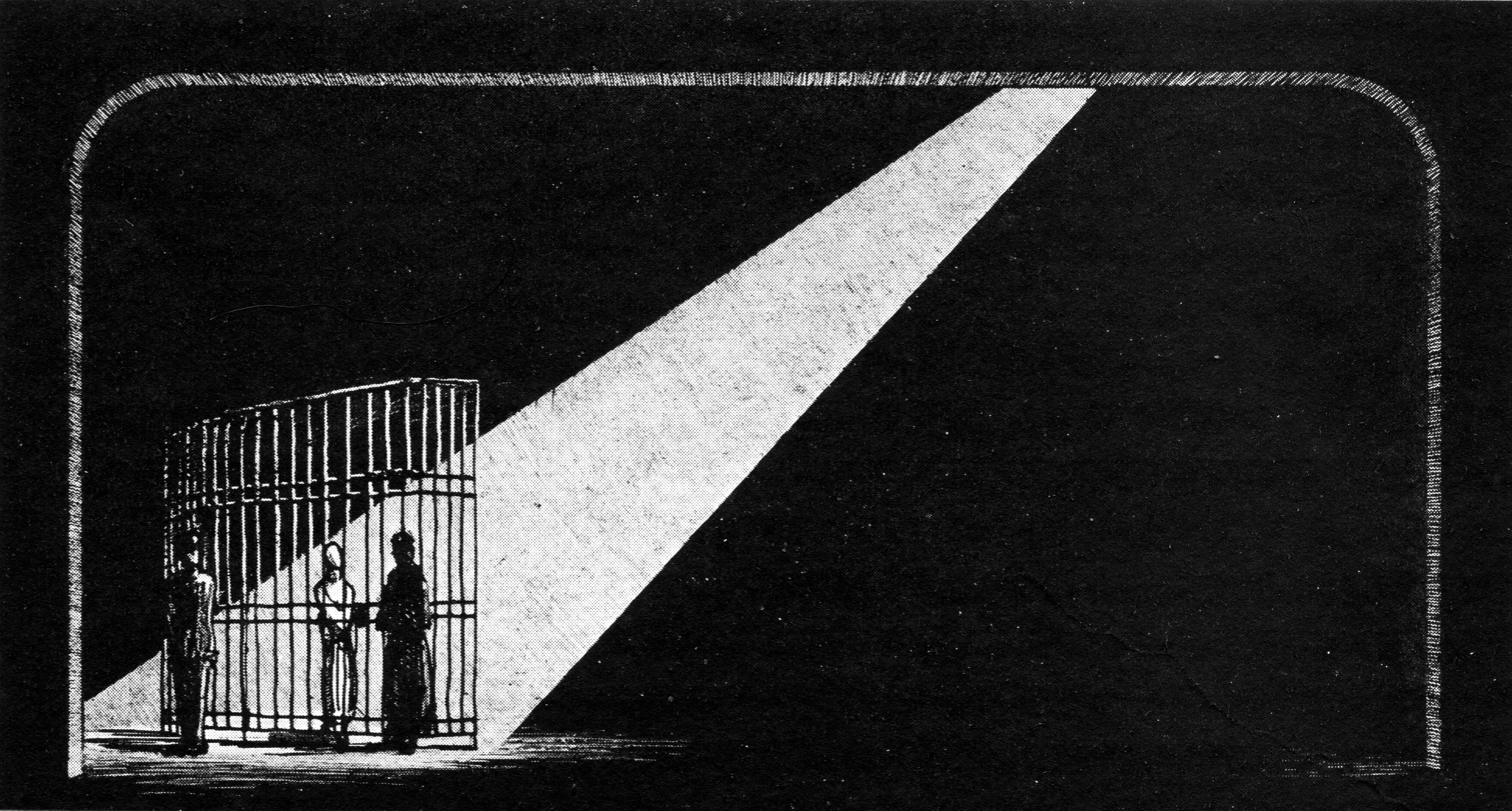
Set design by Robert Edmond Jones for the condemned woman's cell in Machinal

Produced and directed by Arthur Hopkins, Machinal opened on Broadway at the Plymouth Theatre on September 7, 1928, and closed on November 24, 1928, after 91 performances. The scenic design was by Robert Edmond Jones, who used an open stage with a permanent background and made scene changes primarily with lighting. The play is presented in two parts, with ten scenes in the first and four in the second. The production is notable for featuring Clark Gable in his Broadway debut.

=== Cast ===
- Zita Johann as A Young Woman
- Millicent Green as A Telephone Girl
- Grace Atwell as A Stenographer
- Leopold Badia as A Filing Clerk
- Conway Washburn as An Adding Clerk and A Reporter
- Jean Adair as A Mother
- George Stillwell as A Husband
- Otto Frederick as A Bellboy and A Court Reporter
- Nancy Allan as A Nurse
- Monroe Childs as A Doctor
- Hal K. Dawson as A Young Man and Third Reporter
- Zenaide Ziegfeld as A Girl
- Jess Sidney as A Man
- Clyde Stork as A Boy
- Clark Gable as A Man
- Hugh M. Hite as Another Man and Second Reporter
- John Hanley as A Waiter, A Bailiff and A Jailer
- Tom Waters as A Judge
- John Connery as A Lawyer for Defense
- James Macdonald as A Lawyer for Prosecution
- Mrs. Charles Willard as A Matron
- Charles Kennedy as A Priest

In Britain, the play was first performed under the title The Life Machine in 1931.

== Reception ==
"It was unfortunate that word was sent broadcast before the first performance of Machinal that its theme and characters grew out of the notorious Snyder-Gray murder case," wrote Perriton Maxwell, editor of Theatre Magazine. "The play bears no likeness to the sordid facts of that cheap tragedy...Machinal transcends the drab drama of the police court; it has a quality one finds it difficult to define, a beauty that cannot be conveyed in words, an aliveness and reality tinctured with poetic pathos which lift it to the realm of great art, greatly conceived and greatly presented." Calling Machinal "the most enthralling play of the year," Maxwell attributed the play's success to "three remarkable persons: Sophie Treadwell, Arthur Hopkins and Zita Johann."

"From the sordid mess of a brutal murder the author, actors and producer of Machinal … have with great skill managed to retrieve a frail and sombre beauty of character," wrote theatre critic Brooks Atkinson of The New York Times. "Subdued, monotonous, episodic, occasionally eccentric in its style, Machinal is fraught with a beauty unfamiliar to the stage." Atkinson describes the play as "the tragedy of one who lacks strength; she is not adaptable; she submits...Being the exposition of a character, stark and austere in style, Machinal makes no excuses for the tragedy it unfolds."

== Adaptations and later productions ==
The play has been revived many times since its original run.

Adapted for television by Irving Gaynor Neiman, Machinal was presented January 18, 1954, on NBC-TV's Robert Montgomery Presents. Reviewing the starring performance of Joan Lorring, Jack Gould of The New York Times wrote that "her interpretation of the mentally tortured young woman in Machinal, Sophie Treadwell's expressionistic and bitter poem for the theatre, must rank among the video season's finest accomplishments." The cast also included Malcolm Lee Beggs as the husband.

An adaptation of Machinal aired August 14, 1960, on ITV the United Kingdom in the ABC Armchair Theatre series. Joanna Dunham starred, with Donald Pleasence portraying the husband.

Program cover for the 1993 Royal National Theatre production

Machinal was produced Off-Broadway at the Gate Theatre, opening in April 1960, with direction by Gene Frankel, and featuring Delores Sutton, Vincent Gardenia, and Gerald O'Loughlin. In his review in The New York Times, Brooks Atkinson wrote "Gene Frankel has added modernistic details that visualize the inhumanity of the background... Ballou's cold settings, Lee Watson's macabre lighting complete the design of one of Off-Broadway's most vibrant performances."

The play was produced Off-Broadway by the New York Shakespeare Festival at the Public Theatre, running from September 25, 1990 to November 25, 1990. Directed by Michael Greif, the cast featured Jodie Markell (Young Woman), John Seitz (Husband), and Marge Redmond (Mother). The production won three Obie Awards: for Performance (Jodie Markell), Direction, and Design (John Gromada).

Machinal was revived by the Royal National Theatre in London in a production directed by Stephen Daldry. It opened on 15 October 1993 with Fiona Shaw as the Young Woman, Ciarán Hinds as the Man, and John Woodvine as the Husband. The scenic design, which included a large metal grid that moved into different positions for the play's different scenes, was by Ian MacNeil, costumes were by Clare Mitchell, lighting design was by Rick Fisher, with music by Stephen Warbeck.

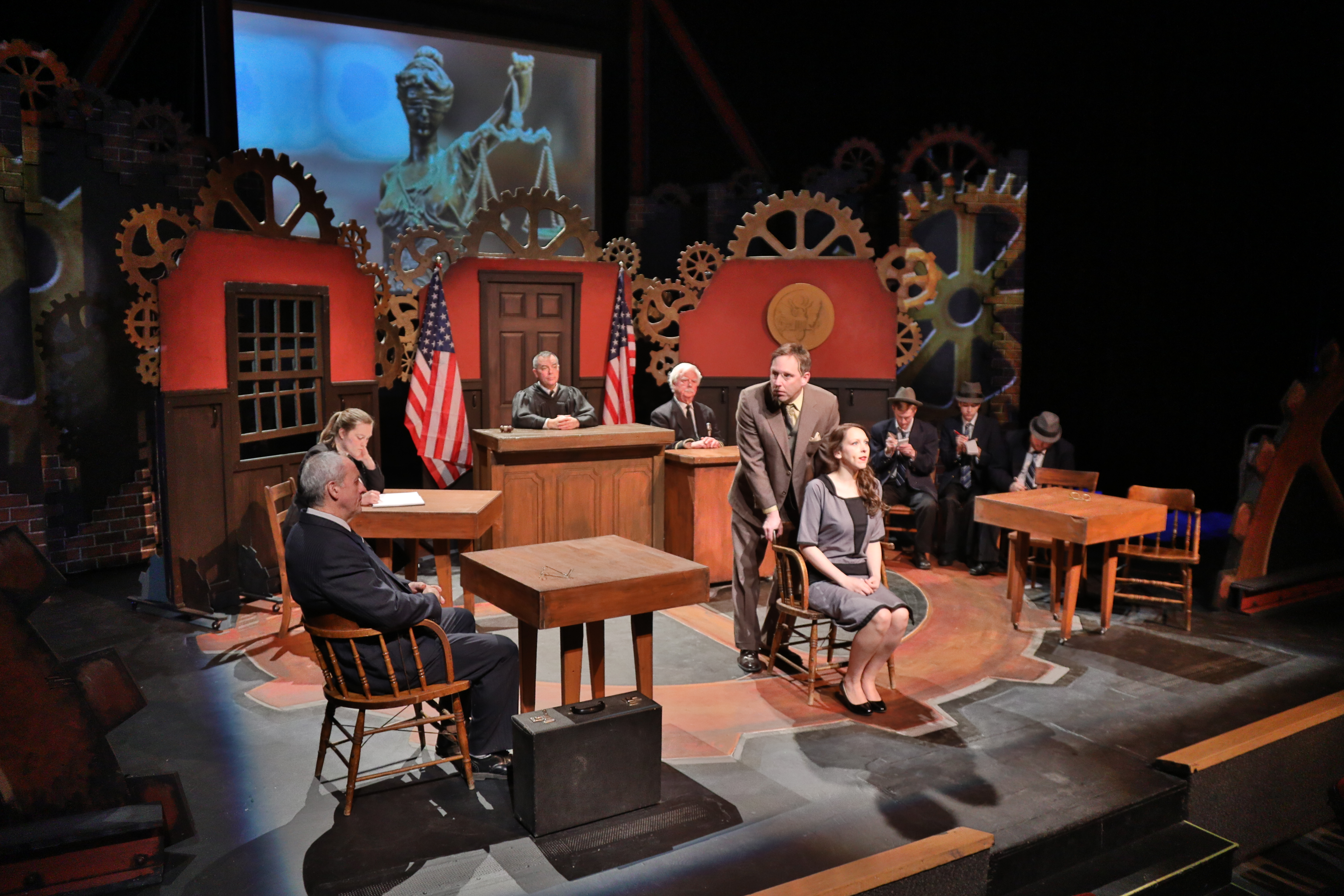
The court room Machinal by the Boardmore Theatre, Cape Breton University, 2019

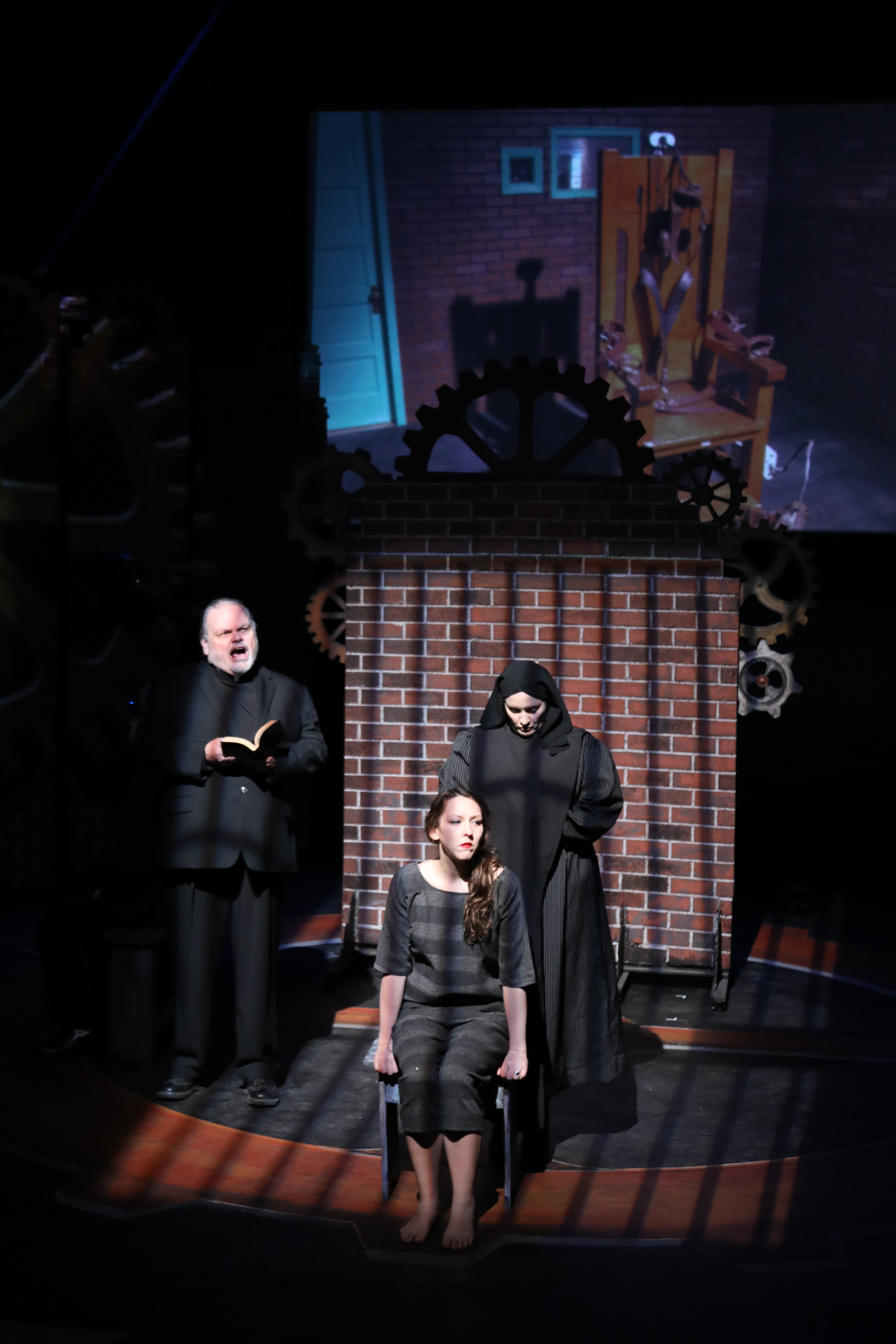
The condemned woman's cell in Machinal

A revival opened on Broadway in a Roundabout Theatre production at the American Airlines Theatre on January 16, 2014, directed by Lyndsey Turner, featuring Rebecca Hall, Michael Cumpsty, Suzanne Bertish and Morgan Spector.

A new production opened at the Almeida Theatre in London on June 4, 2018, directed by Natalie Abrahami.

The play has had college and university productions as well, most recently October 2026 productions at David Geffen School of Drama at Yale and at San Joaquin Delta College, preceded by a February 2025 production at Rutgers University-Camden and Johnson County Community College, and a 2019 production at Cape Breton University.

=== 2024 Theatre Royal Bath Revival ===
In 2024, Machinal underwent a revival by the Ustinov Studio of the Theatre Royal Bath. It ran periodically throughout the year in both London and Bath, its most prestigious venue at the 1,000 seat Old Vic Theatre in London, from 11 April-1 June 2024. The production garnered widespread praise, and was considered by some to be one of the best shows of the past several years. Critics called the main performance by actress Rosie Sheehy as Young Woman a highlight of the show and she was nominated for 2025's Laurence Olivier Award for Best Actress. The direction by Richard Jones, CBE, also attracted much admiration. The set by Hyemi Shin included harsh yellow backgrounds, and a large speaker which sat suspended above the stage. The episode Intimate was well-liked for its beginning in darkness, then a diegetic light growing slowly. Costume designs were by Nicky Gillibrand, lighting by Adam Silverman, sound by Benjamin Grant and casting by Ginny Schiller. The show was created in partnership with the Royal Bank of Canada, with support from the Arts Council England.

=== 2025 New York Theatre Company Engagement ===
In June 2025, Machinal was revived as an off-Broadway limited engagement. Launched nearly 100 years after the 1926 case of Ruth Snyder, this reimagined production amplified the mechanical rhythm and expressionism in Treadwell’s text through a dynamic underscoring of tap dance, practical foley, and heightened movement. The production, performed at New York City Center Stage II, starred Katherine Winter as the Young Woman, Sam Im as the Husband, Soph Metcalf as the Lover, and Alice Reys as the Defense Attorney. It was directed by Amy Marie Seidel, and choreographed by Madison Hilligoss. This marked the inaugural production of New York Theatre Company.

== Legacy ==
Machinal was included in Burns Mantle's The Best Plays of 1928–29.

In 2013, Machinal was included on Entertainment Weekly's list of the "50 Greatest Plays of the Past 100 Years".

In 2015, theatre critic Michael Billington included the play in his list of the "101 greatest plays" ever written in any western language.

In 2019, Machinal was named as one of the "40 best plays of all time" by The Independent.

In 2020, Machinal was included on BroadwayWorld's list of the "101 GREATEST PLAYS of the Past 100 Years".

Accolades

The Royal National Theatre production won three 1994 Laurence Olivier Awards, for Best Revival of a Play or Comedy, for Fiona Shaw as Best Actress and Stephen Daldry as Best Director of a Play. Ian MacNeil was nominated as Best Set Designer.

The 2014 Broadway production received four 2014 Tony Award nominations: Best Scenic Design of a Play (Es Devlin), Best Costume Design of a Play (Michael Krass), Best in Lighting Design of a Play (Jane Cox) and Best Sound Design of a Play (Matt Tierney).

The 2025 Off-Broadway Revival received 11 BroadwayWorld Off-Broadway Nominations: Best Production of a Play, Best Performance In A Play (Katherine Winter, Temidayo Amay, Sam Im & Alice Reys), Best Scenic Design (Rochele Mac), Best Sound Design (Brittany Harris), Best Costume Design (Hahnji Jang), Best Lighting Design (Colleen Doherty), Best Original Choreography (Madison Hilligoss) and Best Direction of a Play (Amy Marie Seidel).
