= Sophie Treadwell =

American playwright

Sophie Anita Treadwell
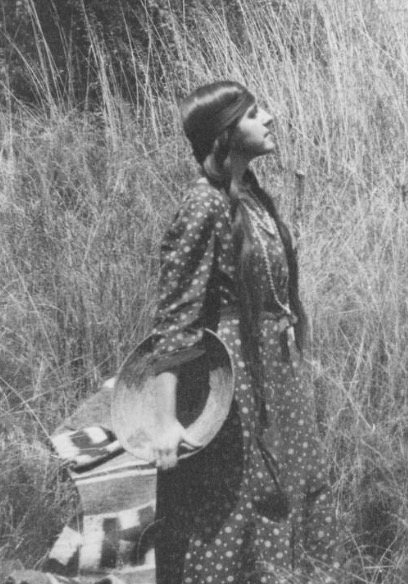
- Treadwell in 1916
- Born: Sophie Anita Treadwell; October 3, 1885; Stockton, California, U.S.
- Died: February 20, 1970 (aged 84); Tucson, Arizona, U.S.
- Spouse: W. O. McGeehan

Sophie Anita Treadwell (October 3, 1885 – February 20, 1970) was an American playwright and journalist of the first half of the 20th century. She is best known for her play Machinal which is often included in drama anthologies as an example of an expressionist or modernist play. Treadwell wrote dozens of plays, several novels, as well as serial stories and countless articles that appeared in newspapers. In addition to writing plays for the theatre, Treadwell also produced, directed and acted in some of her productions. The styles and subjects of Treadwell's writings are vast, but many present women's issues of her time, subjects of current media coverage, or aspects of Treadwell's Mexican heritage.

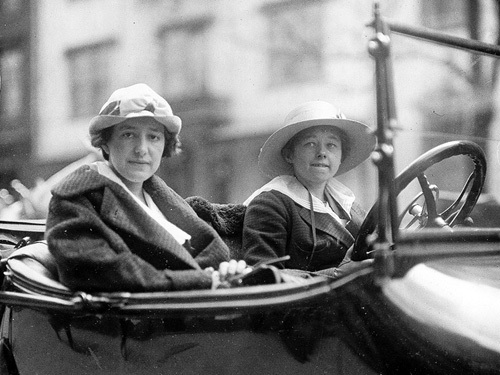
Sophie Treadwell on U.S. auto tour

== Heritage and childhood ==
Sophie Anita Treadwell was born in 1885 in Stockton, California. Between 1890 and 1891, Treadwell's father, Alfred Treadwell, deserted her and her mother, Nettie Fairchild Treadwell, and moved to San Francisco. Although Treadwell originally excelled at school, after her father left she struggled, which others have attributed to the frequency with which she and her mother relocated. While Treadwell primarily lived with her mother, occasionally Treadwell spent summers in San Francisco with her father. During these visits, Treadwell was first exposed to theatre; she witnessed famous actresses Helena Modjeska and Sarah Bernhardt in The Merchant of Venice and Phèdre, respectively. In 1902, Treadwell and her mother moved to San Francisco.

Although Treadwell's father was also born in Stockton, he spent most of his formative years in Mexico with his native-born mother. Both Treadwell's paternal grandmother and great-grandmother were Mexican women of Spanish descent. Treadwell's father had a Catholic education, and he was fluent in five languages. Treadwell's strong female role model was her grandmother Anna Gray Fairchild, a Scottish immigrant, who managed the family's large ranch in Stockton after the death of her husband. Traces of Treadwell's heritage, both Mexican and European, can be gleaned from her works, as can references to her parents' troubled marriage and her time spent at the ranch in Stockton.

== University and early career ==
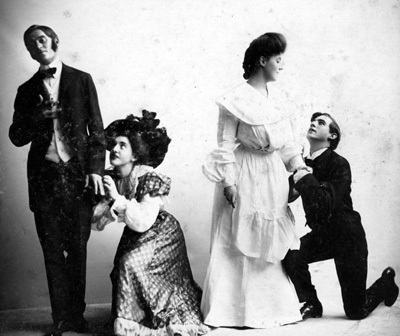
Treadwell at UC Berkeley

Treadwell received her Bachelor of Letters in French from the University of California at Berkeley, where she studied from 1902 to 1906. At Berkeley, Treadwell became very involved with the school's extracurricular drama and journalism activities, serving as the college's correspondent for The San Francisco Examiner. Due to financial pressure, Treadwell had to work several jobs during her studies; receiving additional training in shorthand and typing, teaching English as a second language in the evenings, as well as working in the circulation department of the San Francisco Call. It was during this time that she first began to write; early drafts of shorter plays, songs, and short fictional stories. During college, Treadwell had her first brushes with mental illness, a variety of nervous conditions that would plague her and lead to several extended hospitalizations throughout her life.

After college, Treadwell moved to Los Angeles where she worked for a brief time as a vaudeville singer. She then studied acting and was mentored by renowned Polish actress Helena Modjeska, whose memoirs she was hired to write in 1908. In 1910, Treadwell married William O. McGeehan, better known as 'Mac', a beloved sports writer for the San Francisco Bulletin.

== New York ==
In 1915, Treadwell moved to New York, following her husband who had already made the cross-country move for his career. In New York, Treadwell joined the Lucy Stone League of suffragists. Treadwell participated in a 150-mile march with the League, which delivered a petition on women's suffrage to the legislature of New York. Treadwell maintained a separate residence from her husband, an idea encouraged by the League. Her marriage was said to be one of mutual independence and acceptance of differing interests.

In New York, Treadwell befriended and became associated with many well known modernist personalities and modern artists of the time, notably Louise and Walter Arensberg who ran a New York Salon, and painter Marcel Duchamp. Congruous with Treadwell's advocacy for sexual independence, birth control rights, and increased sexual freedom for women, Treadwell had a brief affair with the artist Maynard Dixon between 1916 and 1919.

Treadwell reached the peak of her professional career in journalism and in theatre in New York in the 1920s. Treadwell attended lectures and completed an extensive study with Richard Boleslavsky of the Moscow Art Theatre which proved to be both influential and motivational for Treadwell's varied theatrical pursuits. Treadwell underwent media controversy in the mid-20s for a drawn out dispute with the famous John Barrymore; Barrymore attempted to produce a play about Edgar Allan Poe supposedly written by his wife Michael Strange, which borrowed heavily from a manuscript that Treadwell had written and shared with him years prior. Treadwell brought a lawsuit against Barrymore for stoppage of the play and won, although she was criticized heavily in the media.

Treadwell lectured and advocated openly for authors rights and was the first American playwright to win royalty payments for a play production from the Soviet Union. In addition to her accomplishments, Treadwell traveled often with 'Mac' across the United States, Europe, and Northern Africa. Treadwell's husband died in 1933 due to heart complications, while they were on vacation in the state of Georgia.

== Broadway ==
Treadwell set herself apart from many female writers of her day, by pursuing commercial productions of her works on Broadway. Seven of Treadwell's plays, listed below, appeared on the Great White Way between 1922 and 1941. Gringo was Treadwell's first play to be produced on Broadway. Most of these plays were only written by Treadwell, but she also produced Lone Valley and O, Nightingale, the later of which she even staged. New York became the setting for the majority of Treadwell's plays.

- Gringo
- O Nightingale
- Machinal
- Ladies Leave
- Lone Valley
- Plumes in the Dust
- Hope for a Harvest

Critics often negatively judged Treadwell's plays as having poorly developed plots, unsympathetic characters, or objectionable themes. Treadwell was also known for having tense relationships with producers because she was reluctant to accept their feedback and edit her work.

== Later years ==
In the 1950s and 60s, Treadwell turned to writing mostly fiction in the form of short stories and novels, which may be influenced by the lack of success from her Broadway ventures. Treadwell lived for a time as an expatriate in Vienna, Austria as well as in Torremolinos in Southern Spain. When Sophie returned to the U.S. she lived in Newtown, Connecticut and spent time in Mexico and Stockton. In 1949, Treadwell adopted a young German boy, whom she named William. She retired in the mid-60s to Tucson, Arizona, where she spent her final years. After a brief hospital stay, Treadwell died on February 20, 1970.

== Plays and novels ==
Treadwell is credited with writing at least 39 plays, numerous serials and journalistic articles, short stories, and several novels. The subjects of her writings are as diverse as the mediums she was writing in. Many of Treadwell's works are difficult to obtain and only seven of her plays have ever been produced.

Many of Treadwell's plays follow the traditional late nineteenth century well-made play structure, but some share the more modern style and feminist concerns Treadwell is known for, including her often anthologized Machinal. Although Treadwell's plays primarily feature lead female characters, the women presented vary greatly in their behavior, beliefs, and social status. Some of Treadwell's plays contain hints of autobiography from Treadwell's heritage to her extra-marital affair. Below is a chronological chart of her known works.

=== Plays and novels ===
Title	Year	Background
A Man's Own	1905	one-act written when Treadwell was only 20 years old; this play is set in an office in Chicago and concerns economics and family matters
Le Grand Prix	1907	Treadwell's first full-length play
The Right Man	1908	
The Settlement	1911	unpublished
The High Cost	1911	begun in 1908 under the title Constance Darrow
An Unwritten Chapter	1915	a one-act later renamed Sympathy, it is a stage adaptation of the serial How I Got My Husband and How I Lost Him. Sympathy was the first of Treadwell's plays to be produced. This 3-character one-act is set in an apartment and the characters are Jean Traig, a performer, Mori, her servant, and a Man; the play has romantic and economic themes.
Guess Again	1915–1918	2-character one-act romance set in a New York apartment
To Him who Waits	1915–1918	one-act
His Luck	1915–1918	one-act
La Cachucha	1915–1918	one-act set in a NY apartment and the characters are dancer Senorita Viviana Ybarra y De La Guerra, businessman John S. Watkins, and musician Senor Alvaredos. The subject matter of the play is both domestic and romantic
John Doane	1915–1918	a one-act, featuring six characters with an abstract setting and family, romantic, and social subject matter
Claws	1916–1918	Treadwell wrote, produced, and acted in this play's first production
Trance	1918	3-character comedic one-act set in a house London, England. The subject is listed as family and the characters are Madame de Vere, Charlie, and John Randolphe
Madame Bluff	1918	Comedy
The Answer	1918	3-act, 6-character play set in an apartment in New York City. The subject matter of the play is war and domestic matters and several of the characters in the play represent military personnel
The Eye of the Beholder	1919	one-act, previously titled Mrs. Wayne. Treadwell copyrighted this drama in 1919, a historical accolade for a female playwright at this time. This 7-character drama is set in a rural house and the play's subject matter revolves around family matters and romance. Produced in 2007 at The American Century Theater in Arlington, VA
Rights	1921	based on the life of Mary Wollstonecraft
Gringo	1922	Ran on Broadway December 1922-January 1923, this 3-act drama is set in a mine and camp in Mexico and is loaded with subject matter of: violence, interracial romance (white and Hispanic), family, and intellectual matters. Occupations listed for this 20-character play include: journalist, miner, servant, homemaker, criminal, laborer, and musician. Treadwell drew heavily from her recent interview with Pancho Villa for the content of this play.
O Nightingale	1925	a comedy, originally titled Loney Lee starred Helen Hayes and ran on Broadway April 1925-May 1925. Treadwell also produced the shows transfer to Broadway and played a supporting role onstage under the pseudonym Constance Elliot.
Machinal	1928	titled The Life Machine in the London premiere, premiered on Broadway September 1928-November 1928 and was revived on Broadway January 2014-March 2014. The story of Machinal is told over 9 scenes by 29 identifies characters. Six distinct settings appear in the play: office, house, hotel, hospital, bar, courtroom, prison, The main character in the play is the 'young woman,' played in the 2014 Broadway production by Rebecca Hall. None of the characters are named, but identified by their station or occupation. The story is loosely based on the murder trial of Ruth Snyder. This play has been revived off Broadway and on television and is, by far, Treadwell's best known work.
Ladies Leave	1929	a comedy, ran on Broadway in October 1929. A 6 character play in 3-acts that is set in a NYC apartment which deals with the subjects of family, domestic, and social matter, as well as romance. Occupations represented in the play include doctor, servant, publisher, and editor
The Island	1930	A comedy set in rural Mexico with subject matter of mostly romantic and socially centered content. A writer, servant, and military personnel are represented among the eight characters in the play
Lusita	1931	A novel with a focus on Women in the Mexican Revolution, informed by Treadwell's interview with Pancho Villa almost a decade prior.
Lone Valley	1933	written, staged, and produced by Treadwell, ran on Broadway March 1933, after six years of work-shopping and edits by Treadwell
Intimations For Saxophone	1934	Produced in 2004 at Arena Stage in Washington, D.C.
Plumes in the Dust	1936	ran on Broadway in November 1936 starring Henry Hull portraying Edgar Allan Poe
Hope for a Harvest	1941	An unpublished novel and a play; the play was later adapted for TV broadcast in 1953. Harvest was Treadwell's last play to premier on Broadway during her lifetime, it ran November–December 1941 at the Guild Theatre featuring Fredric March and Florence Eldridge. The genre is noted as drama, and the play is set in a rural house in San Joaquin Valley, California. There are 17 characters in the play and the subjects range from economics and social issues, to family and romance. This play is largely autobiographical, and discusses the loss of the American work ethic and problems of racism during World War II. The attack on Pearl Harbor just ten days after Harvest's opening, is believed to have severely affected American audiences' ability to sympathize with the plays message, leading to the play closing shortly thereafter.
Highway	1944	A 2-act comedy set in a restaurant in rural Texas. The play features 16 characters of white, Hispanic, and American Indian races with a myriad of occupations with subject matter ranging from economics and family, to health and romance. Highway was produced originally in Pasadena, California, and remade for television broadcast in the mid-50s.
The Last Border	1944	this play is set in the federal district of Mexico City, and the 13 characters are White or Hispanic. The play's subjects include violence, romance, and social issues
Judgement in the Morning	1952	A 3-act play set both on the Upper East and Upper West Sides of New York City, with a multiracial cast who portray a range of socioeconomically divided characters from a lawyer and politician—to a laborer and a criminal
Gary	1954	A 2-act drama set in an Upper West Side apartment in New York City including topics of socioeconomic and family matters, romance, and violence . The four character are labeled as Wilma a laborer, Peggy a prostitute, Garry a criminal, and Dave a journalist; the abstract notes that the characters feature both heterosexual and bisexual orientations The world Premiere of this play will be presented at the White Bear Theatre in London from June 4–22, 2019.
One Fierce Hour and Sweet	1956	A novel published by Appleton-Century-Crofts
Woman with Lilies	1967	Treadwell's final play, produced under the title Now He Doesn't Want to Play at the University of Arizona.

== Journalism ==
Treadwell's first job as a journalist was with the San Francisco Bulletin, where she was hired in 1908 as a feature writer and theatre critic. She interviewed celebrities, such as Jack London, and covered several high-profile murder trials. Later, when living in New York, Treadwell covered the murder trials of Ruth Snyder and Judd Gray whose stories influenced subsequent plays. Treadwell also wrote two popular serial stories for the Bulletin, one based on Treadwell's under cover research about charity available to women in need for which Treadwell disguised herself as a homeless prostitute, the other was a fiction titled How I Got My Husband and How I Lost Him which provided the source material for her later play Sympathy.

Treadwell traveled to France to cover the First World War; she was the only female foreign correspondent writing from overseas at that time, accredited by the State Department. Because Treadwell was not permitted access to the front lines, she volunteered as a nurse and focused her writing on the effect the war was having on the women in Europe. In 1915, Harper's Weekly published her feature "Women in Black".

When Sophie returned to New York, she was hired by the New York American, later renamed New York Herald Tribune where she wrote as a journalist and served as an expert on Mexican-American relations and Mexico. In 1920, Sophie covered the end of the Mexican Revolution and wrote a front page piece on the flight of Mexican President Don Venustiano Carranza. In 1921, she was the only foreign journalist permitted to interview Pancho Villa. That two-day interview gained Treadwell notoriety in the journalism field as well as provided a basis for Sophie's first Broadway play Gringo and her later novel Lusita. In 1941, Sophie spent 10 months in Mexico City as a correspondent for the Tribune. Years later, Treadwell wrote for the Tribune about her visit to post-war Germany.

== Contemporaries and context ==
Although Treadwell was writing during the height of the Little Theatre Movement in the United States, her desire to produce her works on Broadway for mainstream audiences set her apart from her contemporaries. Treadwell was only peripherally involved in the movement through her work at the Provincetown Players during their early existence.

Noteworthy women playwrights writing in the same era as Treadwell are:

- Zoe Akins
- Djuna Barnes
- Rachel Crothers
- Zona Gale
- Alice Gerstenberg
- Susan Glaspell
- Georgia Douglas Johnson
- Edna St. Vincent Millay
- Gertrude Stein

Through the use of various 'isms' these playwrights explored new and alternative ways of presenting women's lives in their plays.

Treadwell remained widely unknown and un-talked about in the world of theatre scholarship until select feminist scholars resuscitated interest in her works following revivals of Machinal in 1990 by the New York Shakespeare Festival and in 1993 by the Royal National Theatre in London.

== Resources and further reading ==
The majority of Treadwell's works are stored at the University of Arizona Library Special Collections and the rest at The Billy Rose Theatre Collection at the New York Public Library. The rights to Treadwell's works were passed on in her will to the Roman Catholic Diocese of Tucson: A Corporation Sole. One who wishes to obtain the rights to Treadwell's plays can address an enquiry to: Fiscal and Administrative Services, Diocese of Tucson, PO Box 31, Tucson, AZ 85702. Proceeds earned from the production or printing of Treadwell's works are used to benefit Native American children in Arizona.

Further biographical information and critical analysis about Treadwell may be found in:

- "Broadway's Bravest Woman: Selected Writings of Sophie Treadwell". Edited and with introductions by Jerry Dickey and Miriam Lopez-Rodiriguez. Southern Illinois University Press, 2006.
- "Susan Glaspell and Sophie Treadwell". Barbara Ozieblo and Jerry Dickey. Routledge, 2008.
- Dickey, Jerry (1999). "The expressionist movement: Sophie Treadwell". In Murphy, Brenda (ed.). The Cambridge Companion to American Women Playwrights. Cambridge University Press. pp. 66–81. ISBN 9780521576802.

All of Treadwell's plays are published electronically in "North American Women's Drama" through the academic database publisher Alexander Street Press. Access to this resource is available by purchase directly through ASP's website, or through library access at many academic institutions that have purchased a license to the database.

In addition, Machinal is (or was) included in the following anthologies:

- Twenty-Five Best Plays of the Modern American Theatre by John Glassner- now out of print, originally published in 1949
- Plays by American Women: 1900–1930 Judith Barlow's anthology, published in 1981
- Norton Anthology of Drama
- North American women's Drama
- The Routledge Drama Anthology and Sourcebook
- Plays and performance texts by women 1880-1930 Manchester University Press
