= List of worst Major League Baseball season win–loss records =

Listed below are the Major League Baseball teams with the worst season won-lost records, as determined by win percentage (.300 or less), minimum 120 games played.

== Season records ==
The following teams finished the season with a .300 winning percentage or lower.

Legend

- NL = National League
- AL = American League
- AA = American Association
- PL = Players' League

=== 1886–1900 ===
| Season | Franchise | League | Wins | Losses | Pct. | GB | Games played |
|---|---|---|---|---|---|---|---|
| 1899 | Cleveland Spiders | NL | 20 | 134 | .130 | 84 | 154 |
| 1890 | Pittsburgh Alleghenys | NL | 23 | 113 | .169 | 66½ | 136 |
| 1889 | Louisville Colonels | AA | 27 | 111 | .196 | 67½ | 138 |
| 1897 | St. Louis Browns | NL | 29 | 102 | .221 | 63½ | 131 |
| 1886 | Washington Nationals | NL | 28 | 92 | .233 | 60 | 120 |
| 1886 | Kansas City Cowboys | NL | 30 | 91 | .248 | 58½ | 121 |
| 1898 | St. Louis Browns | NL | 39 | 111 | .260 | 63½ | 150 |
| 1895 | Louisville Colonels | NL | 35 | 96 | .267 | 52½ | 131 |
| 1890 | Buffalo Bisons | PL | 36 | 96 | .273 | 46½ | 132 |
| 1894 | Louisville Colonels | NL | 36 | 94 | .277 | 54 | 130 |
| 1896 | Louisville Colonels | NL | 38 | 93 | .290 | 53 | 131 |
| 1887 | Indianapolis Hoosiers | NL | 37 | 89 | .294 | 43 | 126 |
| 1895 | St. Louis Browns | NL | 39 | 93 | .295 | 48½ | 132 |
| 1887 | Cleveland Blues | AA | 39 | 92 | .298 | 54 | 131 |

=== Modern era (1901–present) ===
| Season | Franchise | League | Wins | Losses | Pct. | GB | Games played |
|---|---|---|---|---|---|---|---|
| 1916 | Philadelphia Athletics | AL | 36 | 117 | .235 | 54½ | 153 |
| 1935 | Boston Braves | NL | 38 | 115 | .248 | 67 | 153 |
| 1962 | New York Mets | NL | 40 | 120 | .250 | 60 | 160 |
| 1904 | Washington Senators | AL | 38 | 113 | .252 | 55½ | 151 |
| 2024 | Chicago White Sox | AL | 41 | 121 | .253 | 51½ | 162 |
| 1919 | Philadelphia Athletics | AL | 36 | 104 | .257 | 52 | 140 |
| 2003 | Detroit Tigers | AL | 43 | 119 | .265 | 47 | 162 |
| 2025 | Colorado Rockies | NL | 43 | 119 | .265 | 50 | 162 |
| 1952 | Pittsburgh Pirates | NL | 42 | 112 | .273 | 54½ | 154 |
| 1909 | Washington Senators | AL | 42 | 110 | .276 | 56 | 152 |
| 1942 | Philadelphia Phillies | NL | 42 | 109 | .278 | 62½ | 151 |
| 1939 | St. Louis Browns | AL | 43 | 111 | .279 | 64½ | 154 |
| 1932 | Boston Red Sox | AL | 43 | 111 | .279 | 64 | 154 |
| 1941 | Philadelphia Phillies | NL | 43 | 111 | .279 | 57 | 154 |
| 1915 | Philadelphia Athletics | AL | 43 | 109 | .283 | 58½ | 152 |
| 1928 | Philadelphia Phillies | NL | 43 | 109 | .283 | 51 | 152 |
| 2018 | Baltimore Orioles | AL | 47 | 115 | .290 | 61 | 162 |
| 1911 | Boston Rustlers | NL | 44 | 107 | .291 | 54 | 151 |
| 2019 | Detroit Tigers | AL | 47 | 114 | .292 | 54 | 161 |
| 1909 | Boston Doves | NL | 45 | 108 | .294 | 65½ | 153 |
| 1911 | St. Louis Browns | AL | 45 | 107 | .296 | 56½ | 152 |
| 1939 | Philadelphia Phillies | NL | 45 | 106 | .298 | 50½ | 151 |
| 1937 | St. Louis Browns | AL | 46 | 108 | .299 | 56 | 154 |
| 1945 | Philadelphia Phillies | NL | 46 | 108 | .299 | 52 | 154 |
| 1938 | Philadelphia Phillies | NL | 45 | 105 | .300 | 43 | 150 |

== 1899 Cleveland Spiders ==
The 1899 Cleveland Spiders own the worst single-season record of all time (minimum 120 games) and for all eras, finishing at 20–134 (.130 percentage) in the final year of the National League's 12-team era in the 1890s; for comparison, this projects to 21–141 under the current 162-game schedule, and Pythagorean expectation based on the Spiders' results and the current 162-game schedule predicts a record of 24–138.

The Spiders were somewhat successful in the 1890s, with seven straight winning seasons from 1892 to 1898 and a Temple Cup victory in 1895, while the once four-time American Association champion St. Louis Browns had fallen to 29–102 in 1897 (11–61 on the road) and to 39–111 (19–67 on the road) in 1898. The Spiders ownership, the Robison brothers, bought the Browns in time for the 1899 season, creating a conflict-of-interest situation which was later outlawed, and on the eve of the season, traded almost all of Cleveland's star players to St. Louis for very little in return, with respectable results for St. Louis and disastrous results for Cleveland.

The 1899 Spiders set the major league record for most consecutive losses in a season (24, from July 26 to September 16), and had six losing streaks of 10 games or more. The Spiders lost 40 of their last 41 games, finishing 84 games behind the 1899 National League champion Brooklyn Superbas and 35 games behind the second-last-placed Washington Senators. They also lost 27 games in September, a record for the most games lost in a month until the 1909 Washington Senators went 5–29 in July.

Due to paltry attendances, the Spiders played 112 games on the road, finishing with a road record of 11–101 (the 101 road losses is a record which is unbreakable under the current MLB scheduling rules, which allow a maximum of 81 road games). The 112 road games was considered approachable only on one occasion: in 1994 when the Seattle Mariners had to play their remaining 118 games on the road due to ceiling damage at the Kingdome until the strike ended the season with Seattle having only played 68 games, but is otherwise also unbreakable under the current schedule.

The 1899 Browns, renamed the "Perfectos" and staffed with all the best players from the 1898 Spiders (six of the Spiders' eight starting position players, and four starting pitchers, including the great Cy Young) improved by 44½ games, from 39–111 to 84–67. However, all St. Louis ultimately did was trade places with Cleveland in the standings. The Browns/Perfectos were renamed the St. Louis Cardinals in 1900 (a name they haven't changed since), and are unrelated to the American League St. Louis Browns that adopted the discarded nickname and also appear on this list.

After the 1899 season, the National League contracted from twelve to eight clubs for the 1900 season, with the Spiders, the original Baltimore Orioles, Louisville Colonels (neither Louisville, nor the entire state of Kentucky, has had another major professional sports team since), and the original Washington Senators folding operations. Baltimore had also been stripped of its best players by Brooklyn in 1899, to somewhat less dramatic effect, but still enough to speed their demise.

The downsized 1900 National League allowed the Western League to fulfill its dreams of becoming a major league, filling the void in a number of cities by renaming itself the American League in 1900, and declaring itself a major league in 1901.

== Pre-1886 teams ==
With shorter schedules before 1886, it was much more common for teams to finish with sub-.300 winning percentages, as there was less of the evening-out effect of a longer season, and some seasons had a number of teams finish with such records, with nine in 1884 alone (between the three leagues that year).

In the list below (minimum 15 games played), four teams finished with worse overall winning percentages than the 1899 Spiders, but these teams played in leagues whose status as "major" is questionable: three of these occurred in the National Association (its status as a major league has long been disputed), and the other occurred in the Union Association (conventionally listed as a major league, but this status has been questioned due to the league's overall lack of playing talent and poor organizational structure).

Further to this, contemporary baseball guides did not consider the Union Association to be a major league, with the earliest record referencing the Union Association as a major league dating to 1922.

Legend

- NA = National Association
- NL = National League
- AA = American Association
- UA = Union Association

| Season | Franchise | League | Wins | Losses | Pct. | GB | Games played |
|---|---|---|---|---|---|---|---|
| 1875 | Brooklyn Atlantics | NA | 2 | 42 | .045 | 51½ | 44 |
| 1873 | Elizabeth Resolutes | NA | 2 | 21 | .087 | 23 | 23 |
| 1872 | Brooklyn Eckfords | NA | 3 | 26 | .103 | 27 | 29 |
| 1884 | Wilmington Quicksteps | UA | 2 | 16 | .111 | 44½ | 18 |
| 1876 | Cincinnati Reds | NL | 9 | 56 | .138 | 42½ | 65 |
| 1875 | New Haven Elm Citys | NA | 7 | 40 | .149 | 48 | 47 |
| 1871 | Rockford Forest Citys | NA | 4 | 21 | .160 | 15½ | 25 |
| 1883 | Philadelphia Quakers | NL | 17 | 81 | .173 | 46 | 98 |
| 1875 | Washington Nationals | NA | 5 | 23 | .179 | 40½ | 28 |
| 1884 | Washington Nationals | AA | 12 | 51 | .190 | 41 | 63 |
| 1874 | Baltimore Canaries | NA | 9 | 38 | .191 | 31½ | 47 |
| 1884 | Kansas City Cowboys | UA | 16 | 63 | .203 | 61 | 79 |
| 1873 | Washington Blue Legs | NA | 8 | 31 | .205 | 25 | 39 |
| 1875 | St. Louis Red Stockings | NA | 4 | 15 | .211 | 37 | 19 |
| 1882 | Worcester Worcesters | NL | 18 | 66 | .214 | 37 | 84 |
| 1876 | Philadelphia Athletics | NL | 14 | 45 | .237 | 34½ | 59 |
| 1884 | Altoona Mountain Citys | UA | 6 | 19 | .240 | 44 | 25 |
| 1878 | Milwaukee Grays | NL | 15 | 45 | .250 | 26 | 60 |
| 1884 | Detroit Wolverines | NL | 28 | 84 | .250 | 56 | 112 |
| 1879 | Troy Trojans | NL | 19 | 56 | .253 | 35½ | 75 |
| 1882 | Baltimore Orioles | AA | 19 | 54 | .260 | 32½ | 73 |
| 1880 | Cincinnati Stars | NL | 21 | 59 | .263 | 44 | 80 |
| 1877 | Cincinnati Reds | NL | 15 | 42 | .263 | 25½ | 57 |
| 1884 | Indianapolis Hoosiers | AA | 29 | 78 | .271 | 46 | 107 |
| 1884 | Pittsburgh Allghenys | AA | 30 | 78 | .278 | 45½ | 108 |
| 1884 | Richmond Virginians | AA | 12 | 30 | .286 | 30½ | 42 |
| 1883 | Baltimore Orioles | AA | 28 | 68 | .292 | 37 | 96 |
| 1880 | Buffalo Bisons | NL | 24 | 58 | .293 | 42 | 82 |

== Other teams 1886–present ==
The 1889 Colonels finished 9–65 on the road, and their .122 road winning percentage is the third lowest in MLB history for a minimum of 60 games.

The 1890 Alleghenys were gutted before the season when nearly all of their best players defected to the Pittsburgh Burghers of the Players' League. Poor attendances meant that they played 97 of their 136 games on the road, finishing with a road record of 9–88: the 88 road losses remained a record until 1899, and is unreachable under current MLB scheduling rules, with the Alleghenys' .093 road winning percentage being the lowest in MLB history for a minimum of 60 games.

The Philadelphia Athletics were a dominant team in the early 1910s, winning American League pennants in 1910, 1911, 1913 and 1914 and the World Series in 1910, 1911 and 1913. However, owner-manager Connie Mack felt that he was unable to pay his star players' salaries while the Federal League was in operation, and he sold or traded most of them after the 1914 World Series, in which the A's were upset by the Boston Braves in a 4-game sweep. The Athletics then finished in last place from 1915 to 1922. In 1916, they went 36–117, including 13–64 on the road. The 1916 Athletics' .235 winning percentage is the sixth-lowest of any MLB team and the lowest since 1900, along with their .170 road winning percentage.

The 1935 Boston Braves featured Hall of Famers Rabbit Maranville (age 43) and Babe Ruth (age 40). Braves owner Emil Fuchs had promised Ruth an ownership stake in the Braves and a chance to manage the club in the near future but had little intention of delivering either. Ruth retired on June 1, 1935, having hit .181 in 72 at-bats for the Braves, with six home runs (the last three all coming on the same day, May 25, 1935, at Pittsburgh). Fuchs, who had been plagued by financial problems for a decade, was forced to give up control of the Braves before the end of the season. The Braves' home winning percentage of .167 is the fifth-lowest of any MLB team and the lowest since 1900. The Braves finished the season 67 games out of first place, the record in both the modern era and the pre-1901 years.

The 1962 New York Mets were an expansion team created to fill the void after the New York Giants and Brooklyn Dodgers left New York City at the end of the 1957 season. The Mets, filled with castoffs like "Marvelous" Marv Throneberry as well as aging Hall of Famer Richie Ashburn and low-talent rookies such as Choo-Choo Coleman, finished 40–120, the fourth-worst winning percentage (.250) and the second-most losses in the modern era. The Mets went on to finish last or next-to-last for seven years in a row before they shocked the baseball world by winning the 1969 World Series.

The 2003 Detroit Tigers stood at 38–118 after 156 games, but won five of their last six games. On September 27, in their penultimate game, the Tigers came back from an 8–0 deficit to beat the Minnesota Twins 9–8. When the Tigers won the season finale to avoid tying the record, they received a standing ovation from the crowd. Mike Maroth, a starting pitcher for that Tigers team, went 9–21 and became the first pitcher to lose 20 games in a season since Brian Kingman dropped 20 games for the 1980 Oakland Athletics. Ramón Santiago became only the 12th Triple Crown loser (a player who finishes last in all of the three Triple Crown categories) in modern MLB history. One baseball statistician described the Tigers as possibly "the worst team of all time without a good excuse", as virtually every other team on the list had been effectively reduced to minor-league status, was plagued by financial problems, or was a first-year expansion team. Only three years later, however, the Tigers would win the American League pennant, but lose in the World Series to the St. Louis Cardinals.

The 2018 Baltimore Orioles were the first team since the 2003 Tigers to win fewer than 50 games and finished 61 games behind the eventual AL East and World Series champion Boston Red Sox.

Although the 2020 Pittsburgh Pirates had a 19–41 record, the fewest wins in a regular season since 1886, it is ignored because the season was shortened to 60 games due to the COVID-19 pandemic. The winning percentage was .317, higher than the .300 cutoff mentioned here.

The 2024 Chicago White Sox amassed 14-game, 21-game, and 12-game losing streaks over the course of the season, until ultimately the team reached 121 losses on September 27, surpassing the 1962 Mets' record for the most losses in the modern era.

The 2025 Colorado Rockies obtained the worst start to a season of any team through 39 games, starting off at 6–33 (.154 winning percentage). The Rockies then fell to 30 games below .500, accomplishing that mark in just 44 games. Their record was 7–37, a .159 winning percentage. The Rockies continued their abysmal start to the 2025 season by setting the record for the worst team record through 50 games. Their record of 8–42 (.160 winning percentage) was the worst 50 game start of any team in Major League baseball history, two games worse than the 2023 Oakland Athletics 10-40 start (.200 winning percentage). The 2025 Colorado Rockies' 10–50 (.167 winning percentage) record after 60 games eclipsed the 11-49 previous worst 60 game mark held by five teams: the 1886 Washington Nationals, the 1895 Louisville Colonels, the 1897 St. Louis Browns, the 1904 Washington Senators, and the 1932 Boston Red Sox. The Rockies finished tied for the third most losses in baseball history since 1901. They had two fewer losses than the 2024 Chicago White Sox and one fewer loss than the 1962 expansion team the New York Mets.

== See also ==
- List of best Major League Baseball season win–loss records
- Can't Anybody Here Play This Game? (1963 book)

== External links and further reading ==
- Statistics and game logs at Baseball Reference
- "The 1899 Cleveland Spiders: Baseball's Worst Team" article by David Fleitz
- "Nothing worse than the 1899 Cleveland Spiders" ESPN article by Rob Neyer. Neyer's 10 worst teams of all time.
- Neyer, Rob, and Eddie Epstein. Baseball Dynasties: The Greatest Teams of All Time. Norton, 2000, 384 p.
- Excerpt from Chapter 8 ("The Worst Teams of All Time") of Neyer and Epstein's Baseball Dynasties.
- On a Clear Day They Could See Seventh Place: Baseball's Worst Teams, by George Robinson. Profiles of several of the teams on this list.
- MISFITS! Baseball's Worst Ever Team, by J. Thomas Hetrick. About the 1899 Spiders.
