= The Gang That Couldn't Shoot Straight (novel) =

1969 novel by Jimmy Breslin

- First edition cover
- Author: Jimmy Breslin
- Language: English
- Genre: Novel
- Publisher: Viking Press
- Publication date: 1969
- Publication place: United States
- Media type: Print (Hardback & Paperback)
- Pages: 311 pp
- ISBN: 0-09-102080-8

The Gang That Couldn't Shoot Straight is a 1969 novel by Jimmy Breslin. It is a roman à clef based on the life of Joey Gallo.

It was adapted into the 1971 film of the same name, directed by James Goldstone.
