= New York Journal-American =

Newspaper published in New York from 1937 to 1966

- New York Journal American headlining the 1942 Battle of Stalingrad during World War II
- Type: Daily newspaper
- Format: Broadsheet
- Owner(s): William Randolph Hearst (1895–1951); William Randolph Hearst Jr. (1951–1966)
- Publisher: Hearst Corporation
- Founded: 1882 (as New York Morning Journal); 1895 (as The Journal); 1896 (New York Evening Journal); 1901 (as New York (Morning) American); 1937 (merger)
- Headquarters: New York City
- Price: USD 0.20 City & Suburbs 1957

Includes coverage of New York Journal-American and its predecessors New York Journal, The Journal, New York American and New York Evening Journal

New York Evening Journal reporting in 1899 on the American-Philippines War

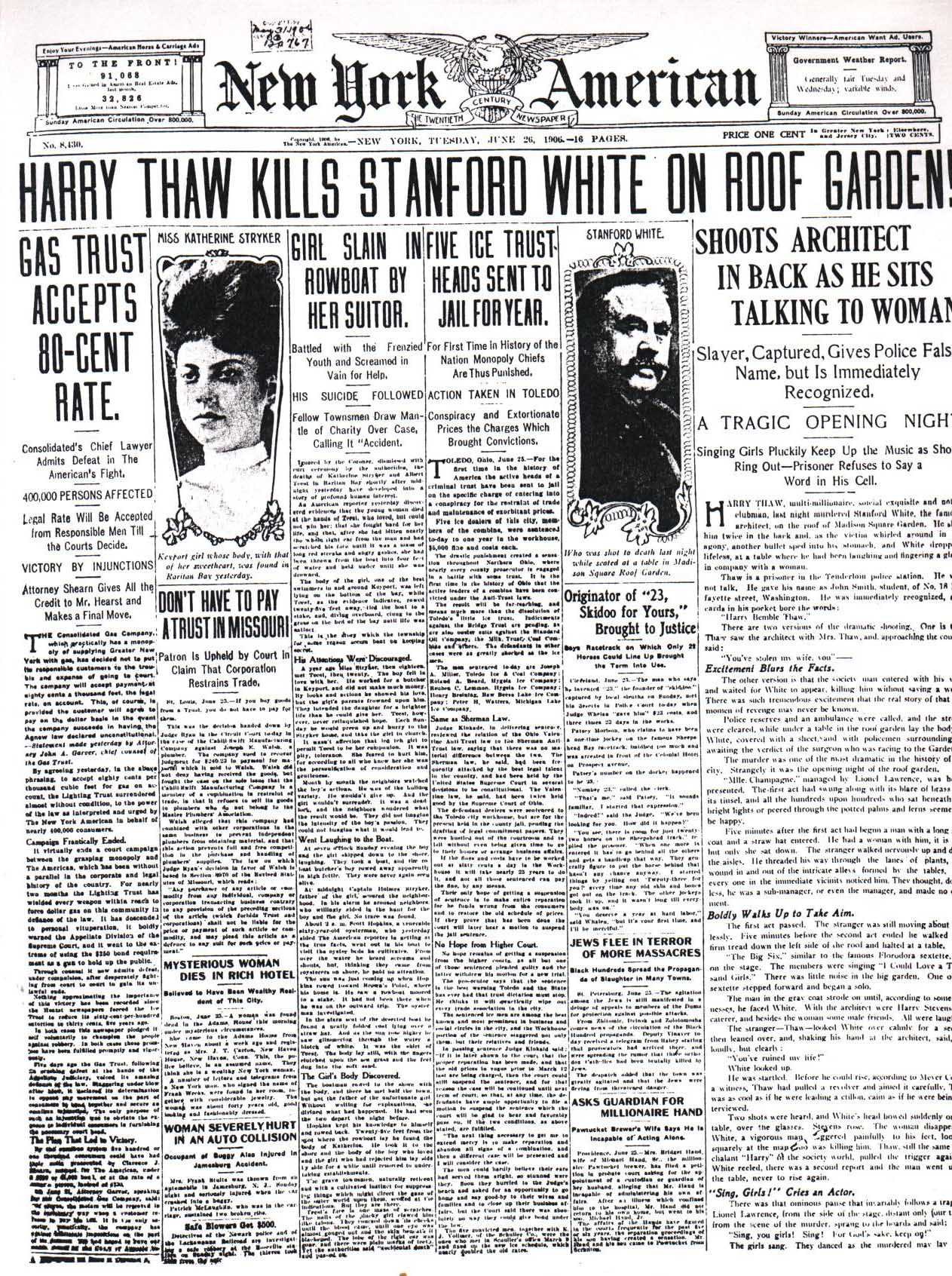
The front page of the June 26, 1906, issue of the New York American, prior to merger. The murder of Stanford White is its headline.

The New York Journal-American was a daily newspaper published in New York City from 1937 to 1966. The Journal-American was the product of a merger between two New York newspapers owned by William Randolph Hearst: the New York American (originally the New York Journal, renamed American in 1901), a morning paper, and the New York Evening Journal, an afternoon paper. Both were published by Hearst from 1895 to 1937. The American and Evening Journal merged in 1937.

== History ==
=== Beginnings ===
==== New York Morning Journal ====
Joseph Pulitzer's younger brother Albert founded the New York Morning Journal in 1882. After three years of its existence, John R. McLean briefly acquired the paper in 1895. It was renamed The Journal. But a year later in 1896, he sold it to Hearst.

==== New York American ====
In 1901, the morning newspaper was renamed New York American, following claims that the newspaper's editorial policies had encouraged the assassination of President McKinley.

On election night, November 7, 1916, in conjunction with the De Forest Radio Telephone and Telegraph company's experimental station 2XG, the paper made the first audio transmissions of election results by radio. (Earlier broadcasts had employed Morse code.) This broadcast was described by the newspaper as "For the first time the wireless telephone had been demonstrated as a practical, serviceable carrier of election news and comment."

==== New York Evening Journal ====
Hearst founded the New York Evening Journal about a year later in 1896. He entered into a circulation war with the New York World, the newspaper run by his former mentor Joseph Pulitzer and from whom he stole the cartoonists George McManus and Richard F. Outcault. In October 1896, Outcault defected to Hearst's New York Journal. Because Outcault had failed in his effort to copyright The Yellow Kid both newspapers published versions of the comic feature with George Luks providing the New York World with their version after Outcault left. The Yellow Kid was one of the first comic strips to be printed in color and gave rise to the phrase yellow journalism, used to describe the sensationalist and often exaggerated articles, which helped, along with a one-cent price tag, to greatly increase circulation of the newspaper. Many believed that as part of this, aside from any nationalistic sentiment, Hearst may have helped to initiate the Spanish–American War of 1898 with lurid exposes of Spanish atrocities against insurgents and foreign journalists.

In October 1936, New York Evening Journal reporter Dorothy Kilgallen participated in a race to travel around the world on commercial airline flights, together with Herbert Ekins of the New York World-Telegram and Leo Kieran of The New York Times. The race took 18.5 days. Kilgallen finished second.

==== New York Journal-American ====
In 1937, the morning New York American (since 1901) and the evening paper New York Evening Journal merged into New York Journal-American. The Journal-American was a publication with several editions in the afternoon and evening.

=== Comics ===
In the early 1900s, Hearst weekday morning and afternoon papers around the country featured scattered black-and-white comic strips, and on January 31, 1912, Hearst introduced the nation's first full daily comics page in the Evening Journal. On January 12, 1913, McManus launched his Bringing Up Father comic strip. The comics expanded into two full pages daily and a 12-page Sunday color section with leading King Features Syndicate strips. By the mid-1940s, the newspaper's Sunday comics included Bringing Up Father, Blondie, a full-page Prince Valiant, Flash Gordon, The Little King, Buz Sawyer, Feg Murray's Seein' Stars, Tim Tyler's Luck, Gene Ahern's Room and Board and The Squirrel Cage, The Phantom, Jungle Jim, Tillie the Toiler, Little Annie Rooney, Little Iodine, Bob Green's The Lone Ranger, Believe It or Not!, Uncle Remus, Dinglehoofer und His Dog, Donald Duck, Tippie, Right Around Home, Barney Google and Snuffy Smith, and The Katzenjammer Kids.

Tad Dorgan, known for his boxing and dog cartoons, as well as the comic character Judge Rummy, joined the Journal's staff in 1905.

In 1922, the Evening Journal introduced a Saturday color comics tabloid with strips not seen on Sunday, and this 12-page tabloid continued for decades, offering Popeye, Grandma, Don Tobin's The Little Woman, Mandrake the Magician, Don Flowers' Glamor Girls, Grin and Bear It, Buck Rogers, and other strips.

Rube Goldberg and Einar Nerman also became cartoonists with the Journal-American.

=== Columnists and reporters ===
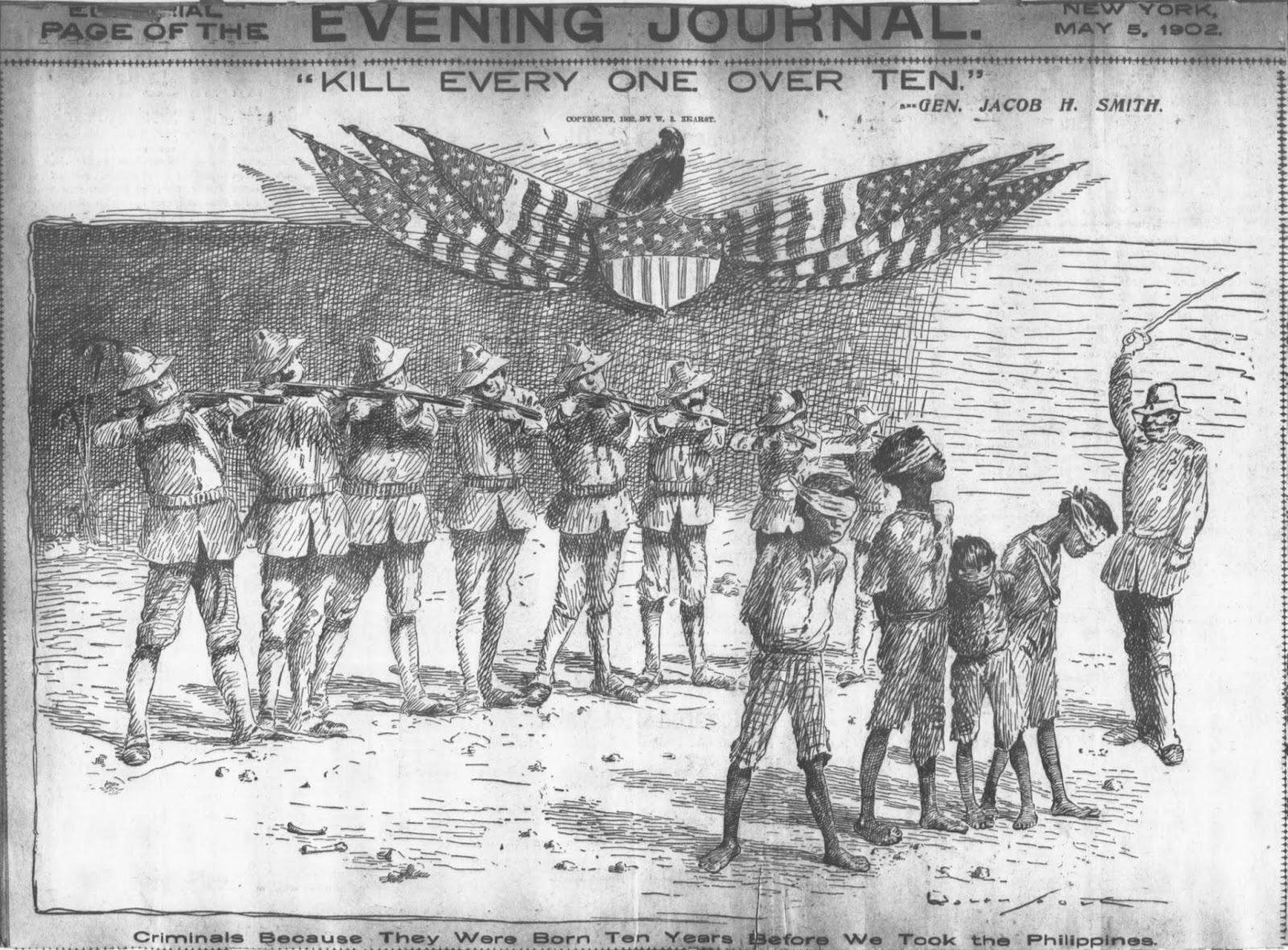
Editorial cartoon depicting Philippine–American War General Jacob H. Smith's order "Kill Everyone over Ten", scooped by the New York Journal, from the front page on May 5, 1902

The Evening Journal was home to famed investigative reporter Nellie Bly, who began writing for the paper in 1914 as a war correspondent from the battlefields of World War I. Bly eventually returned to the United States and was given her own column that she wrote right up until her death in 1922.

Popular columnists included Ambrose Bierce, Benjamin De Casseres, Dorothy Kilgallen, O. O. McIntyre, and Westbrook Pegler. Kilgallen also wrote articles that appeared on the same days as her column on different pages, sometimes the front page. Regular Journal-American contributor Jimmy Cannon was one of the highest paid sports columnists in the US. Society columnist Maury Henry Biddle Paul, who wrote under the pseudonym "Cholly Knickerbocker", became famous and coined the term "Café Society". John F. Kennedy contributed to the newspaper during a brief career as a journalist during the final months of World War II. Leonard Liebling served as the paper's music critic from 1923 to 1936.

=== Staff ===
Beginning in 1938, Max Kase (1898–1974) was the sports editor until the newspaper expired in 1966. The fashion editor was Robin Chandler Duke.

Jack O'Brian (1914–2000) was television critic for the Journal-American and exposed the 1958 quiz-show scandal that involved cheating on the popular television program Twenty-One. O'Brian was a supporter of Senator Joseph McCarthy and his series of published attacks on CBS News and WCBS-TV reporter Don Hollenbeck, may have been a major factor in Hollenbeck's eventual suicide, referenced in the 1986 HBO film Murrow and the 2005 motion picture Good Night, and Good Luck.

Ford Frick (1894–1978) was a sportswriter for the American before becoming president of baseball's National League (1934–1951), then commissioner of Major League Baseball (1951–1965). Frick was hired by Wilton S. Farnsworth, who was sports editor of the American from 1914 to 1937 until becoming a boxing promoter.

Bill Corum was a sportswriter for the Journal-American who also served nine years as president of the Churchill Downs race track. Frank Graham covered sports there from 1945 to 1965 and was inducted in the Baseball Hall of Fame, as were colleagues Charley Feeney and Sid Mercer.

Before becoming a news columnist elsewhere, Jimmy Breslin was a Journal-American sportswriter in the early 1960s. He authored the book Can't Anybody Here Play This Game? chronicling the season of the 1962 New York Mets.

Sheilah Graham (1904–1988) was a reporter for the Journal-American before gaining fame as a gossip columnist and as an acquaintance of F. Scott Fitzgerald.

William V. Finn, a staff photographer, died on the morning of June 25, 1958, while photographing the aftermath of a fiery collision between the tanker Empress Bay and cargo ship Nebraska in the East River. Finn was a past-president of the New York Press Photographers Association and was the second of only two of the association's members to die in the line of duty.

=== Photographs ===
The newspaper was famous for publishing many photographs with the "Journal-American Photo" credit line as well as news photographs from the Associated Press and other wire services.

== Decline ==
With one of the highest circulations in New York in the 1950s and 1960s, the Journal-American nevertheless had difficulties attracting advertising as its blue-collar reading base turned to television, a situation compounded by how television news was affecting evening newspapers more than their morning counterparts. The domination of television news became evident starting with the four-day period of JFK's assassination, Jack Ruby's shooting of Lee Harvey Oswald and both men's funerals. New York newspapers in general were in dire straits by then, following a devastating newspaper strike in late 1962 and early 1963.

Journal-American editors, apparently sensing that psychotherapy and rock music were starting to enter the consciousness of both blue-collar and white-collar New Yorkers, enlisted Dr. Joyce Brothers to write front-page articles in February 1964 analyzing the Beatles. While the Beatles were filming Help! in the Bahamas, columnist Phyllis Battelle interviewed them for articles that ran on the Journal-American front page and in other Hearst papers, including the Los Angeles Herald Examiner, for four consecutive days, from April 25 to 28, 1965.

During every visit that the Beatles made to New York in 1964 and 1965, including their appearances at Shea Stadium, various Journal-American columnists and reporters devoted a lot of space to them.

Throughout 1964 and 1965, Dorothy Kilgallen's Voice of Broadway column, which ran Sunday through Friday, often reported short news items about trendy young rock groups and performers such as The Rolling Stones, The Animals, The Dave Clark Five, Mary Wells and Sam Cooke. The newspaper was trying to keep up with the many mid-1960s changes in popular music and its interracial fan bases.

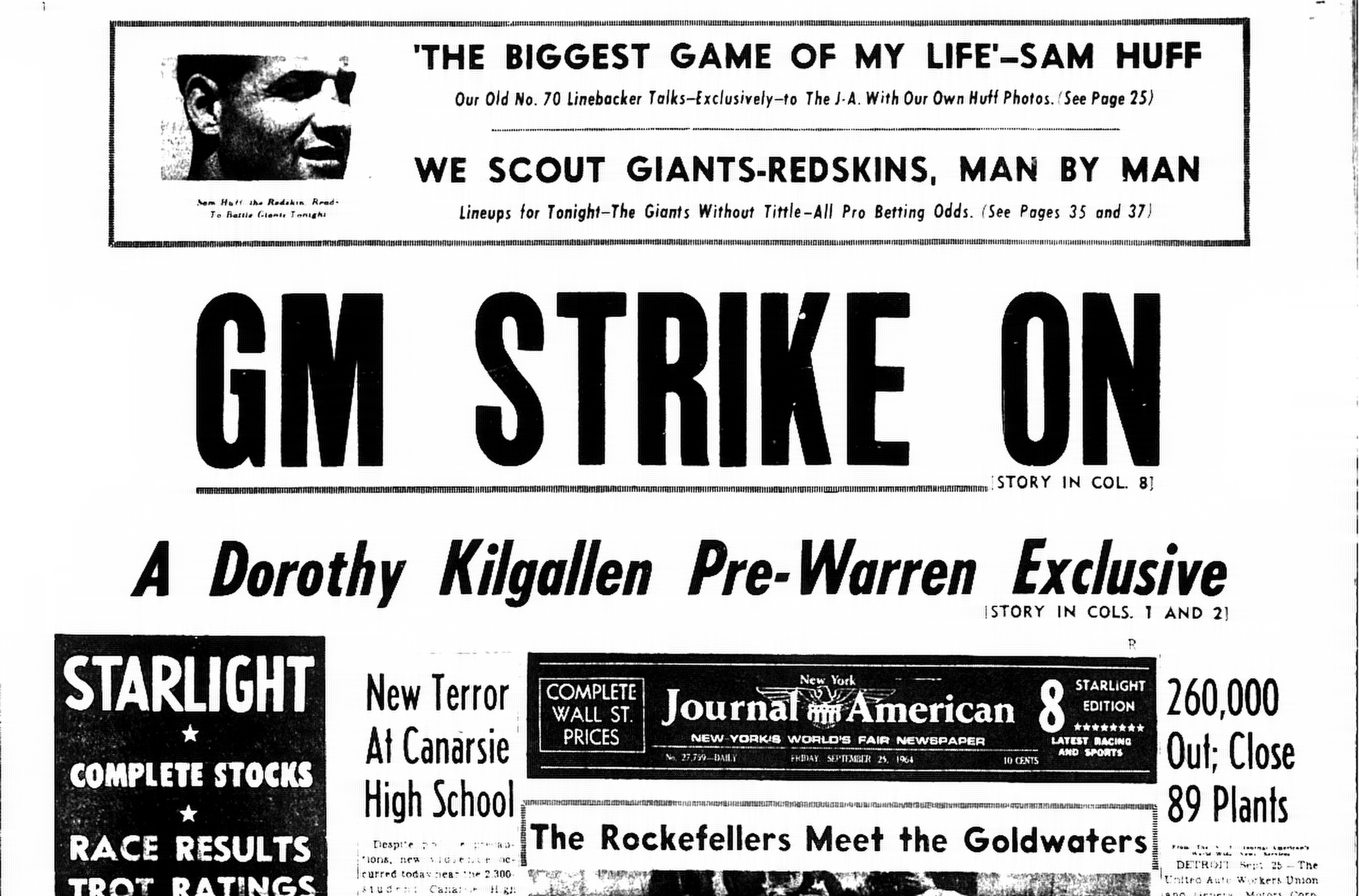
Edition of Friday afternoon, September 25, 1964

It published enlarged photographs of civil rights demonstrations, Dorothy Kilgallen's skepticism about the Warren Commission report as well as many reporters' stories on the increasing crime rate in New York's five boroughs.

Most of the front page of the Sunday edition of January 12, 1964, ran stories that were relevant to the previous day's announcement by U.S. Surgeon General Luther Terry that "a blue ribbon committee of scientists and doctors," in the words of reporter Jack Pickering, had concluded that cigarette smoking was dangerous.

The Journal-American's feel of the pulse of the changing times of the mid-1960s hid the trouble that was going on behind the scenes at the paper, which was unknown to many New Yorkers until after it had ceased publication.

Besides trouble with advertisers, another major factor that led to the Journal-American's demise was a power struggle between Hearst CEO Richard E. Berlin and two of Hearst's sons, who had trouble carrying on the father's legacy after his 1951 death. William Randolph Hearst Jr. claimed in 1991 that Berlin, who died in 1986, had suffered from Alzheimer's disease starting in the mid-1960s and that caused him to shut down several Hearst newspapers without just cause.

== Merger ==
The Journal-American ceased publishing in April 1966, officially the victim of a general decline in the revenue of afternoon newspapers. While participating in a lock-out in 1965 after The New York Times and New York Daily News had been struck by a union, the Journal-American agreed it would merge (the following year) with its evening rival, the New York World-Telegram and Sun, and the morning New York Herald-Tribune. According to its publisher, publication of the combined New York World Journal Tribune was delayed for several months after the April 1966 expiration of its three components because of difficulty reaching an agreement with manual laborers who were needed to operate the press. The World Journal Tribune commenced publication on September 12, 1966, but folded eight months later.

== Archives ==
Other afternoon and evening newspapers that expired following the rise of network news in the 1960s donated their clipping files and many darkroom prints of published photographs to libraries. The Hearst Corporation decided to donate the "basic back-copy morgue" of the Journal-American, according to a book about Dorothy Kilgallen, plus darkroom prints and negatives, according to other sources, to the University of Texas at Austin. Office memorandums and letters from politicians and other notables were shredded in 1966, shortly after the newspaper expired.

Unlike two other New York City daily newspapers, the tabloid New York Daily News and The New York Times, the Journal-American has not been digitized and can not be accessed in a database or online archive. The newspaper is preserved on microfilm in New York City, Washington, DC, and Austin, Texas. Interlibrary loans make the microfilm accessible to people who cannot travel to those cities. The COVID-19 pandemic curtailed interlibrary loans, especially for researchers who need reels of microfilm that exist in very few places. On rare occasions, researchers have digitally scanned Journal-American pages, articles or columns, such as Dorothy Kilgallen's, from microfilm and shared them on social media and other websites. These are rare opportunities for historians to become familiar with this newspaper.

The Journal-American photo morgue is housed at the Harry Ransom Center at the University of Texas at Austin. The photographic morgue consists of approximately two million prints and one million negatives created for publication, with the bulk of the collection covering the years from 1937 to the paper's demise in 1966. The Dolph Briscoe Center for American History, also at the University of Texas at Austin, has the Journal-American morgue of clippings, numbering approximately nine million. Because they are not digitized and because employees of the facility have limited time for communicating by email with people who are searching for very old articles, the people who are searching should know the date of a Journal-American article to locate it on microfilm.

== Coverage of the H. H. Holmes murder case ==
Scoops by The Journal included a confession from Herman Webster Mudghett, also known as Dr. H. H. Holmes, a serial killer in Chicago in 1896.

The Journal April 12, 1896 front page with Holmes mugshots

The Journal April 12, 1896 showing at the top Holmes "Murder Castle" and at bottom the trunk used by Holmes to kill the Pietzel sisters

The Journal April 12, 1896 showing at center pictures of 10 known victims of Holmes
