= Leopold Badia =

Leopold Badia (1905–1976) was a Spanish-born American Broadway and film actor. He was in the 1928 production of Machinal by Sophia Treadwell and in the 1971 movie The Gang That Couldn't Shoot Straight directed by James Goldstone.
