= Jimmy Breslin =

American journalist and author (1928–2017)

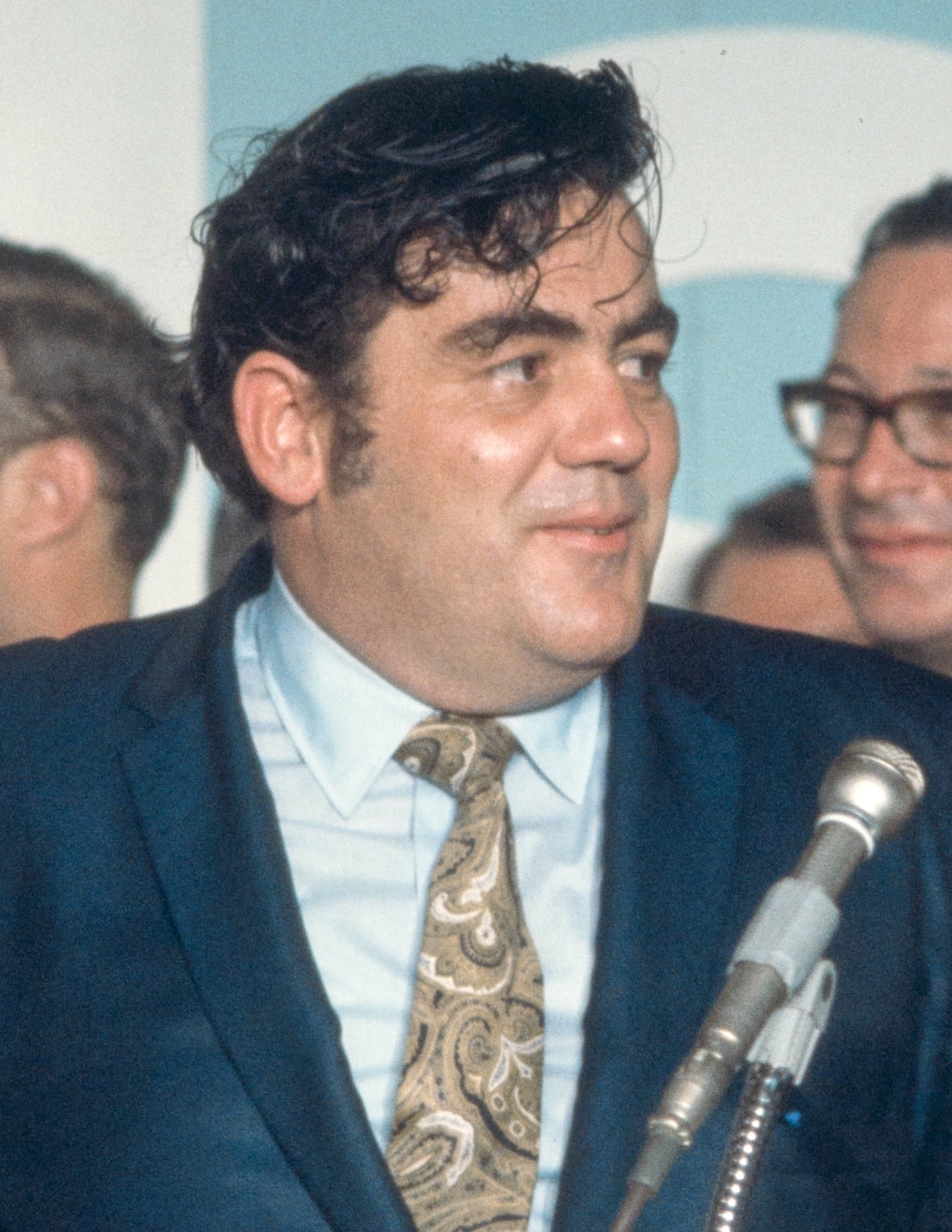
- Breslin, c. 1970
- Born: James Earle Breslin; October 17, 1928; New York City, U.S.
- Died: March 19, 2017 (aged 88); New York City, U.S.
- Occupations: Reporter; columnist; novelist; screenwriter; playwright; actor
- Spouses: Rosemary Dattalico (m. 1954; died 1981) Ronnie Eldridge (m. 1982)
- Children: 6
- Writing career
- Notable awards: George Polk Award; Pulitzer Prize

James Earle Breslin (October 17, 1928 – March 19, 2017) was an American journalist and author. Until the time of his death, he wrote a column for the New York Daily News Sunday edition. He wrote numerous novels, and columns of his appeared regularly in various newspapers in his hometown of New York City. He served as a regular columnist for the Long Island newspaper Newsday until his retirement on November 2, 2004, though he still published occasional pieces for the paper until his death.

He was known for his newspaper columns, which were seen as a brash embodiment of the street-smart New Yorker, chronicling wise guys and big-city power brokers while remaining sympathetic to the views of white working-class New York residents. Breslin was awarded the 1986 Pulitzer Prize for Commentary "for columns which consistently champion ordinary citizens."

== Early life and education ==
Breslin was born on October 17, 1928, into an Irish Catholic family in Jamaica, Queens, New York City. His alcoholic father, James Earl Breslin, a piano player, went out one day to buy rolls and never returned. Breslin and his sister, Deirdre, were raised by their mother, Frances (Curtin), a high school teacher and New York City Welfare Department investigator, during the Great Depression in the United States.

Breslin attended Long Island University from 1948 to 1950. He left without graduating.

== Career ==
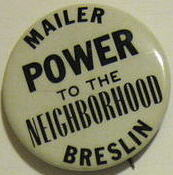
A Mailer–Breslin campaign button in 1969

Breslin began working for the Long Island Press as a copy boy in the 1940s. After leaving college, he became a columnist. His early columns were attributed to politicians and ordinary people that he chatted with in various watering holes near Queens Borough Hall. Breslin was a columnist for the New York Herald Tribune, the Daily News, the New York Journal American, Newsday, The Daily Beast, the National Police Gazette and other venues.

When the Sunday supplement of the Tribune was reworked into New York magazine by editor Clay Felker in 1962, Breslin appeared in the new edition, which became "the hottest Sunday read in town."

One of his best known columns was published the day after John F. Kennedy's funeral and focused on the man who had dug the president's grave. The column, titled It’s an Honor, was published in the New York Herald Tribune, on November 26, 1963 (four days after Kennedy's death). The piece, sometimes referred to as the "Grave Digger Story", is indicative of Breslin's style, which often highlights how major events or the actions of those considered "newsworthy" affect the "common man".

Breslin's public profile in the 1960s as a regular guy led to a brief stint as a TV pitchman for Piels Beer, including a bar room commercial wherein he intoned in his deep voice: "Piels—it's a good drinkin' beer!"

In 1969, Breslin ran for president of the New York City Council in tandem with Norman Mailer, who was seeking election as mayor, on the unsuccessful independent 51st State ticket advocating secession of the city from the rest of the state. A memorable quotation of his from the experience: "I am mortified to have taken part in a process that required bars to be closed." The ticket was referred to as "Vote the Rascals In."

Breslin's career as an investigative journalist led him to cultivate ties with various Mafia and criminal elements in the city, not always with positive results. In 1970, he was viciously attacked and brutally beaten at The Suite, a restaurant then owned by Lucchese crime family associate Henry Hill. The attack was carried out by Irish mobster Jimmy Burke, who objected to an article Breslin had written involving another member of the Lucchese family, Paul Vario. Breslin suffered a major concussion, a minor concussion, three broken fingers, a fractured rib, a broken nose and nosebleeding, but survived the ordeal without any permanent injury. He filed a police report claiming Burke attacked him, but no charges were filed.

In 1971, Breslin spoke at Harvard's Class Day. Two years later, on September 6, 1973, he appeared on The Tonight Show Starring Johnny Carson alongside Glen Campbell, Don Rickles and Dom DeLuise.

In 1977, at the height of the Son of Sam scare in New York City, the killer, later identified as David Berkowitz, addressed letters to Breslin. Excerpts from the letters were published and used later in Spike Lee's film Summer of Sam, which Breslin, portraying himself, bookends. In 2008, the Library of America selected one of Breslin's many Son of Sam articles published in the Daily News for inclusion in its two-century retrospective of American true crime writing.

In 1978, Breslin, without significant acting experience, appeared in Joe Brooks' feature film If Ever I See You Again in a main supporting role playing "Mario Marino," the assistant to two Madison Avenue jingle composers. Breslin's performance received a Golden Turkey Award nomination for "Worst Performance by a Novelist." In 1982 Breslin was compared to English author Jilly Cooper.

In 1986, Breslin revealed that Donald Manes, the Borough President of Queens, was involved in a kickback scheme. Manes later died of suicide.

In October 1986, Breslin landed his own twice-weekly late night television show on ABC, Jimmy Breslin's People, in which he was seen interviewing poor New Yorkers at home, as well as some who were incarcerated. However, because many network affiliates had already committed to syndicated programming for Breslin's time slot when the new season started a month earlier, Breslin's show was often delayed or preempted altogether; even the network's flagship station WABC pushed it back from its midnight slot to 2 a.m., and would occasionally only air it one night a week. Disgusted, Breslin took out a full-page ad in The New York Times announcing that he was "firing the network" and would be ending the show after its December 20 broadcast (at which time his 13-week contract expired).

In 1991, while covering the Crown Heights riot, he was beaten and robbed by a crowd of youths.

Shortly before his death, Breslin and Pete Hamill were interviewed about their careers for the 2019 HBO documentary Breslin and Hamill: Deadline Artists.

== Awards and recognition ==
In 1985, he received a George Polk Award for Metropolitan Reporting. In 1986, he was awarded the Pulitzer Prize for Commentary.

== Controversies ==
In May 1990, after fellow Newsday columnist Ji-Yeon Yuh described one of his articles as sexist, Breslin heatedly retorted with racial and sexual invective. Asian American and anti-hate groups forcefully decried Breslin's outburst. Breslin appeared on The Howard Stern Show to banter about his outburst and Koreans in general. Following this controversial radio broadcast, Newsday managing editor Anthony Marro suspended Breslin for two weeks without pay. He then apologized. "Reached at home for a comment, Mr. Breslin said, 'Leave me alone.'"

Author and former FBI agent Robert K. Ressler has stated that Breslin "baited Berkowitz and irresponsibly contributed to the continuation of his murders" by trying to sell sensationalist newspapers. In Ressler's book Whoever Fights Monsters, Ressler condemns Breslin and the media for their involvement in encouraging serial killers by directing their activity with printed conjectures. In return for his "relentless columns on police misbehavior," the local patrolmen's union bought protest ads in his own newspaper.

== Personal life ==
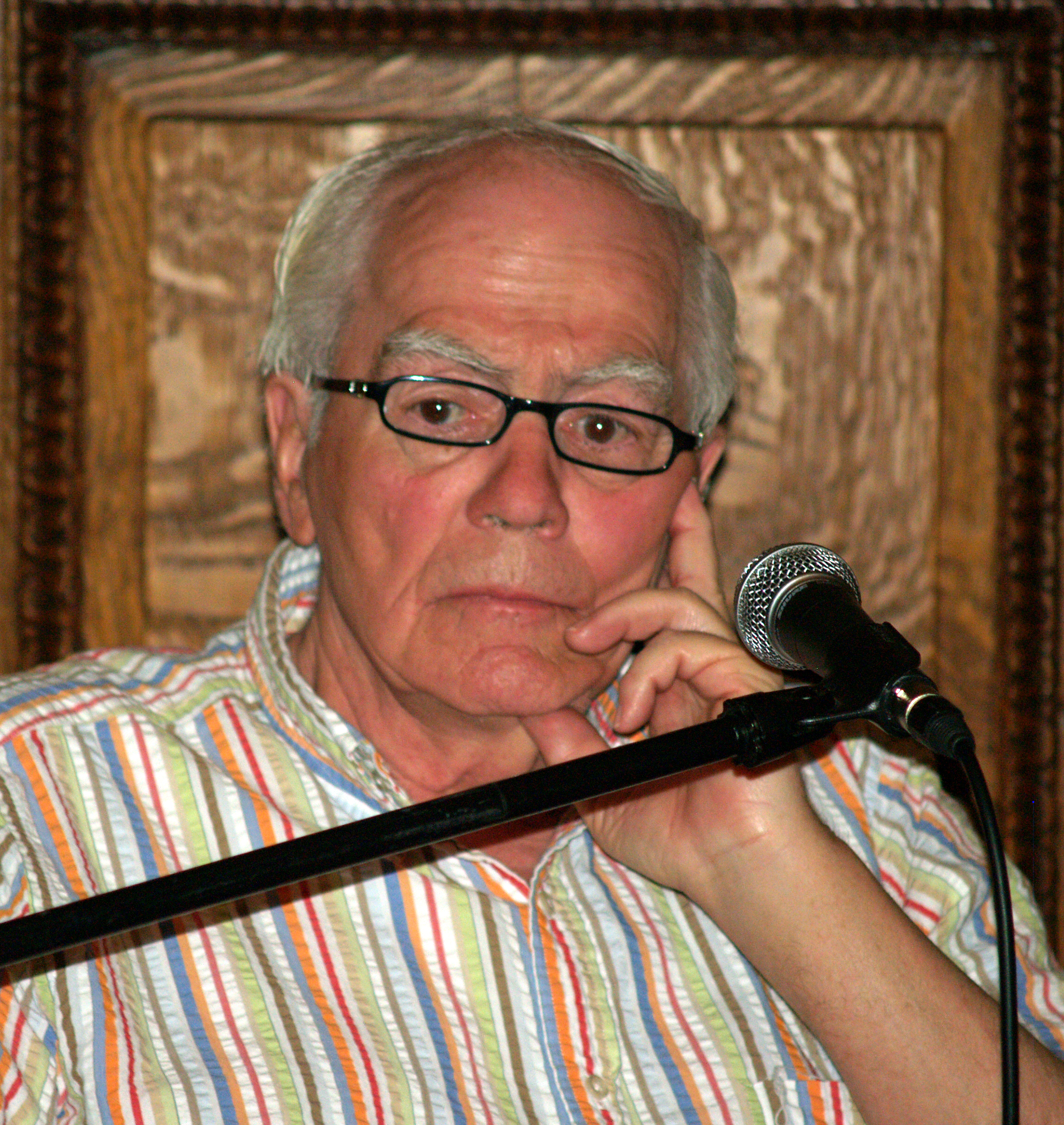
Breslin at the 2008 Brooklyn Book Festival

Breslin was married twice. His first marriage, to Rosemary Dattolico, ended with her death in 1981. They had six children together: sons Kevin, James, Patrick, and Christopher, and daughters Rosemary and Kelly. His daughter Rosemary died June 14, 2004, from a rare blood disease, and his daughter Kelly, 44, died on April 21, 2009, four days after suffering from cardiac arrhythmia in a New York City restaurant.

From 1982 until his death in 2017, Breslin was married to former New York City Council member Ronnie Eldridge.

== Death ==
Breslin died from pneumonia on March 19, 2017, at his home in Manhattan, at the age of 88.

== Filmography ==
Year	Title	Role	Notes
1978	If Ever I See You Again	Mario Marino	
1980	I Go Pogo	P.T. Bridgeport	Voice
1999	Summer of Sam	Himself	(final film role)

== Selected works ==
External videos
- Booknotes interview with Breslin on Damon Runyon: A Life, December 29, 1991, C-SPAN
- Presentation with Breslin on I Want to Thank My Brain for Remembering Me, September 11, 1996, C-SPAN
- Presentation by Breslin on The Short Sweet Dream of Eduardo Gutierrez, March 26, 2002, C-SPAN
- Presentation by Breslin on The Church That Forgot Christ, July 21, 2004, C-SPAN

In addition to writing articles, Breslin authored multiple books. Selected works are listed below.

- 1962 Sunny Jim: The life of America's most beloved horseman, James Fitzsimmons ASIN B0007DY5XS
- 1963 Can't Anybody Here Play This Game? ASIN: B00704TRH6
- 1969 World of Jimmy Breslin ISBN 0-345-21651-2
- 1969 The Gang That Couldn't Shoot Straight ISBN 0-316-11174-0
- 1973 World without End, Amen ISBN 0-670-79020-6
- 1976 How the Good Guys Finally Won ISBN 0-345-25001-X
- 1978 .44 ISBN 0-670-32432-9
- 1983 Forsaking All Others ISBN 0-449-20250-X
- 1986 Table Money ISBN 0-89919-312-9
- 1988 He Got Hungry and Forgot His Manners ISBN 0-89919-311-0
- 1988 The World According to Jimmy Breslin ISBN 978-0-89919-310-6
- 1991 Damon Runyon: A Life ISBN 0-89919-984-4
- 1997 I Want to Thank My Brain for Remembering Me: A Memoir ISBN 0-316-11879-6
- 2002 American Lives: The Stories of the Men and Women Lost on September 11 ISBN 0-940159-77-5
- 2002 I Don't Want to Go to Jail: A Novel ISBN 0-316-12032-4
- 2002 The Short Sweet Dream of Eduardo Gutiérrez ISBN 0-609-60827-4; from Tom Robbins' review in The Village Voice: "Abuse of office, greedy builders, a growing army of easily victimized immigrants: All of these elements came to a head in the mangled construction of 50 Middleton Street and the death of Eduardo Gutiérrez. ... [The story's] telling is one more debt the city owes to Breslin, who keeps track of these things for us."
- 2004 The Church That Forgot Christ ISBN 0-7432-6647-1
- 2005 America's Mayor: The Hidden History of Rudy Giuliani's New York – Preface to Robert Polner's book ISBN 1-932360-58-1
- 2007 America's Mayor, America's President? The Strange Career of Rudy Giuliani – Preface to Robert Polner's next book ISBN 1-933368-72-1
- 2008 The Good Rat: A True Story ISBN 978-0-06-085666-3
- 2011 Branch Rickey ISBN 978-0-670-02249-6

== See also ==
- New Yorkers in journalism
