= Perriton Maxwell =

American author, editor, and artist (1868–1947)

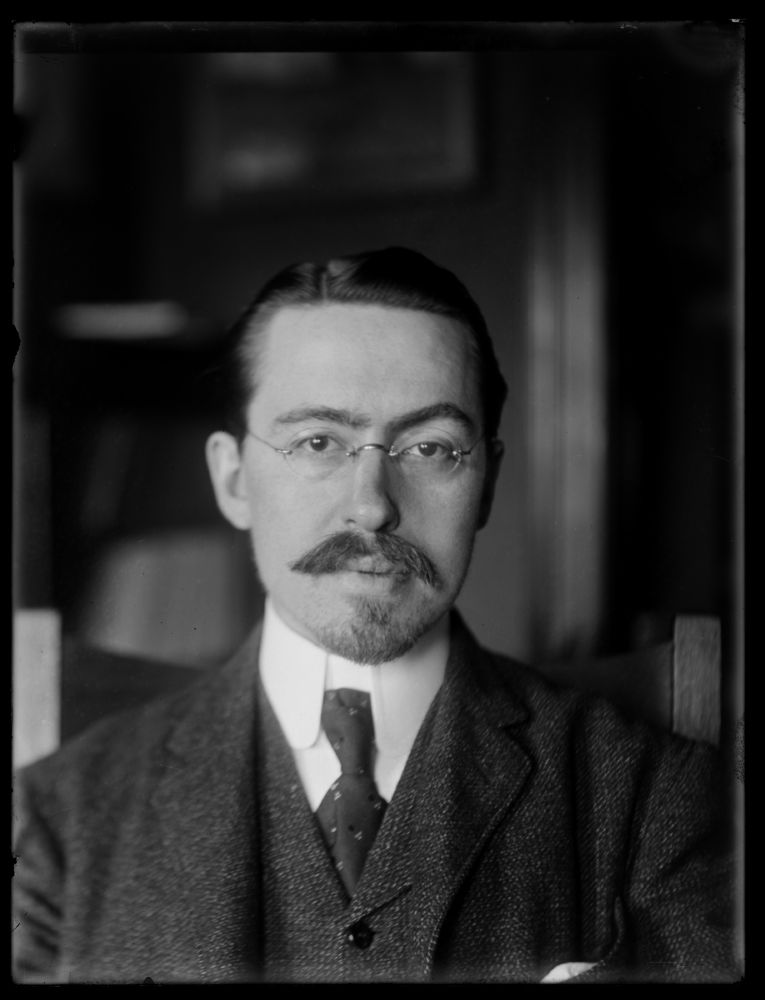
- Born: January 11, 1868; New York City
- Died: May 2, 1947 (aged 78); New York City
- Occupations: Editor, author, illustrator

Signature
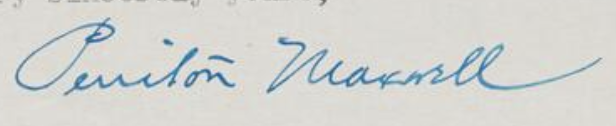

Perriton Maxwell (January 11, 1868 – May 2, 1947) was an American author, editor and artist.

== Early life and education ==
Maxwell was born in 1868 to Alfred Chester and Mary Louise Perriton Maxell. He went to public school in New York City and was also educated by private tutors in Brooklyn. He attended the Brooklyn Art School. In 1889, he married Myra Sydney Schuyler and became a journalist a few years later.

== Career ==
Maxwell began his career as Sunday editor at the New York Recorder. He also later served on the editorial staffs of the New York Sun, Vogue, and The Saturday Evening Post where he was both writer and illustrator. He was the editor of Metropolitan Magazine (1900–1906), Cosmopolitan (1906–1910), Nash's Magazine (1910–1913), Hearst's Magazine (1913–1914), The Chronicle (1917), Judge, and Leslie's Weekly (1917–1921). He was fiction editor of The Modern Priscilla (1919–1920), art editor for the New York Recorder (1922–1923), Photoplay Magazine (1923–1927), and editor of Arts and Decoration (1922–1923), The Police Magazine (1924 1925), Suniland: A Magazine of Florida (1926), Theater Magazine (1927 1929), and Good News Radio Magazine (1930). When asked why he had held so many different jobs Maxwell said it was "to better himself financially."

He was the author of two published books: Masterpieces of Art and Nature (1893) and A Third of Life (1921) though he claimed to have written several more. Discussing Maxwell in 1969, Dale Randall said "Something of the pride of the man may be gathered from the fact that most of the many fiction titles he listed in Who's Who are not to be verified by any standard reference." His novel A Third of Life was reviewed as being more of a "thesis on dreams" than a novel. In 1930 he went into radio work, working on the program Famous Authors on the Air. He wrote a number of plays for radio including The Conclave of Nations, a broadcast featuring people from foreign countries who were stationed in Washington.

Maxwell died at Harlem Hospital in New York City in 1947.
