= Can't Anybody Here Play This Game? =

1963 book by Jimmy Breslin

- First edition
- Author: Jimmy Breslin
- Language: English
- Published: 1963
- Publisher: Viking Press, Ivan R. Dee
- Publication place: United States

Can't Anybody Here Play This Game? is a 1963 book by journalist Jimmy Breslin, about the 1962 New York Mets. The book chronicles the first season of the Mets, an expansion team that had a W–L record of 40–120, setting a modern-era MLB record for losses in a season. (In 2024, the Chicago White Sox lost 121 games, breaking the record, though they won 41 so their winning percentage was better than that of the '62 Mets.) The title of the book came from a remark made by Mets manager Casey Stengel expressing his frustration over the team's spectacular ineptitude.

The book contains an introduction by the Baseball Hall of Famer Bill Veeck.

== See also ==
- 1962 New York Mets season
- 2024 Chicago White Sox season, the team that broke the 1962 Mets' modern-day loss record by one game
- 1899 Cleveland Spiders season, all-time Major League record for losses in a season with 134
- List of worst Major League Baseball season win–loss records
