= Dave Stewart (baseball) =

American baseball player and executive (born 1957)

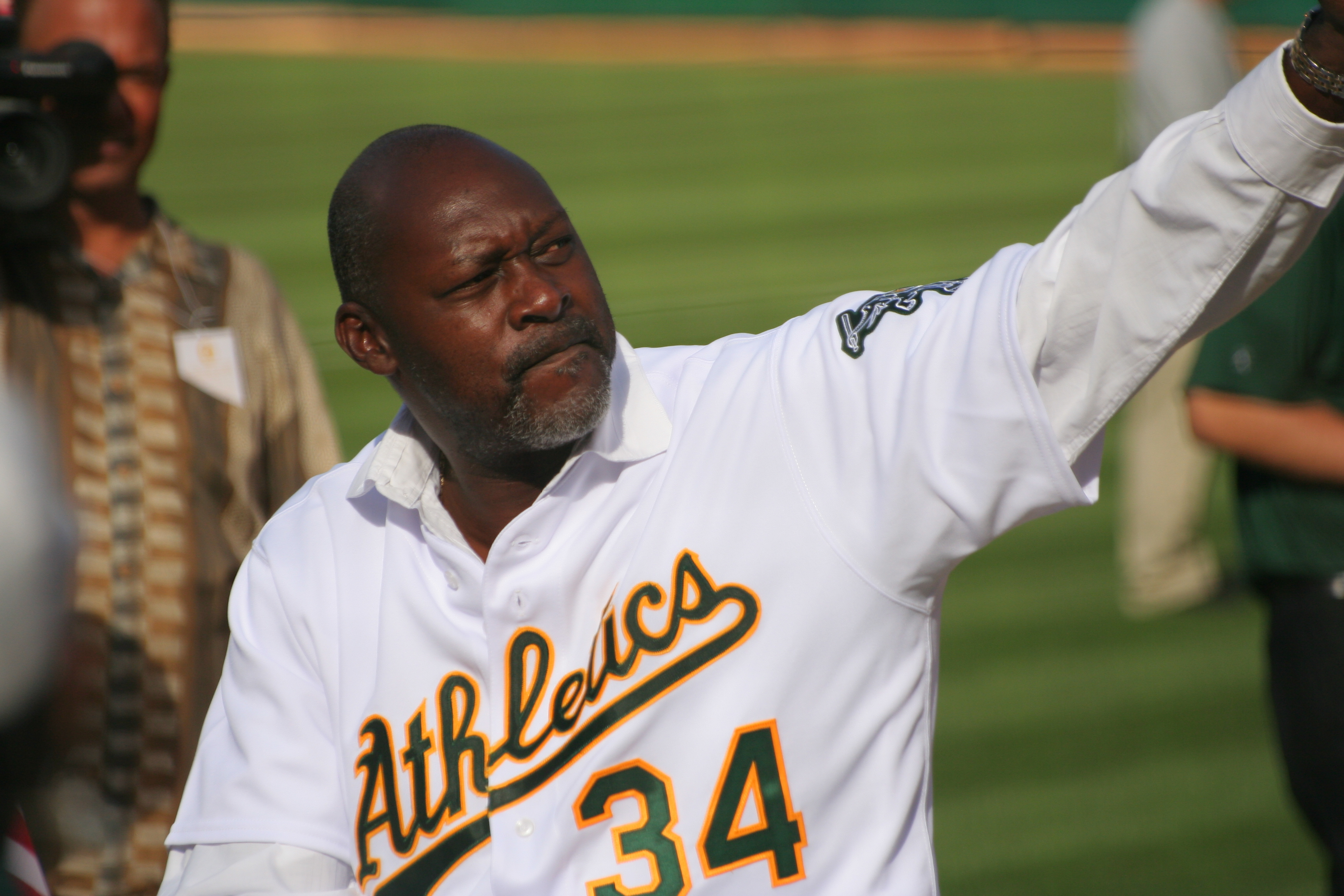
- Stewart in 2009
- Pitcher
- Born: February 19, 1957 (age 69); Oakland, California, U.S.
- Batted: Right Threw: Right

MLB debut
- September 22, 1978, for the Los Angeles Dodgers

Last MLB appearance
- July 17, 1995, for the Oakland Athletics

MLB statistics
- Win–loss record: 168–129
- Earned run average: 3.95
- Strikeouts: 1,741
- Stats at Baseball Reference

Teams
- As player: Los Angeles Dodgers (1978, 1981–1983); Texas Rangers (1983–1985); Philadelphia Phillies (1985–1986); Oakland Athletics (1986–1992); Toronto Blue Jays (1993–1994); Oakland Athletics (1995); As coach: San Diego Padres (1998); Toronto Blue Jays (2000); Milwaukee Brewers (2002)

Career highlights and awards
- All-Star (1989); 3× World Series champion (1981, 1989, 1993); World Series MVP (1989); 2× ALCS MVP (1990, 1993); Roberto Clemente Award (1990); AL wins leader (1987); Pitched no-hitter on June 29, 1990; Athletics No. 34 retired; Athletics Hall of Fame

David Keith Stewart (born February 19, 1957), nicknamed "Smoke", is an American professional baseball executive, pitching coach, sports agent, and former starting pitcher. The Los Angeles Dodgers' 16th-round selection in the 1975 MLB draft, Stewart's MLB playing career spanned from 1978 through 1995, winning three World Series championships all with different clubs while compiling a career 3.95 earned run average (ERA) and a 168–129 won–lost record, including winning 20 games in four consecutive seasons. He pitched for the Dodgers, Texas Rangers, Philadelphia Phillies, Oakland Athletics, and Toronto Blue Jays.

Stewart was an MLB All-Star and was known for his intimidating pitching style and his postseason performance, winning one World Series Most Valuable Player Award and two League Championship Series Most Valuable Player Awards. He is one of three players in MLB history to win three playoff MVP awards, alongside Corey Seager and Orel Hershiser. After his playing career, he served as a pitching coach for the San Diego Padres, Milwaukee Brewers, and Blue Jays and as an assistant general manager (GM). He worked under several GMs, including Sandy Alderson, Kevin Towers, Gord Ash, and Dean Taylor. He later became a sports agent based in San Diego until the Arizona Diamondbacks hired him as general manager at the end of the 2014 season, a position he held until 2016.

== Early life ==
Stewart was born in Oakland, California. His father, David, was a longshoreman, and his mother, Nathalie, worked at a cannery. His father didn't want Stewart to play sports, because he felt nobody could make a living hitting a ball, so his older brother taught him how to play. As a kid, Stewart spent many days at the East Oakland Branch of the Oakland Boys Club.

Stewart attended St. Elizabeth High School in Oakland, where he earned All-American honors in both baseball (where he played catcher) and in football (where he was a linebacker and tight end). He also averaged 16 points per game as a small forward on the basketball team. He was offered 30 college scholarships to play football, but turned them all down to sign with the Los Angeles Dodgers, who selected him in the 16th round of the 1975 Major League Baseball draft.

== Professional career ==
=== Los Angeles Dodgers ===
The Dodgers decided to turn Stewart into a pitcher because of his strong arm. He made his professional debut with the Bellingham Dodgers of the short-season single-A Northwest League. He had a 0–5 win–loss record with a 5.51 earned run average (ERA) in 22 games pitched, five of which were games started, for a Bellingham team that set a record by losing the first 24 games of the season. He was promoted to the Midwest League at the end of the 1976 season and with the Clinton Dodgers in 1977 he had a breakout season: 17–4 with a 2.15 ERA in 24 starts, including 15 complete games and 3 shutouts. Despite his impressive season, he lost out on the Midwest League MVP and Top prospect honors to future Hall of Famer Paul Molitor, then with the Burlington Bees. Stewart was promoted to the AA San Antonio Dodgers of the Texas League for the 1978 season. He was 14–12 with a 3.68 ERA in 28 starts for San Antonio.

Stewart made his major league debut on September 22, 1978, pitching two innings in relief against the San Diego Padres. He allowed only one hit and no runs while striking out one batter (Jim Beswick). That was his only appearance for the Dodgers that season. Stewart spent all of the 1979 and 1980 seasons in AAA with the Albuquerque Dukes. Despite an 11–12 record and 5.24 ERA in 28 games for the Dukes in 1979, Stewart felt he pitched well and was disappointed when he did not receive a September call-up. In 1980, he was 15–10 with a 3.70 ERA for a Dukes team that won the Pacific Coast League (PCL) Championship. He led the PCL in innings pitched (202) and starts (29) and tied for the league lead in wins (15).

Stewart went to spring training with the Dodgers in 1981. Because he was out of options, the Dodgers could not send him back down to the minors without risk of losing him to another team. They initially planned to release him, but eventually cut Don Stanhouse instead. He made the Dodgers opening day roster and pitched in relief that season, appearing in 32 games with a 2.49 ERA and six saves. He got his first Major League win in his first appearance of the season, on April 13 against the San Francisco Giants, when he worked two scoreless innings in relief of Bob Welch. His first save was recorded on August 16 against the Atlanta Braves. When MLB's players went on a two-month long strike on June 12, Stewart was hard-pressed financially and went to work for a Dodger fan that owned a metal fastener business and worked out with a semi-pro team along with teammate Bobby Castillo. The Dodgers made the split-season playoffs and Stewart saw his first taste of post-season action, being credited as the losing pitcher in the first two games of the Division Series against the Houston Astros. He allowed a walk-off homer to Alan Ashby in game one and allowing the winning runs to reach base in the 11th inning of game two. He redeemed himself by not allowing a run in the two games he appeared in for the Dodgers in the 1981 World Series against the New York Yankees, which the Dodgers won in six games.

He spent time as both a starter and a reliever in 1982, appearing in 45 games (starting 14 of them) and was 9–8 with a 3.81 ERA. The Dodgers almost traded Stewart to the Texas Rangers after the 1982 season in a package for catcher Jim Sundberg, however, Sundberg wouldn't waive his no-trade clause and the deal fell apart. In 1983, he appeared in 46 games for the Dodgers, all but one as a relief pitcher, with a 5–2 record and a 2.96 ERA. On July 11, he was part of a play that Dodgers Manager Tommy Lasorda called one of the "craziest" moments he'd ever seen, when three runs scored on a wild pitch.

=== Texas Rangers ===
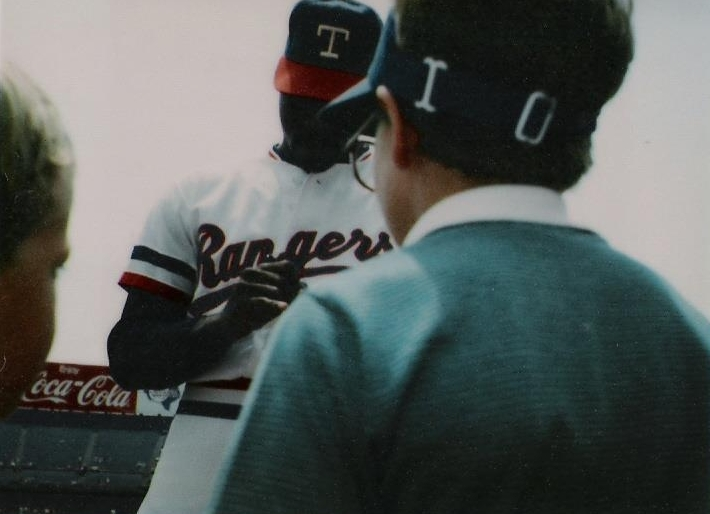
Dave Stewart signing autographs at Texas Rangers/Eckerd Drug Camera Day at Arlington Stadium on Sunday, April 28, 1985.

On August 19, 1983, the Dodgers traded Stewart with a player to be named later (Ricky Wright) to the Rangers for Rick Honeycutt. The trade was controversial at the time, with many feeling that Rangers GM Joe Klein had gotten too little in exchange for his team's best pitcher. The Rangers placed Stewart in the starting rotation. He made eight starts down the stretch, going 5–2 with a 2.14 ERA. In 1984, however, Stewart struggled, producing a 7–14 record and a 4.73 ERA in 27 starts before losing his rotation spot. Tom House joined the organization in January 1985 as the team's new pitching coach. He decided that Stewart needed a new pitch and started teaching him a split-fingered fastball.

In 1985, the Rangers used Stewart as a relief pitcher, but his performances out of the bullpen were poor. On May 22 he gave up a three-run homer to Jorge Orta of the Kansas City Royals, giving up the lead. The home fans booed him off the field; after the game, Stewart called the fans "idiots" and challenged them to come on to the field and do his job for him. The team's new general manager, Tom Grieve, fined Stewart $500 for his remarks, but that wasn't enough for Rangers owner Eddie Chiles, who demanded that Grieve trade Stewart. After finding a weak market for him, the Rangers finally managed to trade Stewart to the Philadelphia Phillies on September 13, 1985, for pitcher Rick Surhoff. In 42 games for the Rangers in 1985, Stewart was 0–6 with a 5.42 ERA.

=== Philadelphia Phillies ===
In the off-season, he negotiated with the Yomiuri Giants of Nippon Professional Baseball, but they did not agree to terms on a contract so he re-signed with the Phillies.

Stewart appeared in 12 games for the team over parts of the 1985 and 1986 seasons, recording a 6.00 ERA. There were rumors that Stewart had been pitching injured, but the Phillies still released him on May 9, 1986. Stewart later said that the Phillies lied to him, and that they had said if he kept his nose clean he would get somewhere, but instead he was released.

=== Oakland Athletics ===
Stewart had a try-out with the Baltimore Orioles, but they told him they didn't even have a spot for him in Double-A. He wound up signing a free agent contract with the Oakland Athletics on May 23, 1986. After one game with The Triple-A Tacoma Tigers, Stewart joined the A's roster. In a game on July 1, he punched Pat Corrales, the manager of the Cleveland Indians, during a game, which initiated a bench-clearing brawl. He was suspended four games and fined for his actions. Also in 1986, Stewart developed a forkball to supplement his fastball and slider. He pitched in 29 games for the Athletics in 1986, with 17 starts. He was 9–5 with a 3.74 ERA.

Stewart signed a two-year $500,000 contract with the Athletics prior to the 1987 season. He won 20 games in 1987, while posting a 3.68 ERA and striking out 205 batters. He credited pitching coach Dave Duncan with helping improve his pitches. In 1988, he won his first eight games and claimed the Major League Baseball Pitcher of the Month Award. He went 21–12 with a 3.23 ERA, while leading the American League (AL) with 14 complete games and 275 2/3 innings pitched. No MLB pitcher has thrown more innings since Stewart in 1988. Stewart started two games in the A's four-game sweep of the Boston Red Sox in the 1988 American League Championship Series. After the series, his manager Tony La Russa said he had "never met a player or person of higher quality." Stewart was the starting pitcher in game one of the 1988 World Series against the Dodgers. Prior to the game, he told Dodgers' second baseman Steve Sax that he was going to hit him in the neck during the game. He came close, drilling Sax in the left shoulder and glaring at him. He allowed three runs in eight innings and was in line for the win before Kirk Gibson's walk-off homer off closer Dennis Eckersley gave the game to the Dodgers. Working on three days rest, Stewart was not as good in game four, allowing four runs (only two earned) and leaving the game with one out in the sixth to pick up the loss. The Dodgers finished off their championship with a win in Game five.

In 1989, Stewart was 21–9 with a 3.32 ERA in 36 starts. His manager, La Russa, was also the manager of the American League team at the All-Star Game and picked Stewart to start for the AL team over fan favorite Nolan Ryan. He allowed two runs to score in his one inning of work in the game. He finished second in the voting for the American League Cy Young Award to Kansas City Royals pitcher Bret Saberhagen.

In the 1989 American League Championship Series, Stewart won both of the games he pitched with a 2.81 ERA. In the World Series, Stewart pitched a complete-game shutout in the first game against the San Francisco Giants. The series was interrupted when an earthquake struck the Bay Area just prior to the start of Game 3. When the series resumed, 10 days later, Stewart started game three for the A's, and picked up his second win of the series when he allowed three runs in seven innings. The A's swept the series in four games and Stewart was selected as the MVP of the series going 2–0 with a 1.69 ERA. Stewart signed a new two-year $7 million contract extension with the Athletics after the season. This was the largest contract ever in baseball at the time.

In 1990, Stewart was 22–11 (his fourth straight 20-win season and tied for second-most in the majors) with a 2.56 ERA in 36 starts. He led the league in innings pitched (267), complete games (11) and shutouts (4) while being third in ERA and finishing third in the Cy Young voting. On June 29, he no-hit the Toronto Blue Jays, at SkyDome, the first no-hitter by an African American since Jim Bibby in 1973. That same day, Fernando Valenzuela of the Dodgers no-hit the St. Louis Cardinals at Dodger Stadium – the first time in Major League history that no-hitters had been thrown in both leagues on the same day. The A's won their third straight pennant, beating the Boston Red Sox in the American League Championship Series, and Stewart was named the ALCS MVP going 2–0 with a 1.13 ERA. Stewart got the start in Game one of the 1990 World Series for the heavily favored A's against the Cincinnati Reds. However, Eric Davis hit a two-run home run off him in the first inning and he only lasted four innings as the Reds pulled off the upset. He pitched better in game four, allowing only one earned run while pitching a complete game, but the Reds won the game and finished off a sweep of the series. Despite being the losing pitcher in games 1 and 4, Stewart had a 2.77 ERA in the 1990 World Series.

After the 1990 season, Stewart was part of a Major League All-Star team that played an eight-game series in Japan against a Japanese all-star team. He went on the disabled list for the first time in his career in 1991 because of a strained rib muscle, which caused him to miss three weeks of the season. When he returned he was not as dominant as he had been before. His troubles were partly because of an inability to throw his forkball for strikes and as a result he was pitching with less confidence. In 35 starts, Stewart finished 11–11 with a league-high 5.18 ERA in 1991 as the Athletics missed the playoffs for the first time since 1987.

Stewart was bothered by elbow tendinitis for much of the 1992 season but still made 31 starts (his fewest since 1986) and had a 12–10 record and 3.66 ERA. The A's returned to the playoffs, but this time were seen as underdogs to the Toronto Blue Jays in the American League Championship Series. Stewart started the opener of the series and pitched 7.2 innings while allowing only three runs in a game the A's won. The A's lost the next three games and were on the verge of elimination, so he called a team meeting in order to give his teammates a pep talk. He responded by pitching a complete game victory in game five, allowing only two runs. It was the first complete game victory in an ALCS game since Bruce Hurst of the Boston Red Sox pitched one in 1986 against the California Angels. However, the Blue Jays won the next game to take the series and eliminate the A's from the post-season.

=== Toronto Blue Jays ===
Stewart signed a two-year, $8.5 million contract with the Blue Jays on December 8, 1992. He said that he was sad to leave the A's, whom he had envisioned spending the rest of his career with, but he felt the Blue Jays treated him with more respect with their offer. He said that A's general manager Sandy Alderson was disrespectful of him and all he had done for Oakland and was insulted that he was accused of disloyalty when he signed with the Blue Jays.

As a member of the Blue Jays rotation in 1993, Stewart made 26 starts and was 12–8 with a 4.44 ERA. He suffered from a number of injuries during the season, but the Blue Jays stuck with him because of his heart and competitiveness, as well as the support he offered to other pitchers on the staff. The Blue Jays made it to the ALCS where Stewart started in Game 2. He allowed only one run in six innings of work to pick up the win. The day before his next start, while the rest of his team was already in Chicago, he was in Toronto helping the Salvation Army deliver food to the homeless on Thanksgiving Day in Canada. He made it to the game on time, and pitched 7 1/3 innings for his second win of the series, in the clinching Game 6 that sent the Blue Jays back to the World Series. He was selected as ALCS MVP for the second time in his career. In the World Series against the Philadelphia Phillies, Stewart started Game 2 but struggled, allowing five runs in six innings to take a rare postseason loss. Nevertheless, he was confident heading into his next start, in Game 6, saying he was pitching for respect as much as for another championship. He allowed four runs in six innings, but that was enough as the Blue Jays, thanks to a three-run walk-off homer by Joe Carter, won the game 8–6 and with it took the series, 4 games to 2.

Stewart remained with the Blue Jays for the 1994 season, making 22 starts for them with a 7–8 record and 5.87 ERA before the 1994–95 MLB strike wiped out the rest of the season in August (and delayed the start of the next season). He had planned to retire at the end of the season but was bothered by the lack of empathy on the part of the fans toward the players. He would later say that he never felt the same passion for baseball after the strike.

=== Oakland Athletics (second stint) and retirement ===
When the strike ended, Stewart re-signed with the Athletics on April 8, 1995. He was their opening day starter on April 26, 1995. However, he could not recapture his prior form. Stewart was rocked for nine runs and was removed from the game with only one out in the second inning. In 16 starts, he was 3–7 with a 6.89 ERA, prompting manager La Russa to announce that Stewart would move to the bullpen for the first time since 1986 and be replaced in the rotation by Todd van Poppel. Stewart chose to retire rather than become a reliever. He made the public announcement on July 24, 1995, saying it was a low point in his life and he just couldn't perform like he wanted to anymore.

Over his career, he started 18 postseason games, compiling a stellar 2.84 ERA and 10–6 (10–4 as a starter) record. In the LCS, he was especially dominant, going 8–0.

== Post-playing career ==
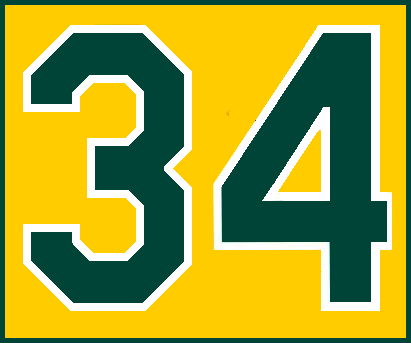
Dave Stewart's number 34 was retired by the Oakland Athletics in 2022.

Stewart served as the assistant to Sandy Alderson, the general manager of the Athletics, in 1996. In 1997, he left that position to serve in a similar capacity under Kevin Towers of the San Diego Padres. In 1998, he agreed to become the Padres' pitching coach, despite some worry that it would detract from his goal of becoming a GM and some personal conflict between him and team president Larry Lucchino. He turned around a pitching staff that had been awful the year before and helped get the team into the World Series. Several of the Padres pitchers, including Andy Ashby, Sterling Hitchcock and Joey Hamilton, credited Stewart directly with the improvement of the staff. He maintained some of his front office duties, including running the Latin America scouting department, during the season and often remarked that he would leave for the right front office position.

Stewart left San Diego after the season and interviewed for assistant GM positions with Oakland and the Florida Marlins. He was a finalist to replace Frank Wren in Florida, but his concern about the high crime rate in South Florida led him to turn down the position. His familiarity with the Blue Jays organization was the main reason he accepted the job there under Gord Ash. When the Blue Jays fired pitching coach Rick Langford in the middle of the 2000 season, Stewart moved into the position on July 24. After the 2001 season, when the Blue Jays had an opening at general manager, they passed on Stewart, hiring J. P. Ricciardi instead. Stewart chose to resign from his dual role as pitching coach and assistant GM. He was outspoken about the fact that he felt minorities were being discriminated against in the front office and that the decision by team president Paul Godfrey was racist. Frustrated, he said, "I think the whole process is a waste of time."

He joined the Milwaukee Brewers as their pitching coach for the 2002 season under manager Davey Lopes. After the team started 3–12, Lopes was fired and Stewart was a candidate to replace him, but it instead went to bench coach Jerry Royster. He resigned on July 29, 2002 to care for his mother and spend more time with family. After leaving that position, he was the pitching coach for the United States national team at the Olympic qualifying tournament.

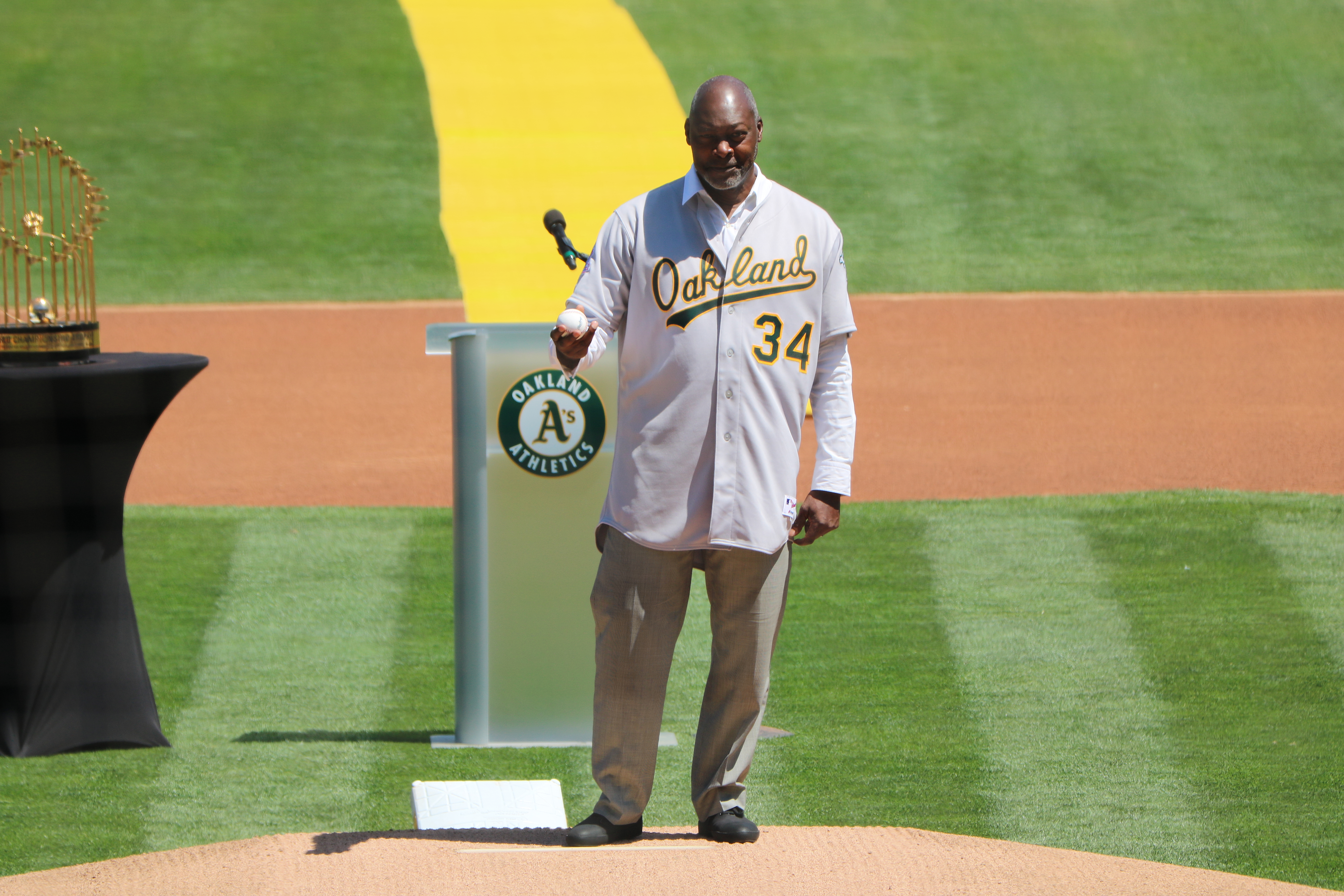
Stewart in 2019 after throwing a first pitch for the A's.

Stewart started a sports agency called Sports Management Partners. His first big deal was negotiating a six-year, $66 million contract extension between the A's and third baseman Eric Chavez. He also negotiated contracts for Matt Kemp and Chad Billingsley.

On September 25, 2014, the Arizona Diamondbacks hired Stewart to become their general manager, replacing Towers. He was the fourth GM hired by the team since 2010. He reported to La Russa, his former manager in Oakland, who served as the Diamondbacks' chief baseball officer. He transferred his sports agent company to former A's teammate Dave Henderson and his wife, Lonnie Murray, when he took the Diamondbacks job. On December 4, 2015, the Diamondbacks agreed to a six-year contract with free agent pitcher Zack Greinke worth a total of $206.5 million. At that time, it held the highest annual average value in MLB, exceeding $34.4 million per year, and was also the largest contract by total value in team history. Stewart later said of the contract, "It could be franchise-changing for us, if everything goes well." Five days later, Arizona traded for Shelby Miller and Gabe Speier, sending Dansby Swanson, Ender Inciarte, and Aaron Blair to the Atlanta Braves.

The Diamondbacks went 79–83 in 2015 and 69–93 in 2016 with Stewart as general manager. On October 3, 2016, team owners fired Stewart and manager Chip Hale, who was hired around the same time as Stewart.

Stewart was about to have his #34 jersey retired by the Oakland Athletics in 2020, but the ceremony was postponed until further notice, due to the COVID-19 pandemic; the lack of plans in 2021 prompted questions from fans and even Stewart himself in April 2022 before it was announced that Stewart will have his jersey retired by the Athletics on September 11, 2022. Stewart would break the A's tradition in that his number would be a re-retirement, as well as his not being in the Hall of Fame.

In 2021, following the Dodgers victory in the 2020 World Series, Stewart said he would not be attending the 40th anniversary celebration of the Dodgers’ 1981 World Series championship because of how he believed the team mishandled the Trevor Bauer sexual assault allegations by waiting an entire week to put him on administrative leave.

On January 22, 2025, Stewart rejoined the Athletics front office, serving as special assistant to player development director Ed Sprague Jr.

== Personal life ==
Stewart and his ex-wife, Vanessa, have two children, Adrian and Alyse. Stewart is married to sports agent and business partner Lonnie Murray. They live in Poway, California.

In 1985, Stewart was arrested on suspicion of lewd conduct with a prostitute later revealed to be a trans woman. After pleading no contest to a lesser charge of soliciting a prostitute, Stewart received a fine, probation, and a suspended sentence. Two days after the arrest, Stewart was honored with the Good Guys award from Dallas-Fort Worth sportswriters. Accepting the award, he admitted both his guilt and that he was ashamed.

In 1994, Stewart and teammate Todd Stottlemyre stood trial for seven days in Hillsborough County, Florida on charges of battery on a law enforcement officer and resisting arrest with violence. Stewart also faced charges of disorderly conduct. Stewart was accused of punching a police officer in the face at a club. The jury deliberated for 36 minutes before finding the pitchers not guilty.

== See also ==
- Black Aces, African-American pitchers with a 20-win MLB season
- List of Major League Baseball annual wins leaders
- List of Major League Baseball no-hitters
- Major League Baseball titles leaders

Preceded by Frank Viola	American League All-Star Game Starting Pitcher; 1989	Succeeded by Bob Welch
Preceded by Nolan Ryan	No-hitter pitcher June 29, 1990	Succeeded by Fernando Valenzuela
Preceded by Kevin Towers	Arizona Diamondbacks General manager 2014–2016	Succeeded by Mike Hazen
