= List of New York Mets owners and executives =

The New York Mets are a Major League Baseball (MLB) franchise based in Queens, in New York City. They play in the National League East division. In the team's history, the Mets have employed 16 general managers (GMs) (not including interim GMs). The GM controls player transactions, hiring and firing of the coaching staff, and negotiates with players and agents regarding contracts. The longest-tenured GM is Frank Cashen, who held the position for 11 years (1980–1990). The Mets owner is currently Steve Cohen.

== Table key ==
† or ‡	Elected to the National Baseball Hall of Fame and Museum (‡ denotes induction as manager)
§	Member of the New York Mets Hall of Fame

== Owners ==
=== Historical majority shareholders ===
- Joan Whitney Payson (1962–1975)
- Charles Shipman Payson (1975–1980)
- Doubleday & Co. (1980–1986)
- Nelson Doubleday Jr. & Fred Wilpon (1986–2002)
- Sterling Equities (2002–2020)
- Steven A. Cohen (2020–present)

=== Current ownership ===
Since October 30, 2020, Steve Cohen is the principal owner of the Mets, with a 95% majority share with the team. Sterling Equities, an entity owned by Fred Wilpon and Saul Katz, owns the retaining 5%.

== General managers ==
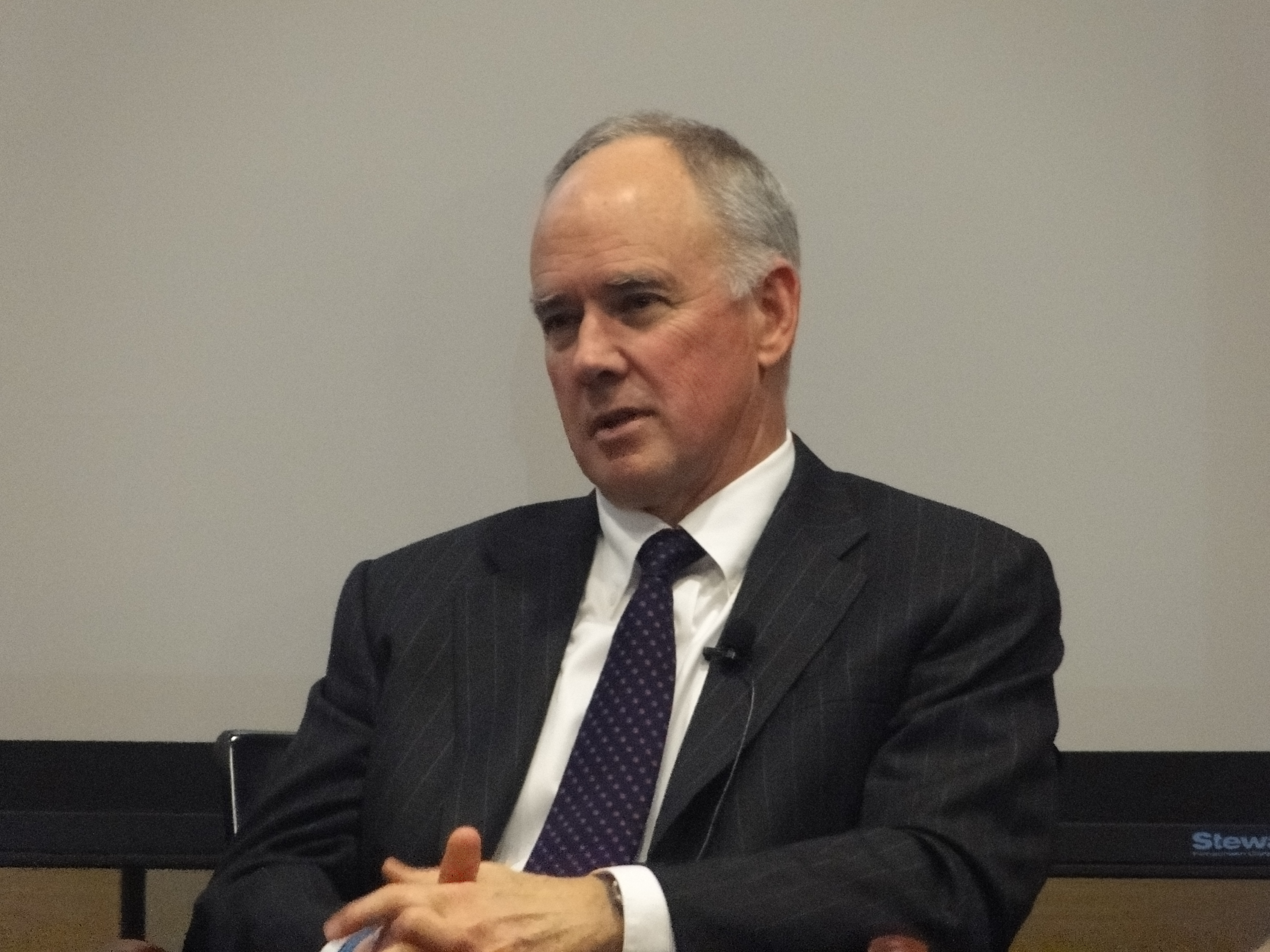
Sandy Alderson, general manager of the Mets from 2011 to 2018

#^{[a]}	Name	Seasons	Ref
1	George Weiss^{‡§}	1962–1966	
2	Bing Devine	1967	
3	Johnny Murphy^{§}	1968–1969	
4	Bob Scheffing	1970–1974	
5	Joe McDonald	1975–1979	
6	Frank Cashen^{§}	1980– 1991	
7	Al Harazin	1992– 1993	
8	Joe McIlvaine	1994–1997	
9	Steve Phillips	1997	
—	Frank Cashen (interim)	1998	
10	Steve Phillips	1998–2003	
11	Jim Duquette	2003-2004	
12	Omar Minaya	2005–2010	
—	John Ricco (interim)	2010	
13	Sandy Alderson	2010–2018	
—	John Ricco (interim, as part of triumvirate)	2018	
—	Omar Minaya (interim, as part of triumvirate)	2018	
—	J. P. Ricciardi (interim, as part of triumvirate)	2018	
14	Brodie Van Wagenen	2018–2020	
15	Jared Porter	2020–2021	
—	Zack Scott (interim)	2021	
—	Sandy Alderson (interim)	2021	
16	Billy Eppler	2021–2023	
17	David Stearns	2024–present	

== Other executives ==
- Rubén Amaro Jr.
- Chris Christie
- Paul DePodesta
- M. Donald Grant
- Whitey Herzog
- Jay Horwitz
- Gerry Hunsicker
- Saul Katz
- Wid Matthews
- Kevin Morgan
- J. P. Ricciardi
- Jeff Wilpon
- Jack Zduriencik
- David Stearns

== Footnotes ==
- ^{a} #: A running total of the number of Mets' GMs. Thus, any GM who has two or more separate terms is only counted once.
- Assistant GM John Ricco served as interim GM following the dismissal of Minaya on October 4, 2010. He returned to Asst. GM on October 29, when Alderson was hired.
