= David Wright =

American baseball player (born 1982)

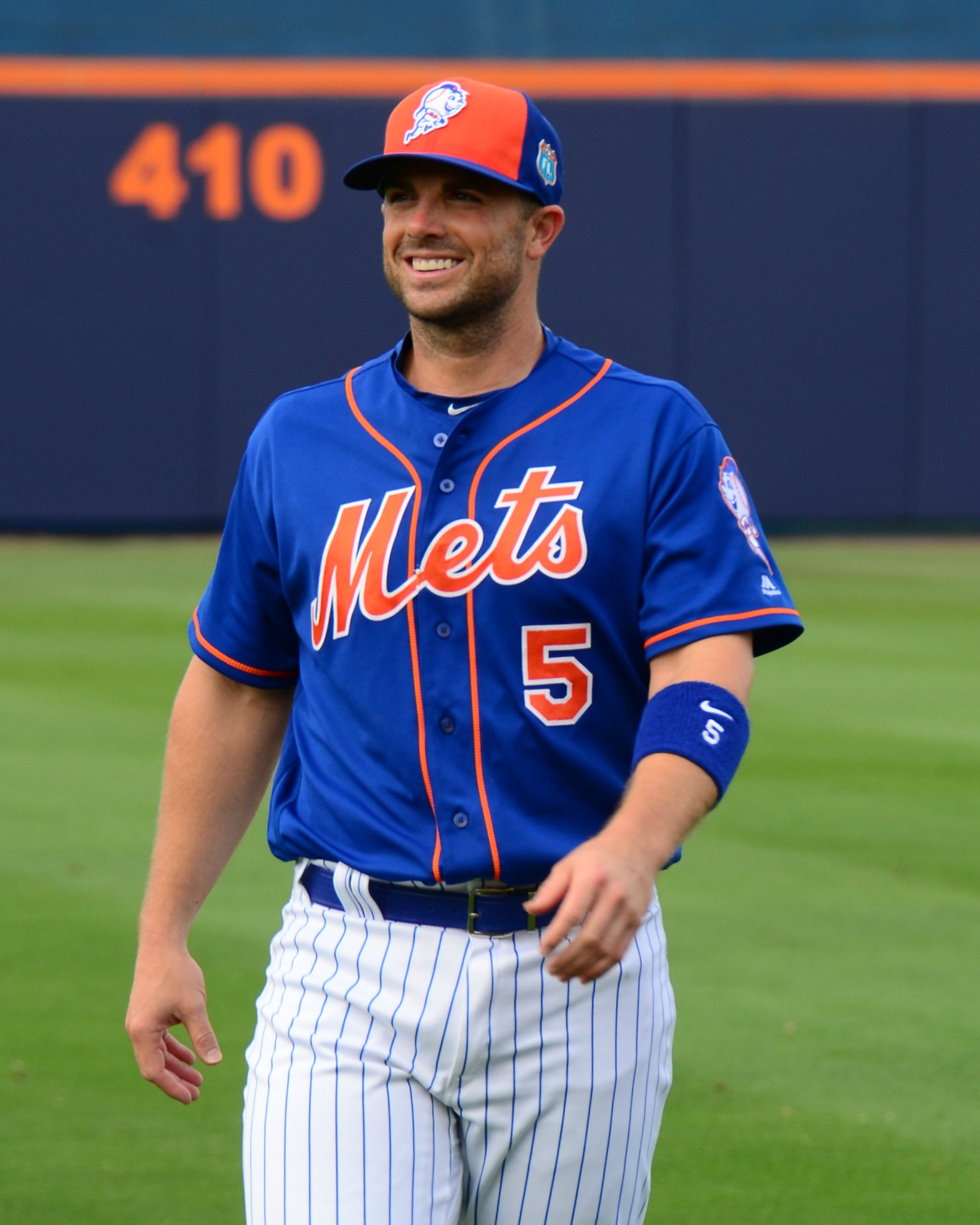
- Wright with the New York Mets in 2016
- Third baseman
- Born: December 20, 1982 (age 43); Norfolk, Virginia, U.S.
- Batted: Right Threw: Right

MLB debut
- July 21, 2004, for the New York Mets

Last MLB appearance
- September 29, 2018, for the New York Mets

MLB statistics
- Batting average: .296
- Home runs: 242
- Runs batted in: 970
- Stats at Baseball Reference

Teams
- New York Mets (2004–2016, 2018)

Career highlights and awards
- 7× All-Star (2006–2010, 2012, 2013); 2× Gold Glove Award (2007, 2008); 2× Silver Slugger Award (2007, 2008); New York Mets No. 5 retired; New York Mets Hall of Fame

David Allen Wright (born December 20, 1982) is an American former professional baseball third baseman who spent his entire 14-year Major League Baseball (MLB) career with the New York Mets. Chosen by the Mets in the 2001 MLB draft, he made his MLB debut on July 21, 2004 at Shea Stadium. Internationally, Wright represented the United States. Wright was nicknamed "Captain America" after his performance in the 2013 World Baseball Classic where he led the tournament with 10 RBI and a .438 batting average and was named to the All-World Baseball Classic Team.

Wright is a seven-time All-Star, a two-time Gold Glove Award winner, a two-time Silver Slugger Award winner, and a member of the 30–30 club. One of the most beloved players in franchise history, Wright is the Mets' all-time leader in career plate appearances and holds many other franchise records for position players. He was named captain of the Mets in 2013, becoming the fourth captain in the team's history. Wright is the third player to play in at least 10 MLB seasons and play his entire MLB career with the Mets.

Throughout the latter half of Wright's career, he was plagued by injuries, most notably spinal stenosis, as well as additional ailments in his neck and shoulder. After missing significant time from 2015 to 2018 and receiving word from doctors that his spinal stenosis would not improve, Wright announced that 2018 would be his final season as an active player. Wright finished his major league career with a .296 career batting average, 242 home runs, and 970 runs batted in. Upon completion of his playing career, Wright was named a special advisor in the Mets front office.

== Early life ==
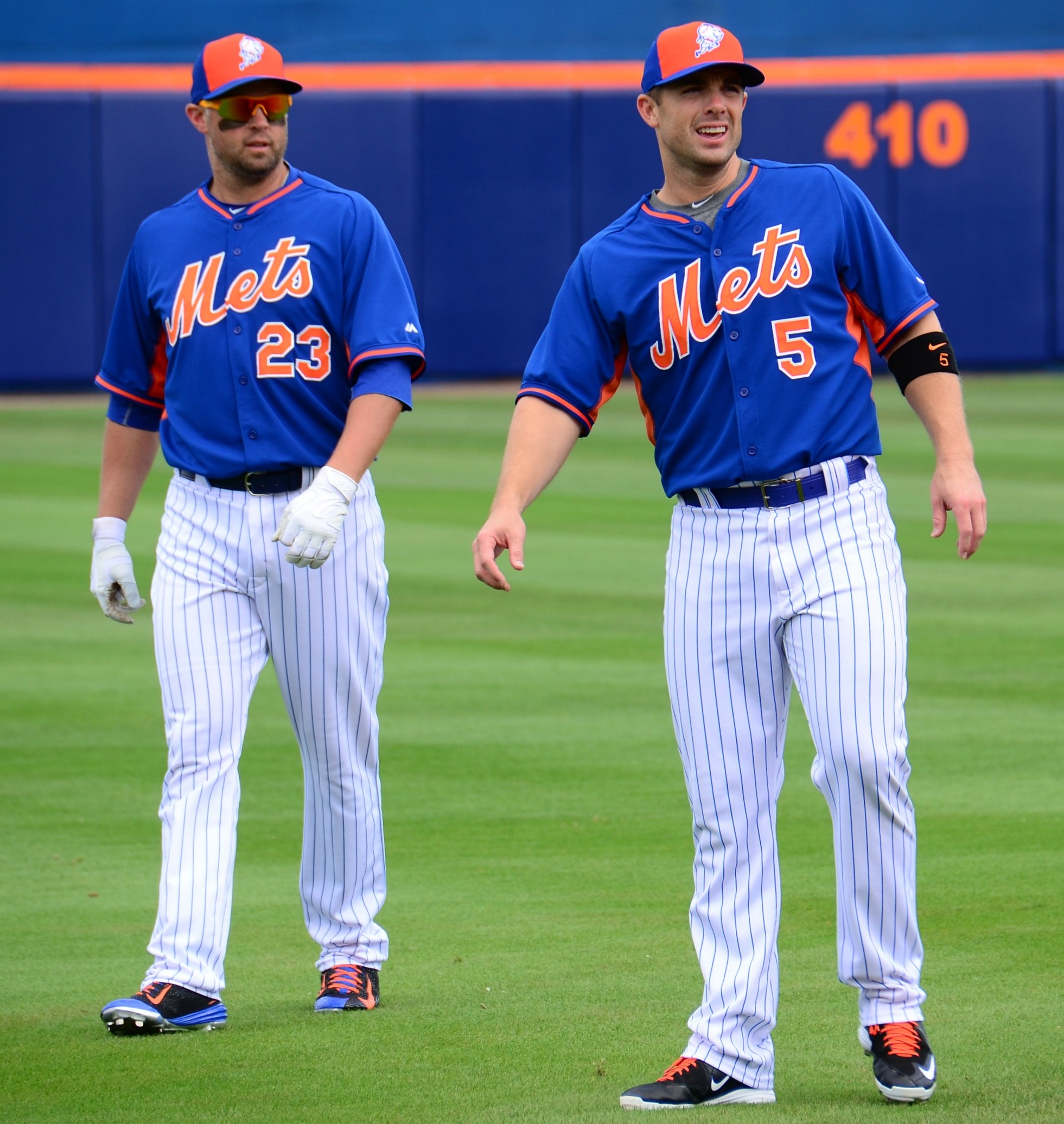
Wright (right) and Michael Cuddyer played baseball together as children in Virginia before playing together on the Mets in 2015.

David Allen Wright was born on December 20, 1982, in Norfolk, Virginia, the oldest of four sons of Rhon, a police officer in the Norfolk Police Department, and Elisa Wright. Wright grew up a Mets fan due to his proximity to the Class AAA Norfolk Tides, whose stadium was ten minutes from his home. Wright took hitting lessons alongside fellow future Major Leaguer Michael Cuddyer in elementary school and played on teams with Ryan Zimmerman, Mark Reynolds, B. J. Upton and Justin Upton during high school. Wright played baseball at Hickory High School in Chesapeake, Virginia. He committed to play college baseball at Georgia Tech before his senior year of high school. As a high school senior, he had a .538 batting average.

== Professional career ==
=== Draft and minor leagues ===
The New York Mets selected Wright in the 2001 MLB draft during the supplemental round as compensation for the Mets' loss of Mike Hampton to the Colorado Rockies in free agency. Wright was selected after future teammate Aaron Heilman, who had been selected in the first round. According to then-Mets manager Bobby Valentine, Wright had caught the attention of coach Tom Robson who had actually been sent "down to Virginia to scout someone else."

Wright progressed steadily in his first three years of minor league play, winning the Sterling award for best player on the class A St. Lucie Mets in 2003. In 2004, he quickly rose from the Double-A Binghamton Mets to the Triple-A Norfolk Tides to the major leagues.

=== New York Mets (2004–2016, 2018) ===
==== 2004 ====
On July 21, 2004, Wright made his major league debut starting at third base against the Montreal Expos at Shea Stadium. The next day, Wright picked up his first career hit, a double off of Expos' pitcher Zach Day. On July 26, Wright hit his first major league home run, a solo blast off of pitcher John Patterson. Wright finished his rookie season with a .293 batting average, 14 home runs, and 40 RBI in 263 at-bats in 69 games, and was voted as the This Year in Baseball Awards Rookie of the Year.

==== 2005 ====
Wright made an over-the-shoulder barehanded catch during the seventh inning of a game at Petco Park against the San Diego Padres on August 9, 2005. With one out in the inning, Brian Giles hit a broken-bat blooper 20 feet (6.1 m) beyond the edge of the outfield grass. Wright, retreating quickly with his back to home plate, extended his bare right hand and caught the ball cleanly while crashing to the field. Wright maintained control of the ball after landing hard on the outfield grass. The sellout crowd at Petco Park acknowledged the splendor of the catch with a standing ovation lasting several minutes. This play was voted the "This Year in Baseball Play of the Year."

In 2005, the 22-year-old Wright played in 160 games and batted .306 with 27 home runs, 102 RBIs, 99 runs scored, 42 doubles, and 17 stolen bases, leading the team in average, runs, on-base percentage, slugging percentage, RBI, doubles, and finishing second in home runs to Cliff Floyd (34). Wright was also in the top 10 in the National League for average, hits, total bases, RBI, extra-base hits, and runs. However, his 24 errors tied him with Troy Glaus for the most errors by a third baseman in the major leagues.

==== 2006 ====
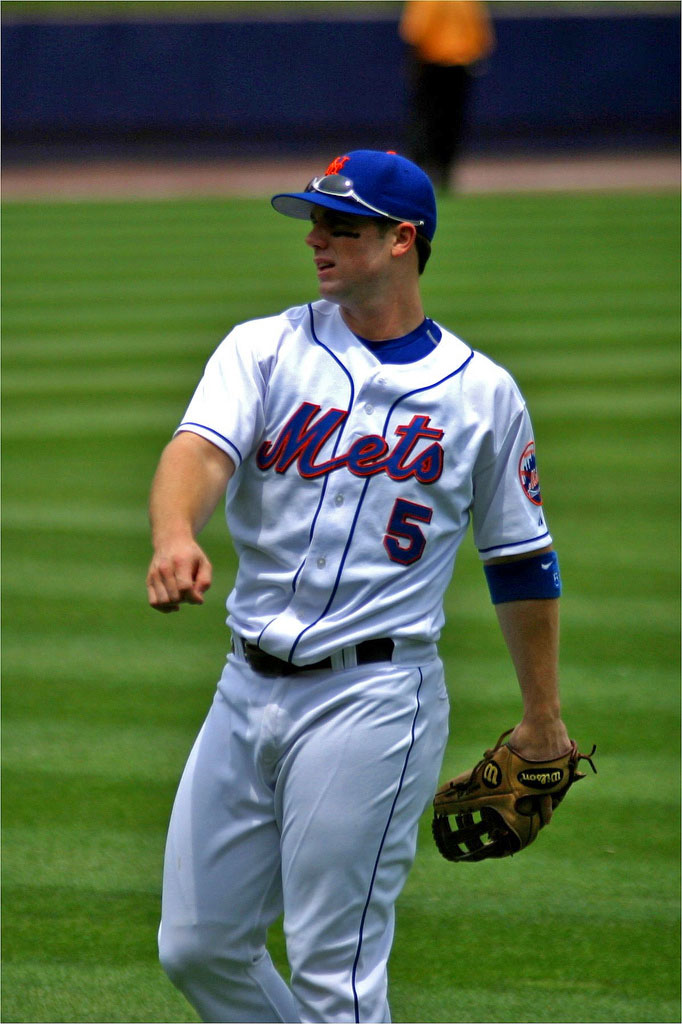
Wright with the Mets in 2006

In 2006, Wright was named National League Co-Player of the Week for June 12–18 along with teammate José Reyes. For the month, Wright batted .327 with 10 home runs and 29 RBIs.

Wright also provided his share of heroics throughout the 2006 season. His first game-winning hit occurred on May 5 with a 2-out double just out of the reach of a chasing Andruw Jones in the bottom of the 14th inning off Jorge Sosa to defeat the Atlanta Braves, 8–7. Two weeks later on May 19, he hit a walk-off single off Yankees closer Mariano Rivera that just sailed over the head of center fielder Johnny Damon as the Mets rallied to beat the Yankees in the first game of the 2006 Subway Series, 7–6. He capped off the month on Memorial Day, May 29, with a single to the wall in left-center field off Arizona Diamondbacks closer José Valverde scoring José Reyes from first base as the Mets defeated Arizona, 8–7. Wright also made a game-saving stop at third base of a would-be game-tying single by Mike Lieberthal for the final out of a 4–3 Mets victory over the Philadelphia Phillies on August 5.

Wright was voted into his first MLB All-Star Game as the starting third baseman for the NL. During the 2006 season, Wright collected 74 RBIs before the All-Star break, breaking the Mets record previously held by Mike Piazza, who had 72 RBIs in 2000. Wright also participated in the 2006 Home Run Derby, reaching the final round but finishing second to Ryan Howard of the Philadelphia Phillies. He hit 22 home runs in the contest, including 16 in the first round, the third-highest total in any one round in the history of the Home Run Derby. The following night, he hit a home run in his first All-Star Game at-bat off American League starter Kenny Rogers.

Wright ranked among the club's top three hitters in all offensive categories for the 2006 Mets, who were the second most run-scoring team in the National League. Fans at Shea Stadium have routinely greeted Wright's performances with chants of "M-V-P, M-V-P." According to then-teammate Tom Glavine, "He's probably been our most clutch hitter over the first half of the season and he's certainly thrown his hat into the MVP talks."

On August 6, 2006, Wright signed a 6-year, $55 million contract extension with the Mets, as well as a $1.5 million signing bonus. The contract paid him $1 million in 2007, $5 million in 2008, $7.5 million in 2009, $10 million in 2010, $14 million in 2011, and $15 million in 2012. The contract also contained a club option for 2013 worth $16 million. Wright has already announced that he will donate $1.5 million to the Mets Foundation throughout this contract.

The Mets clinched the NL East title in 2006 and returned to the playoffs for the first time since 2000. Wright finished the 2006 season batting .311 with 26 home runs, 116 RBI, 40 doubles, and 20 stolen bases in 154 games played. However, he struggled in his first postseason, going 4-for-25 (.160) in the Mets' NLCS loss to the St. Louis Cardinals, and batting .216 in 10 postseason games.

After the season, Wright participated in the 2006 MLB Japan All-Star Series along with teammates José Reyes, Julio Franco, and John Maine.

==== 2007 ====
As of April 21, 2007, Wright had a hitting streak of 26 regular-season games; the previous team record was 24, held by Mike Piazza and Hubie Brooks. He had a hit in the 12 final regular-season games of the 2006 season, and had a hit in all of the first 14 games of the 2007 season. Wright's hit streak of 26 regular-season games ended on April 21, 2007, against the Atlanta Braves at Shea Stadium.

On September 16, 2007, Wright became the 29th player in baseball history to join the 30–30 club, after hitting a 7th inning solo home run against the Philadelphia Phillies at Shea Stadium. He is only the third player to reach this milestone before his 25th birthday, and only the third Met to reach this milestone in club history, the other two being Howard Johnson and Darryl Strawberry.

Wright finished the 2007 season with a .325 batting average, 30 home runs, 107 RBI, and 34 stolen bases. He was awarded the 2007 Gold Glove and the Silver Slugger Award at third base. Wright also was fourth in the NL MVP voting receiving 182 votes.

==== 2008 ====
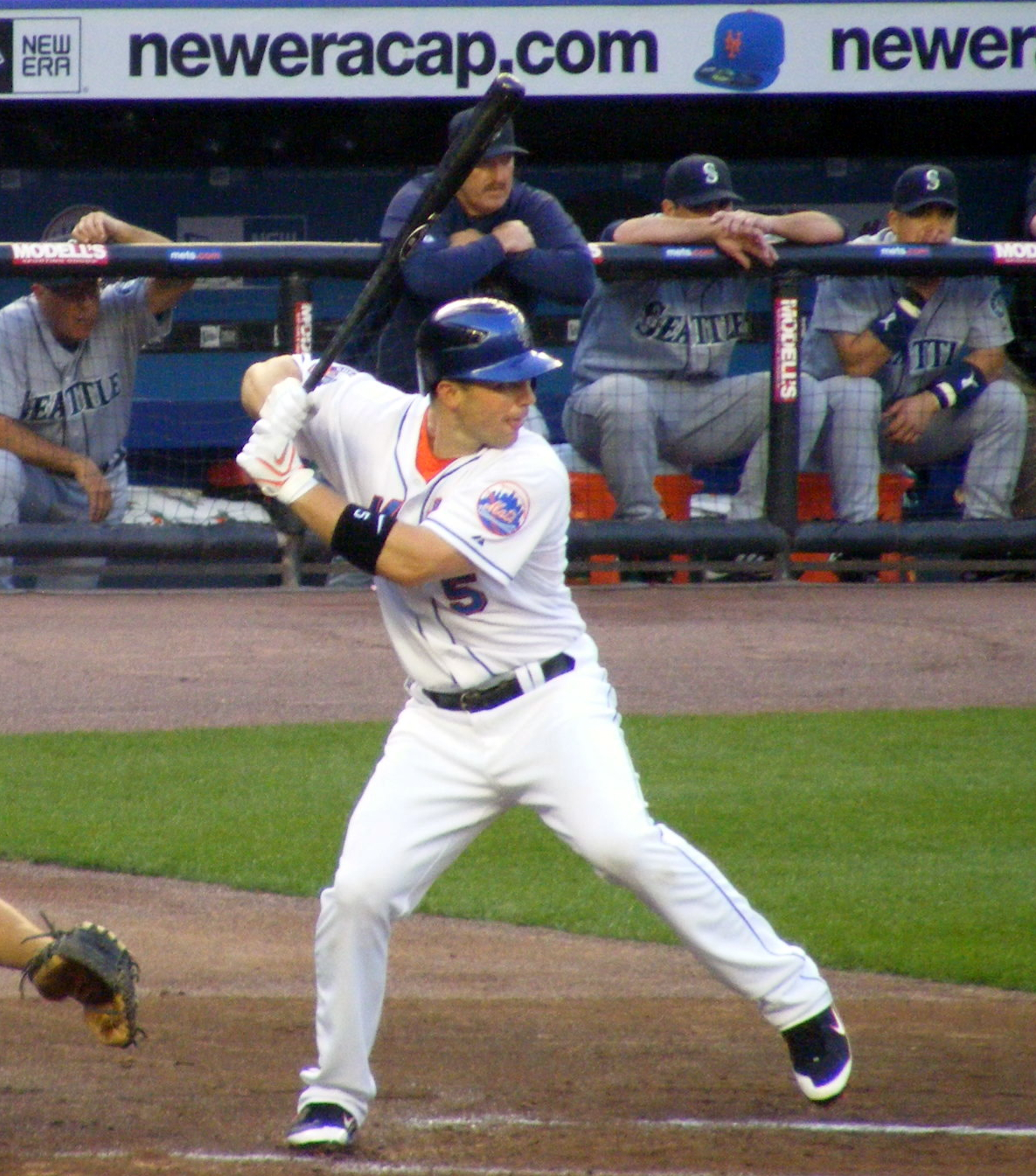
Wright with the Mets in 2008

Wright began the year with two doubles, including a bases-clearing double, in finishing 2–4 with three RBIs in the Mets' Opening Day victory over the Florida Marlins, 7–2. With the RBIs, Wright was already halfway to matching his RBI production from the preceding April. In the final game of the series, Wright went 3–5 with a home run. On April 13, 2008, Wright hit his 100th career home run, a solo shot off of Milwaukee Brewers pitcher Jeff Suppan.

On August 7, Wright hit the first walk-off home run of his career against the San Diego Padres, giving the Mets a 5–3 victory.

On November 5, Wright was announced as the recipient of the Gold Glove Award for third basemen. It was the second consecutive year in which Wright won the award. His teammate, Carlos Beltrán, also won the award for center fielders. He also won his second Silver Slugger Award.

On December 22, Wright was announced as a member of Team USA in the 2009 World Baseball Classic (WBC) to be held in March 2009. The third base position was taken by Alex Rodriguez in the 2006 WBC.

Wright finished seventh in the voting for the 2008 NL MVP award after finishing the season with a .302 batting average, 33 home runs and 124 RBI.

==== 2009 ====
On April 13, 2009, Wright hit the first Mets home run in Citi Field history on Opening Day. The three-run homer was hit off San Diego Padres pitcher Walter Silva in the 5th inning.

In mid-August, when 10 Mets players were on the disabled list, Wright was added to the list after sustaining an injury on August 15. Wright suffered a concussion when he was hit in the head with a 93 mph (150 km/h) fastball by San Francisco Giants pitcher Matt Cain. He was admitted to the Hospital for Special Surgery, where he underwent a precautionary CT scan, which turned out negative. The following day, he left the hospital diagnosed with post-concussion symptoms. He was then placed on the disabled list for the first time in his career.

Despite the injury to Wright, General Manager Omar Minaya stated that there were no plans to shut him down for the remainder of the season. In fact, Wright was activated from the disabled list on September 1 and started at third base against the Colorado Rockies that evening. In that game, Wright wore a new style of batting helmet (the Rawlings S100). He abandoned that helmet after wearing it in that one game. Wright explained that he found the helmet uncomfortable. "It's the last thing I need to be worrying about in the box is trying to shove it on my head. So I wanted to go back to the old one and just wait to see if there's going to be any adjustments made." Wright experienced a decline in production after a potent campaign in 2008. His home run total dropped to 10, while his RBI total fell to 72, after hitting 33 home runs and 124 RBIs the previous season.

==== 2010 ====
Wright, along with José Reyes, arrived at the Mets' spring training camp in Port St. Lucie, Florida two weeks early to get a head start on preparing themselves after a disappointing 2009 campaign. Wright came into camp heavier than he was in previous seasons, adding more muscle to his body.

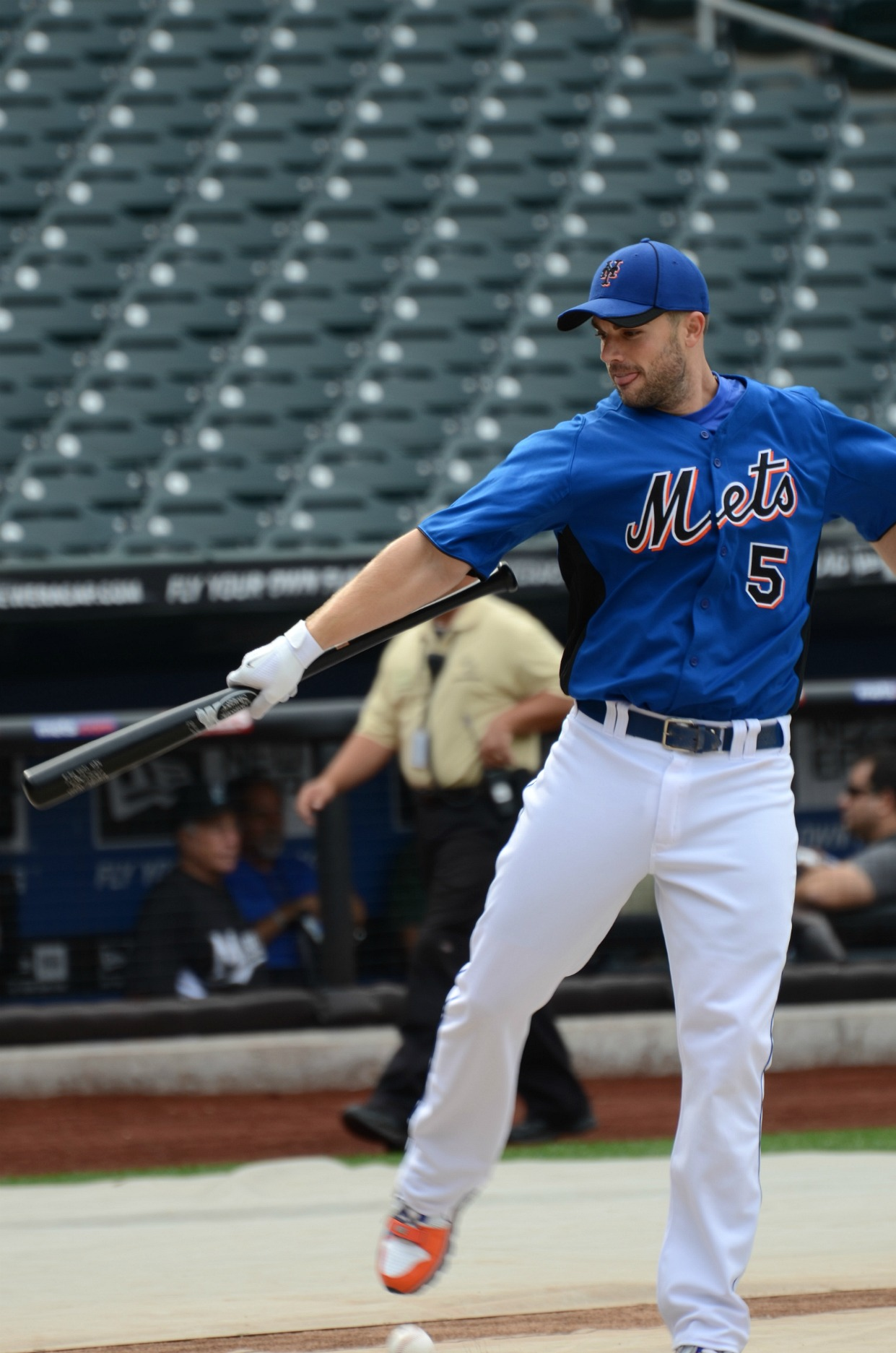
Wright with the Mets in 2011

On Opening Day, Wright hit a two-run home run off Marlins' pitcher Josh Johnson in his first at-bat of the season. On April 27 in the second game of a doubleheader against the Los Angeles Dodgers, Wright hit the 1,000th hit of his career against pitcher Ramón Troncoso in the bottom of the 5th inning as he hit a two-out RBI single scoring center fielder Ángel Pagán and giving the Mets a 4–3 lead. In the following inning, Wright hit a three-run triple to the right-center field wall, scoring Pagán, Luis Castillo, and José Reyes, and giving the Mets a 10–3 lead at the time. The Mets won the game 10–5. On May 20, he hit a three-run double after Mets manager Jerry Manuel gave Wright a day off. By June 25, Wright had 12 home runs, which led the team, and was batting .294 with 57 RBIs to lead the N.L. On July 4, Wright was named the starting third baseman for the National League in the 2010 MLB All-Star Game, making it Wright's fifth consecutive All-Star appearance. On July 6, Wright was named the June 2010 National League Player of the Month after he hit .404 with 11 doubles, 6 home runs, and 29 RBIs. On July 13, Wright collected 2 hits and a stolen base in the 81st All-Star Game in Anaheim, bringing him to 6-for-13 in All-Star Game at-bats and tying him for fifth all-time in All-Star Game batting average. As of August 20, he has more than doubled his home run total from 2009.

Wright finished the 2010 season with a .283 batting average, .354 on-base percentage, 29 home runs, 103 RBIs, 69 walks, and 19 stolen bases.

==== 2011 ====
On April 5, 2011, Wright singled against the Phillies' Cole Hamels for his 90th career game-winning RBI, surpassing Mike Piazza for the most in Mets history. Then on May 16, after undergoing examination by team doctors, it was announced Wright had a stress fracture in his lower back. The injury (caused by a diving tag on the Houston Astros' Carlos Lee) forced him to spend more than two months on the disabled list. Wright was activated from the DL on July 22. That day, he went 2-for-5 and had two RBIs and scored two runs against the Marlins. In his first series coming back from the DL, Wright hit 6-for-14, with one home run, three doubles, and six RBIs. Wright enjoyed a career first on August 7, against the Atlanta Braves, playing shortstop for the first time in his professional career due to injuries to José Reyes (hamstring) and Daniel Murphy (MCL). In only 102 games, Wright finished the season with a .254 batting average, .345 on-base percentage, 14 home runs, 61 RBIs, 52 walks, and 13 stolen bases.

==== 2012 ====
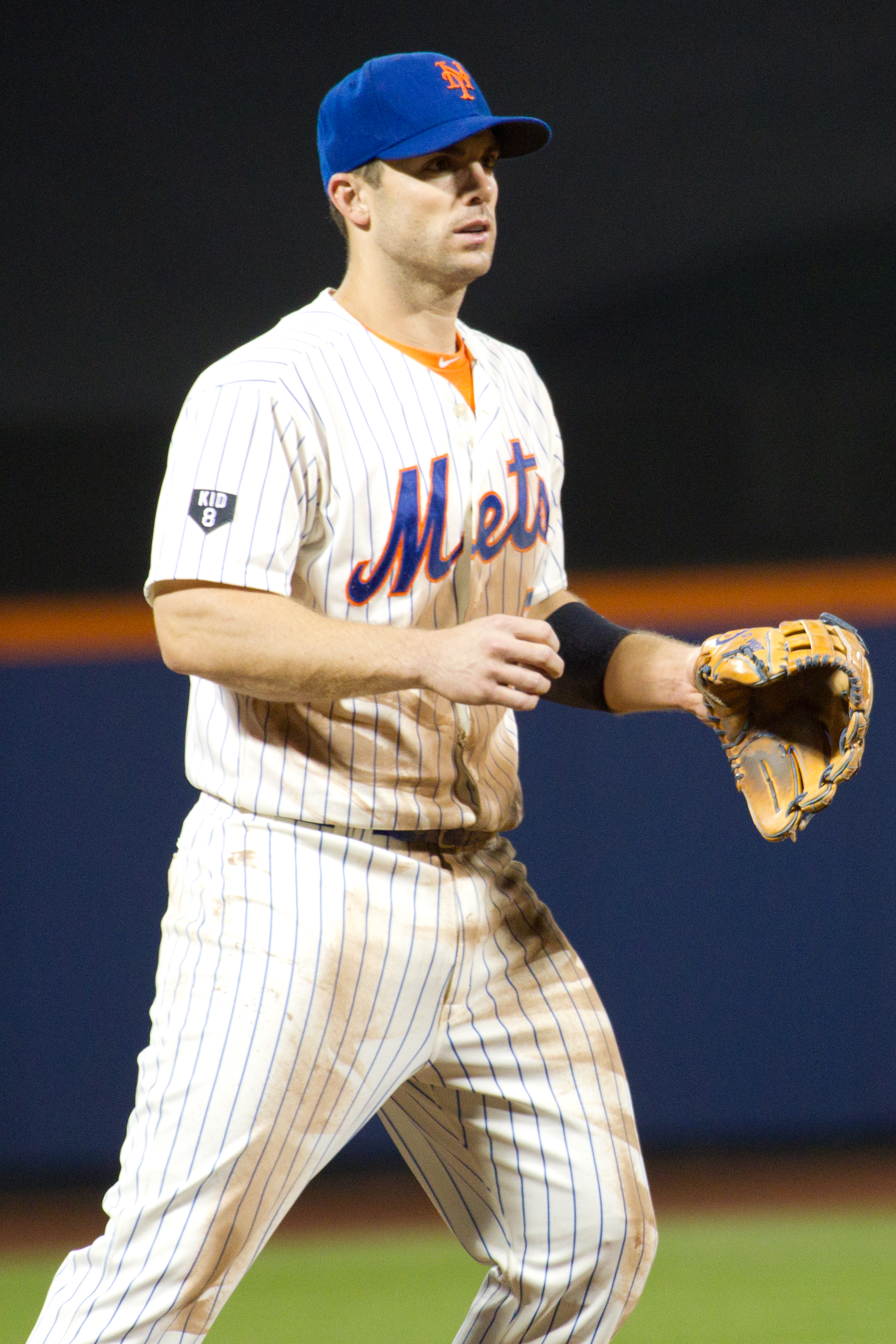
Wright with the Mets in 2012

On April 5, Wright went 2-for-3 with a walk on as the Mets' Opening Day third-baseman against the Braves, where Wright drove in Andrés Torres with a single for the game-winning run in the 6th inning off of Tommy Hanson, giving the Mets the 1–0 win. Less than a week later, on April 11, Wright fractured his right pinkie while diving into first base on a pick-off attempt. After missing just three games, Wright returned to the lineup, going 3-for-5 against the Phillies. Then on April 25, Wright hit a two-run home run in a 5–1 victory against the Miami Marlins, giving him 735 career RBIs, passing Darryl Strawberry for the most in Mets franchise history. Wright broke another franchise record on June 5, when he hit a solo-shot off of Washington Nationals pitcher Jordan Zimmermann, driving himself in and reaching 736 runs. The previous record-holder was José Reyes at 735 runs. On July 1, it was announced that Wright had made his 6th All-Star team, but as a backup to Pablo Sandoval. Wright led the All-Star vote for most of the year but was overtaken in the last week of voting.

For the first half of the season, Wright was either atop or close to the top of the league in both batting average and on-base percentage, and led NL third basemen in average, OBP, slugging, hits and runs scored. After the All-Star break, the Mets had their worst stretch to that point in the season, losing six straight, but on July 19, Wright hit two home runs and had five RBIs to help the Mets end their losing streak. He hit his 200th career home run in a loss on August 24 to the Houston Astros. On September 25, Wright tied the all-time Mets hit record with Ed Kranepool with 1,418 hits in a game at home against the Pittsburgh Pirates. Then on September 26, Wright surpassed Kranepool as Mets all-time hit record holder with an infield single also at home against the Pirates.

After the season, Wright finished 6th in the voting for the 2012 NL MVP Award.

==== Contract extension ====
On November 30, 2012, Ed Coleman and WFAN reported that Wright and the Mets agreed to a seven-year, $138 million contract extension (7 years for $122 million plus a club option for $16 million that the club picked up for the 2013 season). The contract became official on December 4 after Wright passed a physical. Wright was represented in negotiations by Seth and Sam Levinson of ACES Inc.

Wright's $138 million deal was contrary to the Mets' budget-conscious policy of not giving huge contracts to players in their 30s; nonetheless, general manager Sandy Alderson made an exception as he viewed Wright as a leader and role model, both on and off the field. At the same time, many agents and front-office executives suggested that had Wright waited a year and became a free agent, he could have received a deal close to $200 million. Although it had been six years since the Mets' last playoff appearance and four years since their last winning season, Alderson managed to persuade Wright to stay as the Mets' farm system had young talented pitchers.

Wright's contract had deferments that would be paid out through 2025. The Mets obtained injury insurance on the contract which kicked in after he missed 60 days, allowing the team to recoup 75 percent of his salary while he is unable to play.

==== 2013 ====
After a spring training game on March 21, 2013, the Mets announced that Wright had been named the fourth team captain in Mets history, joining Keith Hernandez, Gary Carter, and John Franco.

Wright got his 1,500th career hit on June 18 against the Atlanta Braves off of pitcher Cory Gearrin.

Wright was named the National League's Home Run Derby team captain for the 2013 MLB All-Star Game. He selected Carlos González, Michael Cuddyer, and Bryce Harper as the other three participants for the National League. González, who was injured at the time, was later replaced by Pedro Álvarez. Wright would hit five home runs in the Derby, but would not move on.

On July 6, Wright was named the starting third baseman for the National League team in the 2013 MLB All-Star Game. In the All-Star Game, Wright went 1-for-3. He also became the fourth Mets player to appear in at least seven All-Star games.

On August 3, Wright was placed on the 15-day disabled list a day after he strained his right hamstring. Upon his return from the disabled list, Wright hit two home runs in his first two games, surpassing Mike Piazza for the second-most home runs hit by a player in a Mets uniform, behind Darryl Strawberry. Wright played in 112 games in 2013, batting .307 with 18 home runs, 58 RBIs, and 17 steals.

==== 2014 ====
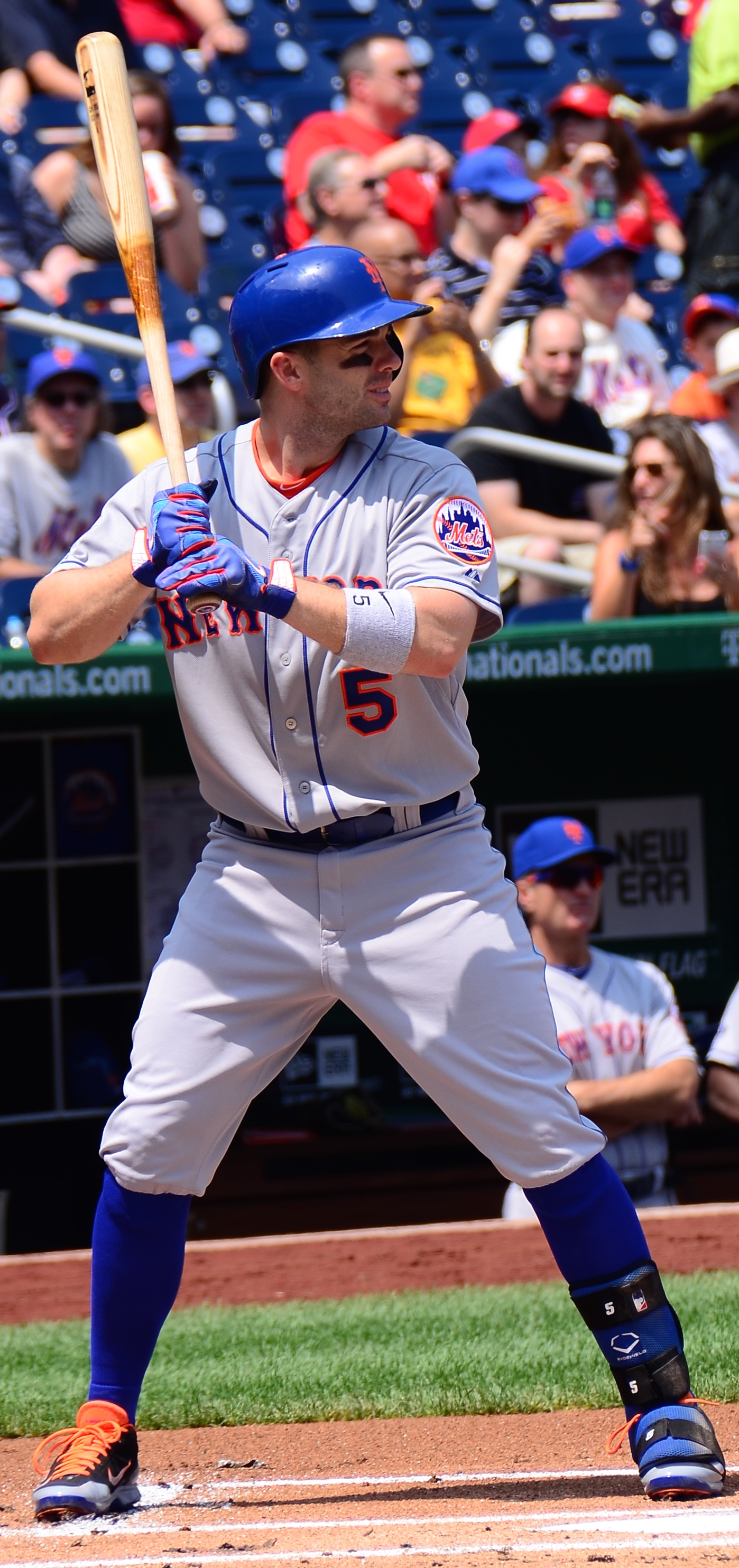
Wright with the Mets in 2014

Wright was chosen as the "Face of MLB" in an online contest in February 2014. He narrowly beat out Oakland Athletics infielder Eric Sogard.

Wright finished second in All-Star voting for third base to the Brewers' Aramis Ramírez, making it only the third time in 10 seasons he had been left out. Second baseman Daniel Murphy represented the Mets at the 2014 MLB All-Star Game.

Wright's 2014 performance declined from previous years. He hit at a .269 clip, his lowest batting average since his 2011 season was shortened due to injury. Wright's .269/.324/.374 slash line was attributed to a recurring shoulder injury. Early in the season, he sustained a left rotator cuff contusion, which slowed his offensive production and hurt his defense. Wright also finished the year playing in 134 games with 8 home runs, 63 RBI, and committed 15 errors, tied for the most on the team.

==== 2015 ====
On April 14, 2015, Wright suffered a strained right hamstring while stealing second base. He was placed on the 15-day disabled list. He was later diagnosed with spinal stenosis, and was expected to return towards the end of the season. Wright was placed on the 60-day DL for his injury on July 24, to clear up space on the 40-man roster. On August 10, the Mets sent Wright on a rehab assignment to the St. Lucie Mets.

Following Chase Utley's trade from the Philadelphia Phillies to the Los Angeles Dodgers in August, Wright became the longest-tenured active player to have played his entire career with one team. His 1,516 games with the Mets had previously only trailed Utley's 1,551 games with the Phillies.

Wright returned from his injury for the Mets' August 24 game in Philadelphia. In his first at-bat, he hit a home run off Phillies pitcher Adam Morgan, the first of a club record eight home runs the Mets would hit in a 16–7 victory. His return helped propel the Mets to the 2015 World Series against the Kansas City Royals. In his only World Series appearance, he committed an error in the 14th inning that led to the winning run as the Royals took a 5–4 victory in Game 1. In Game 3, he went 2-for-4 with 4 RBIs including his only World Series home run, off of Yordano Ventura as part of the Mets' 9–3 victory in their only win of the series. Wright played in only 38 games for the Mets in 2015, batting a slash line of .289/.379/.434 with a career-low 5 home runs and 17 RBI.

==== 2016 ====
As a result of his spinal stenosis, Wright had to complete an extensive pre-game workout routine consisting of physical therapy, exercise, and some minimal batting and fielding drills. The entire process took about 4–5 hours. On May 21, 2016, Wright hit a bases-loaded single off of Milwaukee Brewers pitcher Michael Blazek to break a tie in the bottom of the 9th inning and give the Mets a 5–4 victory. On June 3, Wright was placed on the disabled list due to a herniated disc in his neck. On June 16, he underwent neck surgery to repair the disc. Wright missed the remainder of the 2016 season, having played a career-low 37 games and batted .226/.350/.438 with 7 home runs and 14 RBI, the lowest batting average and RBI of his career.

==== 2017 ====
On February 28, 2017, after rehabbing from his neck surgery, Wright was diagnosed with a right shoulder impingement which, at the time, jeopardized his ability to play on Opening Day. He was, however, allowed to continue hitting as the injury only affected his ability to throw. This was yet another serious injury for Wright, which prompted people to ask General Manager Sandy Alderson if he thought that Wright would ever be able to play competitively again. He responded, "I don't think we're at that point, the point where that concern is at a more heightened level. This is all part of the process of rehabilitation from the neck surgery and it's taking longer than usual. I'm sure David would have hoped and we would hope – but it's all part of the process." On September 4, it was revealed that Wright would undergo rotator cuff surgery on his right shoulder, which prevented him from playing in the majors all year in 2017. He underwent surgery the following day.

==== 2018 ====
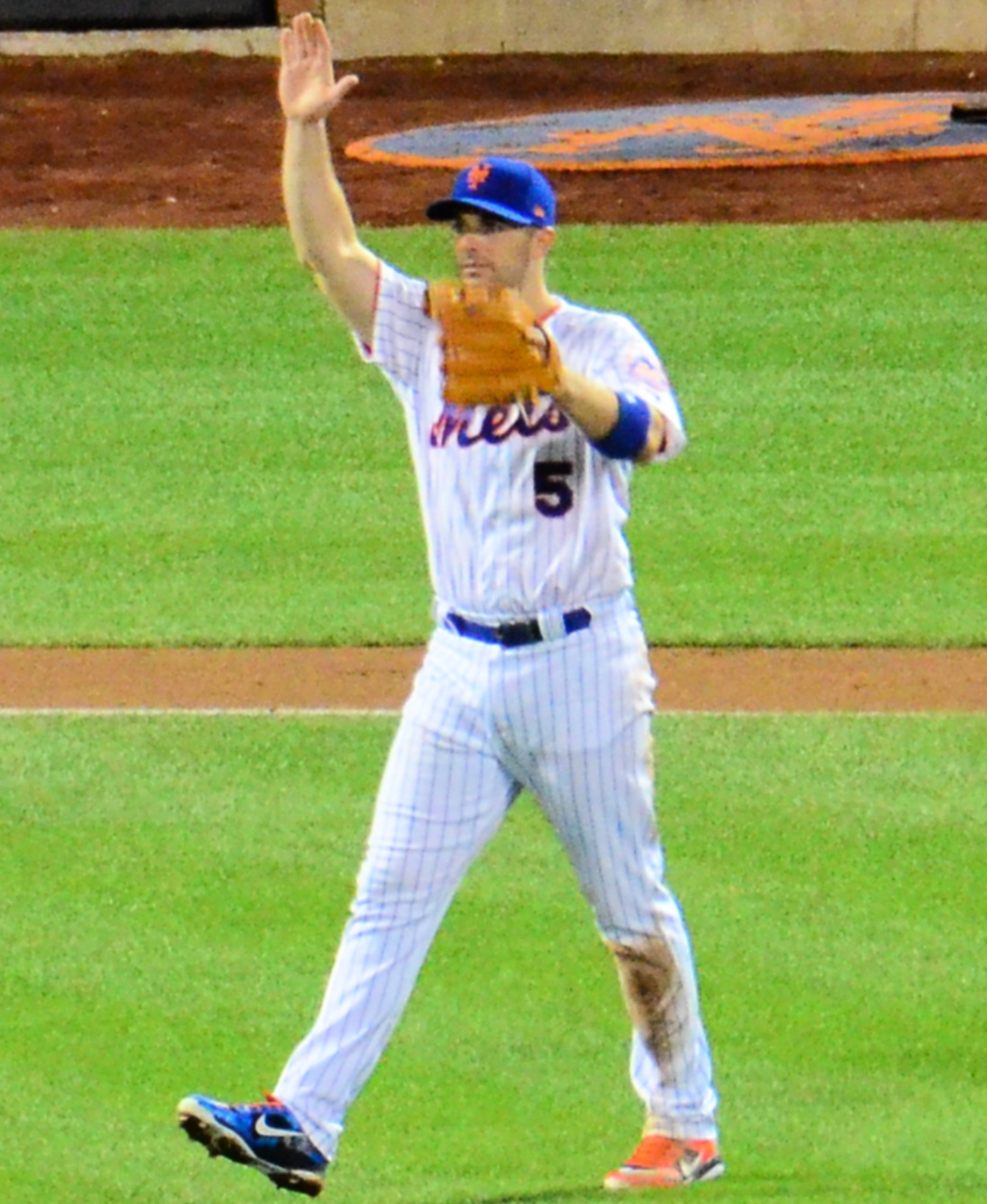
Wright acknowledging the crowd during his final professional game on September 29, 2018

On March 13, 2018, Wright experienced even more setbacks due to lingering back and shoulder injuries. At that point, he was shut down from baseball activities completely. On June 1, he was cleared to start baseball activities again. On June 25, he participated in batting practice at Citi Field. On August 12, Wright was slated to play five innings with the Single-A St. Lucie team in Clearwater. On August 28, Wright was promoted to AAA Las Vegas to continue his rehab, and singled in his first at bat.

On September 13, the Mets announced that Wright would be activated from the disabled list for the Mets' last homestand of the season and start the September 29 game against the Miami Marlins, his last appearance before retirement. On September 28, he grounded out as a pinch hitter against the Marlins, his first MLB appearance in over two years. On the following day, Wright batted 0-for-1 with a walk and fielded one ground ball before being removed in the fifth inning to a lengthy ovation by fans and players alike. The Mets went on to win the ballgame 1–0, with Austin Jackson hitting a walk-off double in the 13th inning. After the game, Wright addressed the Citi Field crowd, thanking them for supporting him throughout his career.

=== Career statistics ===
In 1585 games over 14 seasons, Wright posted a .296 batting average (1777-for-5998) with 949 runs scored, 390 doubles, 26 triples, 242 home runs, 970 runs batted in, 196 stolen bases, 762 walks, .376 on-base percentage, .491 slugging percentage, and .867 on-base plus slugging. Defensively, he recorded a .955 fielding percentage as a third baseman. In 24 postseason games, he hit only .198 (18-for-91) with 5 doubles, 2 home runs, 13 RBI, and 15 walks.

== World Baseball Classic ==
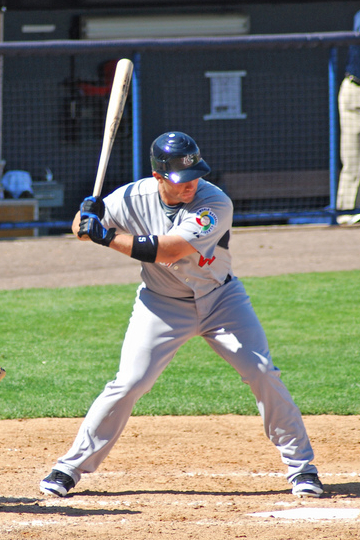
Wright batting for the U.S. national team in the 2009 World Baseball Classic

Wright was selected to play third base for the United States in the 2009 World Baseball Classic. In the second round, with the United States facing elimination against Puerto Rico, Wright delivered a 9th inning walk-off hit against Fernando Cabrera to win the game for the Americans 6-5. The win guaranteed Team USA a spot in the semifinal round against Japan.

He was again selected to play third base in the 2013 World Baseball Classic. In the 2013 WBC, Wright hit a 5th-inning grand slam in the United States' game against Italy to put the team ahead 6–2. It was the second time a United States player hit a grand slam in WBC play. In the second-round opener against Puerto Rico, Wright had 5 RBIs. Wright ended the tournament with the most total RBIs of any player and earned the nickname "Captain America". Wright sat out during the US loss to the Dominican Republic in the following game, citing soreness. He was later diagnosed with sore ribs and sent back to New York for further examination, ending his participation for the rest of the 2013 tournament. The US team went on to lose to Puerto Rico 4–3, resulting in an elimination. Wright was selected as the third baseman for the All-WBC team, the only American player to earn the honor.

== Mets franchise records ==
- New York Mets career All-Star Game appearances leader
- New York Mets career At-Bats (AB) leader (5,998 ABs)
- New York Mets career Bases on Balls (BB or Walk) leader (762 Walks)
- New York Mets career Doubles leader (390 Doubles)
- New York Mets career Extra Base Hits (EB) leader (658 EBs)
- New York Mets career Hits leader (1,777 Hits)
- New York Mets career Offensive WAR leader (Offensive War of 51.9)
- New York Mets career Plate Appearances (PA) leader (6,872 PAs)
- New York Mets career Runs Batted In (RBI) leader (970 RBIs)
- New York Mets career Runs Created leader (1,134 Runs Created)
- New York Mets career Runs Scored leader (949 Runs Scored)
- New York Mets career Sacrifice Flies leader (65 Sacrifice Flies)
- New York Mets career Strikeouts leader (1,292 Strikeouts)
- New York Mets career Times On Base (TOB) leader (2,584 TOBs)
- New York Mets career Total Bases leader (2,945 Total Bases)
- New York Mets career Baseball Reference Wins Above Replacement (bWAR) Position Players leader (bWAR of 49.2)

== Awards and honors ==
David Wright's number 5 was retired by the New York Mets in 2025.

The Mets retired Wright's number 5 on July 19, 2025.

MLB Award/Honor	# of times	Dates
Rookie of the Year - MLB.com Awards	1	2004
Play of the Year - MLB.com Awards	1	2005 (barehanded catch)
NL Player of the Week	3	(8/28/2005, 6/18/2006, 9/6/2011)
NL Player of the Month	2	(6/2006, 6/2010)
MLB Home Run Derby participant	2	2006 (runner up), 2013 (captain)
All-Star Selection	7	(2006, 2007, 2008, 2009, 2010, 2012, 2013)
Gold Glove Award Winner	2	(2007, 2008)
Silver Slugger Award Winner	2	(2007, 2008)
MLBPAA Mets Heart and Hustle Award	3	(2008, 2009, 2012)
Wilson Team Defensive Player of the Year	1	(2012)

Other Award/Honor	# of times	Dates
Sports Humanitarian of the Year	1	(2008)
30–30 club	1	(2007)
Ride of Fame	1	2013

== Personal life ==
Wright has maintained homes in Manhattan, Manhattan Beach, California, and Chesapeake, Virginia, where his boxer dog named Homer lives. His clubhouse nicknames include "Visine" and "Hollywood".

In May 2007, Vitamin Water was sold to The Coca-Cola Company for $4.1 billion. As part of his endorsement deal, Wright was given 0.5% of the company and thus netted approximately $20 million from the deal.

After dating model Molly Beers for several years, Wright announced in January 2013 that he and Beers were engaged to be married during the holidays. The couple were married in La Jolla, California, on December 26, 2013. They have two daughters and a son.

Wright's memoir, The Captain, was published on October 13, 2020, by Dutton-Penguin Books. It was co-written by Wright and Anthony DiComo, who is a Mets beat writer for MLB.com.

=== Charitable organizations ===
==== David Wright Foundation ====
In 2005, Wright began his own charitable organization, the David Wright Foundation. Its mission is to increase awareness about multiple sclerosis and to raise money for multiple sclerosis organizations and projects. The Foundation hosted its first annual gala at the New York Stock Exchange Members' Club on December 16, 2005, donating the proceeds to two multiple sclerosis centers.

During the 2009 season, Wright and New York Yankees shortstop Derek Jeter represented their foundations in a competition sponsored by Delta Air Lines. Jeter had the higher batting average and received $100,000 for his foundation from Delta while Wright's foundation received $50,000.

==== Big League Impact ====
Wright is the New York City host for Big League Impact, an eight-city fantasy football network created and led by longtime St. Louis Cardinals pitcher Adam Wainwright. In 2015, the organization raised more than $1 million in total for various charitable organizations.

== Media appearances ==
Delta Air Lines named an MD-88 airplane The Wright Flight, after Wright. The plane's name, along with Wright's signature and jersey number (5), are next to the boarding door. The plane shuttles between New York, Boston, and Washington. Wright is noted for his unaffected politeness and work ethic. He has been known to help participate with the Boys & Girls Clubs of America. He has developed a reputation for arriving very early to the park for games and being uncommonly accommodating with fans and reporters.

Wright was featured on the cover of MLB 07: The Show, as well as a TV commercial advertisement for the game on the PlayStation 3 game console. He has also appeared in a television commercial for Fathead, promoting the company's wall graphics.

In 2006, Wright appeared on MTV's Total Request Live with then-teammate Cliff Floyd. He also made an appearance on the Late Show with David Letterman on July 12, 2006. That same day he appeared on the cover of Sports Illustrated along with Mets teammates Carlos Beltrán, Paul Lo Duca, Carlos Delgado, and José Reyes.

On January 3, 2008, Wright appeared on The Celebrity Apprentice to purchase hot dogs for charity.

Wright is a celebrity spokesman for Ford in the New York/New Jersey market.

== See also ==
- 30–30 club
- List of Major League Baseball career home run leaders
- List of Major League Baseball players who spent their entire career with one franchise

Awards and achievements
Preceded by Jason Bay; Troy Glaus	National League Player of the Month; June 2006; June 2010	Succeeded by Chase Utley; Buster Posey
