= Harry Minor =

American baseball player and manager (1928–2017)

- Baseball player / Manager / Scout
- Born: March 7, 1928; Long Beach, California, U.S.
- Died: January 18, 2017 (aged 88); Long Beach, California, U.S.

Career highlights and awards
- 2× World Series champion team (1969; 1986)

Harry Mallory Minor (March 7, 1928 – January 18, 2017) was an American professional baseball player, manager and scout. Listed at 6' 2", 210 lb., he batted and threw right handed.

Born in Long Beach, California, Minor graduated from Wilson Classical High School where he excelled in both baseball and football. He then was signed by the Pittsburgh Pirates in 1946, starting a professional career that spanned 65 years. At first, he bounced around five organizations for over a decade in the Minor Leagues, through 1960, going from the Pirates to the Philadelphia Athletics, New York Yankees, Detroit Tigers and Milwaukee Braves.

A sturdy, savvy catcher, Minor also contributed as a pitcher, corner infielder and outfielder. He began scouting with the Braves in 1960 before moving to the New York Mets in 1967, for what turned on to be a 44-year relationship that included the 1986 World Series Championship and his becoming the first scout into the Mets Hall of Fame in 2013.

Minor began his career as a pitcher-outfielder for the Class A Riverside Dons of the Sunset League in 1947, where he posted a 6-10 record with a 6.29 ERA in 22 pitching appearances and also played 41 games at outfield. Overall, he hit a solid slash line of .299/.370/.462 with seven home runs and 47 runs batted in. In 1948 Minor gained promotion to the Waco Pirates in the Class B Big State League. While there, he hit a .273 average and slugged .429 through 100 games, including 27 doubles, two triples and nine homers.

His most productive season came in 1949 with Class C Keokuk Pirates, when he topped the Central Association with a .350 average and finished second both in home runs (24) and slugging (.579). Unfortunately, Minor never was able to rise above Triple A level in any of his minor league seasons, and those moments came only in the International League with the Buffalo Bisons, in 1950, and for the Ottawa Athletics in 1953 and 1954. In between, he was called into active military service during Korean War.

Afterwards, Minor enjoyed three seasons of double duty from 1958 through 1960 as a player-manager for the Class D Wellsville Braves in the New York–Penn League, where he had an overall managing record of 299-222 (.574) for those seasons. The Braves benefited from his guidance in 1958, when they went 70-56 and clinched the pennant but lost in the championship series. The next year, Minor guided Wellsville to an 80-46 record and won the pennant as well as the championship. He then did it again in 1960, going 69-60 for a second place before winning the NYPL championship for a second year in a row.

In this three-year stint, Minor also helped himself with the bat while hitting .289 with 17 HR and 88 RBI in 1958; .318, 13 HR, 64 RBI in 1959, and .318, 13 HR, 64 RBI in 1960. Additionally, he showed an advanced plate approach with more walks (248) than strikeouts (118), striking out in just 10.59 percent of his plate appearances (1,114), posting a collective on-base percentage of .455 and making sure his final seasons ended on a solid note. Over a 12-season minor league career, he hit .283 with 124 homers and slugged .450 while appearing in 1,112 games.

The Braves made Minor a scout in 1960, and he moved to the Mets in 1967, to ensure a successful long-term relationship under nine different general managers and stayed there in various areas of player evaluation until his retirement in 2013. He served as the national cross checker during his tenure with the organization and was an integral part of the 1969 and 1986 teams that won World Series titles.

Minor earned that respect with a scouting sense that led to him being involved in the signing of numerous amateur players for the organization, including Dwight Gooden, Darryl Strawberry, Lenny Dykstra, Mookie Wilson, Wally Backman, Kevin Mitchell and Kevin Elster, all of them members of the 1986 World Series champion Mets, as well as Hubie Brooks, John Gibbons, Greg Jefferies and Tim Leary.

Besides, in 1969 Minor filled a need for the organization and returned to managing for their Visalia Mets club when its manager Roy McMillan was promoted to Double-A team Memphis Blues. Minor assumed control of the Visalia team during the final half of its season and finished 80-60, placing second in the Class A California League and losing in the league finals to the Stockton Ports.

In 1996, Minor earned the MLB Scout of the Year Award, and in 2007, he was recognized by the Professional Baseball Scouts Foundation with their George Genovese Lifetime Achievement Award. In addition, Minor is a member of every Hall of Fame he was eligible for, having been inducted in the Long Beach Wilson, Long Beach Century Club and Long Beach Baseball Halls of Fame. Finally, to broaden the scope and footprint of these awards, he achieved the aforementioned induction into the New York Mets in 2013.

Minor died in January 2017 in Long Beach, California, at the age of 88. He was married with Elizabeth Gale, his wife of 65 years, and they had four children: two girls, Debbie and Becky, and two boys, Bob and Steven, who played school baseball and then became scouts like their father.
