= List of Arizona Diamondbacks owners and executives =

The Arizona Diamondbacks have had two owners and five general managers in their 20-year history. As of November 2023, these executives have compiled a 1222–1208 (.503) record, five National League West Division titles (1999, 2000, 2001, 2007, 2011), two National League pennants (2001, 2023), and one World Series title (2001).

== Owners ==
The term "owner" in this section refers to the official title of managing general partner. Actual economic ownership includes the individuals listed, but excludes other owners holding major and minor portions of the team.

Owner: Ken Kendrick

== General managers ==
| Name | Years |
|---|---|
| Joe Garagiola, Jr. | 1997–2005 |
| Bob Gebhard (interim) | 2005 |
| Josh Byrnes | 2005–2010 |
| Jerry Dipoto (interim) | 2010 |
| Kevin Towers | 2010–2014 |
| Dave Stewart | 2014–2016 |
| Mike Hazen | 2017–present |

== Presidents ==
| Name | Years |
|---|---|
| Rich Dozer | 1998–2005 |
| Derrick Hall | 2005–present |

== Other executives ==
- Dave Duncan
- Jim Marshall
- Roland Hemond
