= Gord Ash =

Canadian baseball executive

Milwaukee Brewers
- Vice President of Baseball Projects
- Born: December 20, 1951 (age 73); Toronto, Ontario, Canada

Member of the Canadian

Baseball Hall of Fame
- Induction: 2019

Gordon Ian Ash (born December 20, 1951) is a Canadian baseball executive who has been vice president of baseball projects of the Milwaukee Brewers since 2015. He was previously general manager of the Toronto Blue Jays from 1995 to 2001, and assistant general manager with Milwaukee from 2003 to 2015.

Ash received a Bachelor of Arts degree from York University in 1974. After graduating, he started at the Canadian Imperial Bank of Commerce working in a branch. In 1978, he joined the Toronto Blue Jays Baseball Club in the ticket department. He quickly became operations supervisor in 1979, assistant director of stadium operations in 1980, administrator of player personnel in 1984, and assistant general manager in 1989.

From 1995 to 2001, he was the general manager. During his time the Blue Jays made many noteworthy draft picks, such as Roy Halladay, Craig Wilson, and Ryan Freel in 1995, Billy Koch in 1996, Vernon Wells, Michael Young, and Orlando Hudson in 1997, Felipe López in 1998, and Alex Ríos in 1999. A number of these prospects, most notably Michael Young, ended up being traded away before they fully developed. During his tenure, Toronto finished no better than 3rd in the AL East division, with a record of 541–575 over that span. After being replaced by J. P. Ricciardi, in 2001, he became a baseball analyst for TSN before he was appointed assistant general manager of the Milwaukee Brewers in 2003. David Stearns, who was hired as the Brewers' general manager after the 2015 season, reassigned Ash within the organization.

With Brewers owner Mark Attanasio and pitcher Ben Sheets, Ash is an investor in the Milwaukee Admirals minor league hockey team.

Sporting positions
Preceded by Pat Gillick	Toronto Blue Jays General Manager; 1995–2001	Succeeded by J. P. Ricciardi
