= John Ricco =

American baseball executive

John Ricco (born April 14, 1968) is an American baseball executive. He is the senior vice president and Chief of Staff for the New York Mets of Major League Baseball (MLB). He previously served as the Mets' interim general manager.

== Biography ==
Ricco grew up in Cresskill, New Jersey, as a fan of the New York Yankees. Ricco graduated from Cresskill High School and Villanova University. Ricco joined the organization as the assistant general manager in April 2004 after spending twelve years working for the commissioner's office at Major League Baseball. A graduate of Cresskill (N.J.) High School and Villanova, Ricco wrote for the university's student newspaper. John has a wife and 3 children.

Ricco worked in the office of the Commissioner of Major League Baseball, before joining the Mets in 2004. He became assistant general manager in 2006. When the Mets fired Omar Minaya as general manager in 2010, they named Ricco interim general manager. He served in the role from October 4 until October 29, when the Mets hired Sandy Alderson. When Alderson went on a medical leave of absence in July 2018, Ricco, Minaya, and J. P. Ricciardi assumed the duties of general manager. After the Mets hired Brodie Van Wagenen as their general manager during the offseason, they named Ricco senior vice president and senior strategy officer.
