= J. P. Ricciardi =

American baseball executive (born 1959)

J.P. Ricciardi
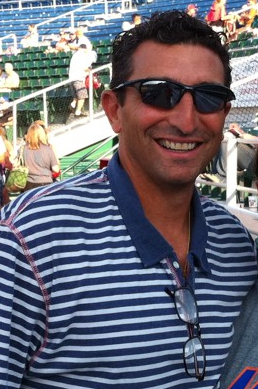
- Ricciardi in 2011
- General manager
- Born: September 26, 1959 (age 66); Worcester, Massachusetts, U.S.

Teams
- Oakland Athletics (1996–2001); Toronto Blue Jays (2001–2009); New York Mets (2010–2018); San Francisco Giants (2018–2023)

John Paul Ricciardi (born September 26, 1959) is an American former Major League Baseball executive currently serving as an analyst for the Boston Red Sox and Worcester Red Sox on NESN. He served as the general manager of the Toronto Blue Jays from 2001 to 2009, and as the as a special advisor to the president of baseball operations with the San Francisco Giants from 2018 to 2023.

== Early life ==
Ricciardi went to and played baseball for St. Peter's/St. Peter-Marian High School in Worcester, Massachusetts, and then played for the Saint Leo University Lions from 1979 through 1980. He then spent two years as an infielder in the New York Mets minor league system, playing for the Mets' A-class league affiliates in Little Falls in 1980 and Shelby in 1981. He finished his playing career with a batting average below .200.

== Executive career ==
=== Early career ===
After the conclusion of his playing career, Ricciardi became a coach in the New York Yankees farm system in the early 1980s before joining the Oakland Athletics organization in 1986 as a minor league instructor and scout. By the early 1990s he had risen to the rank of East Coast scouting supervisor and later national crosschecker. Ricciardi made his break into the front office in 1996, when he became special assistant to Athletics general manager Sandy Alderson. Under new general manager Billy Beane, who was hired in 1997 and had been Ricciardi's former teammate with the Little Falls Mets, his role became director of player personnel. Ricciardi claims credit for hiring Paul DePodesta, who was a significant part of Moneyball.

Impressed by the success Ricciardi and Beane were having with the low-budget Athletics, the Toronto Blue Jays, who sought to cut payroll while becoming more competitive after their acquisition by Canadian media giant Rogers Communications, sought Ricciardi's services after firing then-general manager Gord Ash. During his tenure, the Blue Jays never made the playoffs, coming closest in 2006, when they finished second in their division.

=== Toronto Blue Jays ===
==== 2001-2004 ====
On November 14, 2001, Ricciardi was hired as general manager of the Blue Jays. He signed a five-year contract with Toronto after the 2002 season, which was extended to 2010 after the 2005 season.

After arriving in Toronto, one of Ricciardi's first deals was to send hard-throwing reliever Billy Koch to the Athletics for third baseman Eric Hinske and pitcher Justin Miller. Over the next few years, Ricciardi would develop a reputation for coziness with his former team, making deals with Oakland for starting pitcher Cory Lidle in November 2002 and another starting pitcher, Ted Lilly, in November 2003. After a surprising 2003 campaign, which saw the emergence of Roy Halladay and Vernon Wells, the team suffered its worst season since 1980, in 2004, mainly due to injuries to key players such as Wells and star slugger Carlos Delgado. Delgado became a free agent in the off-season, and for financial reasons the Blue Jays did not seriously pursue re-signing him; the Florida Marlins eventually inked him to a contract. During the 2004 season, Ricciardi hired former Shelby teammate John Gibbons as the Blue Jays' new manager. Gibbons remained as Blue Jays' manager until being fired on June 20, 2008.

Ricciardi's arrival in Toronto had been greeted with great optimism and enthusiasm after the team had suffered through several disappointing seasons. The enthusiasm steadily waned, however, as the team repeatedly failed to qualify for the postseason.

==== 2005 ====
Ricciardi was given more freedom to move after Blue Jays owner Ted Rogers expanded the team's payroll to $210 million over three years prior to the 2005 season. In the 2005 MLB draft, Ricciardi famously drafted Ricky Romero instead of Troy Tulowitzki, overruling the recommendations of his scouting staff. While Romero would have modest success, even being named to the 2011 MLB All-Star Game as a Blue Jay before eventually being released by the team, Tulowitzki would have the better career, winning multiple awards with the Colorado Rockies. Coincidentally, Tulowitzki would join the Blue Jays 10 years later in a trade executed by Riccardi's successor, Alex Anthopoulos.

==== 2006 ====
After the 2005 season (in which the Blue Jays posted an 80–82 record), Ricciardi began working to improve Toronto's pitching, signing free agent starter A. J. Burnett and closer B.J. Ryan. He also secured two big bats in first baseman Lyle Overbay and slugging third baseman Troy Glaus via the trading block, and signed Gold Glove-winning catcher Bengie Molina as well. The additions paid significant dividends for the team in 2006, as the Blue Jays finished second in the tough American League East with an 87–75 record. It was the first time Toronto had finished above third in the division since winning the 1993 World Series.

==== 2007 ====
Seeking to upgrade the everyday lineup as well, Ricciardi signed a two-year contract with experienced slugger and designated hitter Frank Thomas. However, due to his slow start in 2008, in which he batted just .167 with three home runs in his first 60 at-bats, Thomas was released in April of that year. Ricciardi also signed veteran shortstop Royce Clayton as a "stopgap" measure to shore up the middle infield for the 2007 season.

During spring training of 2007, B.J. Ryan was suffering from an injury that Ricciardi initially reported to be a result of a bad back. It was later revealed that it was not a back injury that he was suffering from at all, but rather a more severe elbow injury which subsequently required season ending Tommy John surgery. When asked why he was not more upfront about Ryan's injury situation, Ricciardi responded by saying, "They're not lies if we know the truth."

==== 2008 ====
Despite the lack of hitting on his 2008 ball club, Ricciardi had assembled one of the more effective pitching staffs in Major League Baseball, bolstered by bullpen pick-ups such as Scott Downs, Brian Tallet, Jesse Carlson, and Shawn Camp. Over the season, the team had the best ERA in baseball at 3.49 and the bullpen ERA of 2.94. Early in the season, the Jays struggled, and the team fired manager John Gibbons, replacing him with former manager Cito Gaston. Toronto ended the season on a high note, finishing with a final record of 86 wins and 76 losses, the organization's third-best showing since the 1993 season.

In the middle of June 2008, with the Jays in last place in the American League East, Ricciardi appeared on local Toronto sports radio station The FAN 590, in which he fielded questions from fans. One fan insisted that the Jays should actively seek to acquire Cincinnati Reds outfielder Adam Dunn, to which Ricciardi responded with very negative personal comments about Dunn's passion for the game of baseball:

Do you know the guy doesn't really like baseball that much? Do you know the guy doesn't have a passion to play the game that much? How much do you know about the player? There's a reason why you're attracted to some players and there's a reason why you're not attracted to some players. I don't think you'd be very happy if we brought Adam Dunn here ... We've done our homework on guys like Adam Dunn and there's a reason why we don't want Adam Dunn. I don't want to get into specifics.

On June 24, 2008, Ricciardi told Toronto media that he received a personal phone call from Dunn and personally apologized for the ad-lib comments, a conversation Dunn vehemently refuted in an interview with MLB.com. Some again questioned Ricciardi's trustworthiness, but Ricciardi said, "All I know is the person I talked to said it was Adam Dunn. That's quite a prank to pull."

==== 2009 ====
During Roy Halladay's last home start of the 2009 season on September 25, a sign in the 500 level stating "Fire JP!" was hung over the railing. The sign was taken away by security at the bottom of the 2nd inning.

With two games remaining in what was a disappointing 2009 season, Ricciardi was fired on October 3, 2009. The day before Blue Jays players had gone public with criticism over Gaston's managing style, and had asked for a meeting with team president Paul Beeston. His firing was widely expected. Ricciardi was replaced by assistant vice-president of baseball operations and assistant general manager, Alex Anthopoulos. Anthopoulos was eventually made the permanent general manager for the Jays.

=== New York Mets ===
Ricciardi joined the Mets front office in November 2010.

From 2011 to 2018 Ricciardi served as special assistant to former New York Mets General Manager Sandy Alderson. In July 2018 Alderson took a leave of absence from the Mets due to a recurrence of cancer. Ricciardi along with John Ricco and Omar Minaya assumed the responsibilities of general manager. Ricciardi and the Mets mutually parted ways after the 2018 season.

=== San Francisco Giants ===
In December 2018, Ricciardi was hired by the San Francisco Giants as a senior adviser of baseball operations. In 2023, Ricciardi announced his retirement from being an executive.

== Television career ==
On February 25, 2010, ESPN announced that Ricciardi would join Baseball Tonight as an analyst after spending three decades in Major League Baseball. Ricciardi left ESPN to join the Mets front office in November 2010.

In 2024, Ricciardi joined NESN as a broadcaster for the Triple-A affiliate of the Boston Red Sox, the Worcester Red Sox, calling select games. In 2026, he became a studio analyst for NESN, appearing on pregame and postgame coverage for select Boston Red Sox games.

== Personal life ==
Ricciardi is married and lives with his family in West Boylston, Massachusetts. He and his wife Diane have two sons, Dante and Mariano, both of whom would play for their hometown Worcester Bravehearts. He also has a brother, Stephan Ricciardi, and sister, Mary Sivo. Ricciardi's father, John, was an athlete.

Ricciardi's son Dante was drafted by the Seattle Mariners in the 39th round of the 2015 MLB June Amateur Draft from Worcester Academy, while his son Mariano was taken by the Oakland Athletics in the 18th round of the 2021 MLB June Amateur Draft out of the University of Dayton.

Ricciardi is also a fan of the Boston Bruins, New England Patriots and Boston Celtics.

== Executive career ==
Season	Team	League	Position	W	L	GB	Finish
2002	Toronto Blue Jays	AL	General manager	78	84	25.5	3rd
2003	Toronto Blue Jays	AL	General manager	86	76	15.0	3rd
2004	Toronto Blue Jays	AL	General manager	67	94	33.5	5th
2005	Toronto Blue Jays	AL	General manager	80	82	15.0	3rd
2006	Toronto Blue Jays	AL	General manager	87	75	10.0	2nd
2007	Toronto Blue Jays	AL	General manager	83	79	13.0	3rd
2008	Toronto Blue Jays	AL	General manager	86	76	11.0	4th
2009	Toronto Blue Jays	AL	General manager	75	87	28.0	4th

Preceded by Gord Ash	Toronto Blue Jays general manager 2001–2009	Succeeded by Alex Anthopoulos
