= Sandy Alderson =

American baseball executive (born 1947)

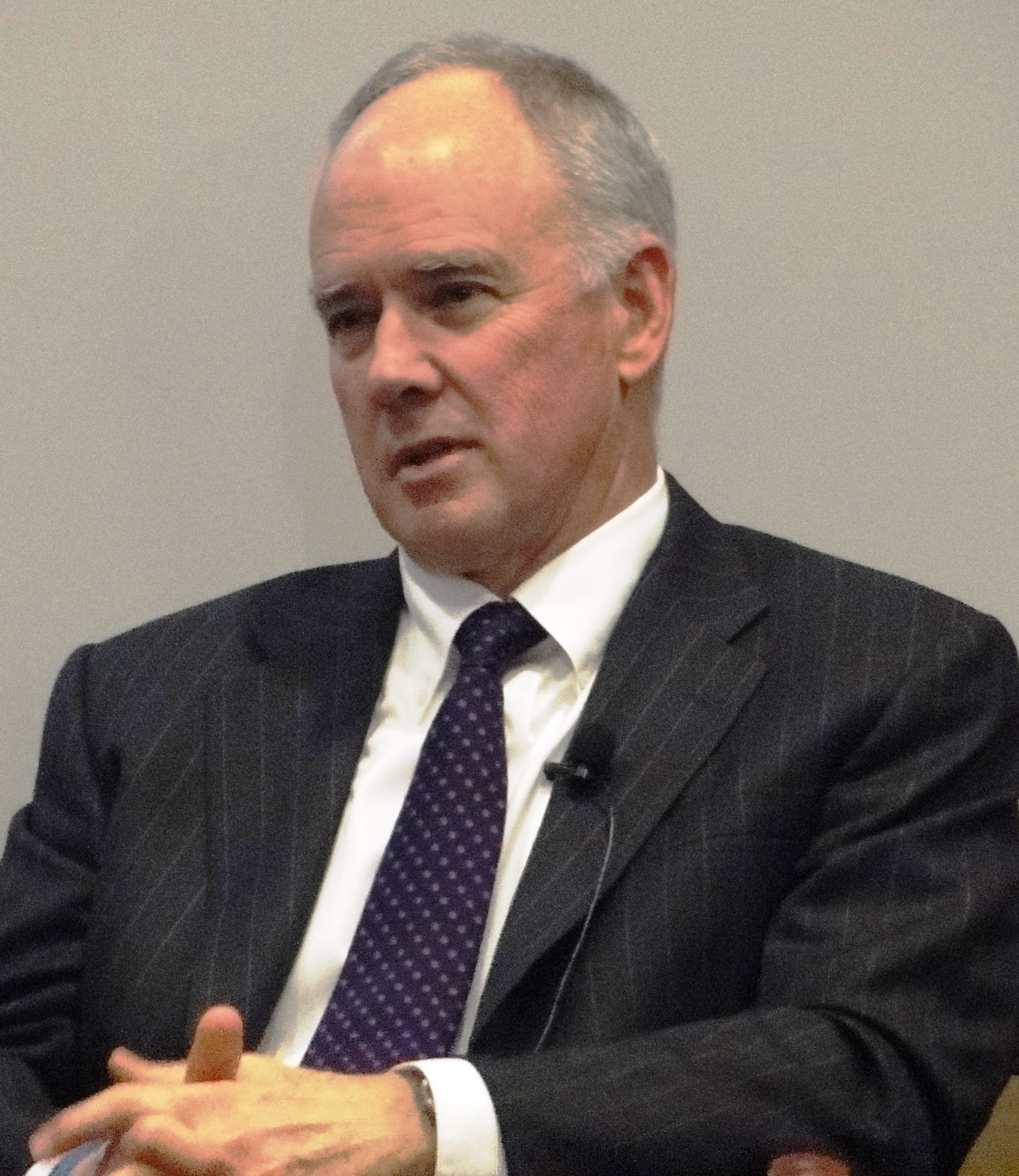
- Alderson in 2010
- Born: November 22, 1947 (age 78); Seattle, Washington, U.S.

Teams
- As general manager: Oakland Athletics (1983–1997); New York Mets (2011–2018); As CEO: San Diego Padres (2005–2009); As president: New York Mets (2021–2023)

Career highlights and awards
- World Series champion (1989); Baseball America Executive of the Year (2015); Athletics Hall of Fame

Richard Lynn "Sandy" Alderson (born November 22, 1947) is an American baseball executive. He was the president of various Major League Baseball teams, including the New York Mets. He was the general manager of the New York Mets from 2011 to 2018, an executive in the Oakland Athletics and San Diego Padres organizations, and the commissioner's office of Major League Baseball. As a front office executive, Alderson led the Athletics to a World Series championship in 1989 and led the Athletics to the World Series in three straight seasons. Alderson led the Mets to the 2015 World Series.

== Early life ==
Alderson is the son of Gwenny Parry Alderson and John Lester Alderson; the latter an Air Force pilot who flew missions during World War II, Korea, and Vietnam. Alderson has two siblings, Kristy and Dave.

Alderson attended Falls Church High School in Falls Church, Virginia and later Dartmouth College in New Hampshire on a NROTC scholarship. After graduating from Dartmouth in 1969, he joined the United States Marine Corps and served a tour of duty in Vietnam. He received his Juris Doctor from Harvard Law School in 1976. After law school, he worked for the Farella Braun & Martel law firm in San Francisco, California.

== Career ==
=== Oakland Athletics ===
Roy Eisenhardt, one of the firm's partners, left to become president of the Oakland Athletics when his father-in-law, Walter A. Haas Jr., bought the team. In 1981, Alderson joined Eisenhardt to become the Athletics' general counsel and in 1983 was named the team's general manager, a position he held through 1997. Under Alderson, the Athletics' minor league system was rebuilt, which bore fruit later that decade as José Canseco (1986), Mark McGwire (1987), and Walt Weiss (1988) were chosen as American League Rookies of the Year. The Athletics won four division titles, three pennants and the 1989 World Series during Alderson's tenure.

In 1995, Haas died and the team's new owners, Stephen Schott and Ken Hofmann, ordered Alderson to slash payroll. As a result, Alderson began focusing on sabermetric principles toward obtaining relatively undervalued players. He was a mentor to his eventual successor as general manager, Billy Beane.

=== Commissioner's office ===
Alderson left the Athletics to work for Major League Baseball's commissioner’s office, where he was the Executive Vice President for Baseball Operations between September 1998 and 2005. In 2010, Alderson worked as commissioner Bud Selig’s point man to address the issues of the corruption of baseball in the Dominican Republic, the largest supplier of Major League Baseball talent outside the United States.

=== San Diego Padres ===
Alderson was chief executive officer for the San Diego Padres from 2005 to 2009, with the team winning back-to-back division titles in 2005 and 2006. Concurrently, he lectured at the University of California, Berkeley Haas School of Business.

=== New York Mets ===
Alderson was hired by the New York Mets after the 2010 baseball season to replace Omar Minaya as the general manager. He was officially introduced on October 29, 2010, signing a four-year deal with a club option for 2015. Mets owner, Fred Wilpon, was dealing with his involvement in the Madoff investment scandal, and Alderson worked with a limited budget. As Alderson was Billy Beane's predecessor and mentor with the Oakland A's, and as the Mets also hired Beane's former associates Paul DePodesta and J. P. Ricciardi to the front office, the team was jokingly referred to as the "Moneyball Mets".

The first big money signing that Alderson did with the Mets was a 7-year contract extension for David Wright in December 2012 which was worth $138 million (7 years for $122 million plus a club option for $16 million that the club picked up for the 2013 season). Wright's deal was contrary to the Mets budget-conscious policy of not offering large contracts to players aged in their 30s. Nonetheless, Alderson made an exception as he viewed Wright as a leader and role model, on and off the field. Although it had been six years since the Mets' last playoff appearance and four years since their last winning season, Alderson managed to persuade Wright to stay, as the Mets' farm system had many young, talented pitchers.

From 2012 to 2014, Alderson reduced the Mets payroll to under $100 million, and exchanged veterans to acquire young talent such as Zack Wheeler, Noah Syndergaard, and Travis d'Arnaud. Alderson also developed players drafted by Minaya such as Matt Harvey, Jacob deGrom, and Steven Matz. The Mets won the National League Pennant in 2015, earning their first World Series appearance since 2000.

Alderson took a leave of absence from the Mets in July 2018 due to a recurrence of cancer. He was informally succeeded on an interim basis by John Ricco, Omar Minaya, and J. P. Ricciardi. After the season he later decided not to return to the position. Since then, he has been cancer-free.

=== Return to the Athletics ===
In January 2019, Alderson returned to the Oakland Athletics as senior advisor of baseball operations to general manager Billy Beane. He left the position after the 2020 season in order to return to the Mets front office.

=== Return to the Mets ===
In September 2020, new Mets owner Steve Cohen hired Alderson as team president after he was approved as majority owner by MLB. He replaced Saul Katz, who had had the role since 1980. In September 2022, it was announced he would step down as team president and move into a special advisory role. In February 2023, Alderson was officially no longer president.

=== Record as general manager ===
Team	Year	Regular season					Postseason			
Team	Year	Games	Won	Lost	Win %	Finish	Won	Lost	Win %	Result
OAK	1983	162	74	88	.457	4th in AL West	–	–	–	–
OAK	1984	162	77	85	.475	4th in AL West	–	–	–	–
OAK	1985	162	77	85	.475	5th in AL West	–	–	–	–
OAK	1986	162	76	86	.469	3rd in AL West	–	–	–	–
OAK	1987	162	81	81	.500	3rd in AL West	–	–	–	–
OAK	1988	162	104	58	.642	1st in AL West	5	4	.556	Lost World Series (LAD)
OAK	1989	162	99	63	.611	1st in AL West	8	1	.889	Won World Series (SF)
OAK	1990	162	103	59	.636	1st in AL West	4	4	.500	Lost World Series (CIN)
OAK	1991	162	84	78	.519	4th in AL West	–	–	–	–
OAK	1992	162	96	66	.593	1st in AL West	2	4	.333	Lost ALCS (TOR)
OAK	1993	162	68	94	.420	7th in AL West	–	–	–	–
OAK	1994	114	51	63	.447	2nd in AL West	–	–	–	–
OAK	1995	144	67	77	.465	4th in AL West	–	–	–	–
OAK	1996	162	78	84	.481	3rd in AL West	–	–	–	–
OAK	1997	162	65	97	.401	4th in AL West	–	–	–	–
OAK total		2,364	1,200	1,164	.508		19	13	.594	
NYM	2011	162	77	85	.475	4th in NL East	–	–	–	–
NYM	2012	162	74	88	.457	4th in NL East	–	–	–	–
NYM	2013	162	74	88	.457	3rd in NL East	–	–	–	–
NYM	2014	162	79	83	.488	3rd in NL East	–	–	–	–
NYM	2015	162	90	72	.556	1st in NL East	8	6	.571	Lost World Series (KC)
NYM	2016	162	87	75	.537	2nd in NL East	0	1	.000	Lost NLWC (SF)
NYM	2017	162	70	92	.432	4th in NL East	–	–	–	–
NYM	2018	162	77	85	.475	4th in NL East	–	–	–	–
NYM total		1,296	628	668	.485		8	7	.533	
Total		3,660	1,828	1,832	.499		27	20	.574	

== Personal life ==
Alderson is married to Linda Alderson. They have two children, Bryn and Cate, who both also attended Dartmouth, and 5 grandchildren. Alderson lives in St. Petersburg, Florida.

Sporting positions
Preceded by Billy Martin	Oakland Athletics General Manager; 1983–1997	Succeeded by Billy Beane
Preceded by Walter Haas Jr.	Oakland Athletics President; 1993–1995	Succeeded by Steve Schott
Preceded by Steve Schott	Oakland Athletics President; 1996–1998	Succeeded by Michael Crowley
Preceded by None	Major League Baseball; Executive Vice President for Baseball Operations; 1998–2005	Succeeded by Jimmie Lee Solomon
Preceded by Dick Freeman	San Diego Padres CEO; 2005–2009	Succeeded by Jeff Moorad
Preceded by Omar Minaya	New York Mets General Manager; 2010–2018	Succeeded by Brodie Van Wagenen
Preceded by Saul Katz	New York Mets President; 2020–2023	Succeeded by Vacant
