= Omar Minaya =

Dominican baseball executive (born 1958)

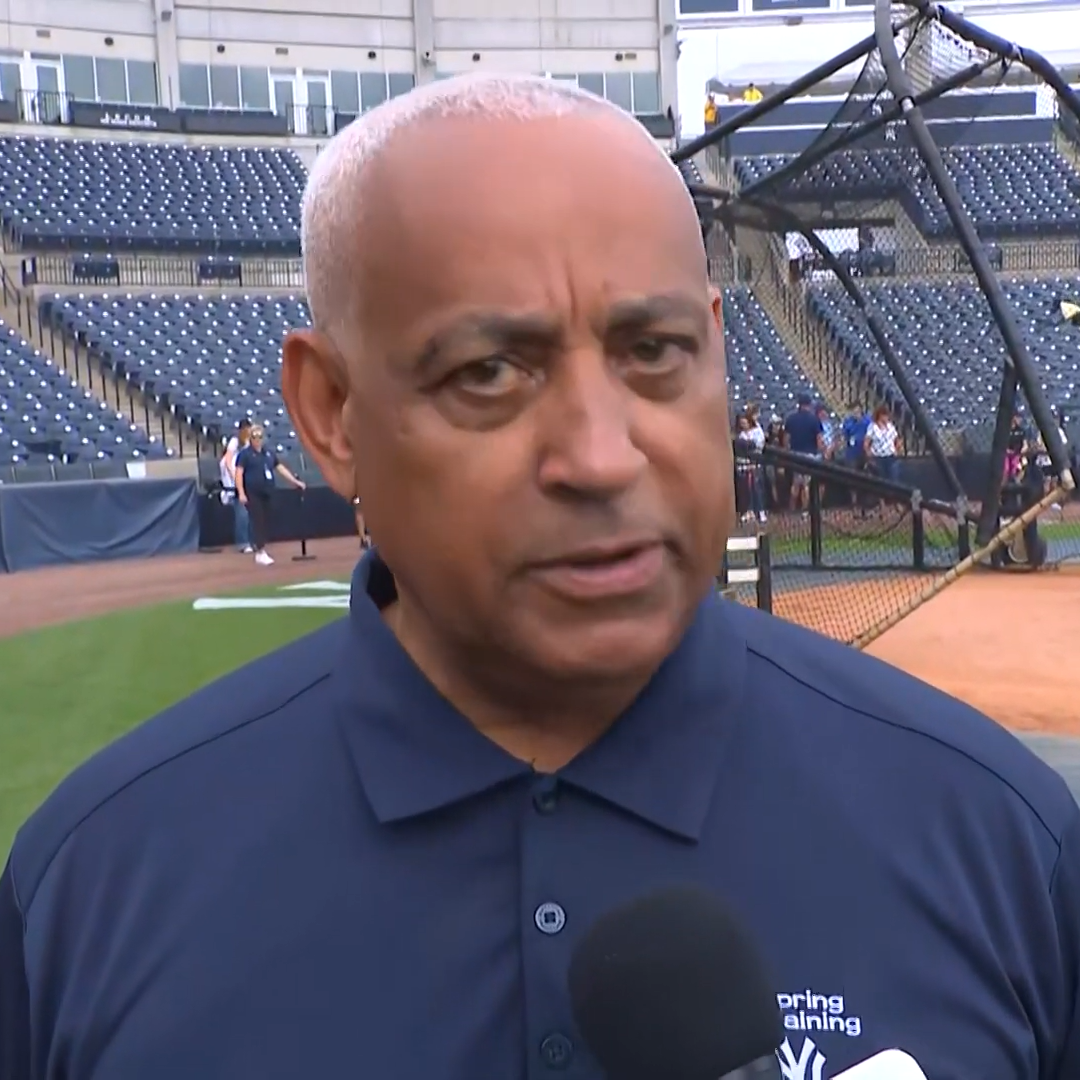
- Minaya with the Yankees in 2025
- Born: November 10, 1958 (age 68); Dominican Republic
- Bats: Right Throws: Right
- Stats at Baseball Reference

Omar Teodoro Antonio Minaya y Sánchez (born November 10, 1958) is a Dominican baseball executive who served as general manager for the New York Mets and the Montreal Expos.

== Early life ==
Minaya was born in the Dominican Republic to Lolo Minaya and Antonia Sanchez. His mother named him for Omar Khayyam, the Persian poet. His father served two years in prison for anti-government activities. His father moved to Queens, New York City, and in 1967, when Minaya was eight years old, the rest of the family joined Lolo in Corona. He has two sisters, Adelina and Sixta. He starred as a baseball player at Newtown High School in Elmhurst.

== Playing career ==
Minaya turned down a scholarship from Mississippi State and was drafted by the Oakland Athletics in the 14th Round (342nd overall) of the 1978 Major League Baseball draft. He took half of his $13,500 signing bonus and gave it to his parents so they could move back to the Dominican Republic.

He had a short-lived career in the minor leagues as well as stints in leagues in both the Dominican Republic and Italy.

== Front-office career ==
After injuries ended his playing career, Minaya joined the Texas Rangers' scouting team in 1985, where he helped in the signing of players such as Sammy Sosa, Juan González, and Ivan Rodriguez.

=== New York Mets ===
In the mid-1990s, Minaya left Texas and returned home to join the staff of the New York Mets, working his way to assistant general manager behind Steve Phillips and being partly responsible for that team's late-1990s success. Minaya became the first Hispanic to hold a general manager position in Major League Baseball when he left the Mets in early 2002 to accept the general manager position with the Montreal Expos.

=== Montreal Expos ===
In 2002, Minaya was named vice president and general manager of the Montreal Expos, which had been taken over by Major League Baseball. This unusual ownership arrangement was reached after an attempt at contracting the Expos failed, while MLB set up a three-way deal in which John W. Henry, the owner of the Florida Marlins, was allowed to purchase the Boston Red Sox, while the Expos' owner, Jeffrey Loria, was permitted to sell the Montreal club and purchase the Florida Marlins instead. When Minaya arrived, there were only six other employees in baseball operations; those who hadn't followed Loria to Miami had gone elsewhere.

With the fan base rapidly declining and speculation that the team would be relocated, Minaya was forced to work with limited financial resources. Despite these limitations, Minaya was aggressive in his attempt to make the Expos a contender, in a wild attempt to salvage the franchise's future in Montreal. On June 27, 2002, he traded Cliff Lee (future Cy Young winner and 2-time All-Star), Grady Sizemore (future 3-time All-Star, 2-time Gold Glove winner, and Silver Slugger), Brandon Phillips (future All-Star and two time Gold Glove winner) and Lee Stevens to the Cleveland Indians for Bartolo Colón. On July 11, he acquired Cliff Floyd from the Marlins only to deal him to the Boston Red Sox for Sun-Woo Kim and a minor leaguer by the end of the month. The 2002 Expos ended up with an 83–79 record and second place in the National League East.

The 2003 Expos finished with an identical 83–79 record and were very much in the wild card race when Minaya was denied permission to make the usual call-ups that MLB teams make in September; MLB said it couldn't pay the (rather minimal) increase in salary that such promotions entail. This, combined with the departure of star Vladimir Guerrero after the season, cost the Expos what little goodwill they still had in Montreal. The Expos went 67–95 in 2004 amid reports that their future in Montreal would soon end. When it was announced the Expos would relocate to Washington, D.C. for the 2005 season, Minaya learned with the move would come a whole new front office and coaching positions.

The half-season rental of Bartolo Colón made by Minaya made as general manager of the Expos is part of arguably one of the most one-sided trades of the century, as it included the 2008 AL Cy Young Award winner in Lee and future All-Stars Brandon Phillips and Grady Sizemore. Minaya also dealt away a number of other young players, all of whom went on to enjoy success upon reaching the major league level. These included:

- Jason Bay (2004 Rookie of the Year, All-Star in 2005, 2006, & 2009, Top 25 in MVP Voting 2005 & 2006)
- Carl Pavano (2004 All-Star and Cy Young Award candidate)
- Chris Young (2007 All-Star)

=== New York Mets (second stint) ===
After the Mets continued to struggle at the conclusion of the 2004 season, Mets owner Fred Wilpon asked Minaya to become the team's general manager. In Minaya's first offseason he made two significant free agent signings, adding pitcher Pedro Martínez and outfielder Carlos Beltrán. Signing Martinez helped raise the awareness of the Mets in Latin America, leading Minaya to remark that Martinez was "a guy that makes the brand." Under new manager Willie Randolph, the Mets improved from 71 wins in 2004 to 83 wins in 2005, staying in the hunt for the postseason until the last week of the season.

Minaya's work in the 2005 offseason would further shape the franchise, adding closer Billy Wagner, first baseman Carlos Delgado and veteran catcher Paul Lo Duca. He also strengthened the bench by adding utility infielder José Valentín, first baseman Julio Franco and outfielder Endy Chávez. Bullpen acquisitions included Chad Bradford, Jorge Julio, and Duaner Sánchez. Despite the veteran additions, Minaya was able to limit payroll by trading Mike Cameron to the San Diego Padres for Xavier Nady and Kris Benson to the Baltimore Orioles for Jorge Julio and John Maine.

In 2006 the Mets won the National League East by 12 games, finishing first with a National-League-best and Major League-tied 97 wins. During the season, Minaya fortified the team by making additional trades, acquiring Orlando Hernández (for Jorge Julio) and Óliver Pérez and Roberto Hernández (for Xavier Nady) and trading away second baseman Kazuo Matsui.

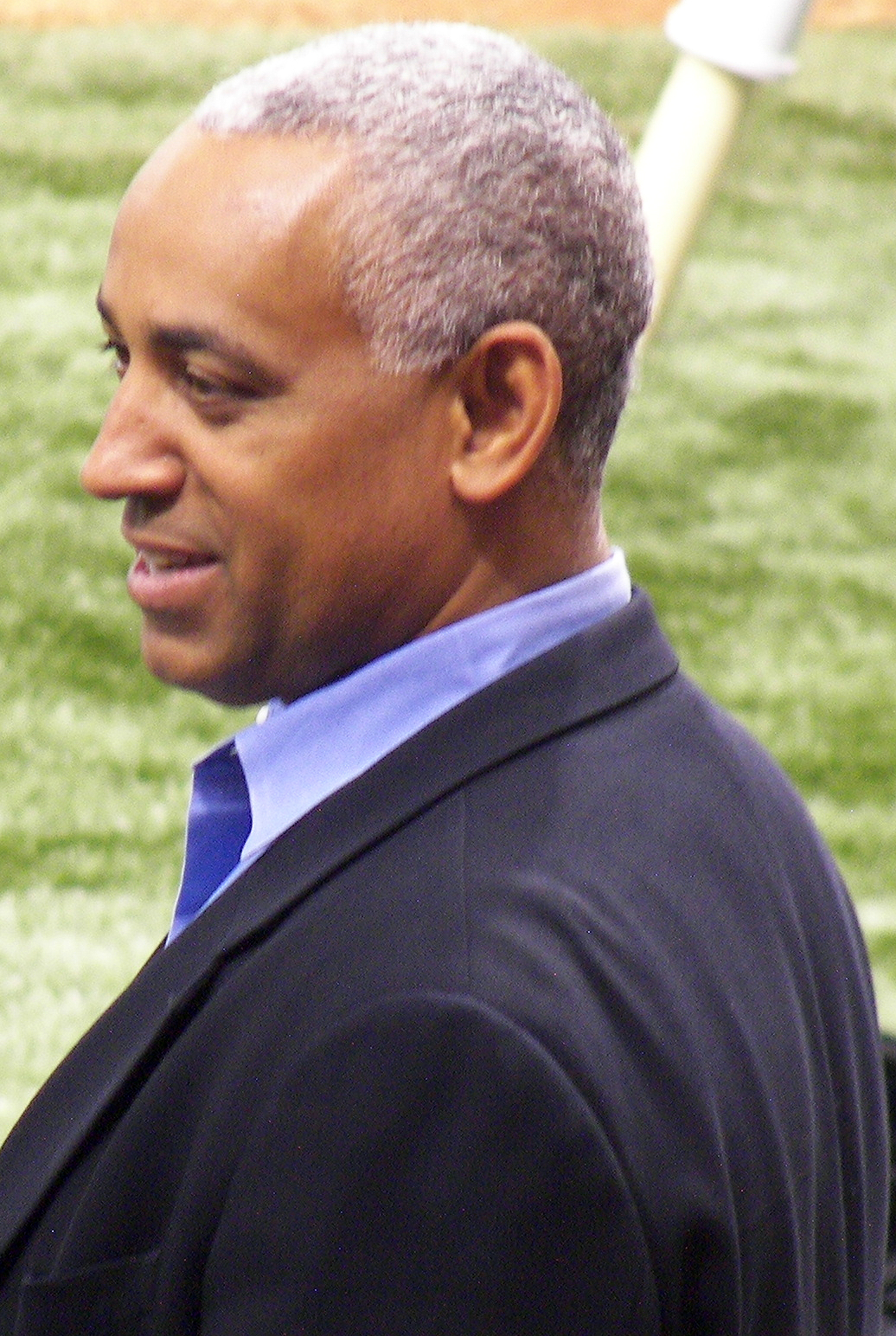
Minaya in 2007

Minaya and the Mets were featured in the Sports Illustrated cover story for the June 18, 2007 issue. The article focused on Minaya's upbringing in the Dominican Republic and Queens, as well as his brief minor league playing career, his two years playing professional baseball in Tuscany, and time as an international scout in the Rangers' organization.

The Mets signed Moisés Alou to multiple lucrative contracts, but Alou was plagued with injuries during his Mets career. Minaya also traded away several young pitchers many fans believed could have helped the Mets avert their historic breakdown at the end of the 2007 season. In November 2006, Minaya sent Heath Bell and Royce Ring to the Padres for Ben Johnson and Jon Adkins. A few days later, he sent hard-throwing relievers Henry Owens and Matt Lindstrom to the Florida Marlins for lefties Jason Vargas and Adam Bostick. The following month, he traded starting pitcher Brian Bannister (son of former major league pitcher Floyd Bannister) to the Kansas City Royals for a live bullpen arm in Ambiorix Burgos. Some of the young pitchers dealt away by Minaya, most notably Bell, thrived with their new teams, while the Mets netted little on those deals.

Minaya's biggest acquisition came on January 29, 2008, when he reached a tentative deal with the Minnesota Twins to send Carlos Gómez, Philip Humber, Kevin Mulvey, and Deolis Guerra to the Twins for ace pitcher Johan Santana. The trade became official after Santana was signed to a contract extension and passed a physical. Gómez was the only one of these four players to have a significant major league career, primarily with the Brewers, after just two years with the Twins. The next off-season, Minaya needed to address the bullpen. On December 9, he signed closer Francisco Rodríguez to a three-year deal. Rodriguez had been coming off a major league record of 62 saves in the 2008 season. Three days later, Minaya acquired J. J. Putz from the Mariners in a three-team deal. On January 5, 2010, Minaya signed outfielder Jason Bay to a four-year deal. (As Expos general manager, Minaya traded Bay to the Mets in 2002.)

He was fired from the New York Mets organization on October 4, 2010, along with Manager Jerry Manuel.

==== Willie Randolph firing ====
Minaya was subject to intense scrutiny and criticism from many in Major League Baseball and by the New York City media for his handling of the firing of Willie Randolph as the Mets manager. Many members of the media and fans criticized the timing of the decision, a day into a west coast road trip, and some referred to the late night episode as the Mets' "Midnight Massacre." He fired Randolph in Randolph's hotel room in California after Randolph finished managing the first game of the Mets series with the Los Angeles Angels of Anaheim, a game which they won, 9-6. Minaya also fired pitching coach Rick Peterson and first base coach Tom Nieto. Randolph was removed from his position with no media present and the decision came to light through a press release from Minaya at 3:12 am EDT (12:12 am PDT); as such, many of the Mets team members were unaware that this had transpired and, upon being informed (not by Mets management, but by various team reporters and commentators) expressed shock and disbelief. Randolph's job was in question for the two to three weeks prior to the decision being made, and the uncertainty of Randolph's job had been more at the forefront of the questions surrounding the team than the actual baseball they had been playing. Jerry Manuel, Randolph's bench coach, was appointed the interim manager of the Mets. Coaches Ken Oberkfell (new first base coach), Dan Warthen (new pitching coach), and Luis Aguayo (new third base coach) also joined the team after this decision (Sandy Alomar Sr. became Manuel's bench coach). During his 5 pm EST press conference from California, Minaya confirmed that Manuel would remain as the Mets manager during the remainder of the 2008 season. On October 3, 2008, it was reported Manuel had agreed to a two-year deal to remain Mets manager, with a club option for a third year.

==== Tony Bernazard firing ====
On July 27, 2009, the Mets organization issued a statement announcing the firing of Vice President of Development Tony Bernazard by Minaya saying, in part, "I spoke with Tony [Bernazard] this morning and informed him of my decision to terminate his employment with the Mets", confirming an earlier report. At the press conference announcing the firing, Minaya angrily challenged the accuracy of past news reports, claiming New York Daily News reporter Adam Rubin, who initially broke the story about Bernazard challenging Binghamton Mets players to a fight, was angling for a position in the Mets organization. This led to a heated exchange of words between the two, with Rubin calling Minaya "despicable." Shortly after the press conference, Minaya said that he stood by his comments about Rubin but acknowledged it "was not the proper forum to raise those issues." Three days later, Minaya personally apologized to Rubin for his remarks.

=== San Diego Padres ===
On December 2, 2011, Minaya was hired by the San Diego Padres as senior vice president of baseball operations. Minaya left the position in January 2015 joining the Major League Baseball Players Association as a senior adviser to executive director Tony Clark.

=== New York Mets (third stint) ===
On December 22, 2017, Minaya was hired by the New York Mets as a special assistant to general manager Sandy Alderson. After Sandy Alderson took a leave of absence from the Mets in July 2018 due to a recurrence of cancer. Alderson was informally succeeded on an interim basis by John Ricco, Minaya, and J. P. Ricciardi.

After Steve Cohen purchased the team on November 6, 2020, Minaya - along with much of the front office - was dismissed.

Minaya was rehired once again by the Mets in January 2021 in an ambassadorship role while also helping to reach out to the Latino community.

On February 2, 2022, Minaya was hired by Major League Baseball to serve as a consultant for amateur scouting initiatives.

=== New York Yankees ===
On January 5, 2023, Minaya was hired by the New York Yankees as a senior advisor to baseball operations. Following the 2026 season, he was let go in an organizational shakeup.

== Personal life ==
His wife, Rachel Albright Minaya, was found dead in their Harrington Park, New Jersey, home on July 20, 2024. They have two sons, Justin and Teddy. Justin Minaya plays in the NBA for the Portland Trail Blazers.

On January 6, 2009, President George W. Bush appointed Minaya to a position on his Council on Physical Fitness and Sports. Minaya's term lasted 16 months. As stated by mlb.com writer Anthony DiComo, "the council serves as a catalyst to promote health and fitness through participation in physical activity and sports."

Preceded by Larry Beinfest	Montreal Expos General Manager; 2002–2004	Succeeded by Team Moved
Preceded by Jim Duquette	New York Mets General Manager; 2005–2010	Succeeded by Sandy Alderson
