= History of the New York Mets =

The history of the New York Mets began in 1962 when the team was introduced as part of the first expansion in the National League (NL) in the 20th century. The team has won two World Series championships and five NL pennants. The team's current owner is Steve Cohen, the president is David Stearns, and the manager is Andy Green.

== Franchise history ==
=== Founding of the Mets ===
In 1957, the Brooklyn Dodgers and New York Giants relocated from New York to Los Angeles and San Francisco, California, respectively, leaving the largest city in the United States with no NL franchise (and only one team overall, the American League's New York Yankees).

Two years later, on July 27, 1959, New York-based attorney William Shea announced the formation of a third major baseball league, the Continental League. Shea tried to get several existing NL clubs to move, including the Philadelphia Phillies and the Cincinnati Reds, but no club was interested in doing so.

One of the Continental League's five charter members was to be a team in New York City. Majority interest in the club was held by Joan Whitney Payson and Charles Shipman Payson, former minority owners of the Giants. The second largest stake in the club was held by George Herbert Walker Jr. (uncle of the future President George H. W. Bush), who served as the vice president and treasurer until 1977. Former Giants director M. Donald Grant became chairman of the board. Grant had represented the Paysons' interests on the Giants' board; and had been the only board member to oppose the team's move west.

The NL and AL, each of which had considerably more autonomy from MLB at the time, responded with plans to add four new teams, two in each league. One of the new NL teams was to be placed in New York. The NL offered this new franchise to the Continental League's New York group, provided that they commit to building a new ballpark. Shea told New York City Mayor Robert F. Wagner, Jr. that he had to personally cable all of the NL team owners and guarantee that the city would build a new facility.

The new team required a new name, and many were suggested. Among the finalists were "Bees," "Burros," "Continentals," "Skyscrapers," "Skyliners," "Jets," "Empires" and "Islanders.". Although Payson had admitted a preference for "Meadowlarks", the owners ultimately selected "Mets", because it was closely related to the club's already-existing corporate name, "New York Metropolitan Baseball Club, Inc." The name is also an ode to the New York Metropolitans, a late 19th century New York team in the American Association from 1880 to 1887. In addition, the brevity would naturally fit in newspaper headlines. The name was received with broad approval among fans and the press. Two of the finalists that were not selected would eventually be used by other New York sports teams. The American Football League's New York Titans would change their nickname to the "Jets" before the 1964 AFL season. In 1972 the National Hockey League expanded to Long Island with the new team calling itself the New York Islanders.

From the beginning, the Mets sought to appeal to the large contingent of former Giants and Dodgers fans. The Mets' team colors of orange (from the Giants) and blue (from the Dodgers) were chosen as a direct nod to the NL's past in New York. The Mets also paid homage to the Giants by adopting their interlocking "NY" cap insignia for their own. Orange and blue are also New York City's official colors, appearing on its city flag. Though the Giants and Dodgers had been bitter rivals since the 19th century, most of the despondent members of each clubs fan base joined in support of the Mets. The Mets have continued to honor the Giants and Dodgers legacy into the 21st century, most notably in their home ballpark Citi Field, whose outside and entry rotunda was inspired by the Dodgers home ball park Ebbets Field. In addition to that, in 2022 the Mets retired the number 24 of Willie Mays, thus fulfilling a promise made by Payson to Mays to retire his number. Mays, the long-time Giant, returned to New York to play with the Mets for the final two seasons of his career and also served as a team coach after his retirement from playing.

=== Ballparks ===
The Mets began play in 1962 and played home games at the historic Polo Grounds in Upper Manhattan, which it shared with the American Football League's New York Titans, who had been playing there since 1960. The Polo Grounds, formerly the home of the NL's New York Giants, the AL's New York Yankees (in the early 20th century before the opening of the original Yankee Stadium across the Harlem River from the Polo Grounds in 1923) and the National Football League's New York Giants, needed a heavy facelift (including a fresh paint job, and new Mets signage) before the Mets moved in as temporary tenants while Shea Stadium was being constructed in the Flushing Meadows neighborhood of Queens.

The Mets and Titans moved into Shea Stadium before the start of each teams' respective seasons in 1964. The Mets called Shea home until the opening of Citi Field in 2009. The Titans would rename themselves the Jets after the move to Shea and call it home until moving to Giants Stadium in East Rutherford, New Jersey before the start of the 1984 season. Citi Field is located adjacent to the former site of Shea Stadium, just beyond the former stadium's right field wall.

=== Team Championships and accolades ===
During their history, the Mets have won the World Series twice, the first coming in 1969 against the Baltimore Orioles and the second in 1986 against the Boston Red Sox. In addition to their two World Series victories, the Mets have won the NL pennant five times (1969, 1973, 1986, 2000, and 2015), and NL East title six times (1969, 1973, 1986, 1988, 2006, and 2015). The Mets have also qualified for the postseason as a NL Wild Card team five additional times (1999, 2000, 2016, 2022, and 2024).

The Mets are tied with the Houston Astros for the most pennants—five—won by an expansion team in Major League Baseball history. Their two championships equal the tally of the Toronto Blue Jays, Florida Marlins, Kansas City Royals, and Astros for the most titles among expansion teams. The Mets are also the only expansion team to have clinched multiple World Series championships at home.

On June 1, 2012, Mets ace Johan Santana finally ended the Mets "no-hitter curse" in a game against the St. Louis Cardinals at Citi Field. The franchise's hurlers had gone more than 7,800 games without pitching one—longer than any other MLB franchise. On several occasions, potential no-hitters by Mets pitchers were broken up in the late innings. Tom Seaver twice pitched 8 1/3 innings without allowing a hit for the Mets. In one of those games, against the Chicago Cubs in 1969, Seaver only needed two more outs for a perfect game before Jim Qualls singled to end the perfect game and no-hitter.

Over the years multiple Mets pitchers, including Tom Glavine, Pedro Martínez, John Maine, Mike Pelfrey, R. A. Dickey, Matt Harvey, Jacob DeGrom, Steven Matz, and Noah Syndergaard all lost their no-hit bids in the 7th or 8th inning. In addition, Mets pitchers, such as Seaver, Nolan Ryan, Mike Scott, David Cone, Dwight Gooden Hideo Nomo, and Philip Humber would all throw no-hitters with other teams either before joining, or after leaving the Mets.

On April 29, 2022, the Mets would record the franchises second no-hitter, this time a combined effort by pitchers Tylor Megill, Drew Smith, Joely Rodriguez, Seth Lugo and Edwin Diaz; against the Philadelphia Phillies. After the Mets got their first no-hitter, the San Diego Padres were the only team in MLB without a no-hitter (a distinction they would hold until 2021).

=== Retired numbers ===
The Mets have retired nine numbers over the course of the franchise's history.

- 14 Gil Hodges (June 9, 1973)
- 16 Dwight Gooden (April 14, 2024)
- 17 Keith Hernandez (July 9, 2022)
- 18 Darryl Strawberry (June 1, 2024)
- 24 Willie Mays (August 27, 2022)
- 31 Mike Piazza (July 30, 2016)
- 36 Jerry Koosman (August 28, 2021)
- 37 Casey Stengel (September 2, 1965)
- 41 Tom Seaver (July 24, 1988)

The club displays their retired numbers on the facade of the left field roof at Citi Field. In addition to the nine retired numbers the team has honored other significant figures in throughout their history with plaques on the Citi Field facade. Among them are longtime broadcasters Ralph Kiner (March 31, 2014) and Bob Murphy (April 5, 2023), along with team visionary William Shea.

Like every other team in MLB, the Mets have retired the number of Hall of Fame inductee and former Brooklyn Dodger Jackie Robinson, in honor of Robinson breaking baseball's color barrier on April 15, 1947. Shea Stadium hosted the league wide number retirement ceremony for Robinson's #42 on April 15, 1997, and Jackie Robinson Day is now celebrated league wide annually. The Mets continue to have a large association with Robinson, as the entry rotunda at Citi Field is named after him.

=== Fan support ===
The Mets held the New York City baseball attendance record for 29 years, after breaking the Yankees' 1948 record by drawing nearly 2.7 million fans to Shea Stadium in 1970. The Mets broke their own record five times before the Yankees took it back in 1999. With the closing of Shea Stadium and the original Yankee Stadium after the 2008 season, both teams moved into considerably smaller ballparks, thus the attendance records set by each team will not be seriously challenged in the near future. During their time at Shea Stadium, the Mets outdrew the Yankees from 1964 to 1975, and again from 1984 to 1992.

=== 1962–1968: The Amazin’s ===
In October 1961, the National League held an expansion draft to stock the rosters of the Mets and their expansion cousins, the Houston Colt .45s. Twenty-two players were selected by the Mets, including some with notable previous success such as pitchers Roger Craig and Al Jackson, slugging outfielder Frank Thomas, and future Hall of Fame inductees Richie Ashburn and Gil Hodges. While the site of familiar faces such as Hodges and Craig would no doubt drum up interest and nostalgia for the team's fan base, the lack of young players with future potential would hurt the Mets in the long term, as they would struggle mightily throughout most of the 1960s. Legendary Yankees manager Casey Stengel was hired out of retirement to lead the team, but his managerial acumen was not enough to overcome the severe deficiency of talent among the players.

==== 1962–1963 ====
The Mets took the field for the first time on April 11, 1962, against the St. Louis Cardinals at Sportsman's Park in St. Louis. The game was supposed to be played the day before, but was rained out by a storm that left the playing surface still drenched the next day. The very first batter in Mets history was centerfielder Richie Ashburn. He would be followed in the line up by shortstop Félix Mantilla, second baseman Charlie Neal, left fielder Frank Thomas, right fielder Gus Bell, first baseman Gil Hodges, third baseman Don Zimmer, catcher Hobie Landrith and starting pitcher Roger Craig.

Craig would give up the first run in Mets history thanks to a Stan Musial RBI single, scoring Julián Javier. One apocryphal legend has it that in this first game Craig would balk in the first run against the Mets in team history by dropping the ball during his windup with the Cardinals' Bill White on third. While Craig was charged with a balk in the game, it in fact moved White from second base to third base. Neal would drive in Ashburn for the first run in Mets history in the top of the third inning. Hodges would also hit the first home run in Mets history that evening, leading off the fourth inning with a long home run to left field. Despite the franchise firsts, Mets would go on to lose the game 11–4.

The Mets would return to New York for their first home opener against the Pittsburgh Pirates two days later. Sherman Jones would get the nod against Pittsburgh, but despite a Frank Thomas home run, the Pirates would squeak out a 4–3 victory. These would be the first two of nine straight losses to start the season.

The Mets would win their first game on April 23, 1962, over the Pirates at Forbes Field in Pittsburgh. Led by starting pitcher Jay Hook's complete game the Mets would defeat the Pirates by a score of 9–1. Coincidentally the loss marked the first blemish of the season for the Pirates.

The Mets would finish the 1962 season with a record of 40–120. Their .250 winning percentage is still the worst 162-game record in MLB history. Their 120 losses were the most in a single season in MLB history until the 2024 Chicago White Sox finished with a record of 41–121. By winning percentage the 1962 Mets are the fourth worst team in major-league history, and the third-worst of the modern era (since 1901). The ineptitude of the Mets during their first year is chronicled in colorful fashion in the 1963 book Can't Anybody Here Play This Game?, written by New York columnist Jimmy Breslin.

Beloved by New York fans despite—or perhaps because of—their losing ways, the Mets of the early 1960s became famous for their ineptitude. Journeyman players like the ironically nicknamed "Marvelous Marv" Throneberry became icons of athletic incompetence. Ex-Dodger and Giant pitcher Billy Loes, who was acquired by the Mets after the 1961 expansion draft, was credited with the ungrammatical "The Mets is a good thing. They give everybody jobs. Just like the WPA." Even the young Mets proved to have standards, however. In 1962, Cleveland Indians catcher Harry Chiti was purchased by the Mets for a player to be named later in the season. After only 15 games and a .195 batting average, the Mets sent him back to the Indians; he never played in another major league game again. Chiti was the first player ever to be sent back to his original team in a trade in Major League history.

The 1963 Mets featured a pitcher, Carlton Willey, who was having a great year, pitching four shut-outs, when he incurred an injury and finished with a 9–14 win–loss record. The 1963 squad also had Duke Snider, who hit his 2,000th hit and later his 400th home run and earned a berth to the 1963 All-Star Game.

==== 1964 ====
On May 26, 1964, in Chicago, they played like champions (at least for one game) and pummeled the Chicago Cubs, 19–1. According to legend, later that day a fan called a New York newspaper to get the score. He was told: "They scored 19 runs." There was a long silence, then the fan asked: "Did they win?"

Also in 1964, the Mets, who played their first two seasons in the old Polo Grounds, the former home of the Giants, moved to the newly constructed Shea Stadium, a 55,300-seat multipurpose facility built in the Flushing neighborhood of the Borough of Queens, adjacent to the site of the 1939 and 1964 New York World's Fairs, named for William Shea for his efforts in returning National League baseball to New York City.

One high point of Shea Stadium's first season came on Father's Day, when Philadelphia Phillies pitcher Jim Bunning threw a perfect game against the Mets, the first in the National League since 1880. For perhaps the only time in the stadium's history, the Shea faithful found themselves rooting for the visitors, caught up in the rare achievement, and roaring for Bunning on every pitch in the ninth inning. His strikeout of John Stephenson capped the performance. Another high point was Shea Stadium's hosting of the All-Star Game. Unexpectedly thrust into the spotlight in the final hectic weekend of the 1964 season, the Mets relished the role of spoiler, beating the Cardinals in St. Louis on Friday and Saturday (keeping alive the hopes of the Phillies, Giants, and Reds) before succumbing to the eventual National League and World Series champions on Sunday.

==== 1966 ====
The Mets' image as lovable losers was wearing a little thin as the decade progressed, but things began to change slowly in the late 1960s. In 1966, the Mets chose catcher Steve Chilcott as the first overall selection in the amateur draft. He became the first number one draft pick to retire without reaching the major leagues. The second pick that year was future Hall of Famer Reggie Jackson. That year, the Mets went 66–95, the first season they did not finish with 100+ losses.

=== 1967–1968: Arrival of Hodges, Seaver and Koosman ===
The Mets acquired top pitching prospect Tom Seaver in a lottery and he became the league's Rookie of the Year in 1967. Even though the Mets remained in last place, Tom Seaver was a sign of good fortune to come. He was originally signed by the Atlanta Braves in February 1966 out of the University of Southern California, but his contract was voided by Commissioner William Eckert on the basis that the USC season had already started when Seaver signed. In order to resolve this issue, the Mets, Indians, and Phillies were all placed in a hat since they were the only teams willing to match the Braves offer, and the Mets were fortunate enough to win the drawing. In addition to Seaver, two other young players were catcher Jerry Grote and shortstop Bud Harrelson. This trio of youth formed a new, determined clubhouse nucleus that had no interest in losing, lovably or otherwise. By the 1968 season, Wes Westrum would be replaced as manager by Gil Hodges. Pitcher Jerry Koosman joined the staff and had a spectacular rookie season in 1967, winning 19 games. Left fielder Cleon Jones developed as a batter and exciting center fielder Tommie Agee came over in a trade. But although much improved, the 1968 team still finished the season in 9th place.

=== 1969–1972: The Amazin' or Miracle Mets ===
The Mets began the 1969 season in a mediocre way: an opening day home loss of 11–10 to the expansion Montreal Expos was followed by a record of 21–23 through the end of May. On April 10, 1969 Tommie Agee became the only player ever to hit a home run to the small area of fair territory in the upper level of Shea Stadium. A painted sign on the stands nearby commemorated the spot at Shea. By mid-August, the favored Chicago Cubs seemed safely on their way to winning the first ever National League East Division title (and their first postseason appearance of any kind since 1945). The Mets sat in third place, ten games behind; but Chicago went 8–17 in September, while the Mets, with outstanding pitching from their young staff, piled up victory after victory, winning 38 of their last 49 games. They took first place for good on September 10, and finished in first place with a 100–62 record for the season, their first winning year ever, a full eight games over the Cubs; the team formally clinched the first NL East title on September 24. The Mets finished with a team ERA of 2.99, and a league-leading 28 shutouts thrown. Tom Seaver led the way with a 25–7 record, with lefty Jerry Koosman behind him at a 17–9 record, while Cleon Jones finished with a .340 batting average. Seaver's best game occurred on July 9, at Shea Stadium, where he came within two outs of a perfect game, but gave up a one-out, ninth-inning single to the Cubs' Jimmy Qualls for the only hit in the Mets' 4–0 victory.

The "Miracle Mets" or "Amazin Mets", as they became known by the press, went on to win a three-game sweep of the strong Atlanta Braves, led by legend Henry "Hank" Aaron, in the very first National League Championship Series. The Mets were considered underdogs in this series despite the fact that they had a better record than the Braves, the first place team in the National League West (100–62 for the Mets over the Braves' 93–69).

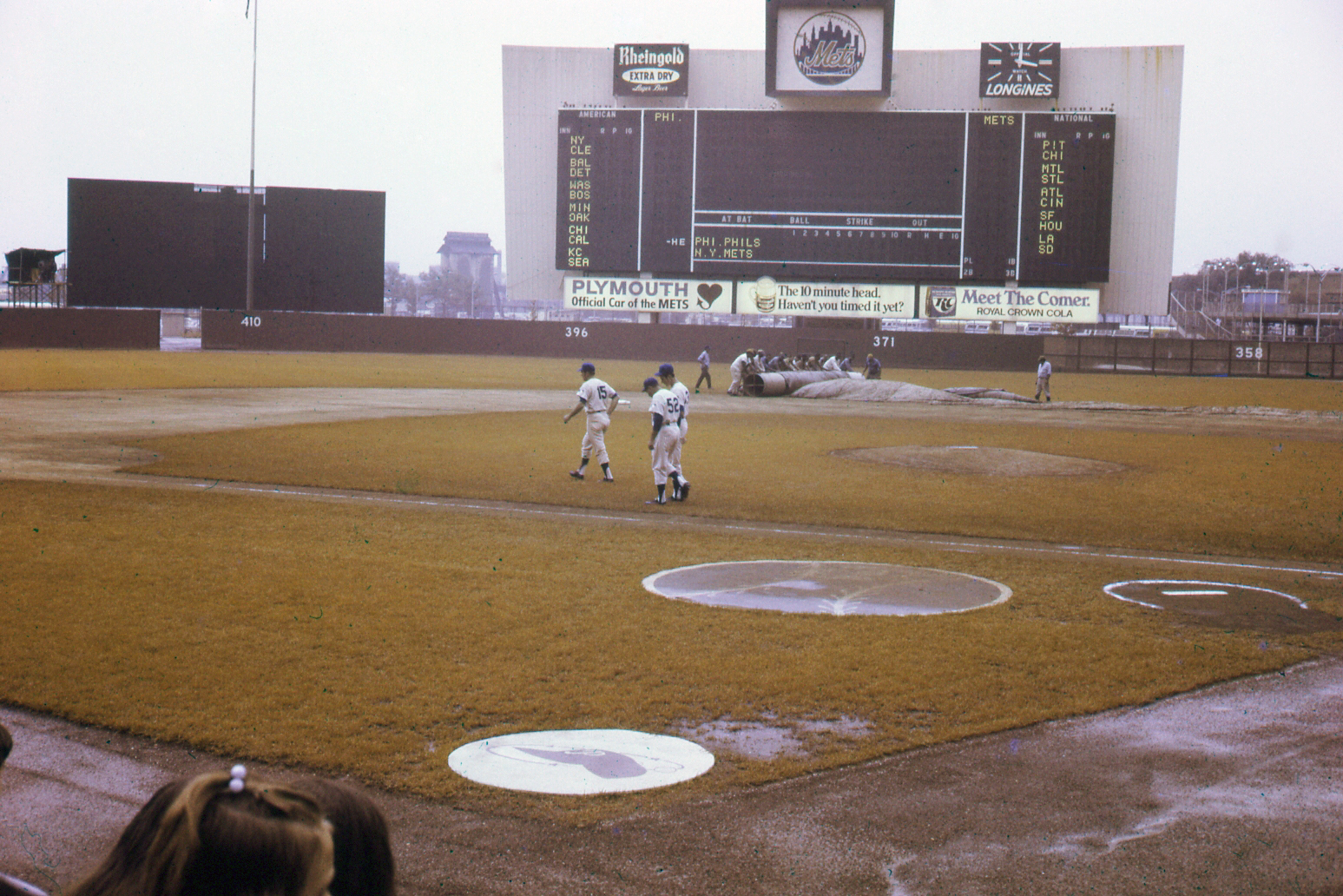
Shea Stadium prior to a Mets versus Philadelphia Phillies game in 1969

The Mets were given very little chance in the 1969 World Series, facing a powerful Baltimore Orioles team that had gone 109–53 in the regular season and included Frank Robinson, Brooks Robinson, and Jim Palmer as well as future Mets manager Davey Johnson, who would make the final out of the Series. Before the series began, pundits predicted Tom Seaver might win the opening game, but that the Mets would have trouble winning again in the World Series. As it turned out, just the opposite occurred; Seaver was roughed up, allowing four runs in the opener, which he lost—but the Mets' pitching shut down the Orioles after that, holding them to just five runs over the next four games, to win the World Series 4 games to 1. Seaver got his revenge in game four, pitching all 10 innings of a 2–1 victory.

For longtime Mets announcer Ralph Kiner and many fans, the turning point in the team's season, came in the third inning of the second game of a July 30 doubleheader against the Houston Astros. When left fielder Cleon Jones failed to hustle after a ball hit to the outfield, Mets manager Gil Hodges removed him from the game—but rather than simply signal from the dugout for Jones to come out, or delegate the job to one of his coaches, Hodges left the dugout and slowly, deliberately, walked all the way out to left field to Jones, and walked him back to the bench. For the rest of that season, Jones never failed to hustle.

The Miracle Mets magic wore off as the 1970s began. They would continue to produce winning seasons, but did not repeat the success of their championship season. In these subsequent years, Mets pitchers generally excelled but received lackluster support from the hitters, with mediocre finishes the result. Efforts to improve the offense backfired with blunders such as trading Amos Otis for troubled infielder Joe Foy after the 1969 season as well as young pitcher Nolan Ryan for infielder Jim Fregosi after the 1971 season. Once out of the glaring New York spotlight, Ryan became one of the best pitchers in history, spending 22 more years in the majors and entering the Baseball Hall of Fame in 1999 as a Texas Ranger. Fregosi battled injuries and played just 146 games for the Mets over a season and a half. Meanwhile, Otis became a star with the Kansas City Royals while Foy lasted only one season in New York.

The team was thrown into confusion and shock prior to the 1972 season, when Manager Gil Hodges, who had led the team to the World Series victory in 1969, suffered a sudden heart attack at the end of spring training and died. Coach Yogi Berra succeeded Hodges as manager.

=== 1973: "Ya Gotta Believe!" ===
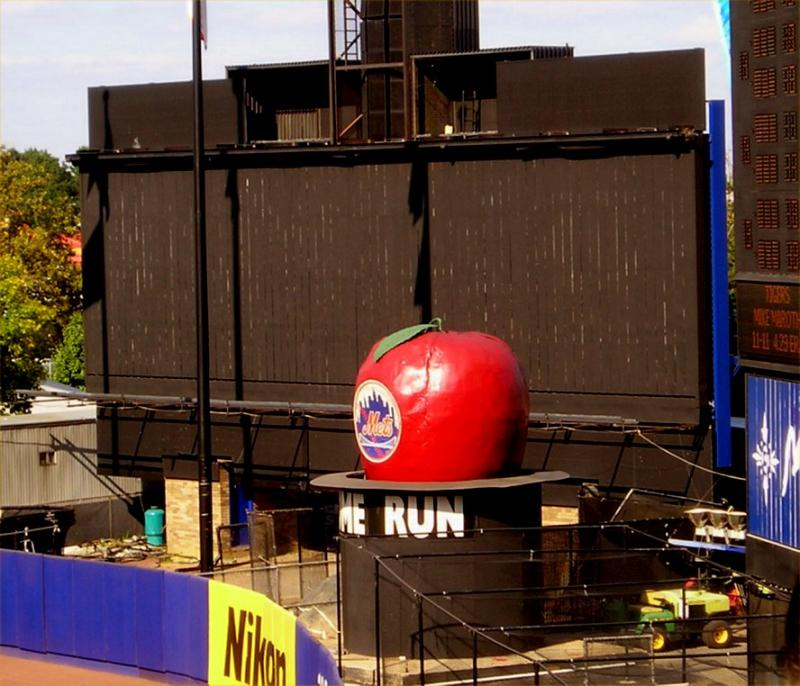
The home run apple in Shea Stadium

Despite high hopes following the 1969 championship season, the Mets could not break through to the postseason in the early 1970s, coming up short three times. Then, in 1973, the Mets found themselves deadlocked with their opponents in what was then the tightest divisional race of the century. Despite going .600 for the month of April, the team then floundered as the season progressed. Hampered with many injuries, Berra's Mets found themselves in last place with a 61–71 record at the end of August 1973, but when they got healthy again, they recovered behind relief pitcher Tug McGraw and his "Ya gotta believe!" rallying cry (a phrase the team has since trademarked), winning 21 of their last 29 games. Berra also coined his most famous Yogiism that year: "It ain't over till it's over!" Their final record of only 82–79 was good enough to win the division while five better teams missed the postseason. Despite the second-worst winning percentage ever by a division winner (until the 2005 San Diego Padres), the Mets stunned the heavily favored Cincinnati Reds "Big Red Machine" in the NLCS, beating them in 5 games. Their record remains the lowest of any pennant-winning team but they managed to push the defending World Series Champion Oakland Athletics to a seventh game. Their near-miracle season ended with a loss to Ken Holtzman in the final contest.

This was the only NL East title between 1970 and 1980 that was not won by either of the two Pennsylvania-based teams, the Philadelphia Phillies or the Pittsburgh Pirates. Those two teams reigned exclusively as NL East champions during that span (Pirates from 1970–1972 and won the 1971 World Series, 1974, 1975, and winning the 1979 World Series, Phillies from 1976–1978 and winning the 1980 World Series).

=== 1974–1979: The Midnight Massacre and dark ages ===
After the Mets' 1973 pennant-winning season, the team fell out of contention. They fell below .500 for the first time in six years, and while they resumed their winning ways in 1975 and 1976, they never came close to winning the NL East. As the 1975 season ended, owner Joan Payson died, leaving the team to her husband Charles. While Joan Payson had been the driving force behind the Mets, Charles did not share her enthusiasm. Charles delegated his authority to his three daughters, with the youngest, Lorinda Payson de Roulet, becoming team president. In turn, Payson's daughters left control over baseball matters to club chairman Grant. Contract disputes with star pitcher Tom Seaver and slugger Dave Kingman erupted in 1977. These disputes came to a head when both players were traded on June 15, the trading deadline, to the Cincinnati Reds and San Diego Padres, respectively, in what New York tabloids dubbed "The Midnight Massacre". The Mets received six players in the two deals, but none had any lasting impact. Attendance dropped, to the point where Shea Stadium was nicknamed "Grant's Tomb". Coincidentally, the Yankees began their resurgence at roughly the same time, further eroding the Mets' fan base.

The team finished in last place yet again in 1978. By this time, it was obvious that Grant had mismanaged the team and failed to invest in its future. The Paysons forced Grant to resign at the end of the season, and de Roulet became chairwoman of the board as well as president. Things only got worse in 1979. The Mets were in last place by mid-May, and attendance dropped below 1 million for the first time in history. They would not become a competitive team again until the mid-1980s, marking the first time that both New York teams were competitive at the same time, both on the field and at the box office.

=== 1980–1984: Doubleday, Strawberry, and Gooden ===
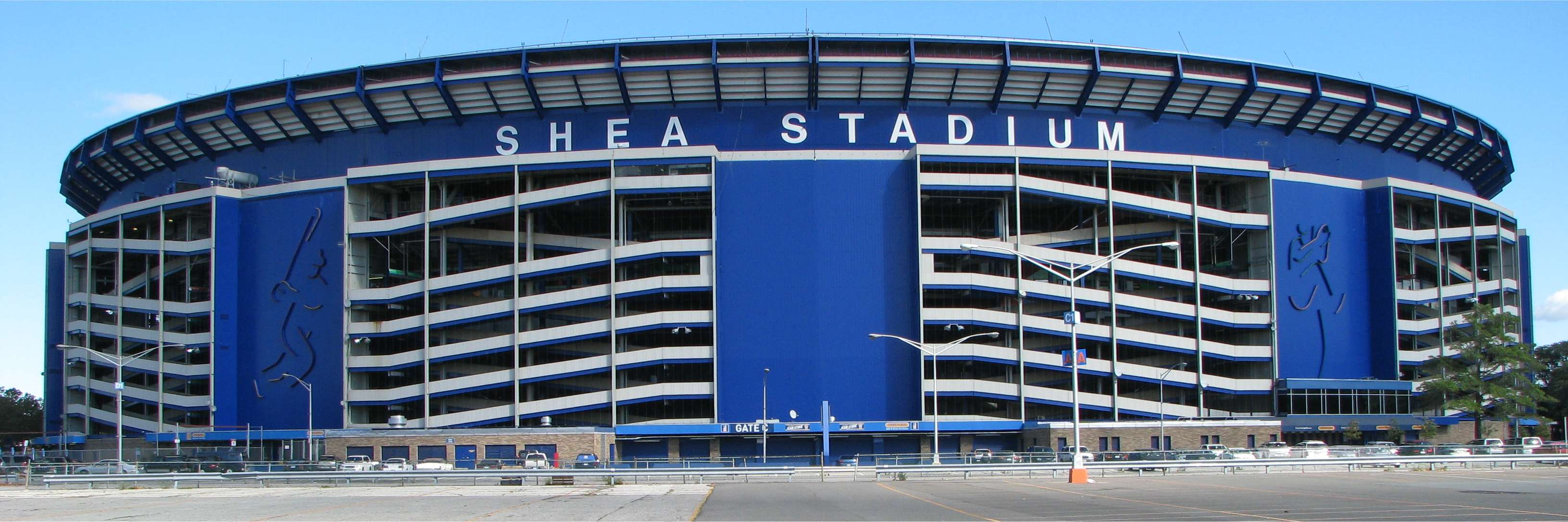
Shea Stadium was the Mets' home from 1964 to 2008.

In January 1980, the Payson heirs sold the Mets franchise to the Doubleday publishing company for $21.1 million, a record amount at that time. Nelson Doubleday, Jr. was named chairman of the board while minority shareholder Fred Wilpon took the role of club president. In February, Wilpon hired longtime Baltimore Orioles executive Frank Cashen as general manager who began the process of rebuilding the Mets much in the same way he developed the Orioles in the late 1960s and early 1970s.

Cashen's positive impact on the organization took some time to be felt at the major league level. He began by selecting slugging high school phenomenon Darryl Strawberry as the number one overall pick in the 1980 amateur draft. Two years later, hard-throwing hurler Dwight Gooden was taken as the fifth overall selection in the 1982 draft. The pair rose quickly through the minors, winning back-to-back Rookie of the Year awards (Strawberry in 1983, Gooden in 1984). Cashen's mid-season 1983 trade for former MVP Keith Hernandez from the Cardinals helped spark the Mets' return to competitive contention. Also in 1983, fan favorite Tom Seaver was traded back to the Mets, playing one season in his second stint with the team. After finishing their first three campaigns of the 1980s decade in either 5th or 6th (last) place, in 1984, new manager Davey Johnson was promoted from the helm of their then-AAA affiliate Tidewater Tides. He led the Mets to a second place 90–72 record, their first winning season since 1976.

=== 1985–1988: "Party Hard; Play Harder" era ===
==== 1985 ====
In December 1984, the Mets acquired catcher Gary Carter via a trade from the Montreal Expos. In 1985, the Mets won 98 games, but lost the division title to the St. Louis Cardinals in the final days of the season in a memorable series. The Mets began the series three games behind St. Louis and won the first two, but faltered in the third game, allowing St. Louis to remain in first place and clinch the division.

==== 1986: World Champions again ====
Before the 1986 season, Doubleday sold his publishing company to the (then) West German multinational corporation Bertelsmann AG, and used the proceeds from the sale to buy the Mets in his own name for $81 million. He then sold a half-stake to Wilpon, making them equal partners in the team.

Unlike the league champion Mets of 1969 or 1973, the 1986 Mets hit the ground running, breaking away from the rest of the division early and dominating throughout the entire year. They won 20 of their first 24 games, clinched the East Division title on September 17, and finished the year 108–54, which tied with the 1975 Cincinnati Reds for the third highest win total in National League history, behind the 1906 Chicago Cubs (116) and the 1909 Pittsburgh Pirates (110). The relative lack of excitement during the regular season was more than compensated for by the spectacularly suspenseful and dramatic post-season series.

In the National League Championship Series, the Mets faced their fellow 1962 expansion team, the Houston Astros. Unlike the Mets, the Astros had yet to win a pennant, but had former Mets pitchers Mike Scott, the league's Cy Young Award winner, and fireballer Nolan Ryan leading their pitching staff. The Mets took a two-games-to-one lead with a come-from-behind walk-off home run by Lenny Dykstra. In Game 6, the Mets turned a 3–0 ninth-inning deficit into a sixteen-inning marathon victory to clinch the National League pennant and earn their third World Series appearance. The Astros would have to wait until 2005 to finally win their first pennant.

In the World Series against the Boston Red Sox, the Mets faced elimination leading into Game 6. The Red Sox scored two runs in the 10th inning and twice came within one strike of winning their first World Series since 1918. However, the Mets rallied and would come back in typical Amazin' Mets fashion, as the game became a famous game as the Curse of the Bambino appeared to be alive and well. In fact, it was in this series that talk of this curse began.

With two outs and down two runs, three consecutive singles brought the Mets within 90 feet (27 m) of knotting the score. Hitter Mookie Wilson ran the count to 2–1, then fouled off 3 consecutive pitches. With the count 2–2, pitcher Bob Stanley threw a wild pitch that Wilson had to leap out of the way of. Boston catcher Rich Gedman made a wild stab for the ball but it went to the backstop. Pinch hitter Kevin Mitchell scored from third base, tying the game.

Now facing a full count, Wilson fouled off two more pitches. On NBC, Vin Scully then called a play that would quickly become an iconic one to baseball fans, with the normally calm Scully growing increasingly excited:

So the winning run is at second base, with two outs, three and two to Mookie Wilson. (A) little roller up along first... behind the bag! It gets through Buckner! Here comes Knight, and the Mets win it!

Scully then remained silent for more than three minutes, letting the pictures and the crowd noise tell the story. Scully resumed with:

If one picture is worth a thousand words, you have seen about a million words, but more than that, you have seen an absolutely bizarre finish to Game 6 of the 1986 World Series. The Mets are not only alive, they are well, and they will play the Red Sox in Game 7 tomorrow!

The Mets went on to win their second World Series title by taking Game 7, also in dramatic fashion, overcoming a 3-run deficit while scoring a total of 8 runs during the final 3 innings. The final score was 8–5 with Mets' pitcher Jesse Orosco ending the game by striking out Marty Barrett. Orosco then threw his glove high in the air and dropped to his knees while catcher Gary Carter ran to the mound to embrace him. This scene was captured on film and would become an iconic image, taken by Mets photographer George Kalinsky, in Mets baseball history and in all of baseball. The Mets remained the only team to come within one strike of losing a World Series before recovering to become World Champions, until the St. Louis Cardinals did it in 2011. The Mets winning this World Series is the highest-rated single World Series game to date. The Mets were also the first team to win a World Series in a potential clinching game delayed by rain, as Game 7 was postponed by one day.

While the 1986 Mets were undeniably strong, they also gained infamy for off-the-field controversy. Both Strawberry and Gooden were youngsters who wound up burning out long before their time because of various substance abuse and personal problems. Hernandez's cocaine abuse was the subject of persistent rumors even before he joined the Mets, but he publicly acknowledged his addiction in 1985 and made a successful recovery. Lenny Dykstra's reputation was recently tainted by allegations of steroid use and gambling problems. Instead of putting together a winning dynasty, the problems caused the Mets to soon fall apart. Despite Darryl Strawberry's numerous off-the-field mishaps, he would become the Mets' all-time leader in home runs and runs batted in, until David Wright surpassed his RBI total in 2012 and Pete Alonzo surpassed his HR total in 2025.

This World Series championship by the Mets had a strange twist: Lou Gorman, the general manager of the Red Sox, was vice president, player personnel, of the Mets from 1980 to 1983. Working under Mets' GM Frank Cashen, with whom Gorman served with the Orioles, he helped lay the foundation for the Mets' championship.

==== 1987 ====
After winning the World Series in 1986 the Mets declined to re-sign World Series MVP Ray Knight, who then signed with the Baltimore Orioles. They also traded the flexible Kevin Mitchell to the Padres for long-ball threat Kevin McReynolds. Perhaps the greatest shock since the Midnight Massacre of 1977 was when Mets' ace Dwight Gooden was admitted to a drug clinic after testing positive for cocaine. But after struggling in the first few months of the 1987 season, "Dr. K" rebounded, as did the team. It was during the tough times that the Mets made a great long-term deal, trading backup catcher Ed Hearn to the Kansas City Royals for pitcher David Cone. The Mets would surge to battle St. Louis for the division title, but they would suffer two painful losses to the aforementioned Cardinals that would help their rivals to the championship. The first came on Seat Cushion Night at Shea Stadium, thanks to a Tom Herr walk-off grand slam. The second and more devastating loss came on September 11, as Cardinals third baseman Terry Pendleton hit a go-ahead home run that would help decide the game, and eventually the NL East title. Despite missing out on the playoffs, a bit of history was made as Darryl Strawberry and Howard Johnson, as they became the first teammates' ever to hit 30 home runs and steal 30 bases in the same season.

==== 1988 ====
After missing the playoffs in 1987, the 1988 Mets rebounded, capturing the NL East division. With stellar pitching performances from Gooden, Ron Darling, and David Cone as well as offense from McReynolds, Strawberry, and Howard Johnson, the Mets won 100 games for the 2nd time in 3 campaigns (1988 was also the last time they had finished with that many wins until 2022). In addition, Strawberry and McReynolds both lost the MVP to Kirk Gibson as they finished 2nd and 3rd in the voting, respectively. Despite this, however, the clubhouse was distracted by the presence of a young Gregg Jefferies who was just called up. The veteran players took a dislike to Jefferies, who had a habit of excessive bragging, prompting his teammates to saw his custom-made bats in half as a form of hazing. The Mets played the Los Angeles Dodgers in the 1988 National League Championship Series in a season where they beat them 10 out of 11 times but, led by Orel Hershiser, the Dodgers continued their Cinderella story season by beating the Mets in seven games, eventually winning the World Series.

=== 1989–1990: The Championship team disassembles ===
The 1989 Mets began with a slow start, thanks to an infamous Picture Day brawl between Darryl Strawberry and Keith Hernandez, apparently because Hernandez told reporters that Kevin McReynolds should win the 1988 NL MVP over Strawberry (although Los Angeles' Kirk Gibson would beat both Mets for the award). Eventually, the Mets (as well as the Montreal Expos) would battle the Cubs for the division title in 1989, but Chicago would prevail, despite a career year by Howard Johnson and a deadline trade with Minnesota for 1988 AL Cy Young winner Frank Viola. Those high points were tempered by injuries to Gooden, Hernandez and Carter as well as an ill-fated trade that sent Dykstra and Roger McDowell to Philadelphia in exchange for Juan Samuel. After the season, Samuel, who hit .235 that season, would be traded to the Dodgers for Mike Marshall, who would hit .239 in 53 games for the Mets before being traded to Boston. Dykstra, however, would become an All-Star in Philadelphia and help lead his team to a pennant in 1993.

That offseason, the Mets shook up their bullpen in a trade with the Cincinnati Reds by swapping their closer Randy Myers for All-Star closer and native New Yorker John Franco. Off the field, Strawberry found himself in legal trouble, and would check into an alcohol rehabilitation center; which forced him to miss the start of the season. In addition to starting the season with Strawberry, they would also lose key veterans Gary Carter and Keith Hernandez as they left for the San Francisco Giants and Cleveland Indians in free agency, respectively.

During the 1990 season, the Mets would part ways with manager Davey Johnson after an underwhelming 20–22 start. Johnson was replaced by Bud Harrelson, who would lead them back into the race for the National League East title. By September 4 the Mets had a 77–56 record; and were a half-game behind the division leading Pittsburgh Pirates. The Mets and Pirates would meet eight times that September with the Mets going 3–5, en route to a second straight second-place finish. The Pirates, led by the "B-B Guns" (Barry Bonds and Bobby Bonilla) would win the division and advance to their first NLCS since their World Series victory in 1979. In that campaign, general manager Frank Cashen fired Johnson from his managerial job and replaced him with former shortstop Bud Harrelson. Although he led them to a good finish in 1990 (Strawberry's last with the Mets, as he went on to sign with the Dodgers in the offseason), the Mets fell to 5th place in 1991. Before the 1991 season the Mets signed Vince Coleman to a $2 million contract after failing to sign defending batting champion Willie McGee (who went to San Francisco). This was the first of what would lead to many bad free agent signings and trades that would doom the Mets during the mid-1990s.

=== 1991–1993: The Worst Team Money Could Buy ===
==== 1991–92 ====
During the 1991 season, the Mets were contention for much of the season, closing to within 2.5 games of the front-running Pirates at one point. In the latter half, however, the bottom completely fell out and Harrelson was fired with a week left to go in the season, replaced by third base coach Mike Cubbage for the final games. Jefferies released a statement to WFAN radio:

When a pitcher is having trouble getting players out, when a hitter is having trouble hitting, or when a player makes an error, I try to support them in whatever way I can. I don't run to the media to belittle them or to draw more attention to their difficult times. I can only hope that one day those teammates who have found it convenient to criticize me will realize that we are all in this together. If only we can concentrate more on the games, rather than complaining and bickering and pointing fingers, we would all be better off.

This was seen as the end for Jefferies in New York as he would be traded to the Kansas City Royals in the offseason. The season ended on a high note, however, as David Cone pitched a one-hit shutout against the Phillies at Veterans Stadium, in which he struck out 19 batters, tying the National League regulation game record (first set by former Met Tom Seaver).

With all of the personal problems swirling around the Mets after the 1986 championship, the Mets tried to rebuild using experienced superstars. They picked up Eddie Murray for over $3 million, Bobby Bonilla for over $6 million. They also traded McReynolds and Jefferies for one-time World Series hero Bret Saberhagen and his $3 million contract, along with signing veteran free agent pitcher Frank Tanana for $1.5 million. The rebuilding was supported by the slogan, "Hardball Is Back".

The experiment of building a team via free agency quickly flopped as Saberhagen and Coleman were soon injured and spent more time on the disabled list than on the field, and Bonilla exhibited unprofessional behavior towards members of the press, once threatening a reporter by saying, "I'll show you The Bronx" . At the beginning of the 1991 season, Coleman, Gooden and outfielder Daryl Boston were named in an alleged sexual abuse incident against a woman near the Mets' spring training facility; the charges were later dropped. Meanwhile, popular pitcher David Cone was dealt to the Toronto Blue Jays during the 1992 season for Ryan Thompson and Jeff Kent. While the move was widely criticized by fans of both teams, the Jays went on to win the 1992 World Series. Their descent was chronicled by the book The Worst Team Money Could Buy: The Collapse Of The New York Mets (ISBN 0-8032-7822-5) by Mets beat writers Bob Klapisch and John Harper.

==== 1993 ====
The lowest point of the experiment was the 1993 season when the Mets lost 103 games. In April of that year, Coleman accidentally hit Gooden's shoulder with a golf club while practicing his swing. In July, Saberhagen threw a firecracker under a table near reporters. Their young pitching prospect Anthony Young started the 1993 season at 0–13 and his overall streak of 27 straight losses over two years set a new record. After Young's record-setting loss, Coleman threw a firecracker out of the team bus window and injured three people resulting in felony charges that effectively ended his Mets career; the Mets placed him on paid administrative leave for the remainder of the season, and announced less than a month before the end of the season that he would never play for them again. Only a few days later, Saberhagen was in trouble again, this time for spraying bleach at three reporters. The meltdown season resulted in the worst record for a Mets team since 1965. In addition, two of the three remaining links to the 1986 team, Howard Johnson and Sid Fernandez, departed after the season via free agency.

=== 1994 strike-shortened season ===
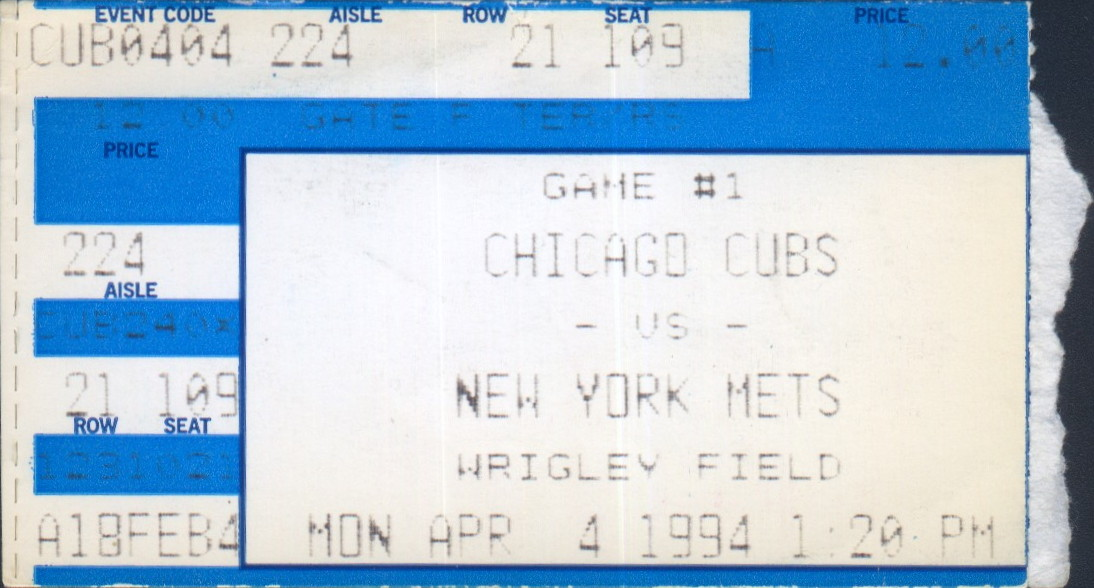
A ticket for the Mets' 1994 Opening Day game against the Chicago Cubs

The following season was filled with some bright spots, but there was still trouble for the franchise, and for the team's franchise player. Gooden, who had a 3–4 record with a 6.31 ERA in the final year of his contract with the team, tested positive for cocaine and was suspended by Major League Baseball for 60 days. Shortly after he began serving his suspension for the positive drug test, it was announced that he had again tested positive for cocaine and was now being suspended by Major League Baseball for one year, thus ending his Mets career and nearly his life. The day after receiving the second suspension, Gooden's then-wife, Monica, found him in his bedroom with a loaded gun to his head. Gooden was the last remaining link from the 1986 World Series-winning Mets team.

Still, the 1994 season saw some promise for the Mets, as first baseman Rico Brogna and second baseman Jeff Kent became fan favorites with their solid glove work and potential 20–25 home run power, Bonilla performed to the expectations of the Mets, and a healthy Saberhagen, along with young starter Bobby Jones and John Franco, helped the Mets pitching staff along. In the strike-shortened 1994 season the Mets were in 3rd place behind first-place Montreal and Atlanta when the season ended on August 12.

=== 1995–1997: Working their way back ===
==== 1995 season ====
When the strike finally ended in 1995, the Mets finally showed some promise again, finishing in 2nd place (but still 6 games under .500) behind eventual World Series champion Atlanta.

The 1995 season marked the emergence of pitchers Bill Pulsipher, Jason Isringhausen, and Paul Wilson. The trio were dubbed Generation K, a group of talented young hurlers who were destined to bring the Mets into greatness, much like Tom Seaver, Jerry Koosman and Nolan Ryan did in the 1960s. However, all three players succumbed to injury, preventing them from reaching their full potential. Of the three of them, only Isringhausen would accomplish much of significance in the majors, but as a reliever, eventually reaching 300 career saves.

==== 1996 season ====
The Mets dismal 1996 season was highlighted by the play of switch hitting catcher Todd Hundley breaking the Major League Baseball single season record for home runs hit by catcher with 41. Center fielder Lance Johnson set single-season franchise records in hits (227), triples (21), at bats (682), runs scored (117). Johnson's 21 triples also led the National League, the highest amount by an NL player since 1930.

==== 1997 ====
In the off season, the Mets acquired first baseman John Olerud from the Toronto Blue Jays for pitcher Robert Person.

In 1997, the Mets finally bounced back with an 88–74 record, missing the playoffs by only four games, and the team improved by 17 wins from 1996. On June 16, the Mets beat the New York Yankees at Yankee Stadium in the first ever regular-season game played between the crosstown rivals 6–0. Mets starter Dave Mlicki pitched a complete game shutout to pick up the win. In 1997, Hundley's great season was derailed by a devastating elbow injury and required Tommy John surgery.

Also, during the season, on April 15, the Mets hosted ceremonies marking the 50th anniversary of Jackie Robinson's first game with the Brooklyn Dodgers before their game against the Los Angeles Dodgers at Shea Stadium. During the ceremonies, Robinson's jersey number, 42, was retired by Major League Baseball. The Mets won the game 5–0.

=== 1998–2002: Piazza, the Subway World Series and 9/11 ===
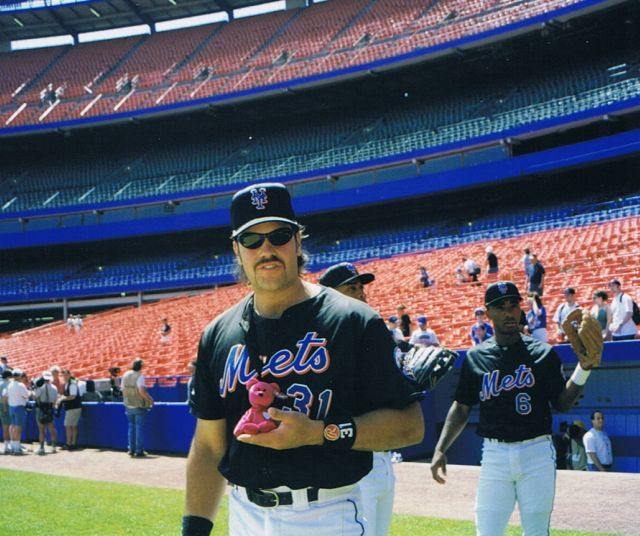
Mike Piazza on May 30, 1999

==== 1998 ====
The Mets season in 1998 began with an unforgettable opening day game at Shea Stadium on March 31 against their division rival Philadelphia Phillies, marking the first time that a regular season baseball game was played in New York in March. Both of them were involved in the longest scoreless opening day game in the National League and the longest one in the MLB since 1926 when the Washington Senators beat the Philadelphia Athletics 1–0 in 15 innings. The Mets won the game 1–0 in 14 innings when backup catcher Alberto Castillo delivered a full-count, two-out, pinch-hit single to right with the bases loaded off Philadelphia closer Ricky Bottalico.

During the season, the Mets acquired Mike Piazza in a blockbuster trade that immediately brought star power and credibility to the Mets that had been lacking in recent years.

After the Piazza trade, the Mets played well, but missed the 1998 postseason by only one game. With five games left in the season, the Mets could not win a single game against both the Montreal Expos at home and the Atlanta Braves on the road. Following the 1998 season the Mets re-signed Mike Piazza to a seven-year, $91 million contract, the Mets traded Todd Hundley to the Los Angeles Dodgers. Trades netted the Mets Roger Cedeño, Armando Benítez, and the Mets signed free agents Robin Ventura, Rickey Henderson, and Bobby Bonilla.

==== 1999 ====
The Mets started the 1999 season well, going 17–9, but after an eight-game losing streak, including the last two to the New York Yankees, the Mets fired their entire coaching staff except for manager Bobby Valentine. The Mets, in front of a national audience on Sunday Night Baseball, beat the New York Yankees 7–2 in the turning point of the 1999 season. Both Mike Piazza and Robin Ventura had MVP-type seasons and Benny Agbayani emerged as an important role player. It was a breakout year for Mets second baseman Edgardo Alfonzo and Roger Cedeño, who broke the single season steals record for the Mets.

After the regular season ended, the Mets played a one-game playoff against the Cincinnati Reds, Al Leiter pitched the best game of his Met career as he hurled a two-hit complete-game shutout to advance the Mets to the playoffs. In the NLDS, the Mets defeated the Arizona Diamondbacks 3 games to 1. The series-clinching victory included a walk-off home run by backup catcher Todd Pratt. The Mets would lose however in the 1999 National League Championship Series to the Atlanta Braves, in six exciting games which included the famous Grand Slam Single by Robin Ventura to win game 5 for the Mets. The Mets were at one point down 3–0 in the series.

==== 2000: The "Subway World Series" ====
In the 1999 offseason, the Mets traded Roger Cedeño and Octavio Dotel to the Houston Astros for Derek Bell and Mike Hampton. Todd Zeile was signed to play first base, replacing departing free agent John Olerud.

The 2000 season began well for the Mets as Derek Bell became the best hitter on the team for the first month. The highlight of the season came on June 30 when the Mets beat the rival Atlanta Braves in a memorable game at Shea Stadium on Fireworks Night. With the Mets losing 8–1 to begin the bottom of the eighth, they rallied back with two outs to tie the game, capping the 10-run inning with Mike Piazza's three-run home run to put the Mets up 11–8, giving them the lead and eventually the win. The Mets easily made the playoffs winning the National League wild card. In the playoffs, the Mets beat the San Francisco Giants in the first round and the St. Louis Cardinals in the 2000 National League Championship Series to win their fourth NL pennant. Mike Hampton was named the NLCS MVP for his two scoreless starts in the series as the Mets headed to the 2000 World Series to face their crosstown rivals, the New York Yankees. The Mets were defeated in the much-hyped "Subway Series". This marked the first all-New York World Series since 1956, when the Yankees defeated the Brooklyn Dodgers. With the Cardinals sweeping the Braves in their NLDS series, it made the Mets' run to the World Series much easier, given that the Braves eliminated the Mets from the playoffs and/or playoff contention in 1998 and 1999.

The most memorable moment of the 2000 World Series occurred during the first inning of Game 2 at Yankee Stadium. Piazza fouled off a pitch which shattered his bat, sending a piece of the barrel toward the pitcher's mound. Pitcher Roger Clemens seized the piece and hurled it in the direction of Piazza as the catcher trotted to first base, benches briefly cleared before the game was resumed with no ejections. In July 2000, Clemens had knocked Piazza unconscious with a fastball to the helmet, Piazza had previously enjoyed great success against Clemens, with 3 crucial home runs in previous encounters.

==== 2001: September 11 attacks ====
In 2001, the Mets finished with a record of 82–80. After the September 11 terrorist attacks Shea Stadium was used as a relief center and then saw the first sporting event in New York City since the attacks, in a game vs. the Atlanta Braves on September 21. Before the game the FDNY, EMT, NYPD, and all rescue workers were honored, Diana Ross sang "God Bless America", the two teams shook hands to show that they were united in the face of tragedy, and Liza Minnelli sang "New York, New York" during the 7th inning stretch. In the bottom of the 8th inning the Mets were trailing 2–1 when Mike Piazza came to bat with a runner on first. Piazza dramatically sent Shea into a frenzy by crushing a home run to give the Mets a 3–2 lead and the eventual win. The game is considered to be one of the greatest moments in the history of the franchise. After the September 11, 2001 attacks, the Mets, as well as other teams in the league, wore Red Cross, FDNY, NYPD and PAPD baseball caps. Unlike the other teams, the Mets wore these for the rest of the year, despite threats of fines by Major League Baseball.

==== 2002 season ====
In the following seasons, the Mets struggled mightily as the result of several poor player acquisitions, including Mo Vaughn, Roberto Alomar, and re-acquiring former Mets Roger Cedeño and Jeromy Burnitz. These acquisitions were made by then-general manager Steve Phillips, who was fired during the 2003 season. Phillips was credited with building the 2000 World Series team, but also blamed for the demise of the Mets' farm system and the poor play of the acquired players. His final year as a Met was the 2002 season after playing 8 seasons with the club Edgardo Alfonzo left New York after signing as a free agent that off-season with the San Francisco Giants. The Mets did have a few bright spots in 2002. Al Leiter became the first major league pitcher to defeat all thirty major league teams with a victory over the Arizona Diamondbacks. However, the Mets posted a 75–86 record, last in the NL East.

The team's 2002 difficulties reached off the field as co-owners Wilpon and Doubleday became embroiled in a bitter legal dispute over Wilpon's attempt to buy Doubleday's half of the team. Doubleday alleged that Major League Baseball attached an unrealistically low value to the team, thereby lowering the amount of money he would receive from Wilpon in the buyout. Wilpon sued Doubleday in federal court to force the sale. The purchase was finally settled and Wilpon became sole owner of the Mets on August 23, 2002. Wilpon, the founder of Sterling Equities, Inc., managed the Mets through his limited partnership firm, Sterling Mets.

=== 2003–2010: Minaya, Randolph, Reyes/Wright, collapses and Citi Field ===
==== 2003 season ====
The Mets' record in 2003 (66–95) was the fourth worst in baseball, and Piazza had missed two-thirds of the season with a torn groin muscle. His steady decline around that time mirrored the Mets' fortunes for the first half of the decade. Also José Reyes made his debut on June 10, 2003, and his first career home run happened to be a grand slam against the Anaheim Angels that season.

==== 2004 season ====
In 2004, the Mets made more poor player acquisitions including signing Japanese shortstop Kazuo Matsui, who never lived up to his potential in two-and-a-half years with the Mets. General manager Jim Duquette acquired pitcher Kris Benson for third baseman Ty Wigginton at the trade deadline just before one of the worst trades in franchise history, sending highly touted pitching prospect Scott Kazmir to the Tampa Bay Devil Rays for the disappointing Víctor Zambrano. On July 21, 2004, playing against the Montreal Expos the Mets brought up future team captain David Wright but still finished with a 71–91 record in 2004.

After the 2004 season, Mets ownership made significant changes to their management strategy. With their television contract with the Cablevision expiring at the end of 2005, they announced plans to establish their own cable network to broadcast Mets games. This investment in what became known as SportsNet New York was coupled with an aggressive plan to upgrade the performance of the team on the field. Jim Duquette was replaced as general manager by former Expos general manager Omar Minaya. Minaya, an ex-Mets assistant general manager, had achieved notable success in Montreal by making bold player moves on a limited budget. With the Mets, Minaya was given substantial financial resources to develop a winning team.

==== 2005 season ====
Minaya began by hiring Yankee bench coach Willie Randolph as manager, then signed two of that year's most sought-after free agents—Pedro Martínez and Carlos Beltrán—to large multi-year deals. Despite an 0–5 start to the season, the team finished 83–79, finishing above the .500 mark for the first time since 2001. The 2005 season was also the last by Mike Piazza in a Mets uniform.

During the 2005 offseason star first baseman Carlos Delgado and catcher Paul Lo Duca were acquired via trade and the Mets signed free agent closer Billy Wagner.

==== 2006 season ====
In 2006, led by a franchise record six All-Stars (Beltran, Lo Duca, Reyes, Wright, Tom Glavine, and Martínez), the Mets won the division title, their first in 18 years. In a runaway similar to 1986, the Mets led the division from April 6 on, and only spent one day out of first the whole season. The Mets finished the season 12 games ahead of the Phillies, and with the best record in the National League. The turning point for the season was a June 9–1 road trip. The 2006 season was also the first time that the Mets and Yankees each won their respective divisions in the same year and both teams tied for the best record in baseball.

The Mets swept the Los Angeles Dodgers in the 2006 National League Division Series. In the 2006 National League Championship Series, the Mets lost in seven games to the St. Louis Cardinals, the eventual 2006 World Series champions. Game 7 featured one of the most spectacular plays in postseason history when left fielder Endy Chávez leaped over the 8-foot (2.4 m)-high left field wall in the top of the sixth inning and caught the ball with the tip of his glove to rob Cardinals third baseman Scott Rolen of a two-run home run. Chávez then threw to the cutoff man second baseman José Valentín, who threw to Carlos Delgado at first base, doubling off center fielder Jim Edmonds for an inning-ending double play. Chávez's effort was in vain, however, as Yadier Molina's two-run home run in the ninth off of Aaron Heilman gave the Cardinals a 3–1 lead and Carlos Beltrán took a curve ball from Cardinals closer Adam Wainwright for a called third strike with the bases loaded on a full count in the bottom of the 9th inning to end the Mets season.

==== 2007 season ====
After their success in 2006, there were high expectations for the Mets in 2007, and they started the season strong. The Mets then had a 7-game lead in the division with 17 games to go. The Mets, however, would lose 12 of their final 17 games enabling the Philadelphia Phillies to win the NL East by one game. The Mets were eliminated on the final day of the season as Tom Glavine allowed 7 runs to the Florida Marlins and only got through 1/3 of an inning in his final start as a Met. The Mets became the first team in baseball history to blow a lead of seven or more games with only 17 games to play.

==== 2008 season ====
In the 2007 offseason the team acquired two-time Cy Young Award-winning pitcher Johan Santana from the Minnesota Twins for outfielder Carlos Gómez and minor-league pitchers Philip Humber, Deolis Guerra and Kevin Mulvey.

The 2008 season marked the final season at Shea Stadium, the team's home for 45 years. Throughout the first half of the season, the Mets struggled, playing .500. On June 16, Omar Minaya fired Willie Randolph, Rick Peterson, and Tom Nieto. Jerry Manuel was named interim manager. The Mets improved under Manuel, highlighted by a 10-game winning streak in July. In September the Mets had 3.5 game divisional lead over the Philadelphia Phillies with 17 games left to play. However, the Mets lost 10 of their final 17 games. The Phillies went 13–4 during the same stretch and won the division (the Phillies went on to win the World Series). The Mets still remained in the NL Wild Card with the Milwaukee Brewers but on September 28, the final game played at Shea Stadium, the Mets were eliminated from playoff contention by losing to the Florida Marlins on the season's final day for the second straight season.

==== 2009 season: Citi Field opens and the season of injuries ====
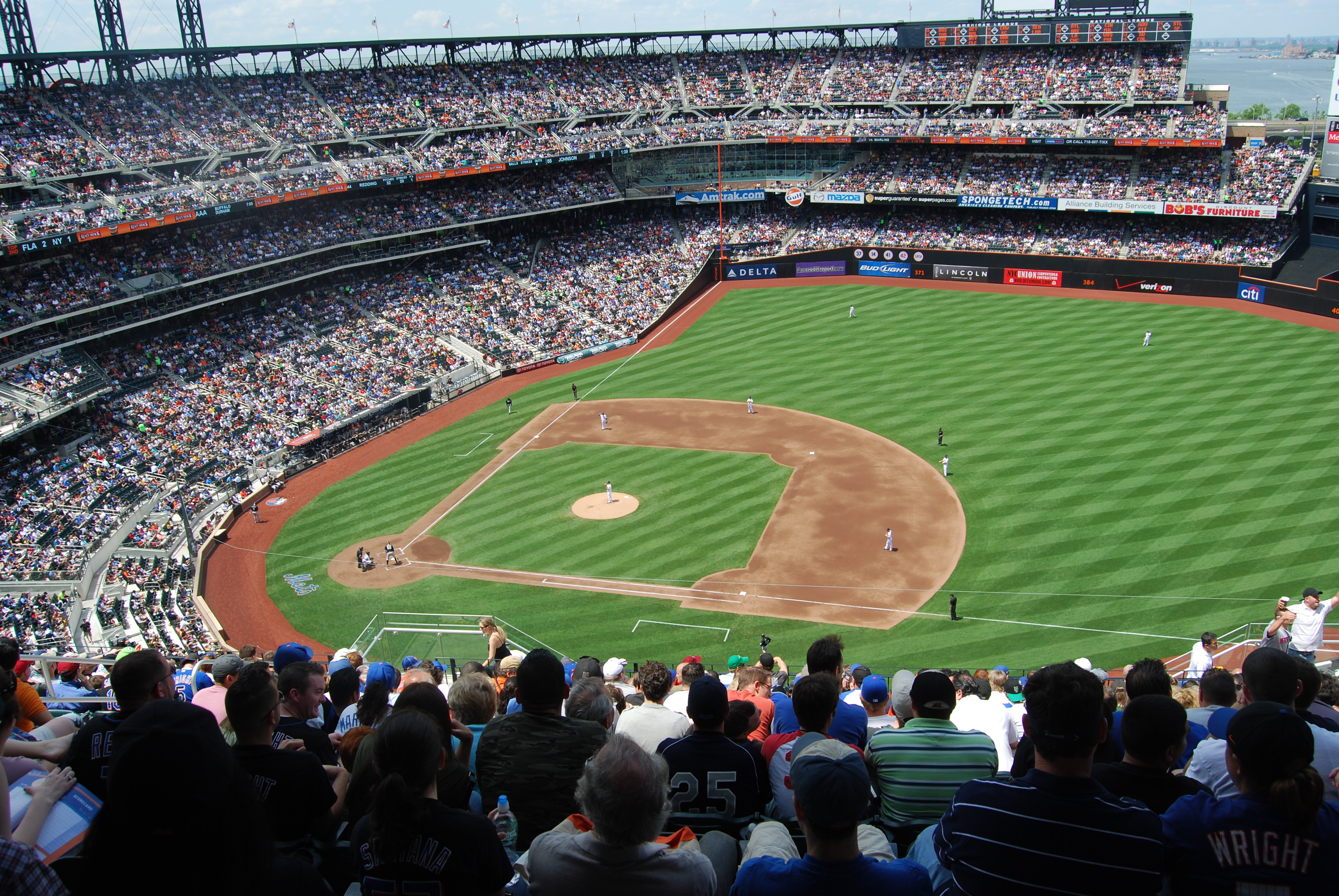
Citi Field, home of the Mets beginning in 2009

To improve the bullpen for the 2009 season, which was arguably the reason the Mets missed the playoffs in 2007 and 2008, the Mets signed free agent closer Francisco Rodríguez, who established a single-season major league record for saves (62) as a member of the Los Angeles Angels of Anaheim in 2008. They also acquired setup man J. J. Putz from the Seattle Mariners in exchange for several players.

The 2009 season was the Mets' first season at Citi Field, a retropark following current architectural trends in stadium design. It follows the brick and steel-truss trend begun by the Orioles at Oriole Park at Camden Yards in 1992. The exterior facade resembles Ebbets Field, former home of the Brooklyn Dodgers. The Mets' first exhibition game at Citi Field was played on April 3, 2009, against the Boston Red Sox. The first regular season home game was on April 13, 2009, against the San Diego Padres, who spoiled the opener with a 6–5 win against the Mets. In that game, Jody Gerut of the Padres became the first player to open a new ballpark with a leadoff home run. On April 17, Gary Sheffield, who just days earlier was signed by the Mets as a free agent, hit his 500th home run against the Milwaukee Brewers. Sheffield became the first pinch hitter to reach this milestone, as well as the first to do it in a Mets uniform.

The 2009 season for the Mets was marred by numerous injuries suffered by its players, with 20 of them having been on the disabled list at one point or another during the season and losing star (and also replacement) players like J. J. Putz, John Maine, Óliver Pérez, José Reyes, Carlos Beltrán, David Wright, Carlos Delgado, Johan Santana, and Gary Sheffield. As a result, the Mets finished in fourth place, with a record of 70–92 and failed to qualify for the playoffs for the third straight season. Mets players spent more than 1,480 days in the disabled list in 2009, more than any other team in the majors. However, second-half turnarounds of Jeff Francoeur and Daniel Murphy helped the Mets finish the season with the best batting average in the National League, tied with the Los Angeles Dodgers.

==== 2010 season ====
Coming into 2010, the Mets were looking for a comeback after a sluggish 2009 season full of injuries. In their biggest acquisition of the offseason, the Mets signed outfielder Jason Bay to a four-year, $66 million deal with a vesting option for a fifth year. David Wright came into training camp heavier because of muscle he built up during the winter. The Mets brought in Gary Matthews, Jr. to start in place of Carlos Beltrán because of Beltran's surgery in February 2010.

The team won their first game of the season, beating the Florida Marlins by a score of 7–1 on April 5. On April 17, 2010, the Mets beat the St. Louis Cardinals 2–1 in 20 innings. This was the fourth game of at least 20 innings in Mets history, but their first win. On April 28, the Mets defeated the Los Angeles Dodgers 7–3 to complete a 9–1 homestand, tying a franchise record reached by the 1969 and 1988 teams. The Mets had two eight-game winning streaks in the first half of the season, but started the second half with a 2–9 West Coast road trip. They would never recover, finishing the season at 79–83, losing the final game of the season 2–1 to the Washington Nationals when Óliver Pérez hit one batter, then walked the next three to force home the winning run in the top of the 14th inning.

=== 2011–2017: The Terry Collins era ===
==== 2011 season: Reyes leaves after batting title ====
After the 2010 season, the Mets announced that they declined to exercise an option on manager Jerry Manuel and relieved Omar Minaya of his duties. The Mets hired former Oakland Athletics and San Diego Padres executive Sandy Alderson to be their new general manager and was formally introduced on Friday, October 29, 2010. On November 23, 2010, Alderson hired Terry Collins to replace Manuel as manager.

In 2011, the Mets had their third straight losing season at 77–85. During the season, the Mets made history in 2011 when Jason Isringhausen converted his 300th save with the team, the third player in franchise history to reach the milestone while with the organization behind John Franco and Billy Wagner. Also, José Reyes became the first Met in franchise history to win a National League batting title with .337 batting average, winning it on the final day of the season after a bunt single and Ryan Braun of the Milwaukee Brewers going 0 for 4. Prior to the July trade deadline reliever Francisco Rodríguez was sent to Milwaukee on July 12 while outfielder Carlos Beltrán was dealt to San Francisco on July 27 in return for Zack Wheeler. In December they lost Jose Reyes in free agency to division rival the newly christened Miami Marlins.

==== 2012 season: Santana and Dickey make history ====
Coming into 2012 the Mets were 1 of 2 franchises (the other being the San Diego Padres) to have never thrown a no-hitter. However, on June 1 Johan Santana changed that after throwing a no-hitter against St. Louis in an 8–0 victory. This game was also notable for Carlos Beltrán's return to Citi Field as a member of the Cardinals. They ended the season with a 4th-place 74–88 finish. New York pitcher R. A. Dickey would win the National League Cy Young Award, the first ever Knuckleball pitcher to win the Award. Despite the award it would be Dickey's final season with the Mets as he was traded to the Toronto Blue Jays in the offseason.

==== 2013 season: All-Star Festivities and re-signing Captain America ====
Through the trade of R. A. Dickey, the Mets received many new prospects including Travis D'Arnaud and Noah Syndergaard. After losing the rights to the Buffalo Bisons, the Mets claimed the Las Vegas 51s as their Triple A affiliate for 2013–15. Citi Field was the host for the 2013 Major League Baseball All-Star Game which took place on July 16, 2013. Matt Harvey was the primary pitcher for the team and was the starter for the National League All-Stars. During the season, Harvey received the nickname "The Dark Knight of Gotham" from Sports Illustrated. The Mets finished the season 74–88, the same record as the previous season. However, for the first time in the history of the franchise, the Mets swept their cross-town rivals the Yankees in the Subway Series.

==== 2014 season: DeGrom's Rookie of the Year ====
Mets ace Matt Harvey was out for the entirety of the 2014 season. During the offseason, the Mets signed former Yankees Curtis Granderson and Bartolo Colón, the latter of which was used to bolster the pitching rotation. The Mets finished their season 79–83 and along with the Atlanta Braves tied for second place in the National League East Division for the first time since the 2008 season. The most notable player of the season was rookie Jacob deGrom who received the 2014 National League Rookie of the Year Award.

==== 2015 season: N.L. Pennant Champions ====
With a 13–3 start, the Mets had their best start in franchise history (tied with 1986). In April, they won 11 in a row for the first time since 1990, and swept a 10-game homestand. The Mets played .500 ball until the trade deadline. On July 31, the Mets acquired all star outfielder Yoenis Céspedes who provided them with an undeniable spark. The Mets won the National League East Division title for the first time since 2006 after a 10–2 win against Cincinnati on September 26. They advanced to the NLDS to face the Los Angeles, winning in five games. They were carried by 2nd baseman Daniel Murphy who homered three times in the series. They then swept the Chicago Cubs in the NLCS led by NLCS MVP Daniel Murphy, who batted .529 in the series and homered in each of the four games bringing a consecutive post game home run streak to six games, an MLB postseason record (Murphy homered a total of seven times in the two series).

In the World Series, the only World Series appearance by a New York City team during the 2010s decade, they were defeated by the Kansas City Royals in five games, making the decade the first since the 1910s that a team from New York City failed to win a World Series.

==== 2016 season: The Wild Card Game and Reyes returns to Flushing ====
On June 25, 2016, the Mets re-signed former shortstop José Reyes to a minor league contract. Reyes returned to the Mets on July 5. The Mets finished the season 87–75 and earned a spot in the Wild Card Game, which they lost to the San Francisco Giants.

==== 2017 season: Injury plagued season ====
The Mets had a disappointing 2017 season which echoed their 2009 season: they finished fourth in the NL East with a 70–92 and were plagued by numerous injuries. Star players Curtis Granderson, Yoenis Céspedes, Jay Bruce, Noah Syndergaard and Jeurys Familia all spending significant time on the disabled list. Infielders José Reyes and Asdrúbal Cabrera were the only Mets to play in more than 112 games. Terry Collins retired after the 2017 season and was replaced by Mickey Callaway.

=== 2018–2019: Mickey Callaway Era ===
==== 2018 season: A hot start, a dismal season ====
The Mets' first season with Callaway at the helm started extremely well, as they won 11 of their first 12 games and stayed in first place through the month of April. However, the Mets were not able to maintain their winning ways and finished in fourth place again with a 77–85 record. The bright spot was Cy Young Award-winning pitcher Jacob deGrom, who recorded a 1.70 ERA and struck out 269 batters in 217 innings.

==== 2019 season: More of the same ====
In 2019, the Mets finished third in the NL East with an 86–76 record. First baseman Pete Alonso would be named the NL Rookie of the Year with a 53 home run performance. Jacob deGrom also won his second consecutive Cy Young Award. Callaway was fired by the Mets on October 3, 2019. He was initially replaced by former Mets star Carlos Beltrán; however, Beltrán parted ways with the Mets on January 16, 2020, due to his involvement in the Houston Astros sign stealing scandal. To replace him, the Mets hired Luis Rojas.

=== 2020–2021: Luis Rojas takes over ===
In Rojas's first year as the Mets' manager, the team finished 26–34 in the pandemic-shortened 2020 season. The following year, they went 77–85, and the Mets did not renew Rojas's contract. In November 2021, the Mets made a number of key signings, acquiring Mark Canha, Eduardo Escobar and Starling Marte. However, the Mets' biggest signing was that of 3-time Cy Young Award winner Max Scherzer to a 3-year deal worth $43 million per year.

=== 2022–2023: The Buck Showalter era ===
The Mets hired Buck Showalter as their next manager on December 20, 2021. Showalter's first year with the club was an instant success, as he led the Mets to their best season since their 1986 World Series championship. The Mets won 101 games and tied with the Atlanta Braves for the best record in the NL East; however, the Mets were designated as a wild card team due to their losing record against the Braves. The Mets lost the 2022 National League Wild Card Series to the San Diego Padres.

In the offseason, the Mets lost Jacob deGrom to the Texas Rangers via free agency, but quickly replaced him by signing three-time Cy Young Award winner Justin Verlander to a two-year, $86.7 million contract. The Mets also brought in Japanese pitcher Kodai Senga and veteran reliever David Robertson. However, the team's high expectations would dissipate weeks before the season started, as closer Edwin Díaz missed the entire season after injuring his knee while celebrating a victory at the 2023 World Baseball Classic, and Verlander started the season on the injured list with a shoulder injury. Midway through the season, the Mets traded Verlander back to the Astros, Scherzer was sent to the Rangers, and Robertson was acquired by the Miami Marlins. The Mets ended the season with 75 wins, and parted ways with Showalter after the season.

=== 2024-2026: The Carlos Mendoza era ===
On November 13, 2023, the Mets named former Yankees Bench coach Carlos Mendoza as new manager. During the off-season, the Mets signed free agents Luis Severino, Joey Wendle, Jorge Lopez, Harrison Bader and Sean Manaea.

In the 2024 season, the Mets started off the year with a dismal 22–33 record. However, after a players-only meeting was held by shortstop Francisco Lindor on May 29, the Mets significantly improved the rest of the way. On May 31, the Mets acquired catcher Luis Torrens from the New York Yankees and called up utility infielder Jose Iglesias, and acquired relief pitchers Phil Maton, Ryne Stanek, Alex Young and Huascar Brazobán, as well as starting pitcher Paul Blackburn and outfielder Jesse Winker at the trade deadline. The Mets finished with a record of 89–73 and qualified for the playoffs. The Mets reached as far as the 2024 National League Championship Series before losing to the Los Angeles Dodgers in six games.

On December 8, 2024, the Mets signed superstar outfielder Juan Soto to a 15-year, $765 million contract in the offseason, the largest contract in professional sports history. It is also said that the contract has ushered in a new era in Mets history and in all of New York baseball. Despite the acquisition of Juan Soto, the Mets underwent a historic collapse in the 2025 season. While the Mets attained a record of 45–24 by June 12, the Mets went 38–55 down the stretch, and ended up losing their playoff spot to the Cincinnati Reds. Following the season, David Stearns got rid of a large chunk of the older core, including letting Edwin Diaz and Pete Alonso sign with other teams, and trading Brandon Nimmo and Jeff McNeil.

Despite reconstructing the entire roster, the Mets did not improve heading into the 2026 season. After a 7-4 start, the Mets fell into a 12 game losing streak and finished April with the worst record in the MLB, at 10-21. The Mets poor played continued through the entire first half of the season, culminating with a record of 34-47 at the halfway point in the season. As a result, Mendoza was fired.

== The longest games in Major League history ==
The Mets have participated in the most Major League games that have gone beyond 22 innings—a total of three.

- The first of these marathons occurred on May 31, 1964, against the San Francisco Giants, which went 23 innings and resulted in an 8–6 Giants victory.
- On April 15, 1968, the Mets were defeated by the Houston Astros 1–0 in a memorable, 24-inning pitcher's duel that saw Tom Seaver toss 10 shutout innings and give up just two hits. Met infielder Al Weis committed a costly error that decided the game.
- On September 12, 1974, the St. Louis Cardinals got by the Mets 4–3 in what turned out to be the longest night game in Major League history. The game ended at 3:12 AM after Cardinal outfielder Bake McBride scored the winning run. He would go on to win that year's National League Rookie of the Year Award.

All of these games resulted in a Mets home loss and all involved home plate umpire Ed Sudol.
