= Joan Whitney =

Joan Whitney may refer to:

- Joan Whitney Payson, heiress and New York Mets owner
- Joan Whitney (actress)
- Joan Whitney Kramer, American singer and songwriter
