= Operation Olympic (disambiguation) =

Operation Olympic was part of the proposed invasion of Japan during World War II.

Operation Olympic may also refer to:

- Operation Olympic: The Invasion of Japan 1 November 1945, a wargame
- Operation Olympic Games, an American–Israeli sabotage campaign against Iran
- Operation Olympics, codename for security preparations for the 2012 Summer Olympics

== See also ==
- Operation Olympic Defender, part of the Combined Force Space Component Command's responsibilities
- Operation Olympus, a coalition military operation of the Iraq War
