= Manhasset (disambiguation) =

Manhasset is a hamlet in Nassau County, New York.

Manhasset may also refer to:

- Manhasset Bay, a bay of Long Island
- Manhasset Secondary School
- The Manhasset, a building in Manhattan, New York

== See also ==
- Manhasset negotiations, diplomatic talks between Morocco and the Saharawi liberation movement
- Manhasset Stable, a thoroughbred horse-racing stable, now defunct
