= Sandra Payson =

American arts patron (1926–2004)

- Born: Sandra Helen Payson; June 26, 1926; Manhasset, New York, U.S.
- Died: July 15, 2004 (aged 78); New York City, U.S.
- Burial place: Christ Church Cemetery, Manhasset, New York, U.S.
- Other names: Sandra Payson Meyer, Sandra Payson Weidenfeld
- Spouse(s): William Blair Meyer (m. 1948, divorced) George Weidenfeld, Baron Weidenfeld (m. 1966; div. 1976)
- Children: 3
- Parents: Charles Shipman Payson (father); Joan Whitney (mother)
- Relatives: See Whitney family Lorinda Payson (sister)

Sandra Helen Payson (June 26, 1926 – July 15, 2004) was an American arts patron, and socialite. She founded a philanthropic arts organization called the Beard's Fund, and owned the Manhasset Stable for horse racing. She also went by Sandra Payson Meyer, and Sandra Payson Weidenfeld.

== Early life and family ==
Sandra Helen Payson was born on June 26, 1926, in Manhasset, New York. She was the second eldest daughter of Joan Whitney and Charles Shipman Payson. Her mother was from the prominent Whitney family. The family lived in Manhasset, New York, and would summer in Falmouth Foreside in Maine.

She attended the Madeira School in McLean, Virginia, and graduated from the Green Vale School in Glen Head, New York. She was a debutante in 1944.

== Career ==
Payson owned the Manhasset Stable for horse racing located in Manhasset, New York, and later moved to Delaplane, Virginia.

She founded the Beard's Fund, a philanthropic organization which supported performing arts groups and individuals, as well as provided fellowships.

She was a board member of the Lincoln Center Institute, the Whitney Museum of American Art, the Madeira School, and the Research Center at the New York Public Library.

She died of cancer at age 78 on July 15, 2004, in New York City, and she is buried a Christ Church Cemetery in Manhasset.

== Personal life ==
Her first marriage was in December 1948, to William Blair Meyer at Christ Church in Manhasset, New York. She had three children with Meyer, and the marriage ended in divorce.

In July 1966, she married British businessman George Weidenfeld, Baron Weidenfeld. Her second marriage ended in divorce in 1976.
