= Operation Olympic: The Invasion of Japan 1 November 1945 =

Board wargame published in 1974

Cover of Strategy & Tactics #45, which contained Operation Olympic as a pull-out game

Operation Olympic: The Invasion of Japan 1 November 1945 is a solitaire board wargame published by Simulations Publications, Inc. (SPI) in 1974 that simulates the planned American invasion of Kyūshū, one of Japan's Home Islands, in November 1945. Although critics complimented the game, it did not prove popular, perhaps because it was a solitaire wargame.

== Background ==
During World War II the development of the American atomic bomb (Project Manhattan) was a closely guarded secret – even Vice-president Harry S Truman did not know about it until he took office after the death of Franklin Roosevelt. Not knowing about the atomic bomb and its capabilities, the American military moved forward with the assumption that an invasion of the Japanese homeland would be necessary to bring World War II to a close. The first part of this invasion was to be landings on Kyūshū, the southernmost island of the Japanese home islands, in order to secure the southern half of the island, which would be used as a base for further offenses against the rest of the home islands. With the surrender of Japan following the use of atomic weapons against Hiroshima and Nagasaki, Operation Olympic became moot.

== Description ==
Operation Olympic is a solitaire wargame where the player controls the invading American force, while the Japanese defense is played according to die rolls made on a "Japanese Doctrine Chart." The game board is a hex grid map of Kyushu. The American player must, in the words of Martin Campion, "choose invasion sites, invade, and attempt to seize the southern half of the island in a limited time."

== Publication history ==
Frank Davis joined the staff of SPI in the shipping department, then moved to Customer Service, answering questions from customers about game rules. He then became a game developer and in 1972 he created his first game, Operation Olympic, a solitaire wargame and only the second solitaire game published by SPI (the first being The Fall of Rome.) It was released as a free pull-out game in Issue 45 of Strategy & Tactics (July–August 1974) with graphic design by Redmond A. Simonsen, and was also sold as a boxed set. Operation Olympic did not find an audience, and in a 1976 poll conducted by SPI to determine the most popular board wargames in North America, it only placed 119th out of 202 games. Game critic Nick Palmer noted "The mediocre poll rating almost certainly reflects an aversion to solitaire games, as this is widely believed to be the best of its type."

Davis's next game, Wolfpack, was also a solitaire game.

== Reception ==
In the 1977 book The Comprehensive Guide to Board Wargaming, Nick Palmer pointed out that "Solitaire games are especially suited to players who don't know other [wargamer] nuts, but on the one hand most games can be played solitaire (except hidden/simultaneous/multi-player types), and on the other hand it is possible to run postal contests in solitaire games, with each contestant getting the same die-rolls, though this is rare at present." Palmer liked the approach taken by designer Frank Davis, saying "Olympic is fairly complex, but realism yields to playability where necessary."

In Issue 10 of JagdPanther, Arch Young (a British writer) rejected the concept that the invasion of Japan would have been an all-American operation, and proposed adding three divisions of British troops to the counter mix, as well as RAF airplanes. In the same issue, Eric Kyllo questioned why American commanders would not have used battle-hardened paratroops from Europe in the invasion, and suggested possible additions to the game to account for this.

In Issue 11 of Ares, game designer Greg Costikyan thought that limited game design more than being a solitaire game was the reason that the game had not become popular, saying, "[Both of Frank Davis's designs] Wolfpack and Operation Olympic, were both badly received, despite the fact that both had well-written rules. In truth, neither game had enough variability in outcome or complexity of system to provide much interest to the solitaire player. [...] Both Operation Olympic and Wolfpack suffered because they too slavishly imitated traditional two-player game forms."

== Other reviews and commentary ==
- Fire & Movement #71
- Outpost #57
- Panzerschreck #5
- Simulacrum #9
- The Wargamer Vol.1 #3
