= Wolfpack (wargame) =

1974 World War II board wargame

Cover of Strategy & Tactics #47, which contained the pull-out game Wolfpack

Wolfpack, subtitled "Submarine Warfare in the North Atlantic, 1942–44", is a solitaire board wargame published by Simulations Publications Inc. (SPI) in 1974 that simulates a four-month period during the Battle of the Atlantic.

== Description ==
Wolfpack is a solitaire board wargame where the player controls German U-boats and attacks Allied convoys that are controlled and defended by a game mechanic.

=== Setting ===
The map shows convoy zones in the North Atlantic between Ireland, Greenland, Newfoundland and the Azores Islands.

=== Convoys ===
During each scenario, twenty convoys will try to cross the ocean using automatic but random movement, ten in each direction. Twelve of these convoys are dummies; this is only revealed by a close and effective examination by a U-boat. All have a randomly determined escort as protection, and an umbrella of aircraft based on either side of the Atlantic.

Five convoys are already on the map at the start of the scenario, and fifteen more will enter the map, one per turn.

=== Search and attack ===
The player spreads the U-boats across the map to search for convoys. When one is found, the U-boats can converge as a wolfpack to attempt to sink the convoy.

=== Scenarios ===
There are four one-month scenarios, all set in 1943: February, March, April, and May. The February scenario uses basic rules, but each successive scenario becomes progressively more difficult as new enhancements are applied to convoy defenses. There are also optional rules for U-boat upgrades and production.

== Publication history ==
Wolfpack was designed by Jim Dunnigan, with graphic design by Redmond A. Simonsen, and was published as a free pull-out game in Issue 47 of SPI's house magazine Strategy & Tactics. SPI also made a boxed set of the game available for sale. The game did not prove to be popular, and in a 1976 poll conducted by SPI to determine the most popular wargames in North America, Wolfpack was only rated 169th out of 202 games.

In 2011, Decision Games published a videogame for Windows 98 titled Wolfpack that was based on the original game's rules.

== Reception ==
In Issue 4/5 of Europa, Harti Ammann commented, "This is a good simulation of the Battle of the Atlantic. It does show some ~ not all — aspects of submarine warfare in WW 2. The scenarios demonstrate very well what the Germans had to put up with once the Allies had their new weapons in sufficient number, and the [German] player will usually get quite a thrashing in the May scenario." However, Ammann did not like the game's dependence on die rolling, saying, "Wolfpack is a game that involves quite an amount of luck. Just about everything except the movement of U-Boats is determined by die-roll ... I can only say I don't like it, but gambling souls will just love it." Ammann concluded, "Wolfpack isn't a game to get excited about ... After a few games you will probably have found a reasonably sound tactic, so, it will be up to the die, if you win or not."

In his 1977 book The Comprehensive Guide to Board Wargaming, Nicky Palmer thought that another SPI game, Operation Olympic, was "a better solitaire game unless you have a strong preference for submarine warfare."

In The Guide to Simulations/Games for Education and Training, Martin Campion called this "a solitaire game which works." Campion commented "The game is a fairly realistic challenge for a single player. It would be possible to turn it into a multiplayer game I suppose but I doubt it would be worth the effort."

In a retrospective review in Issue 13 of Simulacrum, Luc Olivier called Wolfpack "a perfect solitaire game: movement and reactions are programmed and erratic so it is difficult to break but easy to delegate to the system." Although Olivier felt "the hunt with U-Boats can be exciting or, at least, strategically interesting to decipher" he thought the main problem with the game was "the mechanic of moving counters and throwing a lot of dice, which can be painful."

== Reviews ==
- Fire & Movement #76
- The Wargamer #25
