= Virginia Kraft Payson =

American journalist (1930–2023)

- Born: February 19, 1930; New York City, New York, U.S.
- Died: January 9, 2023 (aged 92); Lexington, Kentucky, U.S.
- Education: Barnard College
- Spouses: Robert Dean Grimm; Charles Shipman Payson; Jesse M. Henley Jr. David Libby Cole
- Children: 4

Virginia Kraft Payson (February 19, 1930 – January 9, 2023) was an American thoroughbred owner and breeder, big-game hunter, and journalist. She wrote for Sports Illustrated under the name of Virginia Kraft for 26 years, starting with its first issue in 1954 when she was the only female on the writing staff. She was awarded an honorary Doctor of Humane Letters by Siena College.

As a thoroughbred horse owner and breeder Kraft Payson raced Carr De Naskra, who won the 1984 Travers Stakes, and also owned multiple Group 1 winner St. Jovite. She operated the Payson Stud breeding operation in Kentucky, and had owned the Payson Park Thoroughbred Training Center in Florida until it was purchased by Peter Brant in 2019.

Kraft Payson was married four times. She had four children in her first marriage to Robert Dean Grimm. In December 1977 she married Charles Shipman Payson, who was the majority owner of the New York Mets at the time. In the late 1970s he bid on a yearling at auction, which introduced Kraft Payson to the sport of thoroughbred horse racing. She inherited $70 million upon Payson's death.

Kraft Payson had suffered from Parkinson's disease in the late stages of her life. She died at her Payson Stud farm in Lexington, Kentucky, on January 9, 2023, at the age of 92.

== Bibliography ==
=== Books ===
- Autumn treasure: Down the banks to Ocracoke (1958)
- Book of Shotgun Sports (Lippincott, 1967)
- Tennis instruction for fun and competition (Grosset & Dunlap, 1976)

=== Sports Illustrated ===
- "Joel Barber's Decoys," October 21, 1956
- "The 49th Frontier," August 23, 1959
- "Duck Hunters in Paradise," January 14, 1957
- "Glory Road for Gun Dogs," February 25, 1957
- "Have Rifle, Will Travel," November 4, 1957
- "This Was My Africa," March 10, 1958
- "The Papillons of Peapacton," April 27, 1958
- "The Doberman Pinscher: darling...or devil?" May 11, 1958
- "Discovery: The Tennessee Valley," July 6, 1958
- "Down the Banks to Ocracoke," October 5, 1958
- "Big Dog in a Little Package," October 19, 1958
- "A Man, a Dog and a Crusade," November 17, 1958
- "Yes, Poodles as Retrievers," December 8, 1958
- "New Look at a First Lady," January 19, 1959
- "Adventure on the Serpent River," January 26, 1959
- "Light Touch in the Duckblind," October 11, 1959
- "The Ladies and the Sailfish," February 1, 1960
- "The Westminster: Road to Ruin," February 8, 1960
- "In Search of Snowbirds," February 8, 1960
- "A New Lead to Superdogs," June 12, 1960
- "Shocked Shell Case," July 3, 1960
- "Family-style Field Trial," March 20, 1961
- "Almost Instant Gun Dogs," April 24, 1961
- "Family Campground on Wheels," June 18, 1961
- "'Keep that damned kid away from me!'," August 13, 1961
- "Good for Deer, Bad for Ducks," September 10, 1961
- "Fair Game for the Whole Family," October 22, 1961
- "Right Bird on the Right Prairie," October 30, 1961
- "Return of a Native," November 13, 1961
- "Look Where the Big Game Turned Up," September 23, 1962
- "The Top Springer at the Spring," December 17, 1962
- "A Lady Huns with the Shah," December 24, 1962
- "One Lady Who Gives a Continental," February 18, 1963
- "Upland Shooting down on Florida's Gold Coast," March 4, 1963
- "Smart Dogs Keep on the Right Track," April 8, 1963
- "Finding New Fun in the Fields," June 9, 1963
- "She Started at the Top," August 4, 1963
- "A New Sport: Captain-Fishing," September 1, 1963
- "Biggest Loudest Show in U.S. Sport," September 8, 1963
- "The Life-Giving Spray," November 18, 1963
- "Casey and his Cougar run over California," November 25, 1963
- "A Capricious Asian is a Citizen at Last," December 9, 1963
- "Hippity Hop and Away We Go," September 27, 1964
- "A High Time on a Low Tide," December 14, 1964
- "An oil-rich Texan asks the whole U.S. to visit," December 21, 1964
- "A Meeting in the Mato Grosso," February 22, 1965
- "Some Western Amateurs Fight Back against the Top Pros," April 25, 1965
- "Goodby, Kangaroos," May 30, 1965
- "Shotguns in the Field," October 17, 1965
- "The Little Battle of the Bighorn," October 10, 1965
- "Steelheads on a Rough River," November 15, 1965
- "In the Land of the Tiger," December 20, 1965
- "The Public Joins Winchester in a Shotgun Revolution," January 17, 1966
- "The Ducks Are Flying Again," October 2, 1966
- "Shooting on Mr. Bud's Place," November 21, 1966
- "Reindeer Find a Santa Claus," December 12, 1966
- "The Imp of Southern Texas," January 30, 1967
- "His Majesty, the Leadfoot," May 7, 1967
- "Thanksgiving Comes Twice a Year out West," June 4, 1967
- "Scourge of the Seven Seas," July 9, 1967
- "Revival of a Grand Old Name," August 6, 1967
- "Florida's Plunderin' Cowboy," October 30, 1967
- "A Hunt in the North Kaibab," November 20, 1967
- "Some New Battles Are Boiling in the Coral Sea," December 18, 1967
- "Top Hunt in the Top End," April 8, 1968
- "A Search for Some Bear Facts," August 4, 1968
- "The Cougar Moves Up from Vermin to Trophy," November 6, 1967
- "A Happy Hunting Ground — for Fishermen," November 25, 1968
- "Natural Enemy of Wild Cats," July 13, 1969
- "A Bang-up Time in Mexico," October 5, 1969
- "Sneak Preview from a Happy Hunting Ground," October 27, 1969
- "Meanwhile Back at the Coffield Ranch..." November 10, 1969
- "Plight of the People Bird," November 17, 1969
- "Hot Tips for Cold Days," January 26, 1970
- "All This and Rainbows, Too," March 2, 1970
- "Bucking up the Pakistanis," April 26, 1970
- "Spin-cast Flies — Toothpaste Tubes and Wire," June 7, 1970
- "A Modern Johnny Appleseed," November 30, 1970
- "A Player in the Game of Life," March 27, 1972
- "Black Future for the White-Crown," April 17, 1972
- "On the Horns of a Dilemma," April 25, 1971
- "Haven for Game Hogs," June 18, 1972
- "Wild Sheep in a Woolly Land," June 25, 1972
- "One-Shot Moon Shooters," October 15, 1972
- "Oryx from Unicorns Grow," February 5, 1973
- "Eyeball to Eyeball with Africa," February 26, 1973
- "His Investment Is Going Up," December 16, 1974
- "Flying in the Face of Age," January 13, 1975
- "Clay Birds Soar Like Wild Birds to Baffle Shooters on a Grouse Walk," April 13, 1975
- "Forbes Was Bound to Bomb, Shot Down by an Airplane if Nothing Else," June 15, 1975
- "A Longtime Challenger of Doggy Dogma Goes to Town Once More," July 6, 1975
- "They Hunt to Save the Hunting," November 24, 1975
- "Gunning for a Market," January 12, 1976
- "A Bear in a Bull Market," September 26, 1976
- "Getting a Bang from Whizzing Birds," December 6, 1976
- "Meanwhile, Back at the Hearst Ranch," December 13, 1976
- "The fateful chop, chop, chop, pop, hisssss," February 21, 1977
- "Put a Rotor on the Roof, Sportsmen, and You've Got a Cabin in the Sky," March 21, 1977
- "At Payson's Plae He's Just Plain Charlie," April 18, 1977
- "If You Want to Know How to Get to Lake Scroogie-Woogie, Visit Exxon," May 1, 1977
- "Collectors Are Getting a Bang Out of Inexpensive Antique Firearm Kits," May 22, 1977
- "If You Cal Him Old Folks, Be Prepared to Duck," August 7, 1977
- "A game any number can play," August 21, 1977
- "New tune on a stringed instrument," October 31, 1977
- "Settling down in Texas," November 21, 1977
- "The Beaters Beat and the Guns They Blaze Away," February 27, 1978
- "Jumping to a thrilling conclusion," September 24, 1978
- "The Dakota Goodlands," October 8, 1978
- "You Get a Lot of Racket from the Magnificent Green Tennis Machine," December 11, 1978
