= Clarissa Watson =

American author, art connoisseur and socialite

Clarissa Watson (April 8, 1918 – March 17, 2012) was an American author, art connoisseur and socialite as well as the writer of the popular Persis Willum mystery series. Known as the “doyenne of art” on Long Island, she was a co-founder of The Country Art Gallery in Nassau County, New York, and was a prominent figure in upper class New York and Long Island society for most of the twentieth century.

== Life ==
Born on April 8, 1918, Watson grew up in the wealthy Long Island village of Upper Brookville, and later became a resident of both Glen Cove, Long Island and Sassetot le Mauconduit in Normandy, France. A member of elite New York society, Watson was acquainted with numerous famous and influential people, including former Secretary of State Madeleine Albright, author Anita Loos, former Vogue editor-in-chief Diana Vreeland, and former CBS executive Bill Paley.

Watson raised two children with her husband, Edward Louis Watson.

== Career ==
=== Art curation ===
In 1953, Watson co-founded The Country Art Gallery and Art School with Joan Payson, then-owner of the New York Mets. The gallery was originally located in Westbury, Long Island, but was later relocated to Locust Valley in the 1960s. As Director of the gallery, Watson was the first to exhibit works by many notable artists such as Martha Cahoon, Ray Johnson, Rhoda Sherbell, and Jamie Wyeth. Due to Watson's social influence and the quality of the artwork she collected, gallery openings were often attended by famous and influential people, including Grace Kelly, French painter and author Francoise Gilot, and American comedian Walter Matthau.

In addition to an author and a gallery director, Watson was a member of the Board of Trustees of the Heckscher Museum of Art, an Art Consultant to Adelphi University, and Cultural Deputy for the United States of the Association for Economic Expansion and Tourism of the Canton de Valmont in Normandy. She was also a member of the National Society of Arts & Letters, the Authors Guild, and the Mystery Writers of America.

=== Persis Willum series ===
In 1977, Watson published her first book, The Fourth Stage of Gainsborough Brown, the first in a series of five mystery novels following amateur detective Persis Willum. Of her protagonist, Watson reportedly stated, "The protagonist is my kind of female: a grown up gal with brains, charm, and attractive foibles - a flesh and blood sleuth who's coincidentally a lady." Watson frequently incorporated her knowledge of art into her novels.

- The Fourth Stage of Gainsborough Brown (1977)
- The Bishop in the Back Seat (1980)
- Runaway (1985)
- Last Plane from Nice (1988)
- Somebody Killed the Messenger (1989)

== Death ==
Watson died on March 17, 2012, in Saint-Cloud, France, at the age of 93.
