= The Fall of Rome (wargame) =

Board wargame

Box cover, 1973

The Fall of Rome, is a solitaire board wargame published by Simulations Publications Inc. (SPI) in 1973 that simulates the decline and fall of the Roman Empire from 100 CE to 500 CE.

== Description ==
The Fall of Rome is a single-player game in which the player controls Rome's beleaguered forces across Europe, as barbarian hordes begin to press Roman defenses. The 17" x 22" hex grid map covers all of Europe, while 200 die-cut counters represent Roman legions and barbarian hordes. The barbarians move by pre-determined rules. Further rules cover barbarian revolts, treasuries, and raising militias.

Six scenarios are provided. In each, one turn represents one year of game time.

== Publication history ==
The Fall of Rome was designed by John Young, and was published as a pullout game in Strategy & Tactics #39. It was also sold as an individual game, packaged in SPI's "flatpack" box. In 1997, Joe Miranda revised the game, and the result was published as a pullout game in Strategy & Tactics #181.

== Reception ==
In the 1980 book The Complete Book of Wargames, game designer Jon Freeman called this game "wargaming's version of the 1962 Mets [...] probably the worst game ever published on an actual historical subject." He pointed to the rules as the main problem, calling them "an abysmal, if somewhat humorous, disaster; the errata sheet for the game is longer than the original rules." He concluded by giving the rules a rating of "Abysmal" (the only game rules in Freeman's book to receive that grade), and rated the game itself "Very Poor", calling it "An unmitigated disaster."

In the January 1976 edition of Jagdpanther, Scott Rusch called Fall of Rome "one of the best ancient [era] wargames around" but agreed that the rules needed a lot of work, and provided six corrections and improvements, as well as suggestions for improvements in general game play.

== Other reviews and commentary ==
- Strategy & Tactics #39
- Moves #12
- Fire & Movement #22
- The Wargamer Vol.2 #19
- Outposts #1
