= Vincent de Roulet =

American politician (1925–1975)

United States Ambassador to Jamaica
- In office September 19, 1969 – July 18, 1973
- President: Richard M. Nixon
- Preceded by: Walter N. Tobriner
- Succeeded by: Sumner Gerard

Personal details
- Born: 1925 Los Angeles, California, U.S.
- Died: August 11, 1975 (aged 49–50) Falmouth Foreside, Maine, U.S.
- Spouse: Lorinda Payson (m. 1951)
- Children: 3

Vincent William de Roulet (1925 – August 11, 1975) was an American businessman, politician, and statesman. He served as United States Ambassador to Jamaica from 1969 through 1973.

== Biography ==
De Roulet was born in Los Angeles, California. He lived there until moving to North Hills, New York, near Manhasset, in 1954.

=== Business career ===
De Roulet was elected to the board of directors of the Meadow Brook National Bank in 1964. He also owned Towne-Oller and Associates, a market research firm. De Roulet served as Mayor of North Hills, New York.

=== Ambassadorship ===
De Roulet was appointed United States Ambassador to Jamaica by President Richard M. Nixon in August 1969, and presented his credentials on October 23, 1969. While serving as ambassador, he allegedly sought political contributions from American corporations for foreign elections; Alcoa gave these contributions to Jamaican officials. He left the post on July 18, 1973, when the Government of Jamaica declared him persona non grata; Michael Manley, the Prime Minister of Jamaica, requested that de Roulet be recalled after it was revealed that de Roulet suggested the United States Congress make a pre-election political deal before the 1972 Jamaican elections. He officially resigned in August.

During the hearings of the United States Senate Watergate Committee, it was alleged that de Roulet received an "express commitment" from the Nixon administration through Herbert W. Kalmbach, Nixon's personal lawyer, to receive a more prestigious ambassadorship in Europe in exchange for a campaign donation of $100,000 to Nixon's 1972 re-election campaign; de Roulet and Nixon both denied the charge.

=== Personal life ===
De Roulet married Lorinda de Roulet (née Payson), the daughter of Joan Whitney Payson and Charles Shipman Payson, in 1951. The couple had three children, daughters Whitney and Bebe, and son Daniel. De Roulet died in 1975 of a heart attack.

Diplomatic posts
Preceded by Walter N. Tobriner	United States Ambassador to Jamaica; 1969–1973	Succeeded by Sumner Gerard
