= George Weidenfeld, Baron Weidenfeld =

British businessman (1919–2016)

The Right Honourable The Lord Weidenfeld GBE
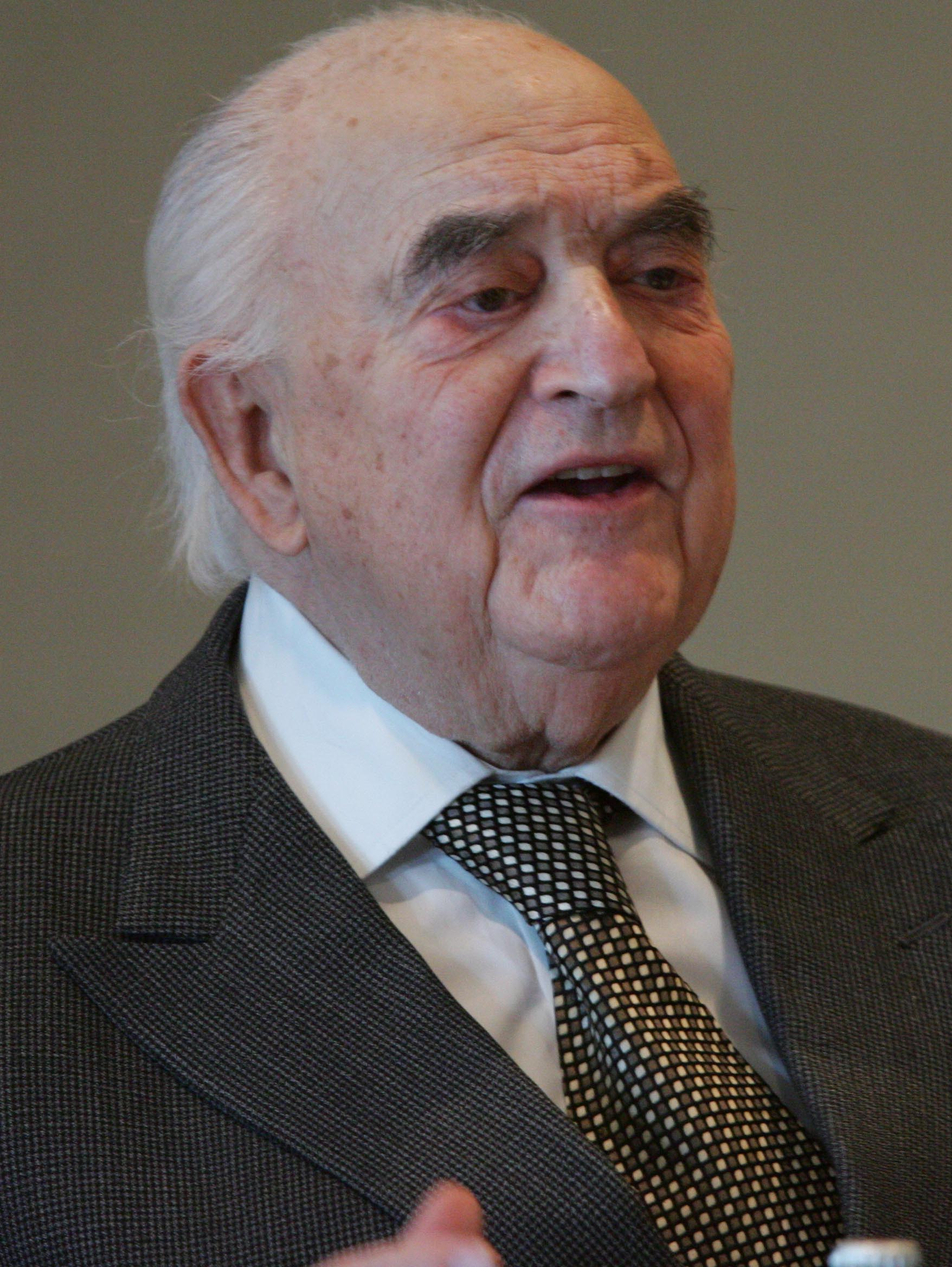
- Weidenfeld at a German-Jewish Dialogue, 2005

Member of the House of Lords
- Lord Temporal
- Life peerage 25 June 1976 – 20 January 2016

Personal details
- Born: Arthur George Weidenfeld; 13 September 1919 Vienna, Austria
- Died: 20 January 2016 (aged 96) London, England
- Party: Labour (until 1981); SDP (1981–88) 'Continuing' SDP (1988–90)
- Spouses: Jane Sieff (m. 1952; div. 1955) Barbara Skelton (m. 1956; div. 1961) Sandra Helen Payson (m. 1966; div. 1976) Annabelle Whitestone (m. 1992)
- Children: 1
- Occupation: Publisher

George Weidenfeld, Baron Weidenfeld (13 September 1919 – 20 January 2016) was a British publisher, philanthropist, and newspaper columnist. He was also a lifelong Zionist and renowned networker. He was on good terms with prime ministers and presidents and put his connections to good use for diplomatic and philanthropic ends.

== Early life ==
Weidenfeld was born in Vienna, Austria, in 1919. He was born to an Austrian-Jewish family, the only son of Max and Rosa Weidenfeld. Weidenfeld attended the University of Vienna and the city's Diplomatic College. Following the Anschluss (Germany's annexation of Austria) in 1938, he emigrated to London, with limited English and a 16/6d postal order (approximately £35 in 2026). He began work with the monitoring service of the British Broadcasting Corporation (BBC).

== Career ==
By 1942, he was a political commentator for the BBC and also wrote a weekly newspaper column, coming into contact with General de Gaulle and Tito as a result. In 1949, Weidenfeld served for a year as the political adviser and Chief of Cabinet to Chaim Weizmann, the first President of Israel. In that role, Weidenfeld launched a campaign to convince the world that Israel should keep western Jerusalem. The city had been divided between Israel and the Hashemite Kingdom of Transjordan after the two sides signed an armistice agreement earlier in the year.

=== Publishing career ===
In 1948, Weidenfeld co-founded the publishing firm Weidenfeld & Nicolson with Nigel Nicolson. Intending to start an upmarket political magazine, a mix of the New Statesman, Fortune and The New Yorker, they found that the post-war paper shortage made a book publishing concern more feasible, and the new firm was partly intended as a cover for the impractical magazine. Over the years, the firm published many outstanding titles, including the British edition of Vladimir Nabokov's Lolita in 1959 and Nicolson's biography of his parents, Portrait of a Marriage (1973).

In 1985, Weidenfeld's publishing interests expanded to the United States, when he acquired the Grove Press in partnership with Ann Getty (wife of Gordon Getty). Grove later merged with the New York division of Weidenfeld & Nicolson to form Grove Nicolson. In 1991 Weidenfeld & Nicolson's UK branch was sold to the Orion Publishing Group and became Orion's main non-fiction imprint, with Weidenfeld as non-executive chairman.

In 1993, the American company, Grove Nicolson, merged with the Atlantic Monthly Press to form Grove/Atlantic Inc. In 2005 he arranged the publication of Memory and Identity by John Paul II. Weidenfeld was also joint chairman of the advisory board of the Blavatnik School of Government in Oxford; adviser to the board of Axel Springer AG Berlin and a columnist for the Berlin newspapers Die Welt, Welt am Sonntag and Bild Zeitung. In January 2006 the Institute for Strategic Dialogue, founded as The Club of Three in the 1990s, was established along with the Weidenfeld Scholarships and Leadership Programme at Oxford and, in 2010, he founded the Humanitas Programme of visiting chairs at Oxford and Cambridge.

=== Philanthropy ===
Weidenfeld served in many philanthropic capacities including chairman of the Ben Gurion University of the Negev (1996–2004), governor of the Weizmann Institute, vice-chairman of the EU-Israel Forum, member of the founding council of the Rothermere American Institute at the University of Oxford, trustee, Royal Opera House (1974–87) and trustee of the National Portrait Gallery (1988–95). He co-founded the Weidenfeld-Hoffmann Trust at Oxford University, one of the largest post-graduate scholarship programmes at Oxford. He also established the "Weidenfeld Safe Havens Fund", which intended to support Christians fleeing the Islamic State of Iraq and the Levant, although its focus on Christians has caused some criticism.

=== Awards and honours ===
Weidenfeld became a British citizen in 1947, was knighted in 1969, and created a life peer on 25 June 1976 taking the title Baron Weidenfeld, of Chelsea, London. Originally taking the Labour whip, in 1981 he defected to the Social Democratic Party (becoming their arts spokesman in the Lords), and following the SDP's merger with the Liberals in 1988 opted to join David Owen's 'continuing' SDP. He was appointed Knight Grand Cross of the Order of the British Empire (GBE) in the 2011 New Year Honours for public service.

Further honours included honorary fellow of St Peter's College, Oxford, honorary fellow of St Anne's College, Oxford, honorary fellow, King's College London, and honorary D.Litt. from the University of Exeter. He was made an honorary senator of Rheinische Friedrich-Wilhelms-Universität, Bonn, in 1996 and awarded the degree of Doctor of Letters, honoris causa, by Oxford University in 2010. He was appointed Knight Commander Cross of the Order of Merit of the Federal Republic of Germany (1991), the Austrian Cross of Honour First Class for Arts and Science (2002), the Decoration of Honour in Gold for Services to the County of Vienna (2003), the Grand Officer of the Order of Merit of the Italian Republic (2005) and the Order of Merit of Baden-Württemberg (2008). The Bene Merito honorary badge was awarded by the Polish Minister of Foreign Affairs in 2011. He received the London Book Fair/Trilogy Lifetime Achievement Award for International Publishing in 2007 and the Teddy Kollek Life Achievement Award in Jerusalem in 2009.

== Personal life ==
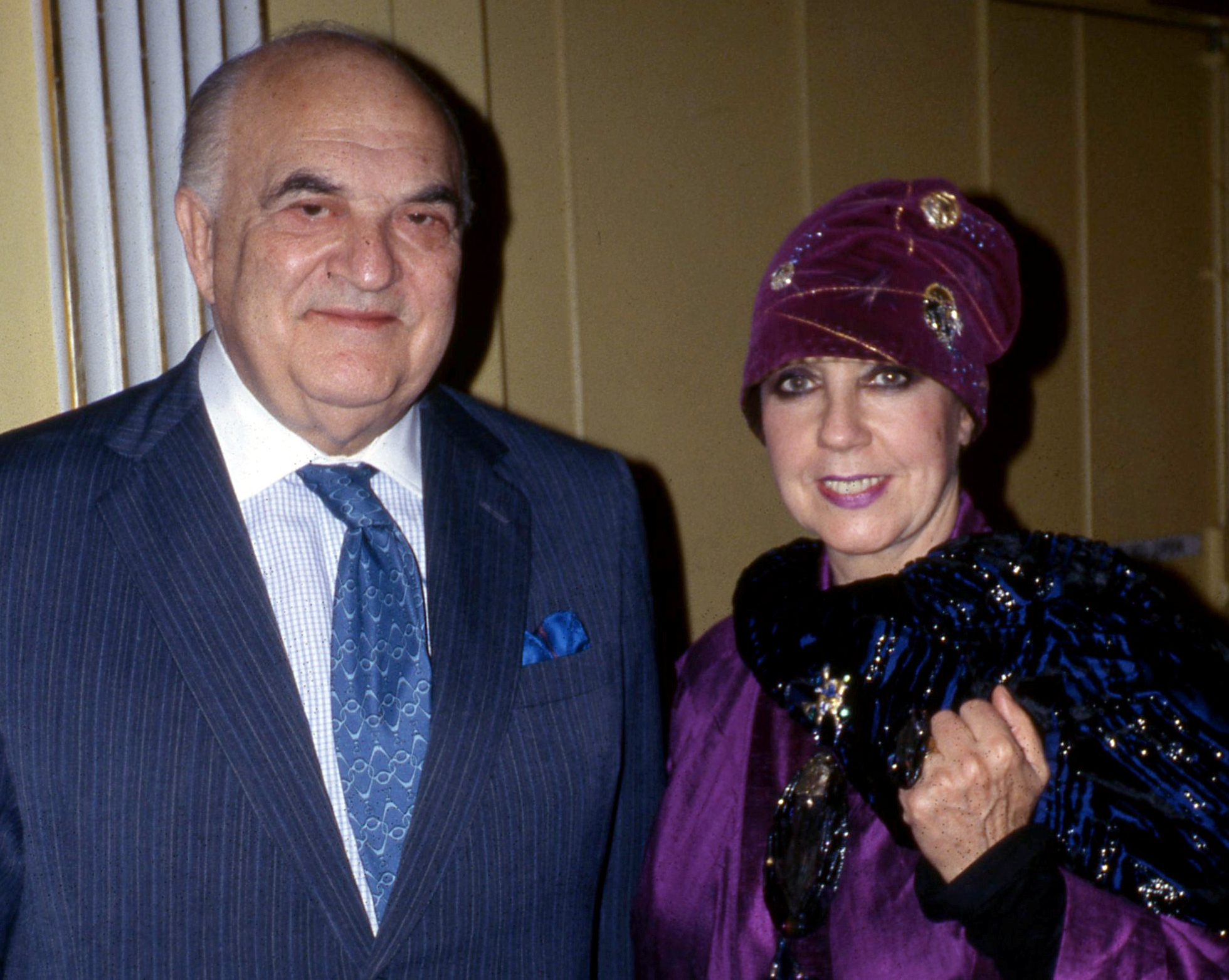
With Molly Parkin at a party for After Dark in 1991

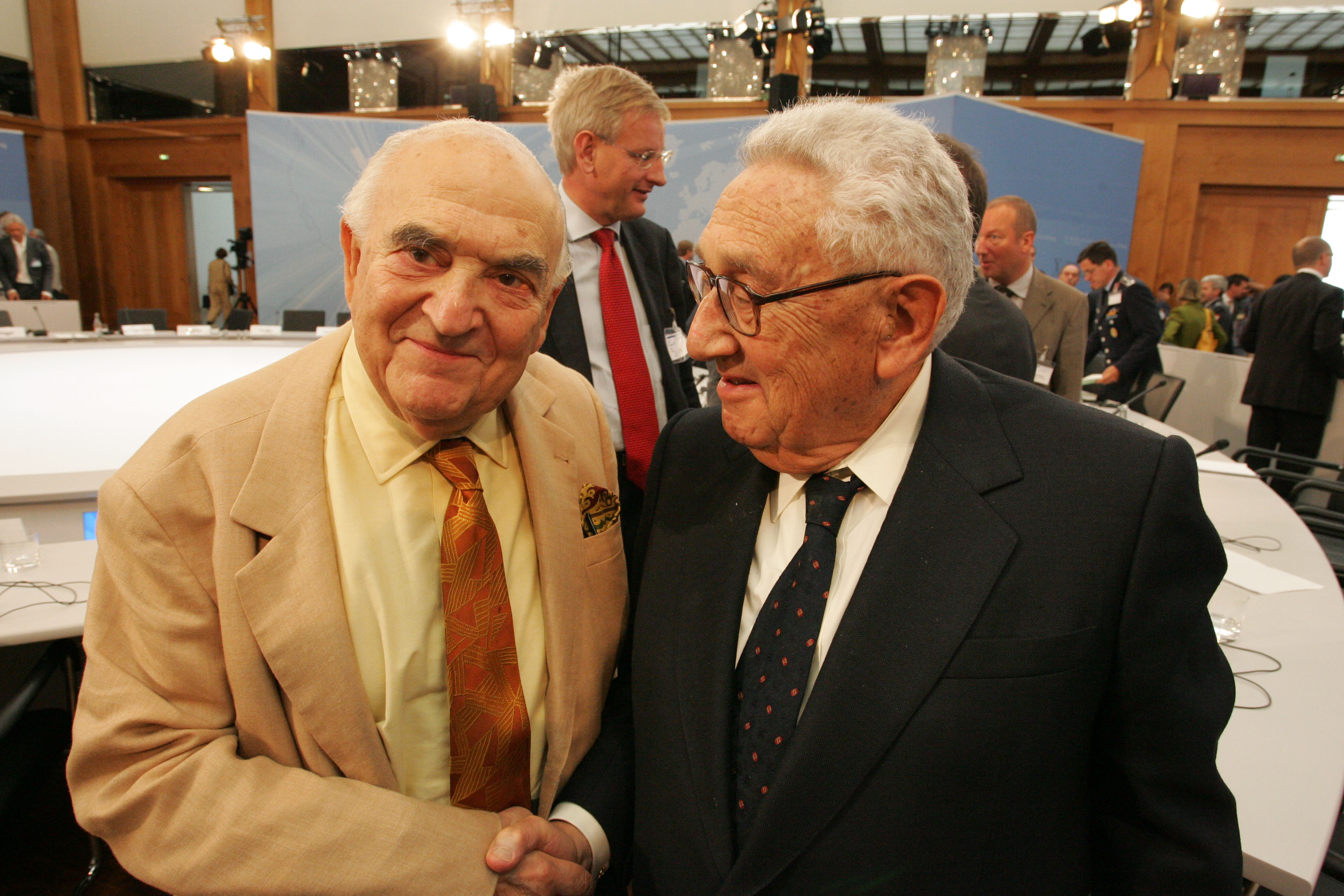
With Henry Kissinger at the International Bertelsmann Forum in 2006

Weidenfeld married Jane Sieff in 1952, daughter of Israel Sieff, Baron Sieff who was a part of the family that controlled Marks and Spencer. Before their divorce in 1955 they had a daughter, Laura Weidenfeld (b. 1953).

After their divorce, he married Barbara Skelton (1916–1996), the English memoirist, novelist and socialite, in 1956, who had previously been married to Cyril Connolly.

His third marriage was to Sandra Helen Payson (1926–2004) in 1966. She was the daughter of Americans Charles Shipman Payson and Joan Whitney, of the Whitney family. They divorced 10 years later in 1976.

His fourth and final marriage was to Annabelle Whitestone (born 1944), who was 25 years his junior, in 1992. They remained married until his death in 2016.

He was a staunch supporter of Israel and was described as an "adamantine Zionist". Among his friends were politicians Angela Merkel and Kurt Waldheim.

He died in London on 20 January 2016, aged 96 and was honoured with burial on the Mount of Olives in Jerusalem.

== Published works ==
- Remembering My Good Friends: An Autobiography. London: HarperCollins. 1994. ISBN 0-00-215856-6 – via Internet Archive.

== Arms ==
Coat of arms of George Weidenfeld, Baron Weidenfeld

Crest
A demi-wolf reguardant Sable holding in its mouth a scroll Argent.
Escutcheon
Per fess Or and Vert a fess embattled Argent masoned Proper overall a weeping willow eradicated.
Supporters
Dexter an old man Proper bearded Argent habited in a gown and cap Sable supporting in his exterior hand a tablet Proper sinister a youth Proper habited in a blouse Argent and breeches Or boots and peaked cap Sable a rapier the scabbard Sable.
Motto
Cedant Arma Togae (Arms Must Yield to the Gown)
