= Charles Shipman Payson =

American businessman (1898–1985)

- Born: October 16, 1898; Portland, Maine, U.S.
- Died: May 5, 1985 (aged 86); Lexington, Kentucky, U.S.
- Education: Salisbury School; Yale University; Harvard Law
- Spouse: Joan Whitney (m. 1924)
- Children: 5, including Sandra Payson, Lorinda de Roulet

Charles Shipman Payson (October 16, 1898 – May 5, 1985) was the owner of the New York Mets of the National League from 1975 through 1980. In 1975, he inherited the club upon the death of his wife, Mets founder Joan Whitney.

== Early life ==
Payson was born on October 16, 1898, in Portland, Maine. He was the son of Herbert Payson and Sally Carroll Brown, grandson of Gen. John Marshall Brown, and a descendant of Edward Payson, who settled in Massachusetts in 1635. His sister was Anne Payson Holt, who was married to Benjamin Dean Holt, son of Benjamin Holt. She was murdered by burglars in her home in Maine in 1976.

He was a graduate of the Salisbury School in Connecticut, Yale University and Harvard Law and became a prominent lawyer and businessman in New York City.

== Career ==
Payson inherited the Mets after the death of his first wife in 1975. He did not share his wife's enthusiasm for the Mets, preferring to tend to his other business interests. He delegated his authority to his three daughters, with the youngest, Lorinda de Roulet, becoming team president.

In turn, Payson's daughters left the baseball side to board chairman M. Donald Grant. But when it became apparent that Grant had mismanaged the team, Payson and his daughters forced Grant's resignation.

In 1980, he sold the franchise to Doubleday & Co.

== Personal life ==
In 1924, he married Joan Whitney (1903–1975), the daughter of Payne Whitney and Helen Julia Hay. Her brother was John Hay Whitney. She inherited a trust fund from her grandfather, William C. Whitney and on her father's death in 1927, she received a large part of the family fortune. The couple lived in a 1928 home designed by William Delano, on 110 acres in Manhasset, New York, given to them by her parents as a wedding gift. Together, they had:

- Daniel Carroll Payson (1925–1945), was killed during the Battle of the Bulge.
- Sandra Helen Payson (1926–2004), who was married to William Meyer. They divorced and she later married Baron George Weidenfeld (1919–2016).
- Payne Whitney Payson (1927–2023), who married Henry Bentivoglio Middleton, a direct descendant of Arthur Middleton, signer of the Declaration of Independence.
- Lorinda Payson (1931–2025), who married Vincent de Roulet (1925–1975)
- John Whitney Payson (b. 1940), who is married to Joanne D'Elia.

In 1977, he married Virginia Kraft, a writer for Sports Illustrated. She was the daughter of George John Kraft and was a graduate of Barnard College. They remained married until his death.

=== Philanthropist ===
With his first wife, he funded the building of Pepperdine University's library. In 1977, he donated 17 paintings by Winslow Homer, worth $6.4 million, to the Portland Museum of Art in Portland, Maine.
