= Manhasset Stable =

Horse stable in U.S. (1932–2004)

- Type: Racing Stable
- Industry: Thoroughbred Horse racing
- Founded: 1932
- Defunct: 2004
- Headquarters: 1) Manhasset, New York, U.S. 2) Delaplane, Virginia, U.S.
- Key people: Joan Whitney Payson, owner Louise Bailey Laughlin, owner Sandra Helen Payson, owner

The Manhasset Stable was the nom de course for an American Thoroughbred horse racing stable established in the early 1930s by Joan Whitney Payson, and Louise Bailey Laughlin, and later owned by Sandra Helen Payson.

== History ==
Joan Whitney Payson (also known as Mrs. Charles S. Payson) was the founder of the New York Mets baseball team, and a member of the prominent New York City Whitney family who have been major figures in the sport for more than one hundred years. Joan Payson named the stable for Manhasset, New York where she grew up.

Louise Bailey Laughlin (also known as Mrs. Thomas Irwin Laughlin) co-founded the stable.

Joan Whitney Payson's daughter, Sandra Helen Payson of Delaplane, Virginia, began using the name Manhasset Stable again during the mid-1970s when she became involved in Thoroughbred racing. Eddie Gregson trained for Sandra Payson's racing stable on the West Coast of the United States and on the East Coast, James E. Picou and later, Nick Zito.

Manhasset Stable ceased operations following the death of Sandra Payson in July 2004. A diamond tiara formerly owned by Sandra Payson, was sold by Sotheby's in 2012.
