= Lorinda de Roulet =

American philanthropist (1930–2025)

- Born: Lorinda Payson; May 8, 1930; New York City, U.S.
- Died: October 26, 2025 (aged 95); Manhasset, New York, U.S.
- Education: Wellesley College
- Occupations: President of the New York Mets (1975–1980); President of the Patrina Foundation
- Known for: Philanthropy
- Spouse: Vincent de Roulet (m. 1951; died 1975)
- Children: 3
- Parent(s): Charles Shipman Payson; Joan Whitney Payson
- Relatives: See Whitney family Sandra Payson (sister)

Lorinda "Linda" de Roulet (née Payson; May 8, 1930 – October 26, 2025) was an American philanthropist. She was a former president of the New York Mets of Major League Baseball, succeeding her mother, Joan Whitney Payson, in the role upon her mother's death in 1975, and serving until 1980, when her family sold the team to Doubleday & Company.

== Early life ==
Lorinda de Roulet was born in Manhattan on May 8, 1930, to Joan Payson, the first owner of the New York Mets of Major League Baseball (MLB), and Charles Shipman Payson. Though christened "Lorinda", she preferred to be referred to as "Linda".

She graduated from Green Vale School in Glen Head, New York, and Ethel Walker School in Simsbury, Connecticut. She attended Wellesley College for three years.

== Career ==
Joan Payson died in 1975. Charles Payson inherited his widow's stake in the team, but took little interest in baseball. As a result, de Roulet became the main representative for the Payson interests. She was elected team president of the Mets and named to its board of directors. She became the first woman to direct the day-to-day operations of a Major League baseball franchise. She succeeded M. Donald Grant as chair of the board when he was forced out in 1978.

Charles Payson sold the franchise to Doubleday & Company in 1980. At the time of the sale, de Roulet was succeeded as president by Fred Wilpon. De Roulet remained a fan of the team, attending games after the sale.

== Personal life ==
In 1951, she married Vincent de Roulet. Her husband owned a printing business, and died in 1974. The couple had three children:

- Whitney de Roulet, who married Clark Lewis Bullock.
- Bebe de Roulet
- Daniel de Roulet, who worked in the Mets' front office during de Roulet's presidency.

De Roulet lived in Manhasset, New York. She died there on October 26, 2025, at the age of 95.

=== Philanthropy ===
De Roulet founded the Patrina Foundation, which supports education and social services for women. She served on the board of governors of New York Hospital and North Shore University Hospital, on which she was vice chairman of the board of trustees. She sold artwork collected by her mother, including paintings by Pablo Picasso, donating the proceeds to charity.

== See also ==
- Women in baseball
