= M. Donald Grant =

Former chairman of the New York Mets (1962–1978)

- Born: Michael Donald Grant; May 1, 1904; Montreal, Quebec, Canada
- Died: November 28, 1998 (aged 94); Hobe Sound, Florida, U.S.
- Spouse: Alice Waters (after 1932)
- Children: 3
- Parent: Mike Grant

Michael Donald Grant (May 1, 1904 – November 28, 1998) was the chairman and a minority owner of the New York Mets baseball club from its beginnings in 1962 to 1978.

== Early life ==
Grant was born in Montreal in 1904, the son of Hockey Hall of Fame defenceman Mike Grant, who was inducted into the Hockey Hall of Fame in 1950. The younger Grant tried his hand at amateur hockey in Canada before coming to the United States in the mid-1920s. Early on, he preferred to use his middle name, Donald; his friends almost always called him Don or Donnie. However, due to his patrician bearing, he was called "M. Donald Grant" in most official publications even though he hated the name.

== Career ==
Grant moved to New York City in 1924, and, starting as a hotel night clerk and part-time ice hockey referee, gained a foothold in a career on Wall Street. He worked for Billings, Olcott & Co., E.B. Smith & Co., and, in 1936, Redmond & Co. In 1938 Grant was named a general partner and was, from 1945, a managing director of the brokerage firm Fahnestock & Company.

=== Baseball executive ===
Grant's interest in baseball stemmed from a long-standing friendship with Joan Whitney Payson, who founded the Mets. Payson was a minority owner of the New York Baseball Giants in the 1950s, and Grant spoke for her interests on the Giants board. The Paysons vehemently opposed the Giants' move to San Francisco, and Grant was the only board member who voted against the move after the 1957 season.

With the Mets, Grant was known for bringing fan favorite and former Brooklyn Dodgers player and Yankees manager Casey Stengel to run the new expansion franchise. Stengel retired in 1965. In 1968 he hired the iconic Brooklyn Dodgers first baseman Gil Hodges. Only one year later in 1969, the Mets won their first World Series, beating the Baltimore Orioles, 4 games to 1.

After Payson's death, Grant became operating head of the franchise. Payson's husband, Charles Shipman Payson, inherited the Mets, but did not share his wife's enthusiasm for the team. He delegated most of his authority to his daughters; the youngest, Lorinda de Roulet, became team president. In turn, the Paysons gave Grant near-complete authority over baseball matters.

However, even with the success of the 1969 Mets, Grant's baseball knowledge was often questioned by lifelong baseball professionals. Whitey Herzog, Director of Player Development for the Mets when they won the 1969 World Series, said that Grant "didn't know beans about baseball."

==== "Midnight Massacre" and Grant's Tomb ====
Grant opposed Major League Baseball's move to player free agency, a stance that particularly affected the Mets as its cross-town rival, the New York Yankees, aggressively pursued free agents under majority owner George Steinbrenner. He long believed that baseball players should be paid the same as typical workers, rather than businessmen.

Grant is notorious for the contentious contract negotiations and subsequent 1977 trade of future Hall of Fame pitcher Tom Seaver from the Mets to the Cincinnati Reds. The controversy was fully played out on the back pages of New York's tabloid newspapers, with Seaver angrily accusing Grant of planting a negative article mentioning Seaver's wife with New York Daily News sports columnist Dick Young. Seaver's anger at Grant never abated, contending years later that Grant possessed "a plantation mentality" toward his players. As further evidence of Grant's failure to foresee the future of baseball and the wealth and popularity of its players, Seaver tells how Grant once confronted him astonished that Seaver would have the audacity to apply for membership in the prestigious Greenwich Country Club in Connecticut.

Even before his clash with Seaver, Grant was known for his old-school approach to running the team. He frequently called the players "boys," and expected them to simply take whatever contract he offered them.

The Mets finished in last place two years in a row in 1977 and 1978. At one point, due to the Mets' futility on the field and low attendance records, Shea Stadium was dubbed by fans as "Grant's Tomb." He changed the team's jerseys from button-down to Henley-style and added blue-orange-blue stripes to the collars, sleeves and the sides of the pants beginning with the 1978 campaign. By this time, it was obvious that Grant had mismanaged the team and failed to build for its future. After a disastrous 1978 season, the Paysons forced Grant to resign, though he remained a stockholder and board member until the Mets were sold to Doubleday & Company in 1980.

=== Later life ===
After his retirement from Wall Street in 1988, Grant managed the Hobe Sound Company real estate investment firm in his new home of Hobe Sound, Florida.

== Personal life ==
Grant wed Alice Waters in 1932. Grant died in Hobe Sound on November 28, 1998. He was survived by his wife, two sons, a daughter, and nine grandchildren.
