= Joan Whitney Payson =

American businesswoman (1903–1975)

- Born: Joan Whitney; February 5, 1903; New York City, U.S.
- Died: October 4, 1975 (aged 72); New York City, U.S.
- Education: Miss Chapin's School
- Alma mater: Barnard College (1925); Brown University
- Occupations: Businesswoman; sports team owner; racehorse owner/breeder; art collector; philanthropist
- Spouse: Charles Shipman Payson (m. 1924)
- Children: 5, including Sandra Payson, Lorinda de Roulet
- Parents: William Payne Whitney; Helen Julia Hay
- Relatives: See Whitney family
- Baseball career

Career highlights and awards
- World Series champion (1969); New York Mets Hall of Fame

Joan Whitney Payson (February 5, 1903 – October 4, 1975) was an American heiress, businesswoman, philanthropist, patron of the arts and art collector, and a member of the prominent Whitney family. She co-founded, and was the majority owner of, Major League Baseball's New York Mets baseball franchise, making her the first woman to own a major league team in North America without inheriting it.

== Early life ==
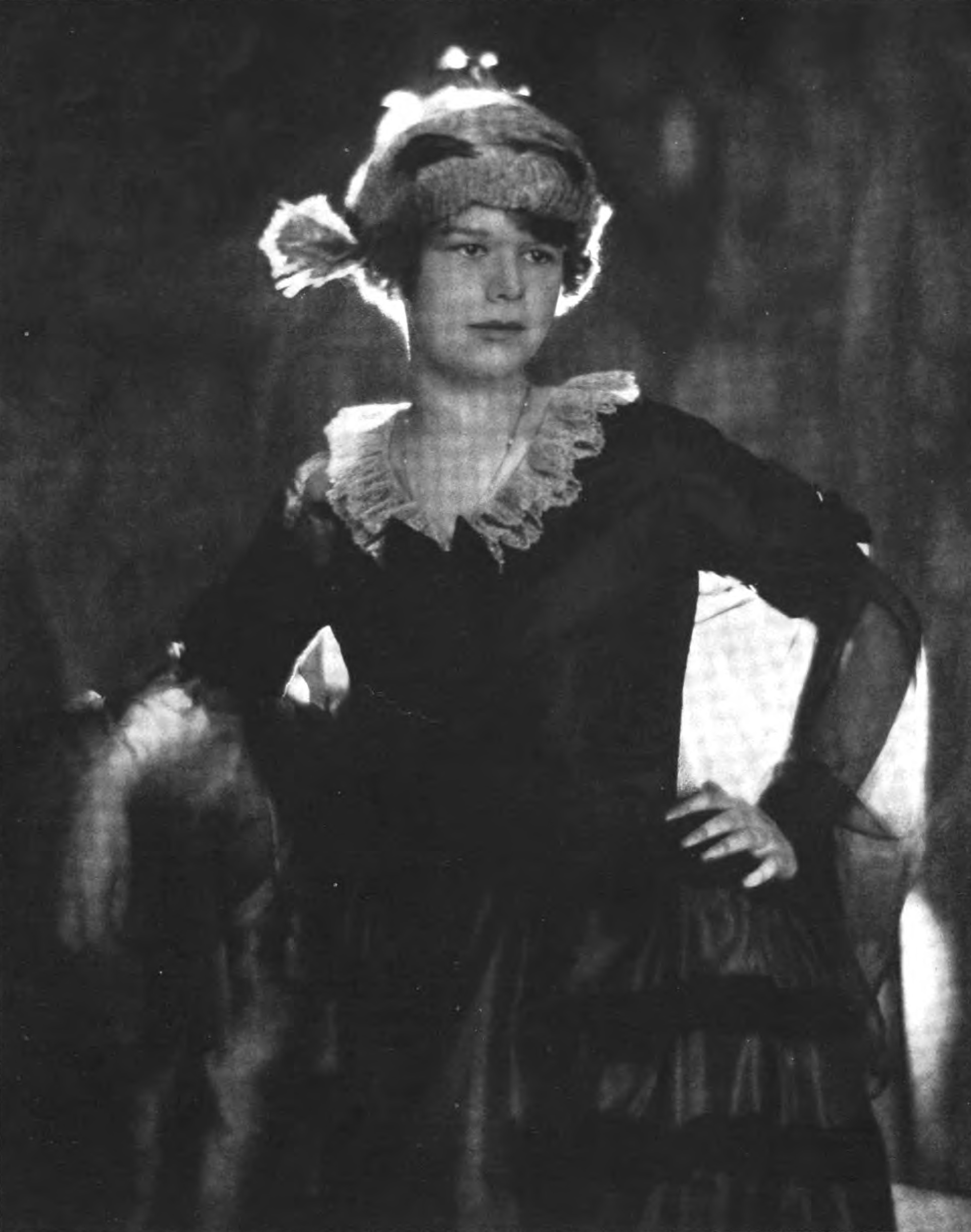
Joan Whitney, c. 1922

Joan Whitney was born in New York City, the daughter of William Payne Whitney and Helen Julia Hay. Her brother was John Hay Whitney. She inherited a trust fund from her grandfather, William C. Whitney and on her father's death in 1927, she received a large part of the family fortune. She attended Miss Chapin's School, then entered Barnard College with the class of 1925, as well as taking some courses at Brown.

== Career ==
=== New York Mets ===
Payson was a sports enthusiast who was a minority shareholder in the New York Giants Major League Baseball club. She and her husband opposed moving the team to San Francisco in 1957. After the majority of the shareholders approved the move, Mrs. Payson sold her stock and began working to get a replacement team for New York City. They teamed up with M. Donald Grant, who had represented the Paysons on the Giants board and had been the only board member to oppose the Giants' move, to win a New York franchise in the Continental League, a proposed third major league. The National League responded by awarding an expansion team to Payson's group, which became the New York Mets.

She served as the team's president from 1962 to 1975. Active in the affairs of the baseball club, she was much admired by the team's personnel and players. She was inducted posthumously into the New York Mets Hall of Fame in 1981. She was also the first woman to buy majority control of a team in a major North American sports league, rather than inheriting it.

Payson was instrumental in the return of Willie Mays to New York City baseball in May 1972 by way of trade and cash from the Giants.

=== Thoroughbred horse racing ===
Joan Whitney Payson also inherited her father and grandfather's love of thoroughbred horse racing, which ran throughout the Whitney family and created the famed Whitney Stakes. Following her father's death, her mother assumed management of his Greentree Stable, an equestrian estate and horse racing stable in Saratoga Springs, New York, and the Greentree breeding farm in Lexington, Kentucky. In 1932, her mother gave her a colt named Rose Cross whom she raced under the nom de course, Manhasset Stable. Rose Cross won the 1934 Dwyer Stakes and finished a good fifth in the Belmont Stakes.

In partnership with her brother, Joan Whitney Payson operated the highly successful Greentree stable, winning numerous important Graded stakes races including the Kentucky Derby twice, the Preakness Stakes once, and the Belmont Stakes four times. Payson and her husband owned an art-filled 50-room mansion at Greentree, the Whitney family estate in Manhasset, New York.

=== Art collection ===
An avid art collector, she purchased a variety of artwork but favored Impressionist and Post-Impressionist works with her collection containing watercolors, drawings, and paintings. She owned numerous pieces including those by James McNeill Whistler, Pierre-Auguste Renoir, Gustave Courbet, Maurice Prendergast, Jean Auguste Dominique Ingres, Honoré Daumier, Joshua Reynolds, Claude Monet, Henri Rousseau, Jan Provost, Édouard Manet, Lucas Cranach the Elder, Paul Cézanne, Henri Matisse, and Alfred Sisley and Vincent van Gogh. Payson was also a strong supporter of American artists, acquiring works by Thomas Eakins, Arthur B. Davies, Andrew Wyeth, Winslow Homer and John Singer Sargent. Payson donated significant works to the Metropolitan Museum of Art in New York City where the "Joan Whitney Payson Galleries" can be found.

The Joan Whitney Payson Collection is on permanent loan to the Portland Museum of Art in Portland, Maine and to Colby College in Waterville, Maine for one semester every two years. Regular educational tours of parts of the collection are offered to institutions throughout the United States.

In 1953, Payson co-founded The Country Art Gallery and Art School on Long Island with Clarissa Watson.

== Personal life ==
In 1924, she married Charles Shipman Payson (1898–1985), a lawyer and businessman who was a native of Maine and a graduate of Yale University and Harvard Law School. Together they had five children:

- Daniel Carroll Payson (1925–1945), was killed during the Battle of the Bulge.
- Sandra Helen Payson (1926–2004), who was married to William Meyer. They divorced and she later married George, Baron Weidenfeld (1919–2016).
- Payne Whitney Payson (1927–2023), who married Henry Bentivoglio Middleton, a direct descendant of Arthur Middleton, signer of the Declaration of Independence.
- Lorinda Payson (1930–2025), who married Vincent de Roulet (1925–1975)
- John Whitney Payson (1940–2016), who was married to Joanne D'Elia.

Joan Whitney Payson died in New York City, aged 72, after the 1975 baseball season. She is buried in the Pine Grove Cemetery, in Falmouth, Maine. Following her death, her daughter, Lorinda de Roulet, assumed the title of president of the New York Mets.

Her heirs sold their stock in the Mets in January 1980 as well as Greentree Farm. In 2005, the equestrian property in Saratoga Springs was put up for sale with an asking price of $19 million. In 1991, her son, John Whitney Payson, permanently installed the Joan Whitney Payson Collection in the Portland Museum of Art in Portland, Maine where the Charles Shipman Payson Building cornerstones the Museum and is home to seventeen paintings by Winslow Homer he donated.

Besides the Greentree estate in Manhasset, the family lived in an Italian Renaissance-palazzo style mansion in Manhattan later known as the Payne Whitney House. It was a wedding present from Joan's great uncle, Oliver Payne, her father's namesake, and designed by Stanford White. Located at 972 Fifth Avenue, it housed not just the family but 13 servants.

== See also ==
- Women in baseball
- List of female Major League Baseball principal owners

Business positions
Preceded by Bing Devine	President of the New York Mets; 1968–1975	Succeeded by Lorinda de Roulet
