= UBS Arena =

Multi-purpose indoor arena in Elmont, New York, U.S

- The Stable

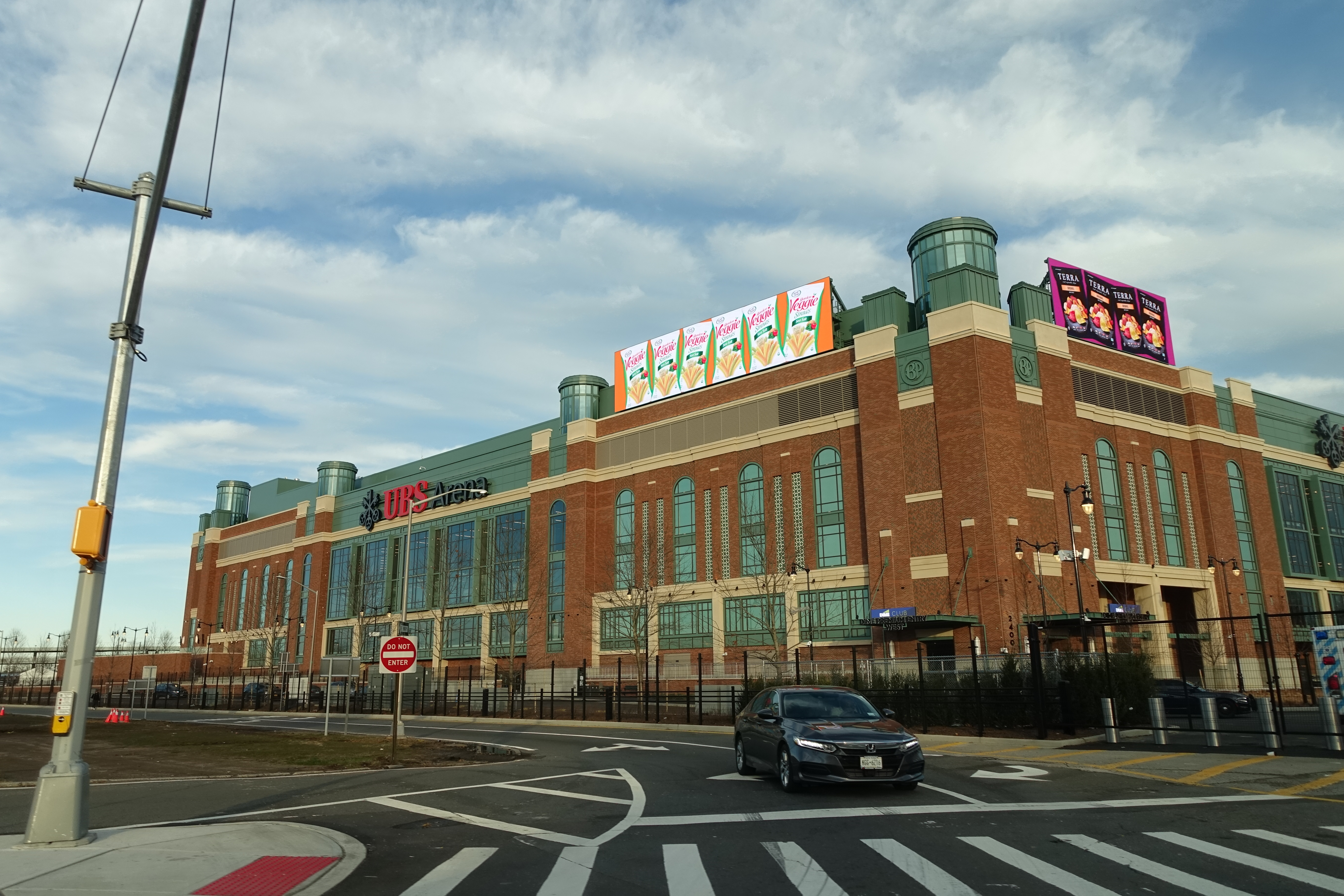
- UBS Arena in 2021

- Location near New York City Location within the State of New York Location within the United States
- Former names: Belmont Park Arena (planning/construction)
- Address: 2400 Hempstead Turnpike
- Location: Elmont, New York, U.S.
- Coordinates: 40.71179°N 73.72604°W
- Owner: New York Arena Partners (a joint venture of the New York Islanders, Oak View Group, and Sterling Equities)
- Operator: New York Islanders
- Capacity: Concerts: 19,000; Ice hockey: 17,255
- Type: Arena
- Surface: Concrete
- Scoreboard: Daktronics Inc.
- Public transit: Elmont–UBS Arena; New York City Bus: Q2, Q82; Nassau Inter-County Express: n1, n6

Construction
- Groundbreaking: September 23, 2019
- Built: 2019–2021
- Opened: November 20, 2021
- Cost: US$1 billion (including development)
- Architects: Populous; JRDV Urban International; Stantec
- Project manager: Populous
- Structural engineer: Populous
- Services engineer: Populous
- General contractor: Hunt / Barton Malow JV

Tenants
- New York Islanders (NHL) (2021–present); St. John's University men's and women's basketball (part-time) (2021–present); New York Sirens (PWHL) (2024); New York Mavericks (PBR) (2025–present)

Website
- ubsarena.com

UBS Arena is a multi-purpose indoor arena located in Elmont, New York, just outside New York City limits. Opened in 2021, it is the home of the New York Islanders of the National Hockey League (NHL), who previously played at the Nassau Coliseum and Barclays Center. The arena officially seats 17,250 people for ice hockey games and up to 19,000 for concerts and other select events. Fans and sports writers have affectionately nicknamed the arena "The Stable", due to the arena being located at Belmont Park, a famous thoroughbred racing venue.

== History ==
=== The Lighthouse Project and Barclays Center ===
By the mid-2000s, Nassau Coliseum was the fourth-oldest facility in the NHL, behind the twice-renovated Madison Square Garden in Manhattan (which remains in use today), the Pittsburgh Civic Arena (built in 1961 and replaced in 2010), and Northlands Coliseum in Edmonton (built in 1974, replaced in 2016). It was also the smallest arena in the league, until the Atlanta Thrashers moved to the smaller Canada Life Centre in Winnipeg and became the new Winnipeg Jets. Various attempts had been made to pursue a renovation or replacement of the aging facility, including the Lighthouse Project—a 2004 proposal to renovate the Coliseum and build a larger sport, entertainment, and residential district around it (including a minor-league ballpark and a 60-story high-rise from which the proposal derived its name). While Nassau County approved a version of the Lighthouse Project, the town of Hempstead never granted a change in zoning that was required for its construction, and the project was reported to have been cancelled.

In May 2010, Jeff Wilpon, then COO of Major League Baseball's New York Mets, had discussions with then-Islanders owner Charles Wang about constructing a new arena for the Islanders in the Willets Point neighborhood of Queens, adjacent to the Mets' ballpark, Citi Field. Wilpon also discussed the possibility of buying the Islanders.

In June 2010, FanHouse reported that Wilpon and his father, then-Mets owner Fred Wilpon, had begun working with real estate firm Jones Lang LaSalle (who also worked on the renovation of Madison Square Garden) on a feasibility study of a new Islanders arena in Queens. However, a source from Newsday indicated that the FanHouse report was not true. There were also reports that businessman Nelson Peltz wanted to buy the Islanders and move them to Barclays Center in Brooklyn.

On July 12, 2010, Hempstead supervisor Kate Murray announced an "alternate zone" created for the Coliseum property, downsizing the original Lighthouse Project to half its proposed size and making the project, according to then-Nassau County Executive Ed Mangano and the developers, "economically unviable for both the developer and owner of the site". From that point, the Lighthouse Project would no longer be pursued by Wang, Mangano and the developers.

In August 2011, Nassau County voters voted against a referendum that would have granted a $400 million public bond to construct a $350 million arena and $50 million minor league ballpark. The plan was presented by Wang as a last-ditch effort to keep the Islanders in Nassau County. In October 2012, the Islanders announced that they would re-locate to Barclays Center in Brooklyn once their lease of the Coliseum expired after the 2014–15 season. Meanwhile, a group led by Bruce Ratner (who had developed Barclays Center) secured an $89 million bid to renovate the Coliseum, aiming to host a minor hockey team as its main tenant, and have six Islanders games played there per season.

As Barclays Center was designed primarily as a basketball arena, its hockey configuration was criticized by fans for having seats with obstructed views, while its ice quality was criticized as substandard by players.

=== Arena deal, construction ===
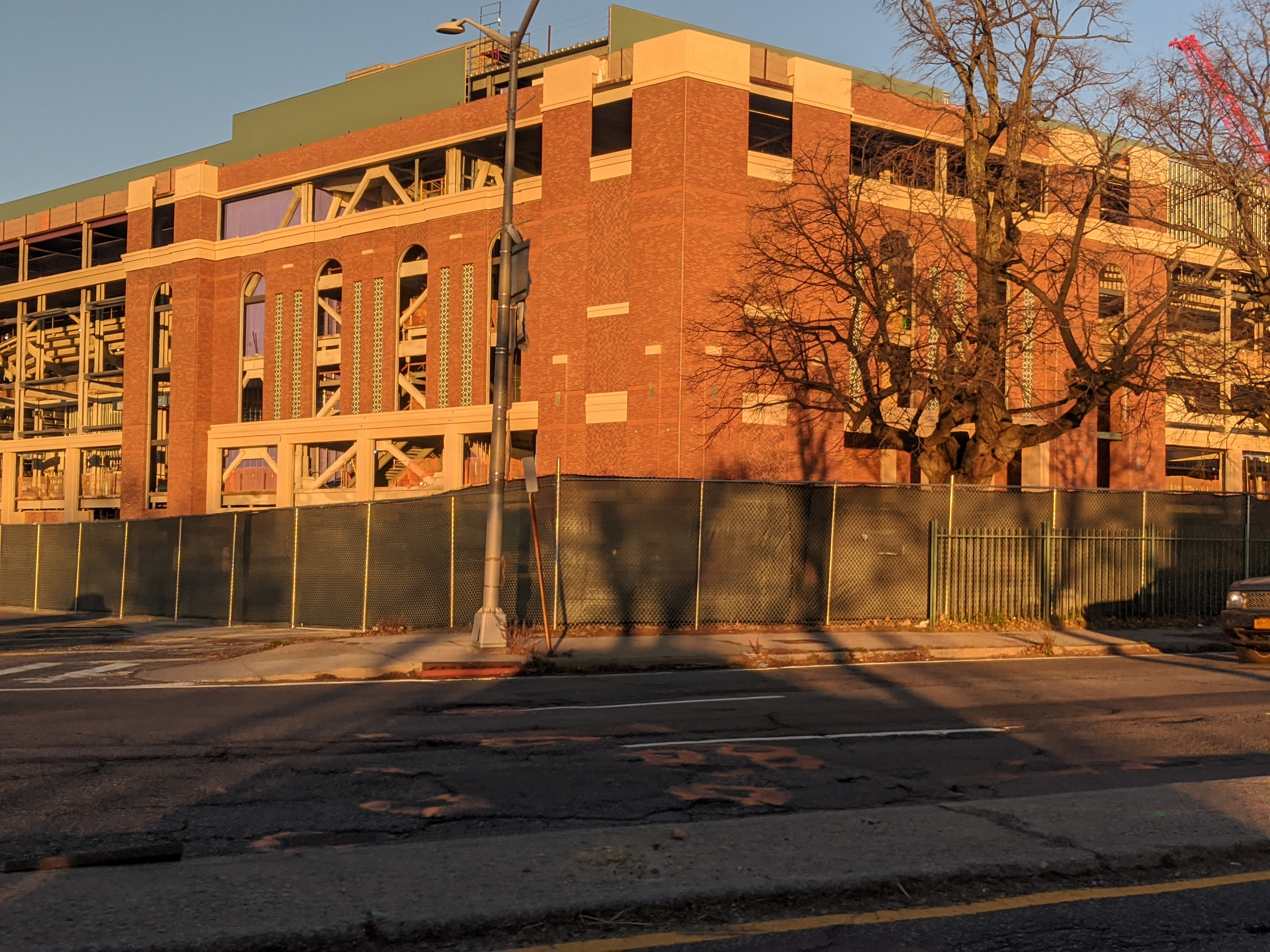
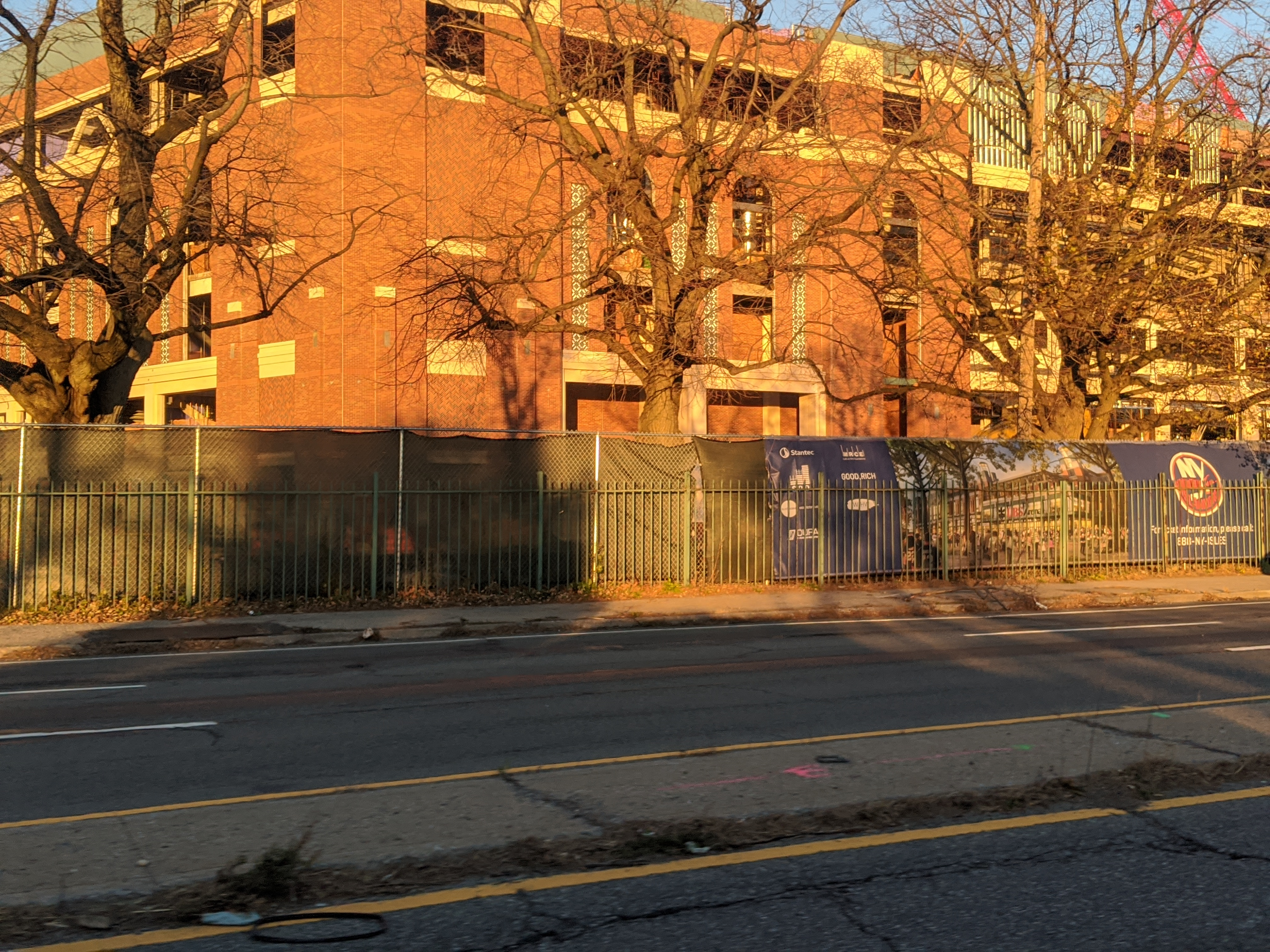
UBS Arena under construction (December 2020)

In December 2017, New York Arena Partners—a joint venture between the Islanders, Oak View Group, and Sterling Equities, won a bid to construct a new, 18,000-seat arena and mixed-use district at Belmont Park, beating a competing proposal by New York City FC for a new soccer stadium. The new arena was projected to be completed in time for the 2021–22 NHL season. In the meantime, the Islanders began to gradually play more home games at the Coliseum in the 2018–19 season.

On September 23, 2019, the groundbreaking for the arena was held. It was attended by New York state governor Andrew Cuomo, NHL commissioner Gary Bettman, and officials, alumni, and current players from the Islanders. In February 2020, it was announced that beginning with the 2020 playoffs, the Islanders would temporarily return to the Coliseum for all home games before moving to the Belmont Park arena for the 2021–22 season.

Due to the COVID-19 pandemic in New York, all non-essential construction projects in the state of New York were ordered to suspend operations beginning March 27, 2020. Construction was allowed to resume on May 27, 2020; team officials expected construction to finish in time for the Islanders to begin to play in October 2021, despite the two-month pause.

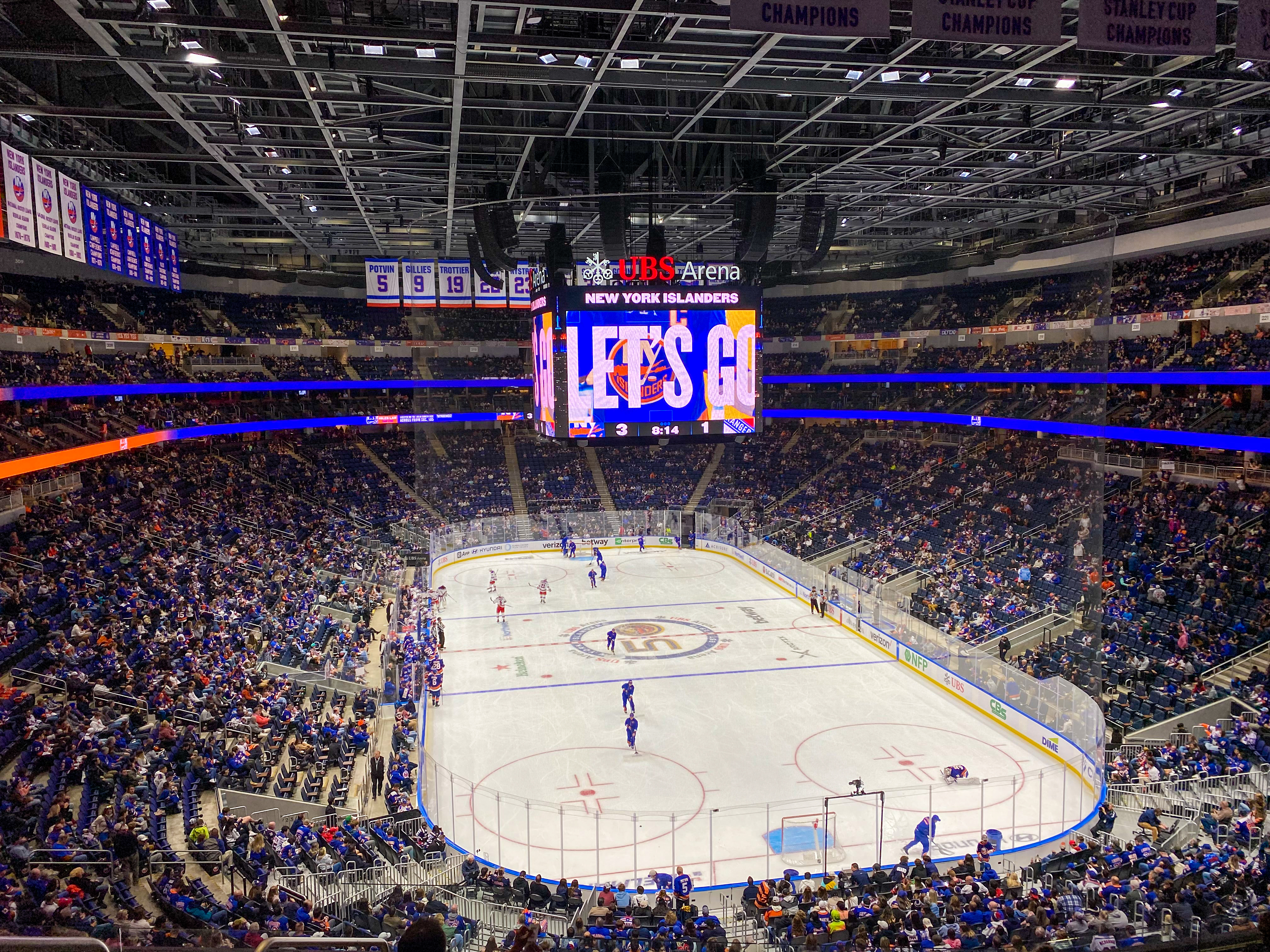
UBS Arena during an Islanders game (October 2022)

In July 2020, UBS was announced as the naming rights sponsor of the new arena under a 20-year deal, naming the facility UBS Arena.

=== Opening ===
The Islanders were to begin playing home games at UBS Arena for the 2021–22 season. To allow additional time for construction to complete, the Islanders' preseason home games were played at Webster Bank Arena in Bridgeport, Connecticut, home of their American Hockey League (AHL) affiliate, the Bridgeport Islanders. The team then played 13 consecutive road games to start the regular season. UBS Arena formally opened on November 19, 2021, with a private fundraising event featuring rock band Chicago.

== Social and economic footprint of construction ==
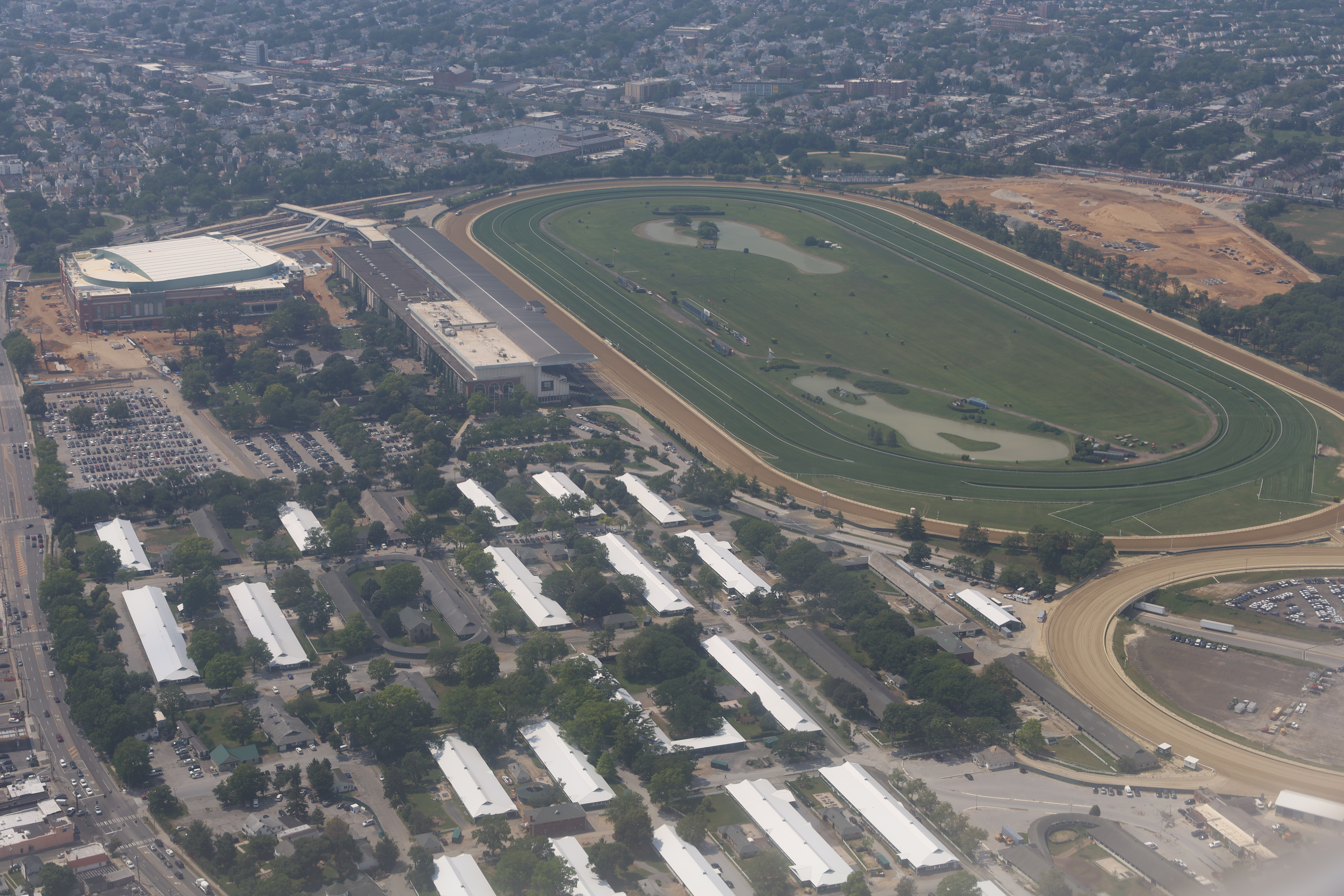
Belmont Park: UBS Arena (top left), west of the Belmont Park track (2021)

As the $1.5 billion project and surrounding redevelopment moved forward, it was announced that they would generate approximately $25 billion in economic activity, including major infrastructure improvements, 10,000 construction jobs, and 3,000 permanent jobs. This was seen as a boost to the regional economy at a time when activity had slowed due to the COVID-19 pandemic. The project partners set a goal of having 30 percent of contracting dollars for construction earmarked for state-certified minority and female-owned businesses, and a further 6 percent for service-disabled veteran-owned businesses. The project led to an additional $100 million investment in transit and infrastructure enhancements, including Elmont station, the first newly constructed Long Island Rail Road station in almost 50 years. It also included the development of Belmont Park Village, an open-air luxury outlet center.

== Notable events ==
=== Ice hockey ===
On November 20, 2021, the Islanders played their first game at UBS Arena, a 5–2 loss to the Calgary Flames. The Flames' Brad Richardson scored the arena's first goal, while Brock Nelson scored the first Islanders goal. The Islanders started 0–5–2 at UBS Arena. Their first home win at the venue came on December 11, in a 4–2 win against the New Jersey Devils.

The first Stanley Cup playoffs game at UBS Arena took place on April 21, 2023, when the Islanders defeated the Carolina Hurricanes by a score of 5–1. Casey Cizikas of the Islanders scored the first playoff goal in the arena.

UBS Arena was scheduled to host the 2026 NHL All-Star Game, having been awarded it during the 2024 NHL Stadium Series on February 18, 2024. However, the event was cancelled and instead replaced with a send-off event to the 2026 Winter Olympics at the arena instead that itself was cancelled in October 2025. The 2027 NHL All-Star Game will take place at UBS Arena.

The Professional Women's Hockey League's (PWHL) New York Sirens held six of its home games in the league's inaugural season at UBS Arena starting on January 10, 2024. For the 2024–25 season, the Sirens moved all of their home games to Prudential Center in Newark, NJ.

On March 1, 2025, Ilya Sorokin was credited with the first goalie goal in UBS Arena history at 19:48 of the third period when an errant pass from Steven Stamkos ended up in his own net, the final goal of a 7–4 Islanders win over the Nashville Predators. It was the 20th goalie goal in NHL history and the second goalie goal in Islanders franchise history.

On March 23, 2025, UBS Arena hosted an international match between the Jerusalem Capitals and HC Tel Aviv of the Israel Elite Hockey League. Jerusalem won 7–6 in overtime. This was the first time professional hockey teams from Israel competed in North America.

On April 6, 2025, Alexander Ovechkin of the Washington Capitals scored his NHL record-breaking 895th career goal at 7:26 of the second period against the Islanders, surpassing Wayne Gretzky's record of 894. However, the Islanders won the game, 4–1.

In April 2026, Long Island University (LIU) announced that a holiday college ice hockey tournament would be held at UBS Arena as part of a five-year partnership with the Islanders and the arena. The inaugural Empire State Holiday Invitational will be held over a two-day period in December 2026 and include the LIU Sharks and three other teams.

=== Basketball ===
The first college basketball game at UBS Arena was played on December 3, 2021, between the nearby St. John's Red Storm and the Kansas Jayhawks as part of the annual Big East–Big 12 Battle. The Jayhawks won the game 95–75. The Iona Gaels also hosted the Delaware Fightin' Blue Hens on December 21, 2021.

The New York Liberty of the Women's National Basketball Association (WNBA) moved its 2024 Commissioner's Cup championship game against the Minnesota Lynx to UBS Arena on June 25, as the Liberty's home arena of Barclays Center was set to host the 2024 NBA draft the following night.

=== Professional wrestling ===
The November 29, 2021 episode of WWE's Monday Night Raw took place at the arena. The December 8, 2021 episode of All Elite Wrestling's Dynamite took place at UBS Arena, as well as the taping for that week's episode of AEW Rampage, which aired on December 10. On June 30th 2024, All Elite Wrestling and New Japan Pro Wrestling co-hosted supershow Forbidden Door which aired live on PPV. On July 20, 2025, TNA Wrestling hosted Slammiversary from the arena.

=== Mixed martial arts ===
On July 16, 2022, the arena held its first MMA and UFC event, hosting UFC on ABC: Ortega vs. Rodríguez.

=== Concerts ===
British singer Harry Styles held the arena's first public concert on November 28, 2021. He also performed the entirety of his latest album Harry's House for the first time live on May 20, 2022.

The final concert by Aerosmith took place at UBS Arena on September 9, 2023 because the band canceled the remainder of their farewell tour when singer Steven Tyler suffered a fractured larynx.

=== Bull riding ===
In 2025, UBS Arena will be the new home venue of the New York Mavericks; one of ten bull riding teams of the Professional Bull Riders (PBR) Team Series held in the summer and autumn. Each team has their own hometown event. There are also two "neutral site" events during the season, which culminates at T-Mobile Arena in Las Vegas, Nevada, in October to determine the PBR Team Series Champion.

During their first year in 2024, the New York Mavericks had Barclays Center in Brooklyn as their home venue.

=== Other events ===
Both the 2024 and 2025 MTV Video Music Awards were held at the UBS Arena.

== See also ==
- List of indoor arenas by capacity

Preceded by Nassau Coliseum	Home of the New York Islanders; 2021–present	Succeeded by current
