= The Lighthouse Project =

- The official logo for the Lighthouse at Long Island project

General information
- Type: Mixed use
- Location: Uniondale, New York
- Estimated completion: cancelled

The Lighthouse Project, officially named The Lighthouse at Long Island, was a proposed transformation of the Nassau Veterans Memorial Coliseum and the area surrounding it into a modern suburban area. The project was first introduced by New York Islanders owner Charles Wang. The base of the project was a newly renovated Coliseum for the New York Islanders to play in. Surrounding the Coliseum would be houses, offices, restaurants, and various stores, as well as Long Island's first five-star hotel. There would also be an athletic complex, conference and exhibition facilities, and a minor league baseball ballpark.

The Lighthouse Project was expected to take 8 to 10 years to be completed, and to cost about $3.74 billion. The investors expected the project to generate $71 million of annual tax revenues, and create about 75,000 construction and construction-related jobs. After the project's completion, 19,000 new permanent jobs were expected to be created. Wang, who stated his regret at buying the team in 2009, assumed that the Coliseum would either be refurbished or replaced over time, but instead the project suffered delays.

Nassau County residents voted against building a new arena for the Islanders on August 1, 2011.

== Proposal ==
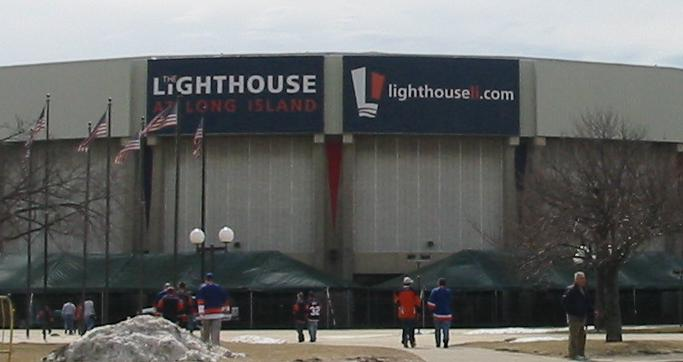
Banners displayed along the outside of Nassau Veterans Memorial Coliseum in 2009, promoting the Lighthouse Project

The Nassau Veterans Memorial Coliseum was currently the second-oldest arena in active use by an NHL team (after Madison Square Garden), and had the second smallest capacity of all arenas in the NHL (after MTS Centre). Nassau County asked for and received proposals from different development groups regarding how to renovate and build up the coliseum and surrounding area. Islanders owner Charles Wang proposed a plan to develop the area surrounding the arena; his plan originally included a renovation of the Coliseum, a 60-story tower designed to look like a lighthouse, housing, athletic facilities, a new minor league baseball stadium, restaurants, and a new hotel, at a projected overall cost of approximately $200 million. On August 14, 2007, Charles Wang and the Lighthouse Development Group, partnered with Rexcorp, created a new plan downsizing the entire project. The Coliseum design changed considerably, and the 60 story "Lighthouse" was replaced with two 30-story buildings connected by a footbridge.

== 2009–17 ==
In February 2009, local media speculated that Charles Wang, frustrated with the slow pace of obtaining approval for the project from the Town of Hempstead, would consider relocating the team. The team would become eligible to move when its lease with Nassau County ends in 2015. The Islanders played a 2009 preseason game in Kansas City, Missouri, which was considered a possible candidate for relocation. There was also a movement to have the Islanders play adjacent to Citi Field, the home ballpark of the New York Mets baseball team, in the Willets Point section of Queens should the team leave Nassau County. Wang had said that he wanted the team to remain where it is, but also said that he would be forced to explore other options if significant steps were not made by the Town of Hempstead in regard to approving the project by October 2009. Local newspapers such as Newsday and the Daily News speculated that Wang would consider moving the team to an area such as Queens or Brooklyn, where Barclays Center was then being built for the New Jersey Nets basketball team. Financing documents for the arena released in December 2009 indicated that “The New York Islanders could potentially become a tenant” at the Barclays Center. The Islanders' agreement with the New York Rangers allows them to relocate anywhere on Long Island, including Brooklyn and Queens.

In May 2009, Newsday reported that Wang had subsidized the team by $208.8 million, an average of $23 million per year since buying it, beyond what he paid for it.

After the October 2009 deadline passed, the Long Island Press reported the cancellation of the Lighthouse Project. Wang has denied the report.

In May 2010, Mets COO Jeff Wilpon had discussions with Wang about constructing a new arena for the Islanders near Citi Field. Wilpon has also discussed the possibility of buying the Islanders. In June 2010, the website FanHouse reported that Jeff and Fred Wilpon, the owner of the Mets, began working with real estate firm Jones Lang LaSalle (who also worked on the renovation of Madison Square Garden) on a feasibility study of a new Islanders arena in Queens. However, a source from Newsday indicated that the FanHouse report was not true. There were also reports that businessman Nelson Peltz wanted to buy the Islanders and move them to the Barclays Center in Brooklyn.

On July 12, 2010, Town Supervisor Kate Murray (R-Hempstead) announced an “alternate zone” created for the Nassau Veterans Memorial Coliseum property, downsizing the original Lighthouse Project to half its proposed size and making the project, according to Nassau County Executive Ed Mangano and the developers, "economically unviable for both the developer and owner of the site." From this point, the Lighthouse Project would no longer be pursued by Wang, Mangano and the developers.

On May 11, 2011, the Islanders and Nassau County executives announced that county residents would vote on a referendum for taxpayer funding for a new arena for the New York Islanders on August 1; on that date, county voters rejected a proposal for a new arena to replace the Nassau Coliseum.

On October 24, 2012, it was formally announced that the New York Islanders would be moving to Barclays Center in Brooklyn following the expiration of their lease after the 2014–2015 season.

In 2017, a group led by the Islanders reached a deal to construct a new 18,000-seat arena at Belmont Park. and split their schedule between Barclays Center and a recently renovated Nassau Coliseum on an interim basis until the completion of their new home, UBS Arena, in November 2021.
