= Wilpon =

Wilpon is a surname. Notable people with the surname include:

- Fred Wilpon (born 1936), real estate developer, baseball executive, and team owner
- Jeff Wilpon (born 1961), baseball executive, financial executive, and museum director, son of Fred

== See also ==
- Wilson (name)
