= SFCG =

SFCG may refer to:

- Search for Common Ground, an international organization to end conflict and build safe societies
- SFCG Co., a money-lending company in Japan
