= Puppy Bowl =

- Logo used from 2005–2018
- Genre: Homage to sports television
- Narrated by: Harry Kalas; Jeff Bordner; Scott Graham; Steve Levy
- Country of origin: United States
- Original language: English

Production
- Executive producer: Melinda Toporoff
- Running time: 180 minutes (2005–08, 2021–present); 120 minutes (2008–2020)

Original release
- Network: Animal Planet
- Release: February 6, 2005 – present

The Puppy Bowl is an annual television program on Animal Planet that mimics an American football game similar to the Super Bowl using puppies. Shown each year on Super Bowl Sunday, the show consists of footage of a batch of puppies at play inside a model stadium, with commentary on their actions. The first Puppy Bowl was shown on February 6, 2005, opposite to Super Bowl XXXIX. The puppies featured in the Puppy Bowl are from shelters. The program is designed to raise awareness about adopting pets from shelters and rescuing abandoned animals.

== Production ==
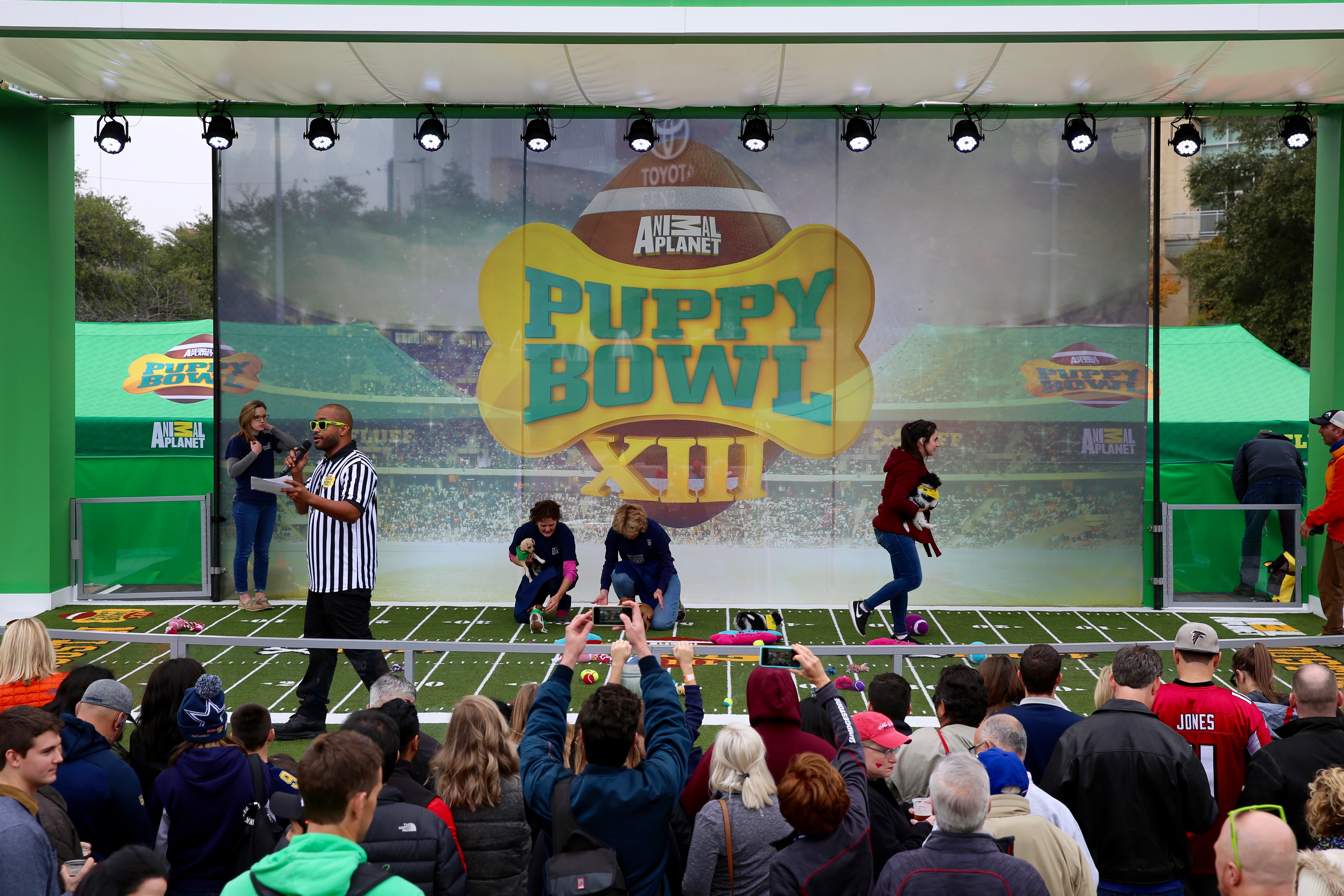
Puppy Bowl XIII in 2017

According to the show's producers, the inspiration for Puppy Bowl as Super Bowl counterprogramming came from the popular Yule Log Christmas program.

Several months of planning occur before each show, which is usually shot in October. A veterinarian is on site during the production of Puppy Bowl to ensure animal safety and well-being, and to administer any veterinary medical care which might be needed. Representatives from humane organizations, as well as the shelters which lend their animals to the production, are also on-site as observers to ensure animal welfare standards are maintained. In 2012, an American Humane Association representative was always on-site to ensure that puppies did not become too aggressive and injure one another.

According to its associate producer, about 53 hours of videoing are needed to produce a single Puppy Bowl. In 2007, shooting occurred over three days. Roughly 30 staff members were needed in 2008 to produce the show. In 2010, the veterinarian on site said shooting was spread over three days, while in 2015 the videoing occurred in 12-hour blocks over two days. Puppies are given a rest period every 30 minutes, due to the heat from the lights. Forty-six puppies were used in 2008, and about 60 puppies in 2010. The 2011 production occurred in the New York City area in the fall of 2010, using 47 puppies, while the 2012 show featured 58 puppies. The 2013 show (shot at a television studio in west midtown in Manhattan) featured 63 puppies, with 10 on the field at one time. Shooting occurred over two days. The 2014 episode was videoed October 2 to 4, 2013, at the Chelsea Broadcast Center in Manhattan, New York City. A staff of 49 Animal Planet employees and 48 volunteers wrangled the animals, with each puppy assigned a single human overseer. Cats were shot the first day, dogs the second, and other animals on the fourth. A total of 66 puppies were used for the show in 2014, including a basset hound with a genetic defect to its paw. This allowed 12 to 15 puppies to be on the field at a time, and for puppies to be given rest periods every 20 minutes. Another 30 untrained kittens, five penguins, three trained adult cats, eight "tailgate party" dogs, four police dogs, and six hamsters were used in the 2014 show. All the animals except the penguins (which were provided by the Columbus Zoo and Aquarium) are adoptable. In 2015, 37 shelters from around the United States and Puerto Rico submitted 85 puppies for the event, of which 55 puppies were chosen to be on the air. Another 25 kittens were used for the half-time show. Forty-four shelters and rescue groups in 25 states provided 49 animals in 2016. (Eighty-eight animals "auditioned".) Videoing returned to an eight-hour-a-day, three-day format in 2016, with two days used for videoing puppies and one day for kittens and other animals. Sixty personnel were needed for shooting. Puppies were grouped by size (small, medium, and large) for on-field play. For Puppy Bowl XIII, 34 shelters and rescue organizations in 22 states and Puerto Rico provided the 78 puppies featured on the show.

Puppy Bowl is shot inside a miniature Plexiglas "stadium" that is 19 feet (5.8 m) long by 10 feet (3.0 m) wide. Only puppies between 12 and 21 weeks old are allowed on the show, and there is a height and weight limit due to the size limitations of the play area. Puppies must show that they are well-socialized with people and with other puppies, and that they have the full range of vaccinations. A wide variety of toys are placed inside the "stadium.” Although there is no minimum or maximum limit on how many toys may be in the stadium, show producers say that toys which make the loudest noise or which are sausage-shaped get the most attention. Toys are usually switched out every 20 minutes, and often more frequently. Peanut butter is smeared around camera lenses to induce the puppies to lick the camera. About 80 ounces (2,300 g) of peanut butter are used for the taping, along with 15 pounds (6.8 kg) of dry dog food, 500 dog treats, and 250 toys.

The various cameras used to tape the show generated about 50 hours of footage in 2011, but more than 90 hours in 2012 (for the 2013 airing). Some cameras are placed inside toys, to give a puppy's-eye view of the action. In 2015, 18 cameras were used, and several weeks were needed to edit the footage into a two-hour program. Fifteen cameras were used in 2016, and more than 100 hours of footage generated for the 2017 show.

The first five Puppy Bowls were narrated by Harry Kalas, a narrator for NFL Films and longtime play-by-play voice of the Philadelphia Phillies. The Puppy Bowls from 2010 to 2011 were narrated by Jeff Bordner and then by Scott Graham from 2012 until 2020.

== Format ==
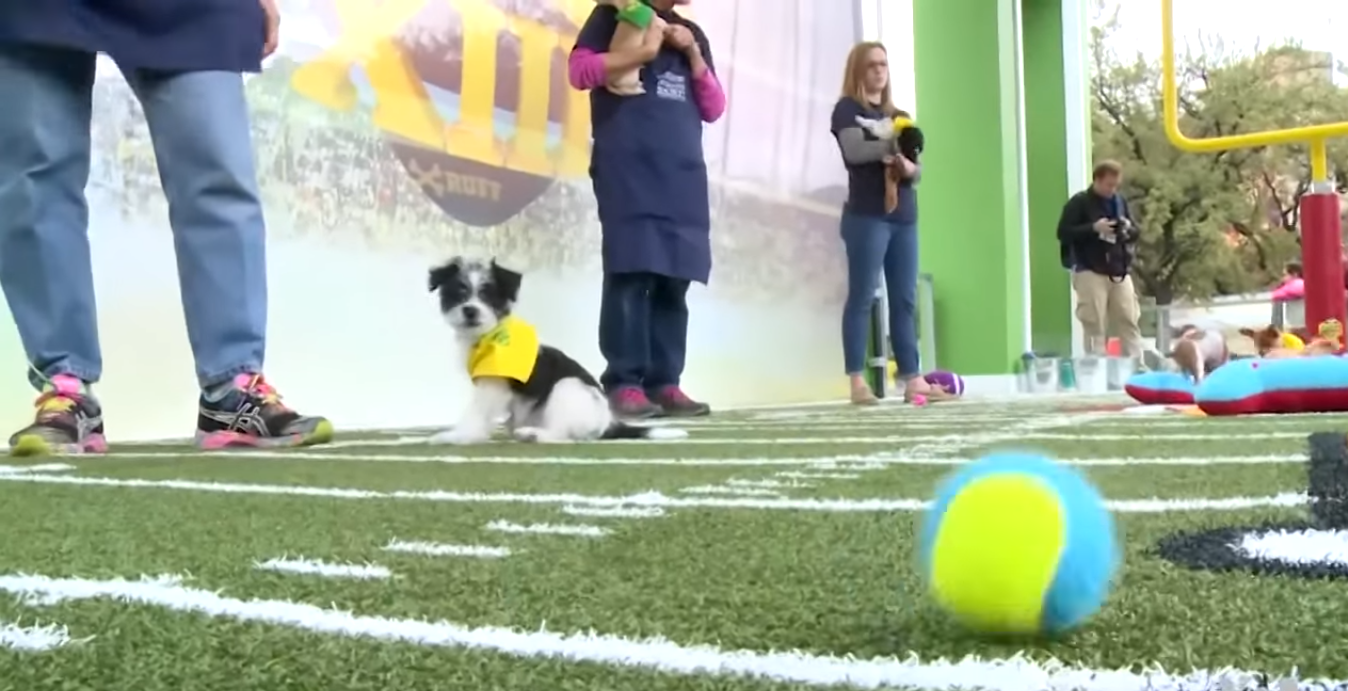
A puppy participating at Puppy Bowl XIII inside the miniature stadium

The Puppy Bowl consists of a number of puppies playing in a model stadium (the stadium changes names each year depending on the sponsorship) with no audience (but with canned audience cheering), commentary, and instant replay shots. A "bowl cam" provides shots upwards through the transparent bottom of a special water bowl built into the stadium floor, with a wide-angle lens that allows viewers to watch the puppies drink water (and walk through it) up close. Ten full-size digital cameras and five GoPro miniature digital cameras were used in 2014 to capture the action. These numbers include the hidden cameras in the water bowl and toys.

A human "rufferee" watches over the "action on the field." In the first few years of Puppy Bowl, this was a crew member randomly selected each year. Beginning in 2008, it was Animal Planet associate producer Andrew Schechter. For the 2012 Puppy Bowl, Schechter was replaced by SportsNet New York and Beer Money! host Dan Schachner, who has hosted the show ever since. He auditioned by submitting a tape showing him trying to organize a dog football game among unwitting dog-owners at a public park. Football terminology is often used by the announcer and referee to illustrate the puppies' behavior and actions. To score a touchdown, a puppy must carry any of the many toys on the field (typically via the mouth) into either of the two end zones. To score a field goal, a puppy must kick a toy into either of the two end zones. Starting in Puppy Bowl XI, 7 points are awarded to the team whose puppy scored a touchdown and 3 points are awarded to the team whose puppy scored a field goal. Touchdowns happen more often than field goals. Occasionally, a "double touchdown" may occur when a puppy races with a toy from one end zone to the other. In 2016, a "team touchdown" occurred as two puppies carried the same toy into the end zone.

"Penalties" are issued for puppies relieving themselves on the field. Timeouts are called if the water bowl needs to be refilled, or if the puppies begin to fight (a behavior called "unnecessary rrruff-ness"). The show uses puns to mimic the rules of professional football, including paws interference (pass interference), ruff sides (offsides), and dog-collar tackle (horse-collar tackle). Unique "penalties" called may also include howling, illegal bathing (playing in the water bowl), napping on the field, premature watering of the lawn (urination), "excessive fertilization" (defecation), "neutral bone infraction" (neutral zone infraction), and "ineligible retriever downfield" (ineligible receiver downfield). Three special "penalty calls" were introduced in 2015: "Terrorizing the ref" (for a puppy who acts aggressively toward the referee), "paws interference" (for when a puppy blocks another) and "pancaking" (for when a tired puppy sprawls on the floor instead of playing). Penalties, however, do not disadvantage the offender.

Each year, a Most Valuable Puppy (or MVP) is chosen at the end of the show for the puppy considered to be the stand-out performer of the event. Beginning with Puppy Bowl XI, viewers were allowed to vote for the MVP. MVP voting was permitted for the program's airing.

Although puppies may urinate or defecate on the field as frequently as once every 20 seconds, all but one of the incidents is edited out of the show. In 2016, 315 plastic bags were needed to retrieve feces, and more than 1,500 absorbent pads used to clean up urination. Puppies occasionally engage in sexual activity, but this is edited out of the program.

The running time of Puppy Bowls I through IV was 180 minutes (including commercials). The running time of Puppy Bowl V was decreased to 120 minutes (including commercials). Jessie Dinh, producer at Discovery Studios, explained the reason for the decrease: "We only did two hours this year so that we had the opportunity to include some other fun elements."

=== Team Ruff vs. Team Fluff ===
2015's Puppy Bowl XI introduced team-based competition to Puppy Bowl for the first time. Puppies were divided into two teams, Teams "Ruff" and "Fluff,” each identifiable by a different colored bandana worn throughout the event. Points were tallied on a scoreboard powered by a hamster running on a wheel. The team with the most points was declared the victor. Team Ruff overwhelmed their opponents 87–49 to become the first-ever Puppy Bowl champions.

In Puppy Bowl XII, Team Ruff won again by a score of 70–44.

In Puppy Bowl XIII, Team Fluff upset the heavily favored Team Ruff by a score of 93–38.

In Puppy Bowl XIV, Team Fluff won again in a close margin of 52–47.

In Puppy Bowl XV, Team Ruff overturned Team Fluff's winning streak by a score of 59–51.

In Puppy Bowl XVI, Team Fluff returned to winning by a score of 63–59.

In Puppy Bowl XVII, Team Ruff's incredible fourth quarter comeback gave them the win by a score of 73–69. Most Valuable Puppy Marshall scored a double touchdown.

In Puppy Bowl XVIII, Team Fluff won on a game-winning touchdown when time expired, which gave Team Fluff a 73–69 win.

In Puppy Bowl XIX, Team Fluff won with a score of 87–83. the game winning touchdown was scored by Vivianne the Siberian Husky/Rottweiler/Neapolitan Mastiff mix.

In Puppy Bowl XX, Team Ruff won with a score of 72–69. The winning field goal was by Cookie.

In Puppy Bowl XXI, Team Ruff was winning for most of the end until a last second turnaround made Team Fluff the champion winning 68–66.

Team Fluff currently leads the series 6–5 as of 2026.

Like the Super Bowl itself, one can bet on which team they think will win. On top of that, there are many other fun prop bets designed to be low risk, as sportsbooks limit bets to a few hundred dollars at most. The airing of the show is not live, though, so bettors must get their action in before it starts on Super Bowl Sunday.

=== Kitty Half-Time Show ===
Starting with Puppy Bowl II, at the 1 hour, 15 minute mark, the puppies leave the field and a large scratching post is brought out with a wide variety of kittens for the Kitty Half-Time Show. This features kittens playing for 30 minutes with lights, laser pointers, balls of yarn, a scratching post, flint sweepers, and a wide variety of other toys. The grand finale of the Puppy Bowl II Half-Time Show was a confetti blast that sent most of the cats running away scared. Puppy Bowl III did not show the cats' departure from the field. The halftime show of Puppy Bowl IV in 2008 was only 15 minutes in length. In 2012, Animal Planet said that 20 kittens would be part of the Kitty Half-Time Show. This number increased to 21 for the 2013 airing. All the kittens are also animals from shelters, and are adoptable.

The "stadium" is outfitted with a variety of scratching posts and toys that move to interest the kittens and encourage them to move about. This does not usually work, however, and catnip is distributed over the set to help the kittens be more active and interested in their surroundings.

=== Other features ===
In 2009, a model blimp (supposedly floating over the Puppy Bowl) was added. The "blimp" mimics the appearance of the Goodyear Blimp over many outdoor football events. Shots of the puppies at play were green-screened into the windows to make it appear as if the "blimp" was actually hovering over the field. Inside the model of the blimp's control room, hamsters are allowed to play (as if they were the crew of the blimp). The blimp returned in 2010, 2011, 2012, 2013, 2014, 2018, 2019, and 2020.

Beginning in 2010, "bunny cheerleaders" (rabbits) were shown, as if these animals were on the sidelines. In 2011, the "bunny cheerleaders" were replaced by "chicken cheerleaders" (hens and roosters). The bunnies and chickens were replaced by five pigs in a "Piggy Pep Squad" in 2012. Hedgehog cheerleaders were introduced for 2013, and replaced with penguins in 2014.

Also beginning in 2010, the American Animal Hospital Association (AAHA) began sponsoring the Puppy Bowl. A veterinarian was shown giving each puppy a physical prior to participation, provided care to any animal which might appear injured, and provided tips to viewers about proper animal care. Dr. Elisa Mazzaferro, Director of Emergency Services at Wheat Ridge Animal Hospital in Denver, Colorado, provided the official on-camera care for the puppies and other animals.

A new element for 2011 was a parody of the popular "Kiss Cam" used at sporting events. The "Kiss Cam" returned from 2012 through 2020.

Two other new elements were added in 2012: a cockatiel named Meep "tweeted" about the game from the sidelines (using the Twitter social media network), and Jill Rappaport, a TV reporter and animal advocate, provided color commentary.

The hamsters in the blimp and Meep the "tweeting" cockatiel were retained for the 2013 show, but the piglet cheerleaders were replaced by baby hedgehogs in tutus. Owners of hedgehogs volunteered the use of their animals for the show. The tutus, however, did not stay on the animals. A new "Puppy Cam" (a miniature wide camera attached to a puppy's collar) was added in place of the "Kiss Cam,” to provide viewers with a puppy's-eye-view of the action. A new feature in the 2013 game is the "Cute Cam," the slow-mo camera. Additionally, the human "stars" of Animal Planet's reality TV shows were added in 2013 as commentators. Another addition is a "special puppy hot tub" (a large pan of water) in which puppies will relax prior to or after their time on the field.

For the 2014 edition of the Puppy Bowl, the tenth anniversary of the show, First Lady Michelle Obama opened the show with footage of puppies being "trained" for the Puppy Bowl on the South Lawn of the White House. Police dogs appeared on the field when the national anthem was played. Returning as the official "tweeter" of the show was Meep the cockatiel. The dwarf cat Lil Bub was added as a "commentator" broadcasting from a Chicago studio. In reference to the Super Bowl's halftime show with Bruno Mars, Keyboard Cat "played" his song "Locked Out of Heaven" during the halftime show. The half-time show also featured 30 kittens toppling dominoes and a kitten "parachuting" onto the field. To increase interactivity with fans of the show, the Puppy Bowl X online site allowed fans to play a "Fantasy Puppy League" (similar to fantasy football) featuring the 2014 puppies, gave fans the chance to vote for the "Most Valuable Puppy" during the event, and gave viewers the opportunity to post photos of their own animals and Puppy Bowl parties via Instagram. Entertainment Weekly reporter James Hibbered commented on the changes by noting, "Animal Planet is simply embracing viral-video favorites and ratcheting up the sports-spoof silliness to a new level this year."

Animal Planet hosted a "Puppy Bowl Experience" at the Discovery Times Square exhibition space in New York City, which included a 15,000 square feet (1,400 m^{2}) area where people could play with puppies, a recreation of the Puppy Bowl set, and advertising sponsor areas. The event was an homage to the NFL Experience (now Super Bowl Experience), a fan attraction hosted.in the Super Bowl's host city prior to the game. Super Bowl XLVIII was hosted in East Rutherford, New Jersey that year, but the NFL elected to host an outdoor festival along Broadway and Times Square rather than the usual indoor event.

An emphasis on adopting pets from shelters became a focus of the show in 2014 as well. A total of 33 shelters from 18 states and the territory of Puerto Rico supplied shelter animals (dogs, cats, hamsters, etc.) for the Puppy Bowl. All the animals on the show (except for the penguins) are shelter animals, and usually all are adopted by the time the show airs. Throughout the program, updates on the status of each of the adopted puppies was given. Throughout the program, however, the adoption journey of Rosie (now named Scout), a three-month-old Chihuahua/terrier mix, was followed from her arrival at the shelter to her life with her new family.

Puppy Bowl XI featured five Nigerian dwarf goats as cheerleaders. "Katty Furry,” a cat depicted playing Katy Perry songs in YouTube videos, was the "half-time performer. MVPs were chosen in each of the program's first three airings. Puppies were divided for the first time into teams, and a hamster-powered scoreboard kept score. Celebrities such as Andy Cohen, Whitney Cummings, and Reese Witherspoon appeared on the program to root for "their team,” and an animated short featuring The Simpsons played during the show. Animals with substantial followings on Instagram had images submitted, showing their support for each team as well. A fantasy football draft was introduced to allow fans to pick the puppy they felt would score the most points.

Puppy Bowl XII was preceded by "Road to the Puppy Bowl" events across the United States in fall and winter 2015. Local animal shelters and rescue groups partnered with Animal Planet on these events, during which thousands of animals were adopted. Turbo the tortoise suffered a wardrobe malfunction (inspired by the Super Bowl XXXVIII halftime show controversy) during the half-time entertainment. Silkie chickens served as cheerleaders, and a skunk helped referee the show.

The 2017 Puppy Bowl XIII featured three special-needs dogs: Doobert, who is deaf; Lucky, who had her right front leg amputated; and Winston, who is both sight- and hearing-impaired. An hour-long "pre-game show,” scheduled to air an hour prior to the Puppy Bowl, and a "Puppy Bowl Virtual Reality" feature (the game seen through the eyes of a puppy), were also added. Halftime entertainment featured "Kitty Gaga" and the Chicago Rock Cats. Guinea pigs and rabbits were the 2017 cheerleaders, and famous pets of Instagram returned. For the first time, Team Ruff and Team Fluff competed for the fictional "Lombarky Trophy" (a parody of the Lombardi Trophy), and each team had a mascot (a rescued screech owl for Team Ruff, and a rescued chinchilla for Team Fluff).

In Puppy Bowl XVII, there were puppy “cheerleaders” for both teams on their respective sidelines. In Puppy Bowl XVI, the cheerleaders were armadillos for Ruff and goats for Fluff.

== Puppy Bowl results ==
No.	Puppy Bowl	Most Valuable Puppy	Winning Team	Score
1	Puppy Bowl I	Max, a Jack Russell Terrier	No Winner	N/A
2	Puppy Bowl II	Monseigneur Jacques, a French poodle	No Winner	N/A
3	Puppy Bowl III	Bomber, a Samoyed	No Winner	N/A
4	Puppy Bowl IV	Abigail, a Jack Russell Terrier	No Winner	N/A
5	Puppy Bowl V	Matilda, a Beagle	No Winner	N/A
6	Puppy Bowl VI	Jake, a Chihuahua/Pug Mix	No Winner	N/A
7	Puppy Bowl VII	CB, a Shih Tzu/Terrier Mix	No Winner	N/A
8	Puppy Bowl VIII	Fumble, a Terrier Mix	No Winner	N/A
9	Puppy Bowl IX	Fitz, a Catahoula Mix	No Winner	N/A
10	Puppy Bowl X	Loren, a Brittany	No Winner	N/A
11	Puppy Bowl XI	Henry, a Lab Mix	Team Ruff	87–49
12	Puppy Bowl XII	Star, a Chow Chow Mix	Team Ruff	70–44
13	Puppy Bowl XIII	Rory, a poodle mix	Team Fluff	93–38
14	Puppy Bowl XIV	Bear, a Pit Bull/Foxhound Mix	Team Fluff	52–47
15	Puppy Bowl XV	Bumble, a Lab/Chow Chow Mix	Team Ruff	59–51
16	Puppy Bowl XVI	Gina, a Lab/Chow Chow Mix	Team Fluff	63–59
17	Puppy Bowl XVII	Marshall, a Boston Terrier	Team Ruff	73–69
18	Puppy Bowl XVIII	Kirby, a Labrador	Team Fluff	73–69
19	Puppy Bowl XIX	Pickle, a Pomeranian/Papillon Mix	Team Fluff	87–83 (OT)
20	Puppy Bowl XX	Moosh, an Australian Shepherd Mix	Team Ruff	72–69
21	Puppy Bowl XXI	Foxtrot, a Border Collie	Team Fluff	68–66
22	Puppy Bowl XXII	Boba, an Australian Cattle Dog Mix	Team Fluff	73–69
23	Puppy Bowl XXIII	TBA	TBA	TBA

== Episodes ==
No.	Puppy Bowl	Original release date	US viewers (millions)
1	Puppy Bowl I	February 6, 2005	5.58
2	Puppy Bowl II	February 5, 2006	7.0
3	Puppy Bowl III	February 4, 2007	7.5
4	Puppy Bowl IV	February 3, 2008	8.5
5	Puppy Bowl V	February 1, 2009	1.152
6	Puppy Bowl VI	February 7, 2010	1.1
7	Puppy Bowl VII	February 6, 2011	1.7
8	Puppy Bowl VIII	February 5, 2012	1.6
9	Puppy Bowl IX	February 3, 2013	2.631
10	Puppy Bowl X	February 2, 2014	3.254
11	Puppy Bowl XI	February 1, 2015	2.767
12	Puppy Bowl XII	February 7, 2016	2.198
13	Puppy Bowl XIII	February 5, 2017	2.47
14	Puppy Bowl XIV	February 4, 2018	3.05
15	Puppy Bowl XV	February 3, 2019	1.854
16	Puppy Bowl XVI	February 2, 2020	1.85
17	Puppy Bowl XVII	February 7, 2021	2.11
18	Puppy Bowl XVIII	February 13, 2022	1.73
19	Puppy Bowl XIX	February 12, 2023	13.2 (Note: Includes viewers from simulcasts on Discovery Channel, TBS, HBO Max and Discovery+.)
20	Puppy Bowl XX	February 11, 2024	12.6 (Note: Includes viewers from simulcasts on Discovery Channel, TBS, truTV, Max and Discovery+.)
21	Puppy Bowl XXI	February 9, 2025	12.8
22	Puppy Bowl XXII	February 8, 2026	15.3
23	Puppy Bowl XXIII	February 14, 2027	TBD

== Reception and legacy ==
=== Ratings ===
Puppy Bowl III, which aired on February 4, 2007, had 7.5 million viewers.

Puppy Bowl IV, which aired on Animal Planet on February 3, 2008, had more than 8 million viewers for all its broadcasts, for a total increase of 1,060% from its first airing in 2005. It was also the first Puppy Bowl broadcast in high definition.

Puppy Bowl VI aired on February 7, 2010, and a record 1.1 million viewers watched the first broadcast alone.

Puppy Bowl VII aired on February 6, 2011, with a total of 9.2 million viewers over the twelve hours it was aired. The actual premiere drew 1.7 million viewers, up 60% from last year. Puppy Bowl VII in 2011 had a total 9.2 million estimated viewers for all airings.

Puppy Bowl VIII aired on February 5, 2012. This airing was the second most-watched social television program in America, with more than 10 million viewers over five airings. This included an increase of 17% in ratings in its target demographic group (adults age 25-to-54). More than 200,000 Puppy Bowl-related tweets were made on that day.

Puppy Bowl X aired six times over 12 hours on February 2, 2014, with new content added for each airing. A record 13.5 million people watched the show's six airings.

Puppy Bowl XI aired on February 1, 2015, and was watched by 2,767,000 viewers in its initial airing.

Puppy Bowl XII aired on February 7, 2016, and was watched by about 2.2 million viewers in its initial airing (a drop of about 21% over 2015), and 9.3 million viewers (including time-shifted viewing) over all airings. It was the number one non-sports program on cable among adults aged 25-to-54 and among women aged 18-to-49 during its initial 3 PM-to-5 PM airing. It was the number two most-watched program on all television (cable and broadcast) from 3 PM-to-5 PM among adults aged 25-to-54 and among women aged 18-to-49. Only the Super Bowl itself had more viewers. This was the fourth year in a row that the Puppy Bowl's initial airing was the second most-watched program in the nation those demographic groups.

Puppy Bowl XVI aired on February 2, 2020.

Puppy Bowl XVII aired on February 7, 2021.

Puppy Bowl XVIII aired on February 13, 2022.

Puppy Bowl XIX aired on February 12, 2023, and was simulcast on Animal Planet, TBS, Discovery Channel, Discovery+ and HBO Max (now Max). It was the first puppy bowl to go into overtime.

Puppy Bowl XX aired on February 11, 2024.

Puppy Bowl XXI aired on February 9, 2025.

Puppy Bowl XXII aired on February 8, 2026.

Advertising revenue for the 2013 show was up 19% over 2012, and drew a number of new advertisers. For the first time, Animal Planet allowed commercial branding of its "stadium" in 2013 as well. It was referred to throughout the program as the "GEICO Puppy Bowl Stadium". An aggregate of 12.4 million viewers watched part of all six airings of the Puppy Bowl in 2013.

Advertising revenue for the 2014 Puppy Bowl rose 30% over 2013. Three new companies became sponsors of the show, and Mars, Incorporated's Sheba cat food company sponsored a new "cat VIP suite".

== Spin-offs and competition ==
=== Puppy Games ===
A spinoff of the Puppy Bowl, known as Puppy Games, aired opposite NBC's primetime broadcast of the opening ceremonies of the 2008 Summer Olympics on August 8, 2008. The Puppy Games included swimming, gymnastics, boxing, and soccer, and kittens were used for the "opening ceremony." John Ramey and Mary Beth Smith, respectively, served as the play-by-play announcer and color commentator for the event.

=== Dog Bowl ===
Another spinoff, the Dog Bowl, aired on February 3, 2018, a day before Puppy Bowl XIV. It features 50 dogs ages 2–15 years separated into "Oldies" and "Goldies" and promotes the adoption of older dogs. A second edition, Dog Bowl II, aired February 2, 2019. A third edition, Dog Bowl III, aired on February 1, 2020.

=== Competing shows ===
The Puppy Bowl is the inspiration for Hallmark Channel's Kitten Bowl, which first aired in 2014. The Dog Bowl also inspired the creation of the Cat Bowl, which was first aired in 2019. The Cat Bowl features adult cats instead of kittens.

In addition, the Puppy Bowl also inspired the Fish Bowl, four hours of goldfish swimming in a bowl, which first aired in 2014 on the Nat Geo Wild cable network. Great American Family began to air Great American Rescue Bowl in 2023, which features both cats and dogs.

In 2017, Hallmark introduced Meow Madness, a cat-themed parody of the United States’ “March Madness” college basketball tournament.

In 2018, Blizzard hosted an Overwatch-themed Puppy Rumble featuring two teams of puppies playing capture the flag to celebrate the Year of the Dog in-game event and promote adoption. The event was broadcast live on Twitch.

== See also ==
- List of dog sports
