= NYXL =

NYXL may refer to:

- New York Excelsior, an American Overwatch esports team
- NYXL (company), the operating company behind New York Excelsior
