= SNY =

American regional sports network

- Type: Regional sports network
- Country: United States
- Broadcast area: New York; Connecticut, North and Central Jersey; Northeastern Pennsylvania; Nationwide (via satellite)
- Headquarters: 4 World Trade Center, Lower Manhattan, New York City

Programming
- Language: English
- Picture format: 1080i (HDTV); 480i (SDTV)

Ownership
- Owner: Sterling Entertainment Enterprises
- Parent: Sterling Equities 65%; Charter Communications 27%; NBC Sports Group 8%
- Sister channels: Spectrum Sports; NBC Sports Regional Networks

History
- Launched: March 16, 2006; 20 years ago
- Founder: Fred Wilpon

Links
- Website: www.sny.tv

Availability

Streaming media
- The MLB App: sny.tv/watch-now mlb.com/live-stream-games/subscribe/sny (U.S. cable internet subscribers only; requires login from participating providers to stream content; some events may not be available due to league rights restrictions; not supported by Xfinity)
- DirecTV Stream: Internet Protocol television
- Hulu: Internet Protocol television

SportsNet New York (SNY) is an American regional sports network owned by Sterling Entertainment Enterprises, LLC, itself a joint venture between Fred Wilpon's Sterling Equities (which owns a controlling 65% interest), Charter Communications through its acquisition of Time Warner Cable in May 2016 (which owns 27%) and Comcast, through its NBC Sports Group subsidiary (which owns 8%). The channel primarily broadcasts games and related programming involving the New York Mets, but also carries supplementary coverage of the Mets and the New York Jets as well as college sports events.

SNY maintains business operations and studio facilities at 4 World Trade Center. SportsNet New York is available on cable and fiber optic television providers throughout the New York metropolitan area and the state of New York; it is also available nationwide on satellite via DirecTV.

== History ==
SportsNet New York was created in order for the New York Mets to better leverage the team's television broadcasting rights, which were previously held by Cablevision.

From 1998 to 2002, Cablevision had a monopoly on the cable television rights to all local professional sports franchises in the New York City market through FSN New York and MSG Network. The company used those rights for various business practices (some controversial among viewers and local media analysts) such as moving certain games to its MSG Metro Channels, a group of locally based services that had limited distribution on most cable providers in the New York City metropolitan area.

In 2002, YankeeNets – then the corporate entity which owned both the New York Yankees and New Jersey Nets – ended the monopoly by launching the YES Network to serve as the local cable broadcaster of their games. The Mets continued in the Cablevision fold until that team's contract with the company (the dominant cable provider outside of Manhattan and the adjacent boroughs) expired in 2005.

On March 16, 2006, the New York Mets launched SportsNet New York in partnership with cable television providers Comcast and Time Warner Cable.

By 2011, through its majority ownership, the Mets received $68 million in revenue from SportsNet New York for the broadcast rights to its games. In 2013, Bloomberg estimated that $1.2 billion of the Mets' $2.1 billion value came from SNY.

From the network's founding until 2017, its headquarters was located in the Time-Life Building at Rockefeller Center, on the corner of Avenue of the Americas and West 51st Street in Manhattan (in the former home of the now-defunct CNN news program American Morning). In March 2017, the network relocated to 4 World Trade Center. From 2018 to 2024, NFL Network's morning show Good Morning Football was produced from SNY's studios.

In 2025, SNY announced an agreement with Major League Baseball to launch a direct-to-consumer streaming service for SNY through MLB.com and the MLB app. The agreement includes a tie-in with MLB.tv which will allow users to subscribe to a bundle including both services. Cable subscribers will be able to use TV Everywhere to stream SNY through MLB.com.

== Sports coverage ==
=== New York Mets ===
SNY serves as the primary local broadcaster of the New York Mets. It carries at least 120 games involving the team each season not televised on a national network (Fox, TBS or ESPN) or streamed exclusively through a streaming service (Apple TV+ or Roku Channel). SNY also produces a smaller broadcast schedule of games for local broadcast on Nexstar's CW affiliate WPIX (channel 11), which distributes those games to other broadcast stations in the Mets' broadcast territory. Mets game telecasts and post-game shows on SNY delays SportsNite until after the game's end.

=== New York Jets ===
In November 2005, the New York Jets signed a broadcasting agreement with SportsNet New York to carry programs relating to the NFL franchise for three years. SNY carries more than 250 hours of Jets-related content annually, including both regular season and off-season shows with access to players, coaches and management.

=== New York Yankees ===
Although the local rights for New York Yankees broadcasts belong exclusively to YES Network, SNY operates a Twitter account dedicated to Yankees highlights. Game highlights on the account are typically clips from the YES broadcast, sourced from the official Yankees Twitter account. SNY uploads their own recordings of post-game interviews to the account. The Yankees are also frequently covered on the primary SNY Twitter account.

=== Other professional sports ===
On October 1, 2014, SNY signed an agreement with the Fall Experimental Football League to carry some of the league's inaugural regular season games in October and November of that year.

On December 20, 2018, SNY and Rugby United New York of Major League Rugby announced a partnership where SNY would televise nine of the team's inaugural season games.

In June 2021, SNY announced an agreement with the New York Racing Association to air 15 weekends of horse racing from Belmont Park and Saratoga Race Course.

In 2024, SNY announced a broadcast agreement with the Binghamton Rumble Ponies, the Mets Double-A affiliate.

In 2025, SNY began broadcasting games featuring Brooklyn FC of the USL Super League.

=== College sports ===
Currently SNY airs women's college basketball from the University of Connecticut, college basketball and football games from Fordham University, college football and college basketball games from Columbia University, college football and college basketball games from Stony Brook University, college basketball and football from Monmouth University, college hockey, college soccer, college football and college basketball from Long Island University, and college hockey and college basketball games from Sacred Heart University SNY also has a package of eight nationally televised college basketball games from the Northeast Conference and annually airs the Connecticut Ice college hockey tournament.

On July 23, 2008, SNY reached an agreement with Rutgers University to become "the exclusive home" of the university's athletics program; the deal includes the rights to air encore presentations of the team's football telecasts (involving games televised by ABC or any of the ESPN networks), weekly coaches shows (for both football and basketball, such as Inside Rutgers Football) and press conferences.

Beginning in 2008, SNY carried football and basketball games involving the Big East Conference; the network lost the rights to Fox Sports 1 (through an agreement with Fox Sports) when that network launched in August 2013. The network also carried coaches shows focusing on the Seton Hall University and St. John's University basketball teams, both members of the old Big East. From its launch, SNY also carried football and basketball games from the Big Ten Conference that were not scheduled to be televised on a national network; the network lost these games to the Big Ten Network when it launched in 2007. SNY also televised college basketball games from the Sun Belt Conference through ESPN Plus, later dropping these events in 2008, in order to focus its college sports coverage on the Big East Conference.

In August 2010, the University of Connecticut announced a multi-year deal with SportsNet New York to become "the official television home" of UConn Huskies football and men's basketball. SNY will feature 300 hours of Huskies-related programming annually, including 120 hours of game coverage. In May 2012, SNY signed a four-year agreement with the university to become the exclusive broadcaster of the Huskies women's basketball team (assuming the regional rights from Connecticut Public Television), agreeing to air a minimum of 17 games per year. However, as of 2020 only women's basketball still airs on the network.

On October 31, 2013, SportsNet New York signed a broadcasting agreement with the Atlantic 10 Conference to televise the conference's college basketball games; under the initial deal, the network carried 43 Atlantic 10 basketball games during the 2013–14 season.

Until 2023, SNY also broadcast college lacrosse, college football and college basketball from Hofstra University. Those games have since moved to MSG Network.

== Original programming ==
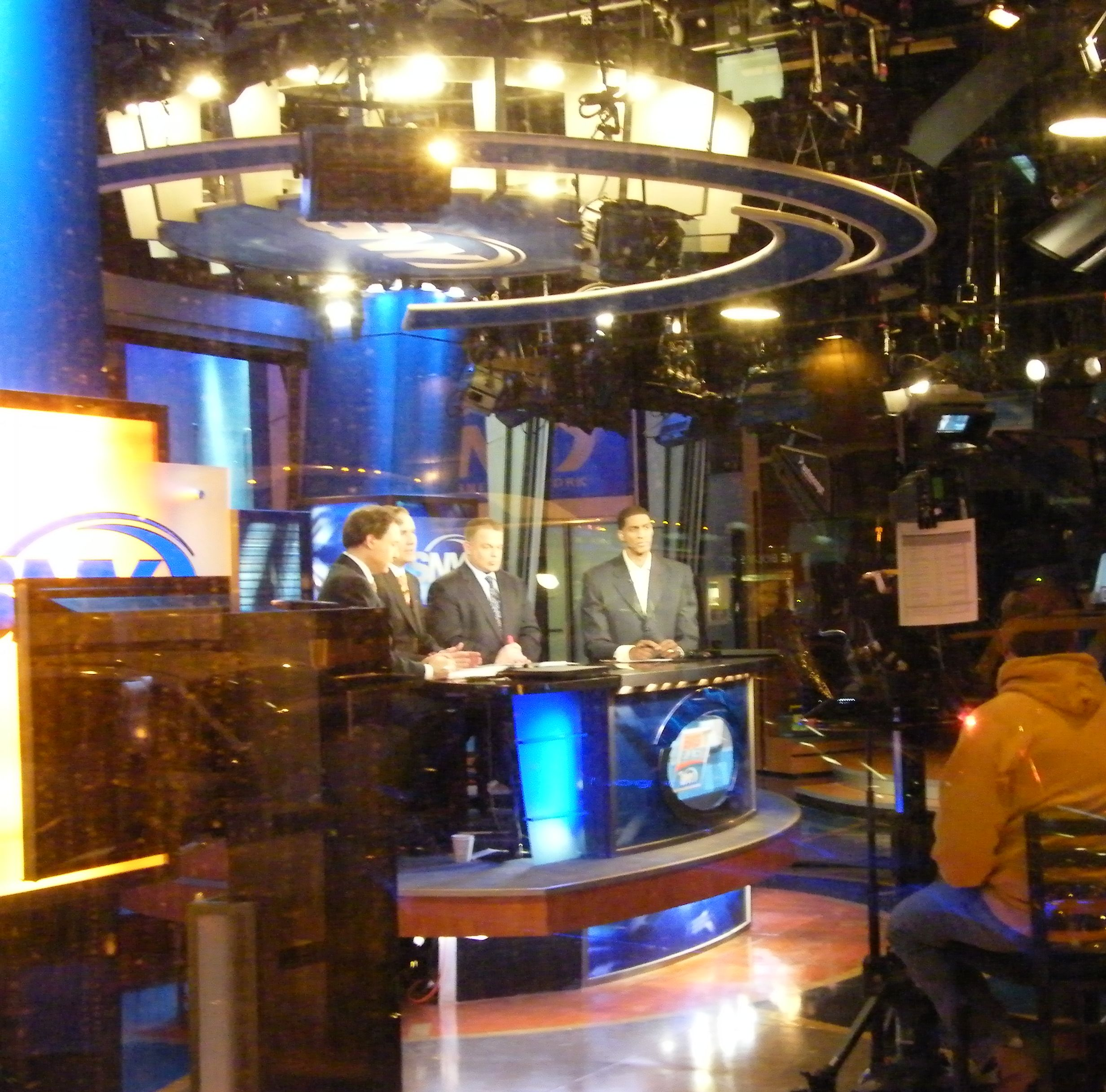
Broadcast as seen through the window of SNY's street-level studio in the Time-Life Building.

=== News and debate programs ===
- The Thread – A show introduced in March 2019, showing a social media lens on New York Sports at 5 p.m. The program features contributors from entertainment fields and popular New York radio show commentators. It is hosted by Justine Ward, with various SNY contributors.
- Honda SportsNite – A daily half-hour sports highlights show airing at 11:00 p.m. and throughout the night (with a rebroadcast from 6:00 to 9:00 a.m. and 12:00 to 1:00 p.m., the latter not airing on weekends or on days when a Mets game is scheduled for 1:00 p.m. or earlier start). The 11:00 edition is pre-empted on nights when a Mets telecast starts at or after 8:00 p.m.
- Loudmouths – A half-hour sports talk show (airing weeknights at 5:30 p.m.), in which host Jon Hein and various SNY panelists debate the top sports topics of the day. Occasionally, the hosts have themed broadcasts and predict the winners for future NFL games for the coming week.
- Baseball Night New York - a primetime baseball-related program that airs on 6:00 pm weekdays hosted by Sal Licata, focused on news and insights of New York City's two baseball teams.
- Carton and Roberts - SNY simulcast of WFAN-AM and WFAN-FM afternoon drive radio program hosted by Craig Carton and Evan Roberts (airing weekday afternoons from 4:00 pm to 6:00 pm beginning in May 2021, head to head with YES Network's simulcast of The Michael Kay Show).

=== Entertainment programs ===
- Beer Money! – A half-hour game show (airing Sundays at 7:00 p.m.), in which hosts Amber Wilson and Dan Schachner visit bars throughout New York and New Jersey asking contestants questions pertaining to New York sports, in three rounds (with prize amounts of $10, $20, and $100); contestants choose to leave the game with their existing prize total at any time, or continue on, risking losing the money if they give a wrong answer. The program also features a two-contestant shootout round for a $50 prize, in which the first contestant to answer a question wrong loses. A similar program with the same title airs on SportsTime Ohio, while New England Sports Network (NESN) carried a similarly formatted program, Pocket Money.

=== Mets-related programs ===
- Mets Classics – Broadcasts of archived Mets games from past seasons and the current season (UltiMet Classics).
- Mets Fast Forward – A condensed one-hour replay of the previous day's Mets game telecast on SNY or WPIX (airing at 6:00 and 9:00 a.m. following a Mets game).
- Mets Insider – A bi-weekly, half-hour magazine-style program geared towards a diverse range of Mets topics.
- Mets Kids Clubhouse – A weekly half-hour baseball edutainment program for children, hosted by Neha Joy (airing Saturdays at 12:00 p.m.).
- Mets Hot Stove – An offseason "hot stove" discussion about the Mets, hosted by Gary Apple with various local writers.
- Mets Pre-Game Live – A half-hour program previewing the upcoming Mets game/series.
- Mets Post-Game Live – A half-hour program providing recaps and analysis of the day's Mets game and previews of upcoming matchups.
- Mets Weekly – A weekly half-hour magazine program featuring team coverage, interviews, and stories on the Mets (airing Sundays at 6:00 p.m.).
- Mets Yearbook – A half-hour program of past Mets year in reviews from 1962 to 1988.
- Mets Year in Review – A program recapping the Mets season since 2009.
- Mets Amazin' Finishes - A program recapping the best games in various seasons in a countdown list. Frequently played during rain delays.

== On-air staff ==
=== Current on-air staff ===
==== Hosts and analysts ====
- Joe Benigno – Daily News Live panelist
- Willie Colon – Jets post-game studio analyst; Jets Nation and NFL analyst
- Jon Hein – Loudmouths co-host
- Ray Lucas – Jets post-game studio analyst; Jets Nation and NFL analyst
- Eamon McAnaney – Honda SportsNite anchor and reporter; Loudmouths and Daily News Live co-host; fill-in Mets pre-game and post-game studio analyst
- Sweeny Murti – Yankees beat reporter
- Jonas Schwartz – Daily News Live host and studio host
- Bart Scott – Jets post-game studio analyst; Jets Nation and NFL analyst
- Michelle Yu – Honda SportsNite anchor and reporter; Daily News Live co-host.

==== New York Mets telecasts ====
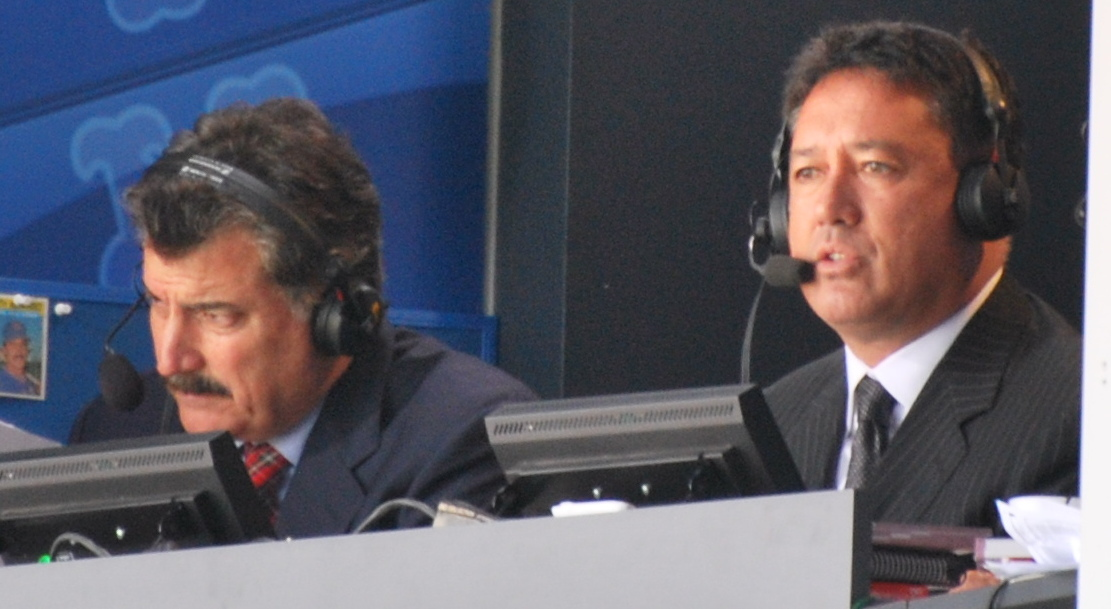
Hernandez and Darling broadcasting a Mets game for SNY from the booth at Citi Field in 2010

- Gary Apple – Mets pre-game and post-game studio host, host of Mets Hot Stove, fill-in play-by-play announcer
- Jerry Blevins – fill-in Mets pre-game and post-game studio analyst
- Gary Cohen – Mets play-by-play announcer
- Terry Collins – fill-in Mets pre-game and post-game studio analyst
- Ron Darling – Mets color commentator/game analyst
- Jim Duquette – fill-in Mets pre-game and post-game studio analyst
- Steve Gelbs – Mets field reporter and fill-in play-by-play announcer, host of Mets Amazin' Finishes
- Keith Hernandez – Mets color commentator/game analyst
- Michelle Margaux – Mets fill-in field reporter
- Todd Zeile – Mets pre-game/post-game studio analyst and fill-in Mets color commentator

=== Notable former on-air staff ===
- Steve Berthiaume – SportsNite anchor (2006–2007; left network in January 2007 and rejoined ESPN, now the lead broadcaster for the Arizona Diamondbacks)
- Kevin Burkhardt – Mets field reporter and alternate play-by-play announcer; host of Mets Hot Stove (2007–2014; now lead play-by-play announcer for NFL on Fox)
- Chris Carlin – GEICO SportsNite anchor; Loudmouths co-host; and Mets Pre Game and Post Game Live host and Rutgers football and basketball analyst
- Julie Donaldson – host of Mets Weekly (2006–2007; now anchor/reporter at NBC Sports Washington)
- Scott Ferrall – Daily News Live and Wheelhouse personality (2007–2009; now host of nationally syndicated radio show for CBS Sports Radio)
- Nelson Figueroa - Mets pre and post-game analyst (2015–2019)
- Ralph Kiner – fill-in Mets color commentator/game analyst (2006–2013) (deceased)
- Meredith Marakovits – GEICO SportsNite anchor and reporter; Daily News Live co-host (2009–2011; now at YES Network)
- Lee Mazzilli – studio analyst on Mets pre and post-game shows (2007–2008)
- Kaitlin Monte – Mets Insider host (2013–2014; now at KRIV in Houston)
- Bob Ojeda – Mets pre-game and post-game studio analyst (2009–2014)
- Wayne Randazzo - Mets alternate play-by-play announcer (now lead play-by-play broadcaster for the Los Angeles Angels and Apple TV+)
- Harold Reynolds – studio analyst on Mets pre-game and post-game shows (2008; joined the MLB Network in 2009)
- Gary Thorne - Mets alternate play-by-play announcer
- Bobby Valentine – fill-in Mets pre-game and post-game studio analyst
- Matt Yallof – host of Mets pre-game and post-game shows (2006–2008; joined MLB Network in 2009)

== Availability ==
At its launch, it was originally expected that SNY would experience issues with trying to gain carriage on Cablevision, as the Mets moved their game telecasts from that company's two regional sports networks, MSG Network and FSN New York (now MSG Sportsnet or MSGSN). The situation was similar to that experienced by the YES Network, the Yankees ended its broadcasting agreement with Cablevision. Cablevision filed a lawsuit against Sterling Entertainment Enterprises on the grounds that the franchise might have violated their contract, which theoretically had one year left to run, as well as the right of last refusal. However, a judge ruled in favor of Sterling Entertainment, essentially stating that the Mets had voided their deal with Cablevision entirely by paying a specified buyout fee, believed to have exceeded $50 million.

Comcast began carrying the network on its Hartford area systems on March 31, 2008. Then in July 2008, just days after the University of Connecticut signed its broadcast deal with SNY, Cox Communications began carrying SportsNet New York on channel 62 throughout its Connecticut service area. On August 29, 2011, the network launched a secondary feed for Connecticut, SNY-CT.

SNY is also available on Comcast systems in Palm Beach County, Florida and nationally on Verizon Fios. However, due to broadcasting rules imposed by Major League Baseball (MLB) that restrict local telecasts to within their designated broadcast territory, Mets games televised by the network are blacked out, although pre-game and post-game shows and other non-event programming is cleared for broadcast in Palm Beach County.

Beginning in 2017, SNY made Mets games available for live Internet streaming to subscribers via its website and the NBC Sports app but has been yet to be made authorizable to Comcast Xfinity subscribers though Comcast is the owner of the NBC Sports app and is part owner of SNY. In 2022, SNY launched its own app, serving much the same purpose with much the same availability.

On February 18, 2025, SNY announced that it had partnered with MLB, making streaming Mets games and other SNY media now available on the MLB app.

== See also ==
- Media of New York City
- List of New York City sports teams

| Preceded by FSN New York; 1980–2005 (split with MSG Network, 2002–2005) | Over-the-air (cable); Home of the New York Mets; 2006–present | Succeeded by incumbent |
