= Super Bowl Sunday =

Day on which the Super Bowl is held

Super Sunday
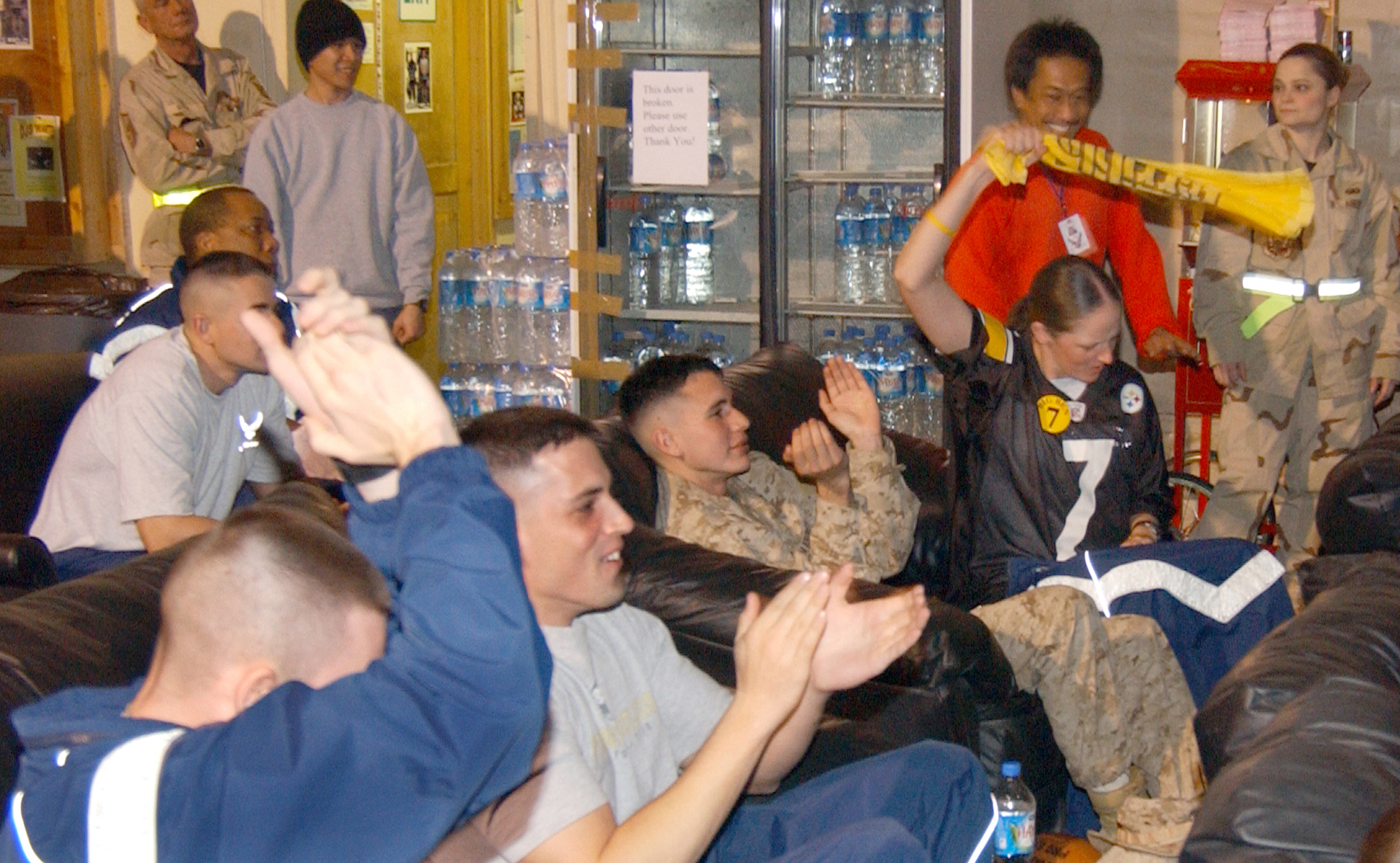
- United States Air Force Super Bowl XL party in 2006
- Official name: Super Sunday
- Also called: Super Bowl Sunday
- Observed by: United States, Canada, and international
- Date: Second Sunday in February
- 2025 date: February 9
- 2026 date: February 8
- 2027 date: February 14
- 2028 date: February 13
- Frequency: Annual
- First time: January 15, 1967

Super Bowl Sunday is the day on which the Super Bowl, the National Football League (NFL)'s annual championship game, is played. It was the first Sunday in February from Super Bowl XXXVIII in 2004 until Super Bowl LV in 2021, but is now the second Sunday, beginning with Super Bowl LVI. Festivities typically involve groups of people gathering to watch the game.

== Festivities ==
Many families and friends gather together to watch the game, including those who are not normally football fans. Although sports bars are busy with viewers, it is also common for people to watch the game from home due to the increasing size of televisions as well as to save money.

Because watching the Super Bowl is so popular, stores are often empty of shoppers during the game, particularly in the regions represented by the two teams playing, and water usage drops, with significant rises in use during halftime and after the game, as fans use the bathroom. Churches sometimes cancel afternoon or evening services, hold football-themed charity drives, or deliver sermons designed to appeal to male members of the congregation.

NFL executives have called for a three-day weekend in order to allow fans to celebrate the event, and there is thought to be a loss of productivity in the American workforce on Monday after the event. The television network carrying the game (either CBS, Fox, ABC, or NBC) will usually devote the entire day's programming schedule to the game, with extended pregame shows, NFL Films retrospectives of the previous season, and special versions of the Sunday morning talk shows in the morning and afternoon hours leading into the game. Since 2004, there has been a tradition for the U.S. president to sit down for an interview, lately with the network's news division. Competing networks, due to the severe loss of viewers to the Super Bowl, generally resort to low-cost counterprogramming measures like the Puppy Bowl.

Alternative football leagues have, especially since the Pro Bowl moved to the week before the Super Bowl, frequently begun their seasons the weekend following Super Bowl Sunday to capitalize on football fans seeking more football after the end of the NFL season. Examples include the Arena Football League from 2002 to 2006, Alliance of American Football in 2019, Fan Controlled Football in 2021, and all incarnations of the XFL to date, including 2001, 2020 and 2023.

== Food ==
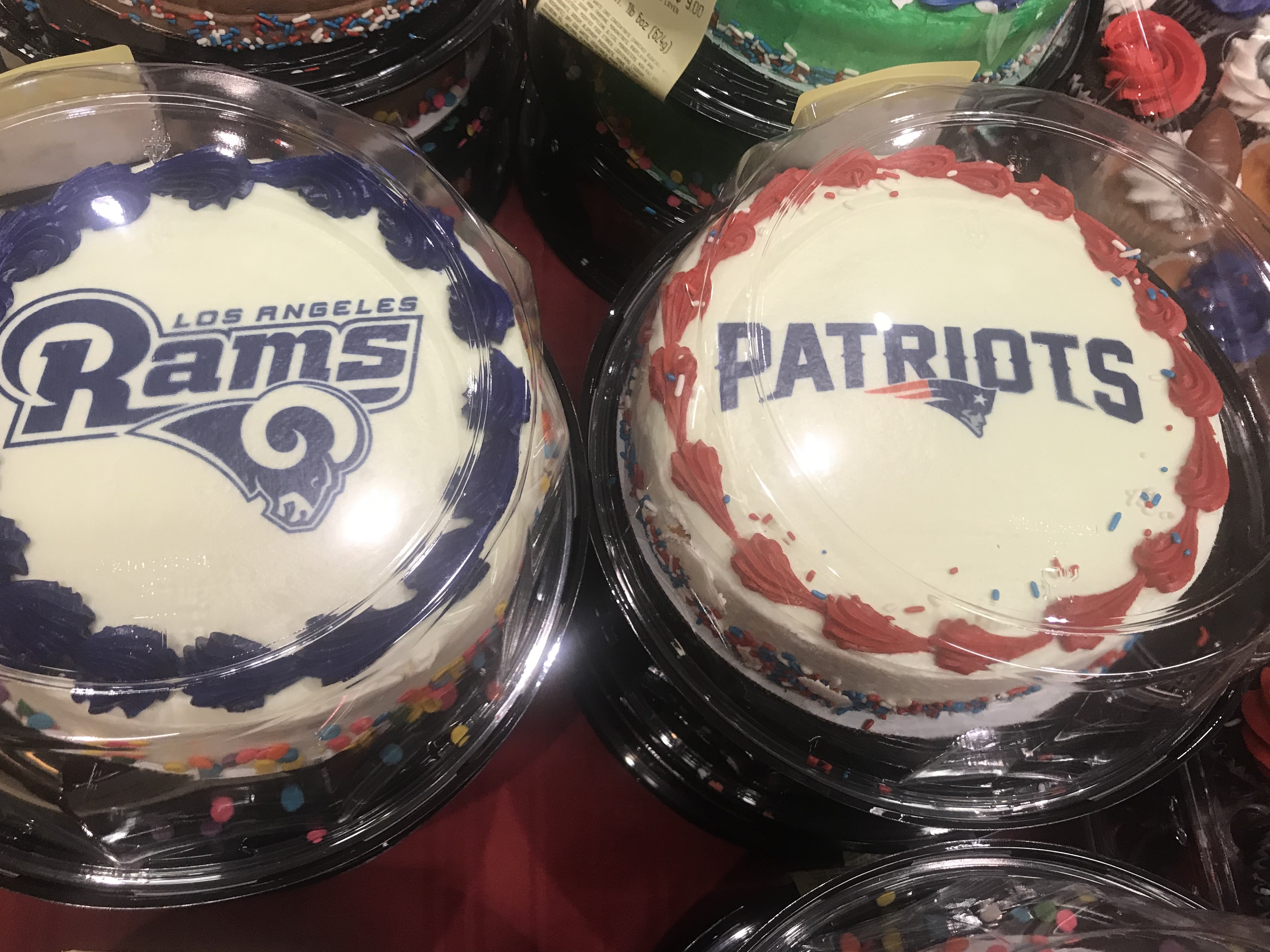
Cakes bearing the logos of the Los Angeles Rams and New England Patriots ahead of Super Bowl LIII

Large amounts of food and alcohol are consumed. It is the second-largest food consumption event in the United States, behind Thanksgiving dinner, and some police departments have noticed a dramatic increase in drunk driving.

Food is usually served buffet style, rather than as a sit-down meal. Foods traditionally eaten include buffalo wings, chili, ribs, dipping sauces, pizza, and potato chips. Many pizza delivery businesses see their order numbers double, and as of 2011 about 28 million pounds (13,000 t) of chips, 1.25 billion chicken wings and 8 million pounds (3,600 t) of guacamole are consumed.
