= Jill Rappaport =

American journalist and animal advocate

- Born: Detroit, Michigan, U.S.
- Occupations: Journalist, animal advocate, author

Jill Rappaport is an American television journalist, animal advocate and author. She was a correspondent for NBC's Today for more than two decades, initially as its entertainment reporter. She created and hosted the NBC special Best in Shelter with Jill Rappaport and hosts the Animal Planet special Dog Bowl, which promotes the adoption of older shelter dogs.

== Early life ==
Rappaport was born in Detroit and grew up in Bloomfield Hills, Michigan, where her family kept dogs, cats, birds and horses.

== Career ==
Rappaport began her career as a film publicist at United Artists, working on films including Rocky and Apocalypse Now, before becoming a fashion and then entertainment reporter. In the 1980s, she co-hosted PM Magazine in New York with Matt Lauer, and later worked at WCBS-TV.

She then joined NBC's Today, where she was the entertainment reporter for her first 16 years before becoming a general correspondent. On Today, she presented "Bow to Wow", a series featuring shelter animals. She also reported for NBC Nightly News.

In 2015, she created Best in Shelter with Jill Rappaport, an NBC special about shelter animal adoption. She had previously hosted the Puppy Bowl segment "Pup Close and Personal".

== Animal advocacy ==
Rappaport has served as an Equine Welfare Ambassador for the ASPCA. She has received two Genesis Awards and the first "Voice for the Animals" award from the Humane Society of the United States, as well as the ASPCA's Presidential Service Award for Media Excellence.

== Personal life ==
Rappaport lives on a farm in The Hamptons, New York, with rescued dogs and horses.

== Bibliography ==
- Jack Jill: The Miracle Dog with a Happy Tail to Tell, Collins, 2009, ISBN 9780061731365
- 500 Cats, HarperCollins, 2009, ISBN 9780061799099
- Mazel Tov: Celebrities' Bat Mitzvah Memories, Simon & Schuster, 2007, ISBN 9780743287876
- People We Know, Horses They Love, Rodale Books, 2004, ISBN 9781579548575
