= Saul Katz =

American real estate developer

Saul B. Katz
- Born: February 17, 1939 (age 87); Brooklyn, New York, U.S.
- Education: B.A. Brooklyn College
- Occupation: Real estate developer
- Known for: Co-founder of Sterling Equities; Former President of the New York Mets; Associate of Bernie Madoff
- Spouse: Iris Wilpon
- Children: Heather Katz Knopf; Natalie Katz O’Brien; David M. Katz
- Family: Fred Wilpon (brother-in-law)

Saul Katz (born February 17, 1939) is an American real estate developer, former president of the New York Mets and accused Bernie Madoff co-conspirator.

== Early life ==
Katz was born to a Jewish family in Brooklyn. He graduated from Brooklyn College in 1960 with a degree in accounting.

== Sterling Equities ==
Katz is a co-founder of Sterling Equities. In 1972, he cofounded Sterling Equities, a commercial real estate development company, with his brother-in-law Fred Wilpon. They built a development of townhouses in Tarrytown, a suburb in Westchester County which was very successful. Seeking to minimize their tax obligations, they purchased real estate throughout the country that had favorable tax treatment which turned out to be a boon since they were unknowingly buying property at the bottom of the market.

Sterling Equities was a significant investor in Bernie Madoff's fraudulent investment fund with 483 accounts. Merrill Lynch warned Saul Katz on several occasions about Madoff's operation, as did numerous other financial professionals. Sterling Equities ignored these warnings collectively receiving $300 million via the Madoff operation ultimately revealed as a fraud. The Madoff fraud collapsed and Sterling Equities owners were sued by the trustee representing the victims of Bernard L. Madoff’s Ponzi scheme who claimed they "knew or should have known Madoff was operating a fraud."

In 2012, it was reported that Sterling Equities was to receive a gift of 23 acres of land from New York City with the intention of developing the land into a shopping mall. The city had recently spent almost $500 million acquiring and improving that same land. The Attorney General of New York, Eric Schneiderman reached a settlement agreement regarding illegal lobbying on behalf of Sterling Equities. In 2015, a New York state court ruled that the because part of the plan involved private development of public parkland it was illegal. By 2018, the plans for a shopping mall had been shelved and the de Blasio administration was supporting a plan centered around affordable housing. The deal was approved by the Queens Borough Board. It will include an acre of open space, an elementary school, and 1100 affordable apartments.

== New York Mets ==
Saul Katz first bought an ownership stake in the New York Mets in 1980. In addition, he served as the President of the Brooklyn Cyclones, a Mets minor league affiliate.

Katz became President of the Mets in 2003. During Katz's time as president of the Mets, it has been reported that sexual harassment was rampant. The culture was described as "rotten." This included bullying a pregnant woman and sending a reporter harassing text messages including photos of an erect penis. Allegedly, the "behavior was widely known in the Mets front office." in 2021, new owner Steve Cohen hired a law firm to look into the accusations of harassment, misconduct, and discrimination during Katz's tenure.

The Mets rarely made money under Katz's leadership. Nearly every dollar the Mets earned passed through Bernie Madoff's investment funds. The collapse of Madoff's fraudulent investment scheme came close to bankrupting the Mets. It also likely contributed to their inconsistent record on the field. The team did not win a World Championship after 1986 and appeared in the playoffs only three times, during 2006, 2015, and 2016, during Katz’s time as president. In 2014, Katz was rumored to be interested in selling his ownership stake in the Mets. Katz and his fellow owners sold a minority stake and, eventually, total ownership in the team.

When the 2020 MLB season was delayed and later shortened due to the COVID-19 pandemic, employees complained about not being paid and not hearing anything from the Mets owners. By comparison, Nets owner Joseph Tsai announced he would be paying non-salaried Barclays Center employees within one day after the NBA season was canceled.

In 2020, a deal to sell the team to hedge fund billionaire Steve Cohen fell through over issues of team control. A similar deal with David Einhorn had fallen through in 2011. In February 2020, it was reported that Katz and his partners were willing to sell the team without maintaining control. In August, Cohen again entered into exclusive negotiations to buy the Mets. In September a deal was reached for Cohen to purchase 95% of the franchise from Katz and the Wilpons for approximately $2.4 billion and on October 30, he was approved by MLB's owners. Katz was then succeeded as president by Sandy Alderson.

== Madoff Ponzi scheme ==
Saul Katz, Fred Wilpon, and Jeff Wilpon were portrayed as co-conspirators in the Bernie Madoff Ponzi scheme. Sterling Equities and individuals affiliated with Katz and Wilpon received $300 million in respect of investments in the Bernard Madoff Ponzi scheme. Lawyers for the Madoff Trustee cited evidence that Sterling partners shopped for fraud insurance as evidence they were "well aware" that Madoff was carrying out a Ponzi scheme. Wilpon and Katz "categorically reject[ed]" the charge that they "ignored warning signs" about Madoff's fraud. Irving H. Picard, the Madoff Trustee, has alleged that Katz's relationship with Mr. Madoff was extensive and longstanding and that they continued even after suspicions were raised. Picard sued Katz, his partner Fred Wilpon, and Sterling Equities for 1 billion in illegal profits from the scheme. In 2012, Saul Katz, Gregory Katz, Fred Wilpon, Jeff Wilpon and other Sterling Equities partners settled with Picard for $162 million.

== Bayou Hedge Fund Group Ponzi Scheme ==
Saul Katz and his partner and brother-in-law Fred Wilpon were involved in another Ponzi scheme which was orchestrated by Samuel Israel III and they were forced to pay $13 million to investors when Israel's hedge fund collapsed. Through their partnership with Peter Stamos, Sterling Stamos, Wilpon and Katz were accused of withdrawing nearly all of their $30 million investment from the fund immediately before it collapsed. They settled in 2009 for $12.9 million.

== Personal life ==
Katz is married to Iris Katz, sister of the Mets managing partner Fred Wilpon. They have three children: Heather Katz Knopf, Natalie Katz O’Brien, and David M. Katz. The Katzes live in Glen Cove, New York and have a winter home in Boca Raton, Florida. Saul Katz was personally close with Bernie Madoff describing him as "a man who we were friends with for 35 years."
