= NYXL (company) =

American esports organization

- Formerly: Andbox
- Type: Private
- Industry: Esports
- Founded: June 10, 2019
- Founders: Scott Wilpon; Farzam Kamel; Rohit Gupta
- Headquarters: Manhattan, New York, US
- Key people: James Frey (CEO); Farzam Kamel (President)
- Parent: Sterling VC
- Subsidiaries: New York Excelsior; New York Subliners; NY Fury; NYSL Mayhem
- Website: nyxl.com

NYXL is an American collective esports and gaming organization based in New York. Launched under the name Andbox in 2019 by Sterling.VC, an investment fund backed by Sterling Equities, to operate esports franchises New York Excelsior and New York Subliners, it was the first esports organization in New York to span multiple franchises. The organization established two more esports teams by 2021, and in March 2022, it rebranded as NYXL.

== History ==
=== Andbox (2019–2022) ===
In July 2017, video game company Activision Blizzard announced that Jeff Wilpon, co-founder and partner of Sterling.VC, an investment fund backed by Sterling Equities, had purchased a team, later branded as the New York Excelsior, for the upcoming Overwatch League, a professional, city-based, franchised esports league for the video game Overwatch. In May 2019, Activision Blizzard announced that Sterling.VC had purchased the New York franchise slot, with the team later branded the New York Subliners, for Activision Blizzard's second professional, city-based, franchised esports league, the Call of Duty League. To oversee the two franchises, Sterling.VC established New York's first esports organization to span multiple franchises, Andbox, which was unveiled on June 10, 2019 and would be headed by co-founders Scott Wilpon, Farzam Kamel and Rohit Gupta.

Andbox entered its third esports market in September 2020, signing a Valorant team, which would compete under the Andbox name. In June 2021, the organization partnered with Trovo Mayhem to create a new Call of Duty Mobile team, in which Trovo Mayhem was renamed to NYSL Mayhem. Andbox named A Million Little Pieces author James Frey as its first CEO in January 2022.

=== NYXL (2022–present) ===
On March 23, 2022, Andbox rebranded as NYXL. Along with the rebrand, the organization announced that it would be making a seven-figure investment into New York City's gaming community over the coming year, which includes building its headquarters, XLHQ, in Manhattan and establishing a youth training program, YXL. NYXL also rebranded their Valorant team from Andbox to the New York Fury.

On July 14, 2022 to Sunday, July 17, 2022, NYXL hosted the Call of Duty League Major IV at Kings Theatre (Brooklyn). The event featured a NYXL x Mountain Dew NFT and Cryptocurrency collaboration on Decentraland. On December 19, 2022, NYXL announced that they would no longer be hosting Major IV.
