= SFCG Co. =

SFCG CO., LTD.
- Company type: Private corporation (TSE First Section: 8597; listed between 1999 and 2009)
- Industry: Finance industry
- Headquarters: Nihonbashi Muromachi Center Bldg., 3-2-15 Muromachi, Nihonbashi, Chūō, Tokyo, Japan 103-8305 (Tel: 03-3270-1248)
- Key people: Kenshin Ōshima 大島健伸 (President)
- Products: Loans to small businesses underwritten by guarantors, secured loans, commercial discount notes
- Revenue: (consolidated) 34,327 million yen (As of July 2007)
- Total assets: (separate) 666,199 million yen (consolidated) 847,008 million yen (As of July 2007)
- Number of employees: separate) 109 (consolidated) 1,605 (As of July 2007)
- Parent: KE Holdings 52.92%
- Subsidiaries: T-ZONE Holdings
- Website: www.sfcg.jp
- Footnotes / references Stock capitalization: 79,149.15 million yen Annual closing date: July 31

SFCG CO., LTD. (株式会社SFCG), a subsidiary of KE Holdings (株式会社KEホールディングス), is engaged in money-lending in Japan. The company filed for bankruptcy protection in February 2009.

== History ==
The company was founded in 1978 under the name Shōkō Fund (株式会社商工ファンド), and changed to its current name in 2002. Its main areas of business include loans to businesses and discounting bills. It is also noted for the fact that it has many foreign shareholders.

In June 2007, 46 companies, all named [name of prefecture] Asset Finance Co., Ltd., were established as finance subsidiaries throughout Japan. These subsidiaries take charge of extending loans to customers, all branch offices were closed. Currently, SFCG operates a loan office only in Tokyo and is under the jurisdiction of the Tokyo Metropolitan Government.

== Related Companies ==
=== Parent Company ===
- KE Holdings Co., Ltd. - A related company wholly owned by the founder (including indirect ownership of 9.36%). The founder is the representative director and president of both KE Holdings and SFCG. KE Holdings owns 52.92% of SFCG stock.

=== Major Subsidiaries ===
- Japan Asset Finance Co., Ltd. – Intermediary holding company for SME loan business
  - Tokyo Asset Finance Co., Ltd. and 45 other companies (one subsidiary each for 46 prefectures) – Took over the business operations of SFCG
- T-ZONE Holdings Inc. – Intermediate holding company for investment business
  - T-ZONE Strategy Corporation- Sales of personal computer products
  - Former TZCS, Inc. (formerly T-ZONE Capital)- Merged with SFCG on March 26, 2008
- TZCI, Inc.
- Justice Servicer Co., Ltd. – Loan collection business (servicer)
