= Dan Schachner =

Dan Schachner is an American television personality, announcer, and actor. He is best known for serving as the referee of Puppy Bowl, the annual television special broadcast by Animal Planet.

Schachner worked as a television host and announcer before becoming the referee of Puppy Bowl. He hosted Your Pet Wants This, an Animal Planet program about pet products and technology.

Schachner auditioned for the Puppy Bowl referee position by producing a video in which he pretended to officiate dogs playing at parks in Manhattan and gave a motivational speech to a dog he was fostering. He was subsequently selected for the role.

== Puppy Bowl ==
Schachner has served as the referee of Puppy Bowl, a television special featuring adoptable dogs in a fictional American football game since 2012. The program uses football terminology and rules as a framework for the dogs' play, with Schachner calling humorous penalties and officiating the competition between Team Ruff and Team Fluff.

In 2014, Time interviewed Schachner about his work as the Puppy Bowl referee and the fictional penalties he called during the game. The Television Academy also profiled Schachner during production of the 2014 event.

In 2024, People reported that Schachner adopted his first dog, a poodle mix named Whistle, after fostering dogs for more than a decade. Schachner had fostered over 40 dogs before adopting Whistle who appeared with him on Puppy Bowl XX as a mini-referee. After adopting her Schachner renamed her Papi.

In 2026, Schachner returned as referee for Puppy Bowl XXII, his 15th year in the role. The event featured 150 rescue dogs from 72 shelters and introduced a special exhibition game featuring senior dogs.

== Animal welfare ==
As an advocate for animal rescue and fostering, Schachner hosts fundraisers for rescue charities across the country. In 2018 he was awarded the "Animal Welfare Hero" award from the Baltimore Humane Society.

== Television and announcer work ==
Schachner has also worked extensively as an announcer and host for television programs, including HGTV's Curb Appeal. He currently works on The Drew Barrymore Show.
