= Kenshin Ōshima =

Japanese businessperson (born 1948)

- Born: February 26, 1948 (age 78)
- Other name: 大島健伸
- Education: Keio University
- Known for: Founder of SFCG Co.
- Spouse: Yuriko Oshima
- Children: 2
- Relatives: Bruce Wilpon (son-in-law)

Kenshin Ōshima (Japanese 大島健伸; born February 26, 1948) is a Japanese billionaire and founder of finance company SFCG Co.

== Biography ==
Ōshima is a graduate of Keio University. He serves as president of SFCG Co. which lends to small-to-medium size firms. It was known for its aggressive debt collection techniques. He is married and has two children. His eldest child is Yoshihito Oshima (jp:大島嘉仁) (b. 1975). His daughter, Yuki Oshima-Wilpon (born 1976), was married to Bruce Wilpon, son of Fred Wilpon, the owner of the New York Mets; she is also divorced from Nicky Scott, close friend of Prince Harry.

As of 2006, his net worth was listed at $1.2 billion.
