= Jeff Wilpon =

American baseball executive

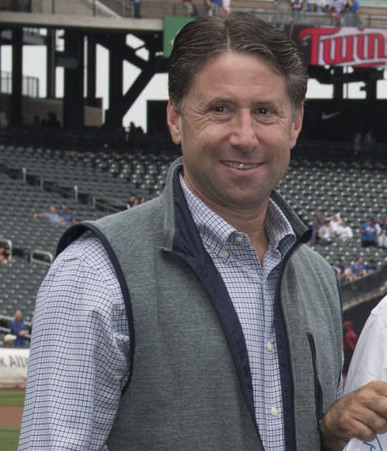
- Wilpon at Citi Field in 2016
- Born: December 9, 1961 (age 64); Brooklyn, New York City, U.S.
- Education: Palm Beach State College
- Known for: Former Chief Operating Officer of the New York Mets; Investor in the New York Excelsior
- Spouse: Valerie Goldman
- Parent(s): Judy Kessler Wilpon; Fred Wilpon
- Relatives: Saul Katz (uncle)

Jeffrey Scott Wilpon (born December 9, 1961) is an American businessman who was an executive vice-president of Sterling Equities, and the owner of the Overwatch League Esports team the New York Excelsior. He is the former COO of the New York Mets baseball team and son of the former principal owner of the New York Mets Fred Wilpon.

Jeff and other Wilpon family members invested with Bernie Madoff's ponzi scheme that collapsed in 2008. Unlike many who lost their investments, it was revealed in the Madoff firm's court case, Securities Investor Protection Corp. vs. Bernard L. Madoff Investment Securities LLC (USBC SDNY No. 08-01789), that the family partnership run by Wilpon made $48 million in their dealings with the firm. He was a member of the board of directors for the United States Holocaust Memorial Museum in Washington, D.C., and is currently a trustee of the National September 11 Memorial & Museum.

== Biography ==
Wilpon was born to a Jewish family, the son of Judy (née Kessler) and Fred Wilpon, the co-founder of the real estate development firm Sterling Equities and former majority owner of the New York Mets. He has two siblings. His sister, Robin Wilpon, is married to Phillip Wachtler, son of former Chief Judge of the New York Court of Appeals, Sol Wachtler. His brother, Bruce Wilpon, is a partner at Sterling Equities and was married to Yuki Oshima-Wilpon, daughter of Japanese billionaire Kenshin Ōshima. His uncle is Saul Katz. Wilpon is a graduate of Roslyn High School in Roslyn, New York. He was drafted by the Montreal Expos in 1983 as a favor to his father but was cut by the Jamestown Expos without appearing in a game. He served as chief officer of development and construction and oversaw the planning and development of Citi Field. He formerly served as an executive vice-president of Sterling Equities.

== Criticism ==
Wilpon was criticized by some for being too much of a meddler in the baseball operations for the New York Mets. In 2010, Joel Sherman of the New York Post wrote, "Let's give Jeff Wilpon the benefit of the doubt here for a moment. Let's say he is not short-tempered. Tone deaf. A credit seeker. An accountability deflector. A micro-manager. A second-guesser. A less-than-deep thinker. And bad at self-awareness. Fine, he's none of these things. But here is the problem: This is his perception in the industry as the Mets try yet again to fix their baseball operations department."

Sherman also cited a baseball executive in regular contact with the Mets, who said, "Jeff is the problem with the organization, and he is never going to realize that. He cannot help himself. He has to be involved. He will never hire anyone who will not let him have major input. He will not hire anyone who does not run every personnel decision through him." An AL executive added, "The only person with a worse reputation than Jeff Wilpon in the game is [Marlins president] David Samson."

In 2009, Peter Gammons told ESPN Radio that Mets GM Omar Minaya "isn't the General Manager. Jeff Wilpon is. Omar's the one out there to take the heat."

In 2003, the team's previous partner, Nelson Doubleday, Jr., told The Star-Ledger: "Mr. Jeff Wilpon has decided that he's going to learn how to run a baseball team and take over at the end of the year… Run for the hills, boys. I think probably all those baseball people will bail... Jeff sits there by himself like he's King Tut waiting for his camel."

Commentators on the internet and in broadcast media have referred to Jeff Wilpon as "Fredo" Wilpon, after the ineffectual member of the Corleone family, Fredo Corleone, played by John Cazale in The Godfather and The Godfather Part II.

In September 2014, Wilpon was named as a defendant in a lawsuit by Leigh Castergine, the first female senior vice president of ticket sales in the history of the Mets. According to the civil complaint filed by Castergine's attorney, Wilpon repeatedly disparaged her for having a child out of wedlock and then terminated her employment when she complained to human resources.

== Personal life ==
He is married to Valerie (née Goldman) Wilpon. Their son, Bradley Wilpon, was drafted by the Boston Red Sox in 2014, and has played two summers for the Newport Gulls of the NECBL.

Blizzard Entertainment announced in July 2017 that Wilpon had bought ownership in the New York Excelsior, one of the first seven teams planned for the professional esports Overwatch League. As of 2023, Excelsior was owned by NYXL (company). Sterling VC, a venture capital arm of Sterling Equities, is the primary investor in NYXL.
