= Sterling Equities =

American business group

- Industry: Real Estate, Sports, and Media
- Founded: 1972
- Founders: Fred Wilpon and Saul Katz
- Headquarters: Great Neck, New York, US
- Key people: Fred Wilpon (Chairman) and Saul Katz (President)
- Website: sterlingequities.com

Sterling Equities is a diversified, family-run group of companies based in Great Neck, New York whose portfolio consists primarily of holdings in real estate, sports, and media in the New York area. These include SportsNet New York, the New York Excelsior, Sterling Project Development, and a number of real estate investment portfolios and real estate services businesses. The firm became embroiled in the Bernie Madoff Scandal exposing a relationship between Sterling Equities partners and Bernie Madoff spanning 20 years. The partners eventually settled a billion dollar suit with the Madoff Trustee, Irving Picard, for $161 million.

== Holdings and history ==
Sterling Equities is a diversified, family-run group of companies whose portfolio consists primarily of holdings in real estate, sports, and media in the New York area. These formerly included the New York Mets of Major League Baseball (an interest was acquired in 1980, and it was a full owner from 2002 to 2020, when Steve Cohen bought the team and the Mets' low-level Minor League Baseball affiliate, the Brooklyn Cyclones), but continue to include SportsNet New York (a regional sports TV network it formed in 2005), the New York Excelsior of Overwatch League, Sterling Project Development, and a number of real estate investment portfolios and real estate services businesses (it has developed nearly 25 million square feet of commercial property).

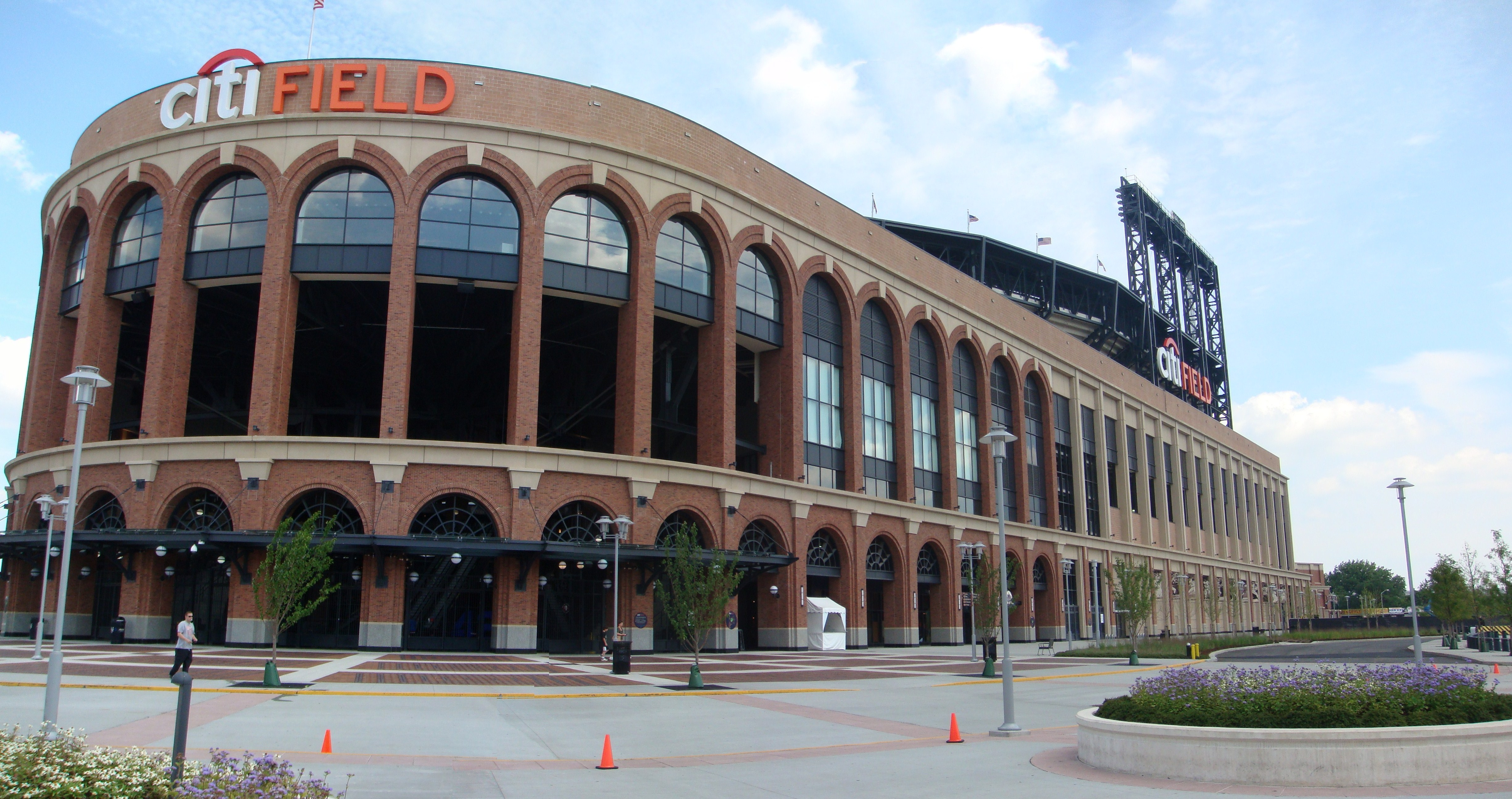
Citi Field

It was founded in 1972 by Fred Wilpon (Chairman) and Saul Katz (President), Wilpon's brother-in-law. It has developed a number of properties, including the tower at 450 Lexington Avenue. It built Citi Field $40 million under budget, and took over development of a Willets Point project.

== Madoff Ponzi Scheme ==
Sterling Equities was embroiled in the Bernie Madoff scandal. Madoff trustee Irving Picard alleged that the Sterling Equities had pocketed millions in fictitious profits. Sterling Equities had opened accounts with Bernard Madoff for themselves, their businesses, their friends and family, and business associates. Sterling was associated with 483 Madoff accounts. For example, Sterling Equities partner Greg Katz had 31 accounts with Madoff dating from 1992 and withdrew over $23 million in illegal profit. The Sterling Equities partners opened accounts for their wives and families. Valerie Wilpon, Amy Beth Katz, and Heath Katz Knopf all had accounts with Bernard Madoff. According to Picard, Sterling Equities used funds withdrawn from their wives’ accounts to meet their personal and/or business financial obligations.

Sterling Equities had a close personal relationship with Bernard Madoff. Madoff had Mets season tickets with seats near the owners box. Madoff and his wife, Ruth, traveled to Japan with the Wilpons and Katzes. Sterling assisted Madoff with securing office space in Manhattan's Lipstick Building. The Madoffs, Katzes, and Wilpons were involved in several charities together. They attended movies together and had houses close together in Florida.

By 2008, Sterling Equities had withdrawn approximately $300 million in fictitious profits. In 2012, Sterling Equities including Saul Katz, Greg Katz, Fred Wilpon and Jeff Wilpon settled a lawsuit by trustee Irving Picard that alleged that they had invested in Madoff's Ponzi scheme even though it knew the returns were fraudulent. Despite the allegations they were aware of Madoff's fraud and beneficiaries of it, Sterling asked the US Supreme Court to reverse a court decision and allow them access to a special fund set up for Madoff victims.

== See also ==
- List of investors in Bernard L. Madoff Investment Securities
- Participants in the Madoff investment scandal
