= Fred Wilpon =

American baseball team president

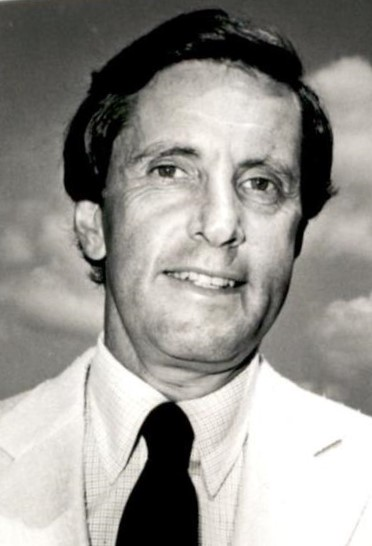
- Wilpon in 1982
- Born: November 22, 1936 (age 89); Brooklyn, New York City, U.S.
- Education: University of Michigan
- Occupations: Real estate developer, executive
- Known for: Co-founder of Sterling Equities; Former majority owner of the New York Mets
- Spouse: Judy Kessler
- Children: 3, including Jeff Wilpon
- Parent: Nathan Wilpon
- Relatives: Saul Katz (brother-in-law)

Fred Wilpon (born November 22, 1936) is an American real estate developer and former baseball executive. He was principal owner of the New York Mets from 1987 to 2020.

== Early life and education ==
Wilpon was raised in a Jewish family in Bensonhurst, Brooklyn. His father, Nathan Wilpon, managed a funeral home. Wilpon attended Lafayette High School in Brooklyn, where he was responsible for getting his friend, Sandy Koufax, to join the baseball team. Wilpon was a big fan of baseball and pitched his freshman year in college until he was injured. In 1958, he graduated with a B.A. from the University of Michigan. After college, he sold calculators for a time while his wife worked as a secretary for Branch Rickey, the former president of the Brooklyn Dodgers, whom he knew from the neighborhood.

== Career ==
In 1972, Wilpon cofounded Sterling Equities, a commercial real estate development company, with his brother-in-law Saul Katz. They built a development of townhouses in Tarrytown, a suburb in Westchester County which was very successful. Seeking to minimize their tax obligations, they purchased real estate throughout the country that had favorable tax treatment which turned out to be a boon since they were unknowingly buying property at the bottom of the market. He still serves as the company's chairman.

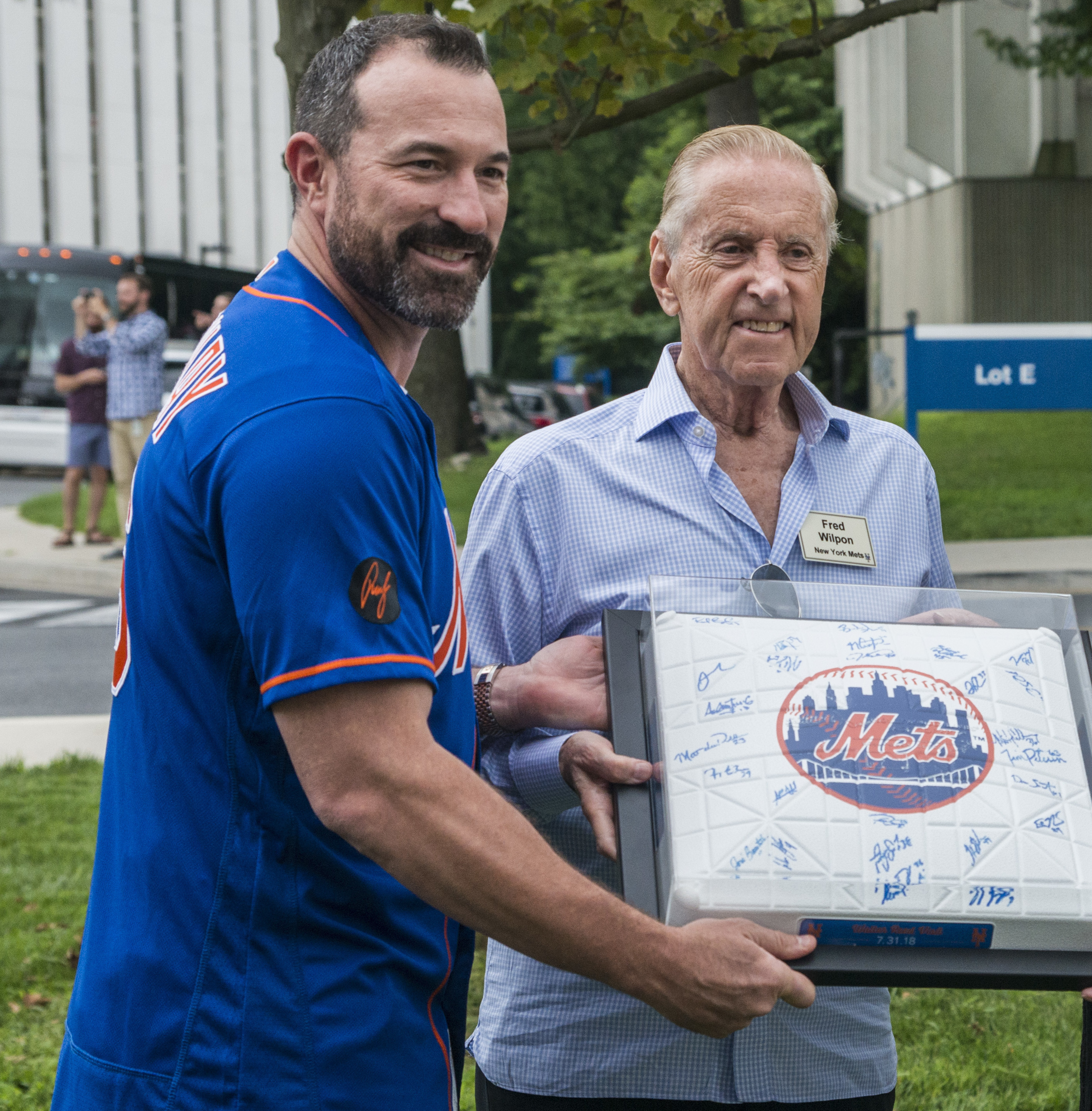
Wilpon (right) with New York Mets manager Mickey Callaway in 2018

In 1980, Wilpon bought a one-percent stake in the Mets when Charles Shipman Payson sold the team, with publishing company Doubleday & Co. holding the remaining interest. He gradually increased his stake to five percent. During the Mets championship season of 1986, Doubleday president Nelson Doubleday Jr. sold Doubleday & Co. to Bertelsmann AG. Wilpon had a right of first refusal in the event of a sale and threatened to exercise it. In the resulting settlement, Doubleday and Wilpon agreed to purchase the Mets for $81 million, with each holding a 50 percent stake. In 2002, the Wilpon family purchased the remaining 50% of the Mets from Doubleday for $391 million, giving Wilpon sole ownership of the Mets. Wilpon served as president of the team between 1980 and 2002, CEO from 1980 to 2020, and chairman of the board from 2002 to 2020. In September 2020, a deal was reached for billionaire hedge fund manager Steve Cohen to purchase 95% of the Mets from Wilpon, his son, C.O.O. Jeff Wilpon, and co-owner Saul Katz, for approximately $2.4 billion. On October 30, Cohen was approved by MLB's owners.

== Madoff investment scandal ==
Wilpon was one of the investors who invested a significant amount of money with Bernard Madoff which was lost when the Ponzi scheme collapsed in December 2008. It was reported that Wilpon had "lost" about $700 million because of Madoff, which led to speculation that would be forced to sell the team. Since then Wilpon has said that his losses were "substantially less" than that figure. Reports later surfaced that Wilpon and his family actually made about $300 million with Madoff and had not lost money as previously reported.

As a result, in December 2010, Wilpon was named in a lawsuit filed by Irving Picard on behalf of the victims of Madoff's investment scandal and on January 28, 2011 Wilpon issued a statement seeking "one or more strategic partners" interested in buying 20 to 25% interest in the Mets to offset pending losses due to litigation (which may total up to $1 billion). Wilpon and his partner and brother-in-law Saul Katz were involved in another Ponzi scheme which was orchestrated by Samuel Israel III and they were forced to pay $13 million to investors when Israel's hedge fund collapsed. It was revealed that Wilpon utilized Madoff in running the Mets' finances. It became a common practice to negotiate deferred money into players' contracts and then put that money with Madoff to invest because they were able to make money for themselves before paying players, most notably Bobby Bonilla. The lawsuit also contends that Madoff funds were used to cover team expenses such as payroll and its minor league club in Brooklyn, as well as financing the creation of the cable network SportsNet New York and Citi Field.

In an interview while in prison, Madoff claimed that Wilpon "knew nothing" about his Ponzi scheme. After it was reported that Major League Baseball loaned the Mets $25 million in November 2010 to shore up their finances, Wilpon was now willing to sell up to a 49% ownership stake of the team at a cost of $200 million. On May 26, 2011, it was reported that Wilpon has agreed to sell a minority share of the Mets to David Einhorn, president of the hedge fund Greenlight Capital, but ended negotiations on September 1. After the Mets received a $40 million loan from Bank of America in November 2011, Major League Baseball monitored the situation closely and was prepared to take control of the team from Wilpon if he defaulted on the loan. The trustee to the Madoff trust, Irving H. Picard, had declared that the Wilpons had enriched themselves over many years of profitable investing with Mr. Madoff while ignoring repeated warnings that he might have been a fraud. On March 19, 2012, Wilpon agreed to settle Picard's lawsuit for $162 million.

== Philanthropy ==
The Judy and Fred Wilpon Family Foundation donated $5 million to the University of Michigan's College of Literature, Science, and the Arts to establish the Irene and Morris B. Kessler Presidential Scholarship Fund named in honor of his wife's parents, Romanian immigrant and dentist, Morris Kessler, and Irene Nass. The Wilpons have also donated $5 million to create the University of Michigan Bone & Joint Injury Prevention & Rehabilitation Center, and $4 million for the Wilpon Baseball and Softball Complex.

== Personal life ==
Wilpon is married to Judy Kessler whom he met in college. She is a 1958 graduate of the University of Michigan. His daughter, Robin Wilpon, is married to Phillip Wachtler, son of former Chief Judge of the New York Court of Appeals, Sol Wachtler. His son Jeff Wilpon was the COO of the Mets until 2020 and is currently the executive vice-president of Sterling Equities. His son Bruce Wilpon is also a partner at Sterling Equities and was married to Yuki Oshima-Wilpon, daughter of Japanese billionaire Kenshin Ōshima. As a teenager Wilpon was a teammate of Baseball Hall of Famer Sandy Koufax on Brooklyn's Lafayette High School baseball team. Wilpon and Koufax remain close friends, with Koufax an annual visitor at the Mets' spring training facility in Port St. Lucie, Florida and Koufax being asked to testify at the Madoff trial.
