= Dynamics (music) =

Volume of a sound or note

The beginning of the principal theme to the third movement of Berlioz's Symphonie fantastique showing examples of pianissimo (pp) and hairpins

The dynamics of a piece of music is the variation in loudness between notes or phrases. Dynamics are indicated by specific musical notation, often in some detail. However, dynamics markings require interpretation by the performer depending on the musical context: a specific marking may correspond to a different volume between pieces or even sections of one piece. The execution of dynamics also extends beyond loudness to include changes in timbre and sometimes tempo rubato.

== Purpose and interpretation ==
Dynamics are one of the expressive elements of music. Used effectively, dynamics help musicians sustain variety and interest in a musical performance, and communicate a particular emotional state or feeling.

Dynamic markings are always relative. p (piano – "soft") never indicates a precise level of loudness; it merely indicates that music in a passage so marked should be considerably quieter than f (forte – "loud"). There are many factors affecting the interpretation of a dynamic marking. For instance, the middle of a musical phrase will normally be played louder than the beginning or end, to ensure the phrase is properly shaped, even where a passage is marked p throughout. Similarly, in multi-part music, some voices will naturally be played louder than others, for instance, to emphasize the melody and the bass line, even if a whole passage is marked at one dynamic level. Some instruments are naturally louder than others – for instance, a tuba playing mezzo piano will likely be louder than a guitar playing forte, while a high-pitched instrument like the piccolo playing in its upper register can sound loud even when its actual decibel level is lower than that of other instruments.

== Dynamic markings ==
Scale of dynamic markings
| Name | Letters | Level |
|---|---|---|
| fortississimo | fff | very very loud |
| fortissimo | ff | very loud |
| forte | f | loud |
| mezzo forte | mf | moderately loud |
| mezzo piano | mp | moderately quiet |
| piano | p | quiet |
| pianissimo | pp | very quiet |
| pianississimo | ppp | very very quiet |

The two basic dynamic indications in music are:

- p or piano, meaning "soft or quiet"
- f or forte, meaning "loud or strong"

More subtle degrees of loudness or softness are indicated by:

- mp, standing for mezzo piano, meaning "moderately quiet"
- mf, standing for mezzo forte, meaning "moderately loud"
- più p, standing for più piano and meaning "quieter"
- più f, standing for più forte and meaning "louder"

Use of up to four consecutive fs or three consecutive ps is also common:

- pp, standing for pianissimo and meaning "very quiet"
- ff, standing for fortissimo and meaning "very loud"
- ppp ("triple piano"), standing for pianississimo or piano pianissimo and meaning "very very quiet"
- fff ("triple forte"), standing for fortississimo or forte fortissimo and meaning "very very loud"
- ffff, standing for fortissississimo and meaning "as loud and strong as possible"

There are additional special markings that are not very common:

- sfz or sf, standing for sforzando and meaning "suddenly very loud", which only applies to a given beat
- rfz or rf, standing for rinforzando and meaning "reinforced", which refers to a sudden increase in volume that only applies to a given phrase
- n or ø, standing for niente and meaning "nothing", which refers to silence; generally used in combination with other markings for special effect

=== Changes ===
Three Italian words are used to show gradual changes in volume:

- crescendo (abbreviated cresc.) translates as "increasing" (lit. 'growing')
- decrescendo (abbreviated to decresc.) translates as "decreasing"
- diminuendo (abbreviated dim.) translates as "diminishing"

Decrescendo and diminuendo mean roughly the same thing.

Dynamic changes can be indicated by angled symbols. A crescendo symbol consists of two lines that open to the right; a decrescendo symbol starts open on the left and closes toward the right. These symbols are sometimes referred to as hairpins or wedges. The following notation indicates music starting moderately strong, then becoming gradually stronger and then gradually quieter:

Hairpins are typically positioned below the staff (or between the two staves in a grand staff), though they may appear above, especially in vocal music or when a single performer plays multiple melody lines. They denote dynamic changes over a short duration (up to a few bars), whereas cresc., decresc., and dim. signify more gradual changes. Word directions can be extended with dashes to indicate the temporal span of the change, which can extend across multiple pages. The term morendo ("dying") may also denote a gradual reduction in both dynamics and tempo.

For pronounced dynamic shifts, cresc. molto and dim. molto are commonly used, with molto meaning "much". Conversely, poco cresc. and poco dim. indicate gentler changes, with "poco" translating to a little, or alternatively poco a poco meaning "little by little".

Sudden dynamic changes are often indicated by prefixing or suffixing subito (meaning "suddenly") to the new dynamic notation. Subito piano (abbreviated as sub. p or p sub., "suddenly soft") implies a quick, almost abrupt reduction in volume to around the p range, often employed to subvert listener expectations, signaling a more intimate expression. Likewise, subito can mark sudden increases in volume, as in sub. f or f sub., "suddenly loud").

Accented notes are generally marked with an accent sign > placed above or below the note, emphasizing the attack relative to the prevailing dynamics. A sharper and briefer emphasis is denoted with a marcato mark ^ above the note. If a specific emphasis is required, variations of forzando/forzato, or fortepiano can be used.

forzando/forzato signifies a forceful accent, abbreviated as fz. To enhance the effect, subito often precedes it as sfz (subito forzato/forzando, sforzando/sforzato). The interpretation and execution of these markings are at the performer's discretion, with forzato/forzando typically seen as a variation of marcato and subito forzando/forzato as a marcato with added tenuto.

The fortepiano notation fp denotes a forte followed immediately by piano. But pf abbreviates poco forte, translating to "a little loud", but according to Brahms, implies a forte character with a piano sound, although rarely used due to potential confusion with pianoforte.

Messa di voce is a singing technique and musical ornament on a single pitch while executing a crescendo and diminuendo.

=== Extreme dynamic markings ===
Two measures of Sergei Rachmaninoff's Prelude in C♯ minor showing dynamic markings sffff. The top two staves are both played by the right hand, the bottom two by the left.

While the typical range of dynamic markings is from ppp to fff, some pieces use additional markings of further emphasis. Extreme dynamic markings imply either a very large dynamic range or very small differences of loudness within a normal range. This kind of usage is most common in orchestral works from the late 1800s onward. Generally, these markings are supported by the orchestration of the work, with heavy forte passages brought to life by having many loud instruments like brass and percussion playing at once.

- In Holst's The Planets, ffff occurs twice in "Mars" and once in "Uranus", often punctuated by organ.
- In Stravinsky's The Firebird Suite, ffff is marked for the strings and woodwinds at the end of the Finale.
- The baritone passage "Era la notte" from Verdi's opera Otello uses pppp, though the same spot is marked ppp in the full score.
- Tchaikovsky marks a bassoon solo pppppp (6 ps) in his Pathétique Symphony and uses ffff in passages of his 1812 Overture and his Fifth Symphony.
- In Charles-Valentin Alkan's Trois Grandes Études (Op. 76), ffff is used near the end of the first movement (for left hand alone).
- In Marc-André Hamelin's Cadenza to Liszt's Hungarian Rhapsody No. 2 (S. 244/2), ffff is used near the end (furiosissimo, prestissimo e secco).
- In Edvard Grieg's Piano Concerto (Op. 16), ffff is used several times in the cadenza at the end of the first movement.
- In Charles Edward Ives's Piano Sonata No. 2 (the Concord Sonata), pppp is used in the 4th movement (Thoreau) thrice.
- In Sylvano Bussoti's Five Piano Pieces for David Tudor, pppp, ppppp (5 ps), ffff and fffff (5 fs) are used several times throughout the piece.
- Sergei Rachmaninoff uses sffff twice in his Prelude in C♯ (Op. 3 No. 2).
- Heitor Villa-Lobos in his Rudepoêma uses rffff four times at the end of the piece, marked with à coup de poing (with fists).
- Kaikhosru Shapurji Sorabji in his Opus Clavicembalisticum uses ffff and sffffz at the end of the piece ("XII. Coda. Stretta").
- Gustav Mahler, in the third movement of his Seventh Symphony, gives the celli and basses a marking of fffff (5 fs), along with a footnote directing 'pluck so hard that the strings hit the wood'. (Note: So stark anreißen, daß die Saiten an das Holz anschlagen.)
- On the other extreme, Carl Nielsen, in the second movement of his Fifth Symphony, marked a passage for woodwinds a diminuendo to ppppp (5 ps).
- In Galina Ustvolskaya's Piano Sonata No. 6, ffff and fffff (5 fs) are used several times throughout the piece.
- Brian Ferneyhough, in his Lemma-Icon-Epigram, uses pppp, ppppp (5 ps), ffff , fffff (5 fs), ffffff (6 fs).
- Giuseppe Verdi, in Act II Scene 5 from his opera Otello, uses ppppppp (7 ps).
- György Ligeti: his Cello Concerto begins with a passage marked pppppppp (8 ps), in his Piano Études Étude No. 9 (Vertige) ends with a diminuendo to pppppppp (8 ps), while Étude No. 13 (L'Escalier du Diable) contains a passage marked ffffff (6 fs) that progresses to a ffffffff (8 fs) and his opera Le Grand Macabre has ffffffffff (10 fs) with a stroke of the hammer.

== History ==
On Music, one of the Moralia attributed to the philosopher Plutarch in the first century AD, suggests that ancient Greek musical performance included dynamic transitions – though dynamics receive far less attention in the text than does rhythm or harmony.

The Renaissance composer Giovanni Gabrieli was one of the first to indicate dynamics in music notation. However, much of the use of dynamics in early Baroque music remained implicit and was achieved through a practice called raddoppio ("doubling") and later ripieno ("filling"), which consisted of creating a contrast between a small number of elements and then a larger number of elements (usually in a ratio of 2:1 or more) to increase the mass of sound. This practice was pivotal to the structuring of instrumental forms such as the concerto grosso and the solo concerto, where a few or one instrument, supported by harmonic basso continuo instruments (organ, lute, theorbo, harpsichord, lirone, and low register strings, such as cello or viola da gamba, often used together) variously alternate or join to create greater contrasts. This practice is usually called terraced dynamics, i.e. the alternation of piano and forte.

Later baroque musicians, such as Antonio Vivaldi, tended to use more varied dynamics. J.S. Bach used some dynamic terms, including forte, piano, più piano, and pianissimo (although written out as full words), and in some cases it may be that ppp was considered to mean pianissimo in this period. In 1752, Johann Joachim Quantz wrote that "Light and shade must be constantly introduced ... by the incessant interchange of loud and soft." In addition to this, the harpsichord in fact becomes louder or softer depending on the thickness of the musical texture (four notes are louder than two).

In the Romantic period, composers greatly expanded the vocabulary for describing dynamic changes in their scores. Where Haydn and Mozart specified six levels (pp to ff), Beethoven used also ppp and fff (the latter less frequently), and Brahms used a range of terms to describe the dynamics he wanted. In the slow movement of Brahms's trio for violin, horn and piano (Opus 40), he uses the expressions ppp, molto piano, and quasi niente to express different qualities of quiet. Many Romantic and later composers added più p and più f, making for a total of ten levels between ppp and fff.

An example of how effective contrasting dynamics can be may be found in the overture to Smetana’s opera The Bartered Bride. The fast scurrying quavers played pianissimo by the second violins form a sharply differentiated background to the incisive thematic statement played fortissimo by the firsts.

Smetana Bartered Bride overture, bars 30–36

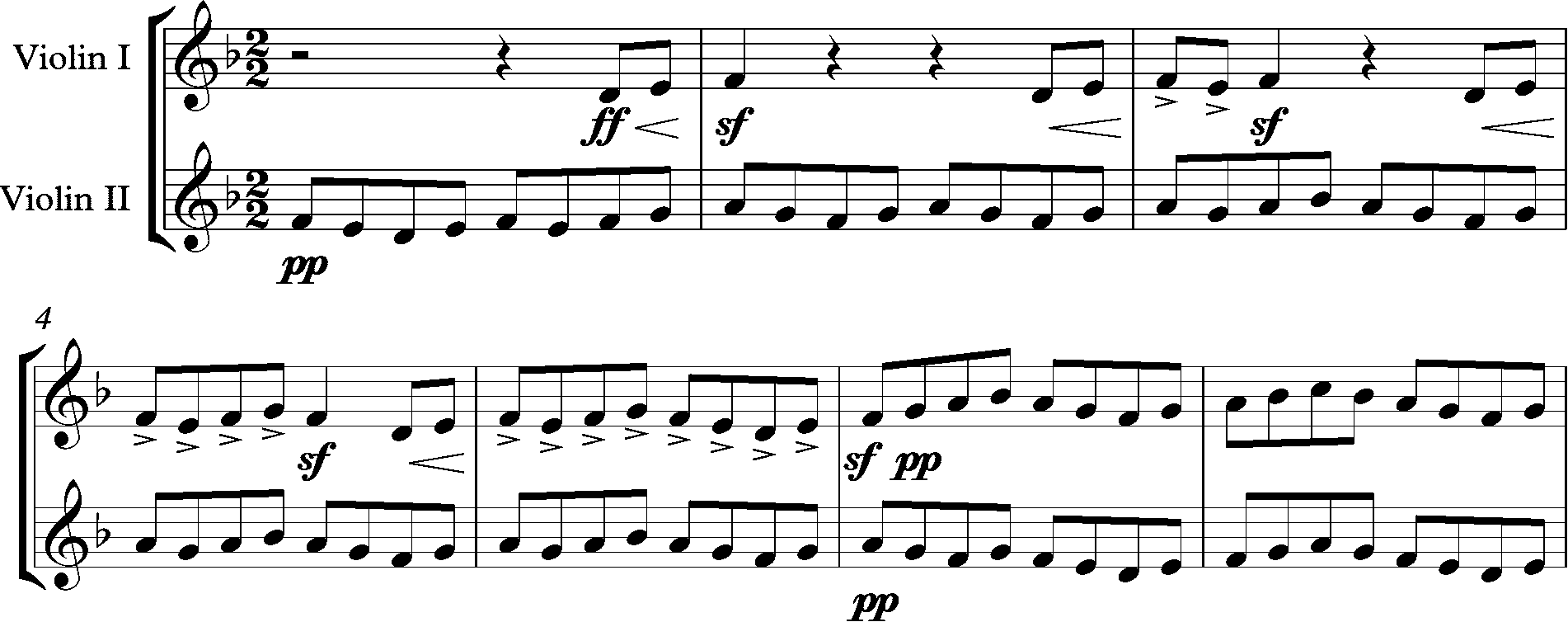
Smetana Bartered Bride overture, bars 30–36

== Interpretation by notation programs ==
Note Velocity is a MIDI measurement of the speed that the key travels from its rest position to completely depressed, with 127, the largest value in a 7-bit number, being instantaneous, and meaning as strong as possible.

In some music notation programs, there are default MIDI key velocity values associated with these indications, but more sophisticated programs allow users to change these as needed. These defaults are listed in the following table for some applications, including Apple's Logic Pro 9 (2009–2013), Avid's Sibelius 5 (2007–2009), musescore.org's MuseScore 3.0 (2019), MakeMusic's Finale 26 (2018–2021), and Musitek's SmartScore X2 Pro (2016) and 64 Pro. (2021). MIDI specifies the range of key velocities as an integer between 0 and 127:

| Symbols | ppppp | pppp | ppp | pp | p | mp | mf | f | ff | fff | ffff |
|---|---|---|---|---|---|---|---|---|---|---|---|
| Logic Pro 9 dynamics | | | 16 | 32 | 48 | 64 | 80 | 96 | 112 | 127 | |
| Sibelius 5 dynamics | | | 20 | 39 | 61 | 71 | 84 | 98 | 113 | 127 | |
| MuseScore 3.0 dynamics | 5 | 10 | 16 | 33 | 49 | 64 | 80 | 96 | 112 | 126 | 127 |
| MakeMusic Finale dynamics | | 10 | 23 | 36 | 49 | 62 | 75 | 88 | 101 | 114 | 127 |
| SmartScore X2 dynamics | | 29 | 38 | 46 | 55 | 63 | 72 | 80 | 89 | 97 | 106 |
| SmartScore 64 dynamics | | 30 | 40 | 50 | 60 | 70 | 80 | 90 | 100 | 110 | 120 |

The velocity effect on volume depends on the particular instrument. For instance, a grand piano has a much greater volume range than a recorder.

== Relation to audio dynamics ==
The introduction of modern recording techniques has provided alternative ways to control the dynamics of music. Dynamic range compression is used to control the dynamic range of a recording, or a single instrument. This can affect loudness variations, both at the micro- and macro scale. In many contexts, the meaning of the term dynamics is therefore not immediately clear. To distinguish between the different aspects of dynamics, the term performed dynamics can be used to refer to the aspects of music dynamics controlled exclusively by the performer.

== See also ==
- Accent (music)
- Articulation (music)
- Glossary of musical terminology
