= Broken Arrow High School =

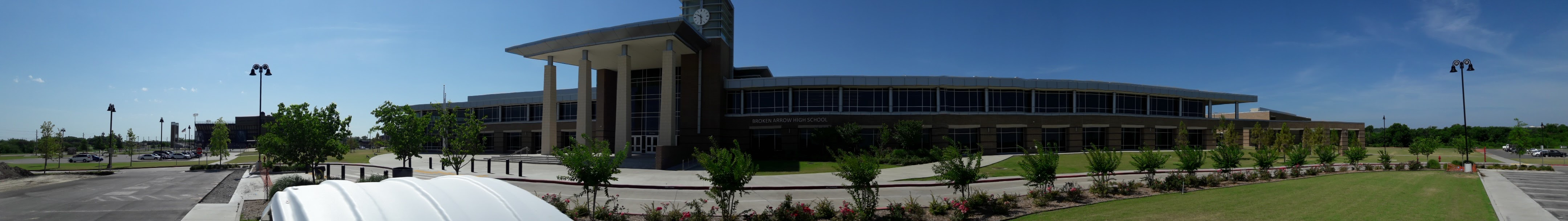

Location
- 1901 East Albany Street; Broken Arrow, Oklahoma 74012; United States; 36°04′23″N 95°45′56″W

Information
- Type: Public school
- Established: 1910
- Locale: Suburban
- Executive principal: Kristy Smith
- Teaching staff: 239.38 (FTE)
- Enrollment: 4,672 (2023-2024)
- Student to teacher ratio: 19.52
- Colors: Black & Gold
- Mascot: Tiger
- District: Broken Arrow Public Schools
- Website: Official website

Broken Arrow High School is the highest level of secondary education in the Broken Arrow Public Schools system, for students in tenth through twelfth grade. Combined with the Broken Arrow Freshman Academy, it is the largest high school in the state of Oklahoma. Its current principal is Kristy Smith.

== History ==
The first high-school level education in Broken Arrow happened in fall 1910 with the formation of Broken Arrow Public Schools. A new building was built in 1952, and the current campus opened in its original format in 1982. A new football stadium was opened in 2000, replacing one used since 1930.

An approved $295 million bond in 2009 resulted in the building of a new indoor training facility for the football team, as well as other groups receiving upgrades to their facilities. A new science wing opened in October 2017.

A 2017 plan to split BAHS into two high schools by 2021 was scrapped for a plan that focused more on career preparation.

== Extracurricular activities ==
=== Athletics ===
Broken Arrow Tigers athletic logo

The following is a list of the state championships won by BAHS:

- Baseball - 2 (1991, 2011)
- Boys basketball - 1 (1997)
- Girls basketball - 3 (1983, 2014, 2015)
- Cheerleading - 7 (1999, 2012, 2013, 2014, 2015, 2016, 2022)
- Boys cross country - 2 (1971, 2009)
- Football - 1 (2018)
- Boys golf - 1 (2025)
- Girls golf - 2 (1985, 1986)
- Boys soccer - 5 (2001, 2002, 2011, 2017, 2021)
- Girls soccer - 7 (1985, 1986, 1987, 1989, 1994, 1998, 2018)
- Fastpitch softball - 11 (1979, 1985, 1989, 1996, 1998, 2001, 2002, 2003, 2006, 2008, 2009)
- Slowpitch softball - 1 (2015)
- Boys track and field - 2 (2013, 2019)
- Girls track and field - 1 (2004)
- Volleyball - 1 (1993)
- Wrestling - 20 (Team state: 1998, 1999, 2000, 2001, 2002, 2010, 2011, 2012, 2015, 2019, 2020) (Dual state: 1998, 1999, 2000, 2002, 2008, 2011, 2014, 2019, 2020)
- Girls wrestling - 1 (2021)

=== Fine arts ===
Broken Arrow's competitive marching band, the Pride of Broken Arrow, was the 2006, 2011, 2015, and 2021 Bands of America Grand Nationals champion. With their 2021 Grand National Finals performance, they achieved the record for the highest BOA score of all time, with a 98.25. As of 2021, the Pride has won 19 consecutive Oklahoma Bandmasters Association State Marching Championships. The Pride is the only 3-time winner of the Sudler Shield, awarded by the John Philip Sousa Foundation, winning it in 1999, 2008, and 2015. The group was also the subject of the independent film The Pride of Broken Arrow, which chronicled the 2001 season.

The Broken Arrow indoor percussion ensemble was founded in 2014, and won a national championship in 2016.

BAHS has two competitive show choirs, the mixed voice "Tiger Rhythm" and the treble "Tiger Mystique". Tiger Rhythm has won championships in Texas, Missouri and Nebraska.

== Notable alumni ==
=== Athletics ===
- David Alexander, class of 1982, football player and coach
- Alvin Bailey, class of 2009, football player
- Jim Baumer, class of 1949, baseball player and manager
- Archie Bradley, class of 2011, baseball player
- Jim Brewer, class of 1955, baseball player
- DeDe Dorsey, class of 2002, football player
- Steve Logan, class of 1970, football player and coach
- Brad Penny, class of 1996, baseball player
- Andrew Raym, class of 2020, college football player
- Robert Spears-Jennings, class of 2022, college football player
- Andy Wilkins, class of 2007, baseball player
- Jackson Williams, class of 2004, baseball player
- Matt Wiman, class of 2002, fighter and martial artist

=== Performing arts ===
- Kristen Cast, class of 2005, author
- Kristin Chenoweth, class of 1986, actress and soprano
- John Moreland, an American singer-songwriter
- Kathryn Zaremba, class of 2002, actress.

=== Politics ===
- Joe Newhouse, an American politician who has served in the Oklahoma Senate from the 25th district since 2016.
