= Andrew Raym =

American football player (born 2001)

No. 60 – Rhode Island Breakers
- Position: Center
- Roster status: Active

Personal information
- Born: May 2, 2001 (age 25); Broken Arrow, Oklahoma, U.S.
- Listed height: 6 ft 4 in (1.93 m)
- Listed weight: 327 lb (148 kg)

Career information
- High school: Broken Arrow
- College: Oklahoma (2020–2023)
- NFL draft: 2024: undrafted

Career history
- Carolina Panthers (2024); Cincinnati Bengals (2025)*; Birmingham Stallions (2026); Rhode Island Breakers (2027–present)
- * Offseason or practice squad member only

Awards and highlights
- 2x Second-team All-Big 12 (2021, 2023)
- Stats at Pro Football Reference

Andrew Raym (born May 2, 2001) is an American professional football center for the Rhode Island Breakers of the United Football League (UFL). He played college football for the Oklahoma Sooners and was signed as an undrafted free agent by the Carolina Panthers in 2024.

== Early life ==
Raym grew up in Broken Arrow, Oklahoma, and attended Broken Arrow High School. He quickly became a top offensive line recruit after becoming a full-time starter as a freshman in 2016. By his sophomore year he had become a first-team all-state selection and All-American. He helped the school win their first state championship as a junior and as a senior helped them set school rushing records. An Under Armour All-American, he was ranked the consensus top recruit in the state and the number one offensive guard nationally. He committed to play college football for the Oklahoma Sooners.

== College career ==
As a true freshman at Oklahoma in 2020, Raym appeared in nine games, being mostly a special teams player but also seeing action on 61 offensive plays. He then appeared in 12 games, seven as a starter at center, for the team in 2021, being named second-team All-Big 12 Conference. He started 10 games and was named honorable mention All-Big 12 in the 2022 season. Raym remained a starter in 2023 and was selected second-team all-conference for the second time. He accepted an invite to the 2024 Senior Bowl and declared for the 2024 NFL draft, finishing his collegiate career with 29 starts.

== Professional career ==
Pre-draft measurables
Height	Weight	Arm length	Hand span	40-yard dash	10-yard split	20-yard split	Vertical jump	Broad jump
6 ft 4 in (1.93 m)	314 lb (142 kg)	32 1/2 in (0.83 m)	10 in (0.25 m)	5.42 s	1.94 s	3.17 s	24.5 in (0.62 m)	7 ft 11 in (2.41 m)
All values from NFL Combine

=== Carolina Panthers ===
Raym signed with the Carolina Panthers as an undrafted free agent on May 10, 2024. He was also selected by the Memphis Showboats in the sixth round of the 2024 UFL draft on July 17. Raym notably made the Panthers' 53 man roster out of training camp as a UDFA. He was waived on October 19, and re-signed to the practice squad.

Raym signed a reserve/future contract with Carolina on January 6, 2025. On May 8, Raym was waived by the Panthers.

=== Cincinnati Bengals ===
On July 20, 2025, Raym signed with the Cincinnati Bengals. He was waived on August 25.

=== Birmingham Stallions ===
On January 14, 2026, Raym was selected by the Birmingham Stallions of the United Football League (UFL). He was released on May 20.
