= Roulette (disambiguation) =

Roulette is a popular game of chance in casinos.

Roulette may also refer to:

== Places ==
- Roulette, Pennsylvania
- Roulette Township, Pennsylvania, in the United States

== Films ==
- Roulette (2011 film), an American independent film
- Roulette (1924 film), an American silent drama film

== Music ==
- Roulette Records, a label under Warner Music Group
- The Roulettes, English rock band
- Roulette (album), a 2013 album by Blue
- "Roulette" (instrumental), an instrumental that was a UK number-one hit for Russ Conway in 1959
- "Roulette", a song by Bon Jovi from their 1984 debut album Bon Jovi
- "Roulette", a song by Brotherhood of Man from the 1978 album B for Brotherhood
- "Roulette", a song by Bruce Springsteen on the album Tracks
- "Roulette", a song by Katy Perry from the 2017 album Witness
- "Roulette", a song by Machine Gun Kelly from his album Hotel Diablo
- "Roulette", a song by System of a Down from the album Steal This Album!
- "Roulette", a song by Red Hot Chili Peppers from the album Return of the Dream Canteen

== Other uses ==
- Roulette (comics), Marvel Comics character and DC character
- Roulette (curve), a kind of curve used in differential geometry
- Roulette, a small cut used for paper separation, see Postage stamp separation
- Roulette or Marseille Roulette, a French term for an association football trick otherwise called the Marseille turn
- Roulette Intermedium, an arts organization and performing arts venue in Brooklyn, New York
- Roulettes, Royal Australian Air Force formation aerobatic display team
- Russian roulette (Russkaya ruletka), an analogy for or the actual lethal game of chance in which a player places a single round in a revolver, spins the cylinder, places the muzzle against his or her head, and pulls the trigger

== See also ==
- Roulet, a surname
