= Plaine & Easie Code =

Standardized notation system for music notes

The Plaine & Easie Code is an open international library standard that enables entering music incipits.

The code format standard uses ordinary ASCII symbols and is maintained by the International Association of Music Libraries, Archives and Documentation Centres and the Répertoire International des Sources Musicales. It supports modern and mensural notation and aims to be an exchange format in the library environment. It is used within the MARC standards to encode musical incipits.

The music notation software Verovio renders Plaine & Easie Code and converts it to the MEI and MIDI file formats.
