= Ernest Childers =

Native American U.S. Army officer, Medal of Honor recipient (1918-2005)

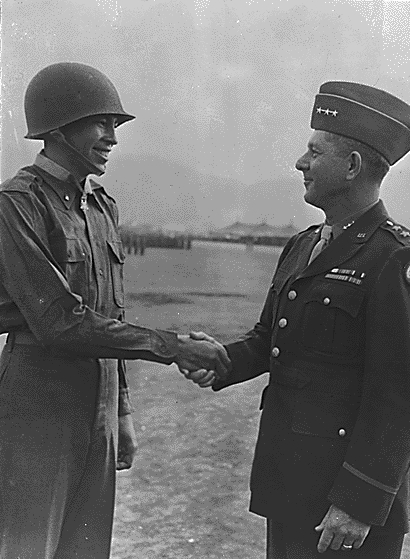
- Childers, at left, with General Jacob L. Devers shortly after receiving the Medal of Honor
- Born: February 1, 1918; Broken Arrow, Oklahoma, US
- Died: March 17, 2005 (aged 87)
- Military career
- Allegiance: United States
- Branch: United States Army
- Service years: 1937–1966
- Rank: Lieutenant Colonel
- Units: 180th Infantry Regiment, 45th Infantry Division
- Conflicts: World War II: Italian Campaign
- Awards: Medal of Honor

Ernest Childers (February 1, 1918 – March 17, 2005) was a United States Army officer and a recipient of the United States military's highest decoration, the Medal of Honor, for his valorous actions in World War II.

== Biography ==
Childers was born in Broken Arrow, Oklahoma, on February 1, 1918. A Muscogee (Creek) Indian, he graduated from the Chilocco Indian Agricultural School in north-central Oklahoma. Coincidentally, Jack C. Montgomery, who also earned the Medal of Honor in World War II for service in Italy, graduated from the same school.

In 1937, Childers joined the Oklahoma Army National Guard and was assigned to the 180th Infantry Regiment, 45th Infantry Division. After the U.S. entry into World War II, he was sent to Europe and in August, 1943, he received a battlefield promotion to second lieutenant serving with 45th Infantry Division, 180th Infantry Regiment, in Italy. On that day, at Oliveto, he single-handedly killed two enemy snipers, attacked two machine gun nests, and captured an artillery observer. For these actions, he was awarded the Medal of Honor seven months later, on April 8, 1944. He was the first Native American to earn the medal since the Indian Wars of the 19th century.

Childers reached the rank of lieutenant colonel before retiring from the Army.

Before his death, a middle school was named in his honor, Ernest Childers Middle School, which is a part of Broken Arrow Public Schools and services grades 6th through 8th grade. The Department of Veterans Affairs Community-Based Outpatient Clinic in Tulsa, Oklahoma is named in his honor, the Ernest Childers Outpatient Clinic.

== Medal of Honor citation ==
Childers' was recovering from wounds in Naples when he was presented with the official Medal of Honor by General Jacob Devers. The citation reads:

For conspicuous gallantry and intrepidity at risk of life above and beyond the call of duty in action on 22 September 1943, at Oliveto, Italy. Although 2d Lt. Childers previously had just suffered a fractured instep he, with 8 enlisted men, advanced up a hill toward enemy machinegun nests. The group advanced to a rock wall overlooking a cornfield and 2d Lt. Childers ordered a base of fire laid across the field so that he could advance. When he was fired upon by 2 enemy snipers from a nearby house he killed both of them. He moved behind the machinegun nests and killed all occupants of the nearer one. He continued toward the second one and threw rocks into it. When the 2 occupants of the nest raised up, he shot 1. The other was killed by 1 of the 8 enlisted men. 2d Lt. Childers continued his advance toward a house farther up the hill and, single-handed, captured an enemy mortar observer. The exceptional leadership, initiative, calmness under fire and conspicuous gallantry displayed by 2d Lt. Childers were an inspiration to his men.

== Awards and decorations ==

Badge	Combat Infantryman Badge		
1st row	Medal of Honor		Bronze Star Medal
2nd row	Purple Heart	Army Commendation Medal	Army Good Conduct Medal
3rd row	American Defense Service Medal	American Campaign Medal	European–African–Middle Eastern Campaign Medal with 4 Campaign stars
4th row	World War II Victory Medal	Army of Occupation Medal with 'Germany' clasp	National Defense Service Medal with 1 Oak leaf cluster
Unit awards	Presidential Unit Citation		

== See also ==
- List of Native American Medal of Honor recipients
- List of Medal of Honor recipients for World War II
