= Haskell State School of Agriculture =

- U.S. National Register of Historic Places
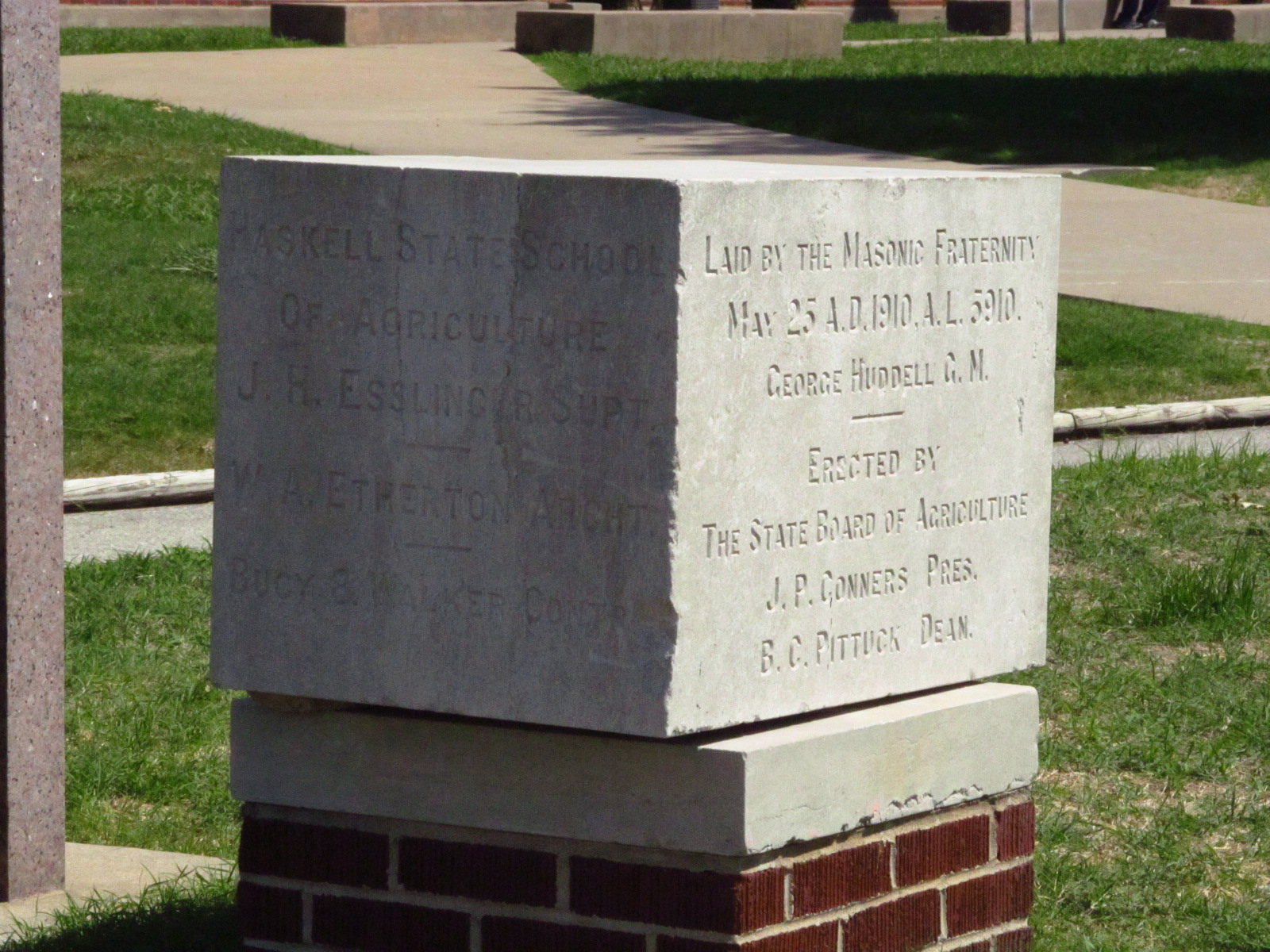
- Cornerstone of the Haskell State School of Agriculture in 2012
- Location: 808 E College
- Built: 1910
- Architect: W. A. Etherton
- Demolished: 1989
- NRHP reference No.: 78002268
- Added to NRHP: December 19, 1978

The Haskell State School of Agriculture was a public college formerly operational in Broken Arrow, Oklahoma. The college opened in 1909 with the building completing construction in 1910. The college closed in 1917 when the Oklahoma Legislature cut its funding.

The college's building was used as Broken Arrow's high school from its closure until 1948, as the junior high from 1948 to 1958, and finally as Broken Arrow Public Schools fine arts building from 1958 until its closure. It was listed on the National Register of Historic Places in 1978 and was demolished in 1989.

== Founding and college years ==
The Haskell State School of Agriculture was created by the 1st Oklahoma Legislature and named after the first Governor of Oklahoma, Charles N. Haskell. Classes opened on November 15, 1909. In 1917, the Oklahoma Legislature cut the college's funding.

== Broken Arrow Public Schools, national registry listing, and demolition ==
After the college closed, the building was given to Broken Arrow Public Schools. The school district used the building as a high school from 1917 to 1948, a junior high from 1948 to 1958, and finally as its fine arts building until its closure. The building was listed on the National Register of Historic Places on December 19, 1978. It was demolished in 1989.
