= Notation Interchange File Format =

Notation Interchange File Format (NIFF) is a music notation file format used primarily for transferring music notation between different scorewriters. The specification was released in August 1995, enabling an exchange of music between various scanning / Optical music recognition, editing and typesetting programs.

The NIFF format itself is based upon RIFF (Resource Interchange File Format), a file structure provided by Microsoft, in which binary-encoded data is divided into Lists, Chunks and Tags. Almost all data in a NIFF file are optional. The level of detail contained can range from just the pitch and timing (akin to MIDI) to a precise page layout, embedded graphics and embedded MIDI information.

Though detailed and comprehensive, the standard never really caught on except for limited interchange between Optical music recognition software and score writing software. Three of the Optical music recognition programs in widespread use – PhotoScore, SharpEye, and SmartScore – export NIFF files. NIFF is now considered obsolete mainly due to the MusicXML format. As of February 2006 the NIFF project web site has been closed. The NIFF SDK is available at The NIFF SDK Archive for educational usage.
