= Fortepiano (musical dynamic) =

Dynamic change in a musical score

The fortepiano dynamic as it appears in modern music

The expression fortepiano (sometimes called forte piano) is a sudden dynamic change used in a musical score, usually with the abbreviation fp, to designate a section of music in which the music should be played loudly (forte), then immediately softly (piano). It is not unusual for it to be followed by a crescendo, a gradual increase in dynamics. The word is of Italian etymology literally translated as 'loudsoft'.

== Examples ==
Beethoven's Piano Sonata No. 8 begins with a fortepiano:

Grave introduction: first four bars
