= Roulette (comics) =

Roulette, in comics, may refer to:

- Roulette (Marvel Comics), a Marvel Comics character who is a member of the Hellions
- Roulette (DC Comics), a female DC Comics character who runs a metahuman fighting place called The House

== See also ==
- Roulette (disambiguation)
