= Music Encoding Initiative =

The Music Encoding Initiative (MEI) is an open-source effort to create a system for representation of musical documents in a machine-readable structure. MEI closely mirrors work done by text scholars in the Text Encoding Initiative (TEI) and while the two encoding initiatives are not formally related, they share many common characteristics and development practices. The term "MEI", like "TEI", describes the governing organization and the markup language. The MEI community solicits input and development directions from specialists in various music research communities, including technologists, librarians, historians, and theorists in a common effort to discuss and define best practices for representing a broad range of musical documents and structures. The results of these discussions are then formalized into the MEI schema, a core set of rules for recording physical and intellectual characteristics of music notation documents. This schema is expressed in an XML schema Language, with RelaxNG being the preferred format. The MEI schema is developed using the One-Document-Does-it-all (ODD) format, a literate programming XML format developed by the Text Encoding Initiative.

MEI is often used for music metadata catalogs, critical editing (particularly of early music), and OMR-based data collection and interchange.

MEI uses permissive software licence; the Educational Community License, Version 2.0, (related to the Apache license, 2.0).

Verovio is a portable, lightweight library for rendering Music Encoding Initiative (MEI) files by transformation into Scalable Vector Graphics format, released under the LGPLv3 license.

== See also ==
- Music Markup Language
- Notation Interchange File Format (NIFF)
- MusicXML
