= OpenOMR =

Open source tool for optical music recognition

- Developer: Arnaud Desaedeleer
- Stable release: pre-alpha / April 10, 2013; 12 years ago
- Operating system: Linux, Windows, Mac OS
- Type: Optical music recognition
- License: GPL (free software)
- Website: sourceforge.net/projects/openomr

OpenOMR is a pre-alpha open source optical music recognition (OMR) tool written in Java for printed music scores. It allows a user to scan printed sheet music and play it through the computer speakers. It is being published as free software under the terms of the GNU General Public License (GPL).
