= Phil Farrand =

American computer programmer and consultant, webmaster and author

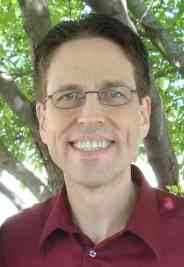
- Born: November 5, 1958 (age 67); Broken Arrow, Oklahoma
- Occupations: Novelist, Non-fiction writer
- Spouse: Lynette Farrand
- Children: Elizabeth Farrand
- Writing career
- Genres: Science fiction, Children's literature, Non-fiction
- Website: philfarrand.com

Phil Farrand (born November 5, 1958) is an American computer programmer and consultant, webmaster and author. He is known for his Nitpicker's Guides, in which he nitpicks plot holes and continuity errors in the various Star Trek television programs and movies, and for the creation of Nitcentral, a website devoted to the same activity. Subsequent to his Nitpicker's Guides, he has ventured into fiction as a novelist, and on Fridays and Saturdays mornings, starting just after Covid, to make people smile, makes and wears calendar inspired costumes to his nearest Walmart, restaurants, and other businesses.

== Early life ==
Farrand was born in Broken Arrow, Oklahoma, and grew up in the Philippines, where his parents were missionaries for Assemblies of God. He first became interested in the original Star Trek as a child. After returning to the United States, Farrand earned bachelor's degrees in piano performance and music composition.

== Career ==
=== Music ===
Farrand worked as a music editor, but became frustrated with working with music printed on paper, and worked for two years on a notation package for the Apple II, which later became Polywriter. Later, working with Coda Music Technology, Farrand created an award-winning, high-end desktop publishing software package for music notation called Finale. Later owned by MakeMusic, and now discontinued, Finale won Best Book/Video/Software at the 2015 Music & Sound Awards and was used to score films such as Million Dollar Baby, The Aviator, Spider-Man 2, Sideways, Harry Potter and the Prisoner of Azkaban, The Passion of the Christ, Ratatouille, and Michael Clayton.

=== As a nitpicker ===
Farrand first became a Star Trek nitpicker when watching a scene in the 1990 Star Trek: The Next Generation episode The Offspring. In the scene, the character Wesley Crusher speaks to his mother, Dr. Beverly Crusher using his communicator badge. After responding to Dr. Crusher's reminder to get a haircut, Wesley utters a sarcastic remark, but without tapping his comm badge to terminate the connection, leading Farrand to wonder if Dr. Crusher heard the remark. This sparked a spirited discussion between Farrand and his Trekker friend as to how the communicators worked, and the inconsistencies in their depicted usage in the series.

In 1990, Farrand decided to try writing fiction, but could not find anyone to read his work. Because the only agent willing to represent him dealt only with nonfiction works, Farrand decided to attempt writing nonfiction in order to develop a reputation on which a career writing fiction could be based. A book producer liked Farrand's idea for a Next Generation nitpicker's guide, and so Farrand spent two years conducting careful analysis of the first six seasons of that series, spending eight to nine hours a day for months watching each episode multiple times, composing a tongue-in-cheek analysis of the plot holes, continuity errors and other trivia in the series. In 1993 Dell Publishing published the first guide, The Nitpicker's Guide for Next Generation Trekkers. By 1994 nearly 800,000 copies had been sold, and four printings published. From 1994 to 1997, similar guides followed annually, including Guides for Star Trek: The Original Series, Star Trek: Deep Space Nine and The X-Files, along with a second Next Generation volume. Watching the episodes and movies of each series in order to compile each Guide took about seven months, leaving Farrand five months out of the year to learn how to write fiction. Although exhaustive in their attention to detail, the Guides were not intended as critiques of the series' episodes or movies, but lighthearted musings that Farrand explained with the philosophy, "All nitpickers shall perform their duties with lightheartedness and good cheer," explaining that nitpicking should be about having fun with one's favorite television shows, not pointing fingers and assigning blame.

Farrand solicited submissions from readers, who then became members of the "Nitpicker's Guild." He began sending out newsletters in 1994 in order to keep in touch with the Guild, beginning with the April 1994 edition. The Guild numbered 7,450 members from 32 countries as of May 28, 1999. Farrand decided to create an online version of the newsletter called Nitpicker Central, or Nitcentral; this took the form of an HTML feature called "This Week at Nitcentral", and debuted in November 1997. The hardcopy version of the newsletter also continued, with a total of 17 issues published intermittently, ceasing with issue dated October 1998, which coincided with the creation of Nitcentral's message boards, using free Discus software. Farrand was Nitcentral's first and sole moderator at first, with the site covering only four topics, the live action Star Trek television programs that had been produced up to then: Star Trek: The Original Series, Star Trek: The Next Generation, Star Trek: Deep Space Nine, and Star Trek: Voyager. By June 2009, the topics listed on the main Topics page numbered 89.

Farrand planned to release a Nitpicker's Guide for Star Wars in April 1999, one month before Star Wars: Episode I – The Phantom Menace, but publishers became wary of publishing media tie-in products as a result copyright infringement lawsuits brought against similar products. Although the lawsuits did not name Farrand's Guides as an example — and in fact, even cited the Guides used as an example of what was legal — Del Rey ceased publishing Farrand's Guides, leaving Nitcentral as the sole ongoing outlet for the Guild. As the site expanded, Farrand assigned dozens of moderators to oversee the site's various topics.

=== As a novelist ===
Farrand's initial attempts to publish through a small publisher in August 2003 were not fruitful, and he ultimately decided to self-publish through on-demand publisher Xlibris. His novel The Son, the Wind and the Reign was published in 2004. It depicts a world in which Jesus Christ and his followers have returned to Earth to rule with an iron rod for a thousand years. Twenty years into the new rule, a resistance fighter named Avery Foster decides to confront the new rulers, including Judge Thomas Stone, whose brutal interpretations of the new law have oppressed anyone daring to rebel. Farrand wrote the novel in part to explore the question of how one can distinguish between the divine and extraterrestrials, and added a topic to Nitcentral for discussion of the novel.

In 2007, Farrand published Grumpy Old Prophets: A Christmas Fable for Adults. He also began a new Internet provider venture called Zarks, providing high-speed Internet access to the rural areas in and around Greene County, Missouri.

== Personal life ==
Farrand lives with his wife Lynette in Springfield, Missouri.

== Books ==
=== Nitpicker's Guides ===
- The Nitpicker's Guide for Next Generation Trekkers (1993)
- The Nitpicker's Guide for Classic Trekkers (1994)
- The Nitpicker's Guide for Next Generation Trekkers, Volume II (1995)
- Nitpicker's Fun & Games for Next Generation Trekkers (1995)
- The Nitpicker's Guide for Deep Space Nine Trekkers (1996)
- The Nitpicker's Guide for X-Philes (1997)

==== On audio cassette ====
- The Nitpicker's Guide for Next Generation Trekkers Part 3

=== Fiction ===
- The Son, the Wind and the Reign
- Grumpy Old Prophets: A Christmas Fable for Adults
- Windfall: The 99 and 1: The Conviction Opus, Part One (2014)
- Windfall: Broadcast: The Conviction Opus, Part Two (2015)
- Windfall: The Strait Gate: The Conviction Opus, Part Three (2015)

=== Non-fiction ===
- Still Whispers: Meditations To Help You Calm The Atmosphere Of Your Life And Find Abundance (2008)
