= Alvin Bailey =

American football player (born 1990)

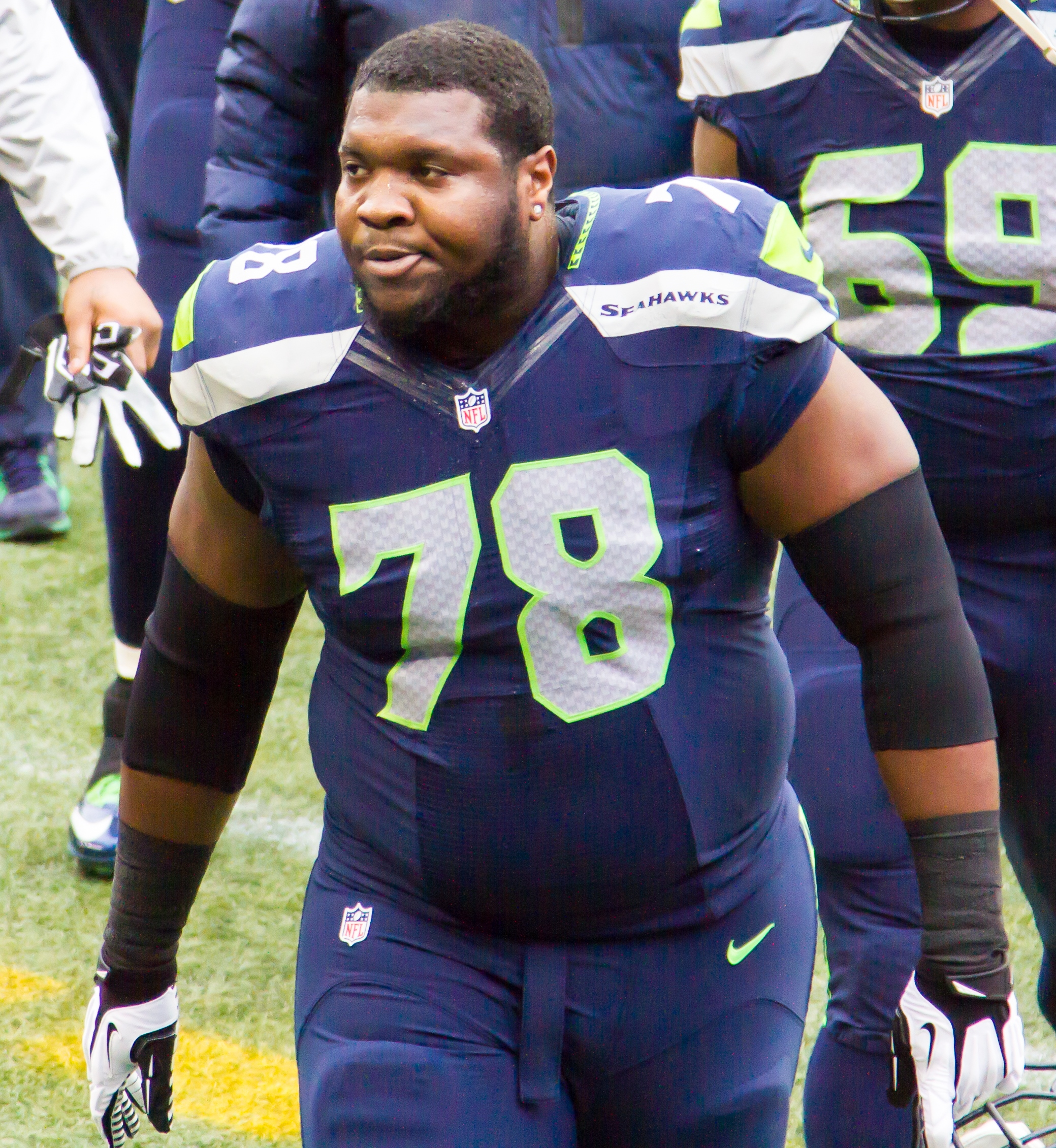
- Bailey with the Seattle Seahawks in 2013

No. 78
- Position: Guard

Personal information
- Born: August 26, 1990 (age 36); Broken Arrow, Oklahoma, U.S.
- Listed height: 6 ft 3 in (1.91 m)
- Listed weight: 320 lb (145 kg)

Career information
- High school: Broken Arrow (OK)
- College: Arkansas
- NFL draft: 2013: undrafted

Career history
- Seattle Seahawks (2013–2015); Cleveland Browns (2016)

Awards and highlights
- Super Bowl champion (XLVIII); Freshman All-American (2010); Second-team All-SEC (2011)

Career NFL statistics
- Games played: 56
- Games started: 13
- Stats at Pro Football Reference

Alvin Dewayne Bailey (born August 26, 1991) is an American former professional football player who was a guard in the National Football League (NFL). He played college football at Arkansas. He was signed by the Seattle Seahawks as an undrafted free agent in 2013.

== Early life ==
A native of Broken Arrow, Oklahoma, Bailey attended Broken Arrow Senior High School, where he anchored the offensive line for three straight season and was regarded a three-star recruit by Rivals.com. He accepted a scholarship offer from Arkansas over offers from Nebraska and Kansas State.

== College career ==
After redshirting in 2009, he started all 13 games for the Razorbacks as Arkansas was the only school in the SEC to start the same offensive line every game in 2010. In his redshirt sophomore season at Arkansas, Bailey was a Second-team All-SEC selection. As a redshirt junior, he started in all 12 games.

In December 2012, Bailey announced his decision to forgo his final year of eligibility, entering the 2013 NFL draft. He signed with Morgan Advisory Group, and began his preparations for the NFL Combine workouts in Arizona.

== Professional career ==
Although being projected as a third-/fourth-round pick, Bailey was not selected in the 2013 NFL draft.

Pre-draft measurables
Height	Weight	Arm length	Hand span	Wingspan	40-yard dash	10-yard split	20-yard split	20-yard shuttle	Three-cone drill	Bench press
6 ft 3 1/8 in (1.91 m)	312 lb (142 kg)	34 3/4 in (0.88 m)	9 3/8 in (0.24 m)	6 ft 8 7/8 in (2.05 m)	4.95 s	1.72 s	2.86 s	4.69 s	7.50 s	27 reps
No full workout at NFL Combine due to hamstring on 2nd 40-yd dash try. 20-ss and 3-cone from Arkansas Pro Day.

Bailey played for the Seattle Seahawks from 2013 to 2015. During his time with the Seahawks, the team won Super Bowl XLVIII and made an appearance in Super Bowl XLIX.

Bailey signed with the Cleveland Browns on March 11, 2016. He was suspended two games on December 15, 2016, as a result of a driving under the influence arrest in September On April 20, 2017, he was released by the Browns.
