= Roulet =

Roulet is a French surname. Notable people with the surname include:

- Elaine Roulet (1930–2020), American Roman Catholic nun
- Lloyd Emerson Roulet (1891–1985), American mayor of Toledo, Ohio
- Lorinda de Roulet (c. 1931–2025), American philanthropist
- Vincent de Roulet (c. 1925–1975), American businessman and politician

== See also ==
- Roulet family
- Roulette
