= David Alexander (American football) =

American football player and coach (born 1964)

No. 72
- Positions: Center, guard, tackle

Personal information
- Born: July 28, 1964 (age 62); Silver Spring, Maryland, U.S.
- Listed height: 6 ft 3 in (1.91 m)
- Listed weight: 285 lb (129 kg)

Career information
- High school: Broken Arrow (Broken Arrow, Oklahoma)
- College: Tulsa
- NFL draft: 1987: 5th round, 121st overall pick

Career history
- Philadelphia Eagles (1987–1994); New York Jets (1995–1996)

Career NFL statistics
- Games played: 131
- Games started: 115
- Fumble recoveries: 5
- Stats at Pro Football Reference

David Franklin Alexander (born July 28, 1964) is an American high school football coach and a former professional football center and guard. He played ten seasons in the National Football League (NFL) for the Philadelphia Eagles and the New York Jets. He played college football at the University of Tulsa and was selected in the fifth round of the 1987 NFL draft.

Pre-draft measurables
Height	Weight	Arm length	Hand span	40-yard dash	10-yard split	20-yard split	20-yard shuttle	Vertical jump	Broad jump	Bench press
6 ft 3 in (1.91 m)	279 lb (127 kg)	32 3/4 in (0.83 m)	10 1/2 in (0.27 m)	5.13 s	1.71 s	2.94 s	4.33 s	27.5 in (0.70 m)	8 ft 9 in (2.67 m)	22 reps
All values from NFL Combine

After his professional career, Alexander operated a business as a custom homebuilder, while also pursuing a career in coaching. He worked as an assistant coach for seven years at Jenks High School in Jenks, Oklahoma. In 2005–06, he was also head coach of the Tulsa Talons of the af2 arena football league. In 2013, he left Jenks to move to neighboring Broken Arrow High School, where he had played and graduated in 1982, as the running backs coach. In January 2014 he was announced as Broken Arrow's new head football coach. Although Broken Arrow won a state championship in 2018 under Alexander's leadership, it fired Alexander after the 2020 season.
