= Finale (scorewriter) =

Music notation software

- Original authors: Phil Farrand & John Borowicz
- Developers: MakeMusic, Inc.
- Release: September 16, 1988; 37 years ago
- Final release: 27.4.1 / December 12, 2023; 2 years ago
- Written in: C++
- Operating system: macOS, Microsoft Windows
- Available in: 8 languages
- List of languages Dutch, English, French, German, Italian, Japanese, Polish, Swedish
- Type: Scorewriter
- License: Proprietary
- Website: www.finalemusic.com

Finale is a proprietary music notation software developed and released by MakeMusic for Microsoft Windows and macOS from 1988 until 2024, when it was discontinued.

== Functionality ==
Finale's tools are organized into multiple hierarchically organized palettes, and the corresponding tool is selected to add or edit any particular class of score element. Voices are available in Finale as well. Several of Finale's tools provide an associated menu just to the left of the Help menu, available only when that particular tool is selected.

On the screen, Finale provides the ability to color code several elements of the score as a visual aid; on the print-out, all score elements are black (unless color print-out is explicitly chosen). With the corresponding tool selected, fine adjustment of each set of objects in a score is possible either by clicking and dragging or by entering measurements in a dialog box. A more generalized selection tool is also available to select large measure regions for editing key and time signatures or transposing, among other uses. This tool also provides the ability to reposition several classes of score objects directly, and more recent versions of the software have implemented extensive contextual meaning via this tool.

Finale automatically manages many of the basic rules of harmony and music notation, such as correct beaming, stem direction, vertical alignment of multiple rhythmic values, and established rules for positioning note heads on chords. In other situations, without advance user customization, the program makes what can be described as a good guess, especially in the area of enharmonic spelling of newly entered data generated from a MIDI keyboard, while respecting the current key signature.

Finale is capable of notating various music such as chorales or cut-out scores including new symbols invented by the composer. It has a built-in working guitar tablature system and includes a jazz font similar to that used in the Real Book. Nearly all elements in the score can be adjusted and moved.

Music can be entered using a keyboard or using the software itself. It also includes a function for optically recognizing printed music from a scan. From Finale 2001 onward, the program included MicNotator, a module able to notate melodic pitches played on a single-pitch acoustic instrument via a microphone connected to the computer.

Finale 2004 introduced FinaleScript, a scripting language for the automation of repetitive tasks.

== History ==
The first version of Finale was made by Phil Farrand and John Borowicz. They wrote the original version software for Coda Music Software, which was later sold to Net4Music and then became MakeMusic. After Finale version 3.7, Finale's marketers made the switch to years as identifiers for each new release, starting with Finale 97.

Finale 2004, released in early 2004, was the first release to run natively on Macintosh computers running Mac OS X Panther. This was considered a late release by MakeMusic, and full support for the features of Mac OS X was limited at first. More comprehensive support was brought "on-line" through maintenance releases going forward into 2004. Finale 2004 also continued to support PowerPC Macs running Mac OS 9. This release shortened the development cycle for Finale 2005, which was released the following August. While the number of new features in Finale '05 were necessarily limited, this was the first release to have both Windows and Mac versions on the same distribution CD.

Finale 2006 (released in the summer of 2005) included the Garritan Personal Orchestra, an integrated sound library. A limited-functionality music-scanning module, SmartScore Lite, was also included. Along with Page View and Scroll View, the 2006 release added StudioView, a display mode which is similar to Scroll View with the addition of a sequencer interface. This feature gave users an environment for creation, evaluation, and experimentation with different musical ideas in a multi-track environment. In StudioView, an additional staff appears above the notation, called TempoTap, allowing for complete control over tempo changes.

Finale 2007 was released with a "linked" score and part management system. A properly set-up "full score for extraction" could now contain all the data and formatting necessary to generate a full set of linked ensemble parts, ensconced within a single Finale master document. Limitations on the scope of format and layout control between parts and conductor score (including measure numbers and staff system breaks) suggested that this new feature was targeted to media production work, where quick turnaround and accuracy is a crucial factor, rather than publishing, though publishers still may use some aspects of linked parts to improve the part creation process. Finale 2007 introduced linked parts, which allow ensemble parts to remain linked to the master score.

Finale 2008 was the first version to come out with full Vista (32-bit only) support. It also changed the way several editing modes are accessed, by introducing the multi-purpose "selection tool" described above. The 2008 release offers the importation and/or recording of synchronized real-time audio as an additional single track in a document.

Finale 2009 was identified as the 20th Anniversary edition. It offers many fundamental workflow changes not seen since the program's inception, such as the organization of expressions by category. Also notable is the re-designed Page View, which enables the viewing and editing of multiple pages within the same document window: these pages may either be arranged in a horizontal line or tiled vertically within a window. Finale 2009 includes Garritan's new Aria Player Engine, and has new samples for this. The older Kontakt 2 Player is still supported, and the samples load under this also.

Finale 2010 was released in June 2009 with improvements to percussion notation and chord symbols. This version also introduced measure number enhancements, auto-ordered rehearsal marks and support for additional graphic formats.

Finale 2011 was released in June 2010 with additional Garritan Sounds, Alpha Notes (notation with note names inside), a new lyric entry window and other lyric enhancements, and a reworking of staff, system, and page layout handling. Introduced the new "Hide Empty Staves" command under the Staff menu, which hides all empty staves in systems. If notes are added to the system, the staff reappears automatically. (The capability of intentionally hiding staves containing notes is still available using a Staff Style). Other improvements to this Finale version include easier capo chords and a new Aria Player.

Finale 2012 was released in October 2011 with new functions as Finale's ScoreManager, Unicode text support, creation of PDF files, an updated setup wizard, improved sound management.

In 2013, MakeMusic signed an agreement with Alfred Music. Under this agreement, Alfred Music became the sole distributor of Finale and Garritan products.

Finale 2014 was released in November 2013 with new functions. As with all previous releases, a new file format was introduced, which is incompatible with older versions of Finale. However, this time easier file exchange with future versions of Finale was promised. Finale 2014's new functions include a rewritten file format for forward and backward file compatibility, improved Apple OS X support, a new audio engine, additional Garritan sounds, and a new user interface. 2014d is the last version. An updated version, Finale 2014.5 fixes several problems.

Finale Version 25 was released on August 16, 2016. Some new features include: ReWire support, so that Finale can be used simultaneously and in sync with digital audio software. The new "Aria Player" speeds up and simplifies the choosing of Garritan instruments. Beginning with this version, the user manual is found entirely online. Band-in-a-Box and a couple of other plug-ins were removed. The ability to import scanned documents was removed. Several other features were added.

Finale Version 26 was released on October 10, 2018. This release includes new features such as automatically stacking articulations, automated slur collision avoidance, expedited processes for entering chord symbols and expressions, and additional templates.

Finale Version 27 was released on June 15, 2021. This release includes new features like interactive music sharing functionality, Standard Music Font Layout (SMuFL) support, an improved instrument list, MusicXML 4.0, and numerous bug fixes.

On August 26, 2024, Greg Dell'Era, president of MakeMusic, announced that the software would no longer be developed or sold, and that support would end one year from the announcement date. A partnership with Dorico's developer, Steinberg, was also announced as an alternative for Finale users.

== Awards ==
- Best Book/Video/Software at the 2015 Music & Sound Awards

== See also ==
- List of scorewriters
- List of music software
- Comparison of scorewriters
