= Donald Roulet =

- Born: Donald Eugene Roulet; June 1, 1936; Beverly Hills, CA, US
- Died: May 27, 2017 (aged 80); Tulsa, OK
- Occupation: Minister Presbyterian Church USA
- Children: 3

Donald Eugene Roulet was a Presbyterian minister, known for involvement in Civil Rights issues within the Presbyterian Church USA. Roulet was a founding member of the Progressive Religion Coalition of Tulsa, an organization that advocates for religious tolerance and inclusion.

== Ministry ==
Donald Roulet became minister of the First Presbyterian Church of Broken Arrow, Oklahoma, in 1963. Through this church, Roulet established community outreach programs in the Tulsa area providing meals to senior citizens, Alcoholics Anonymous and Food Pantry Programs. Most notably, he started the Chow and Chatter Club, which provides weekly lunch to senior citizens. He served on all major committees in the Eastern Oklahoma Presbytery, before retiring in 1991. Following retirement, he served as the Executive Presbyter of the Presbytery of Southern Louisiana. Roulet obtained a Master of Divinity from McCormick Theological Seminary, as well as two Doctoral Degrees in Ministry and Theology.

== Personal life ==
Donald Eugene Roulet was born on June 1, 1936, in Beverly Hills, California. He was a member of the Franco-German Roulet family, a noble family from Alsace. After graduating from Tulsa University, he married his wife Wyneth in November, 1959. They have three grown children, Scott E. Roulet, a media executive, Michelle and Steven.

== Death ==
Roulet died on May 27, 2017, at the age of 80 from cancer.

== Honors and awards ==
Roulet was an Honorary Chaplain for the Oklahoma Senate, and an Honorary Mayor of the City of Broken Arrow. He had also been honored by the Louisiana House of Representatives.
