= Music Markup Language =

XML based music description language

Music Markup Language (MML) was an early application of XML to describe music objects and events. MML pioneered features commonly used in later music markup formalisms, such as the IEEE 1599 standard. These features included the use of XML as a foundation; the ability to describe a musical object or event comprehensively (as opposed to merely providing a machine-readable format for a traditional musical score, or for a determinate sound recording of one performance); and the division of this comprehensive information into modules (often termed layers in later work), with separate modules for metadata, lyrics, notation, sound, and performance. MML makes it possible to state relationships among written syllables, phonemes, notes in traditional musical notation, pitch, and rhythm in a flexible and extensible way.

== See also ==
- HTML audio
- MusicXML
- Music Encoding Initiative
