= Audiveris =

Open source tool for optical music recognition

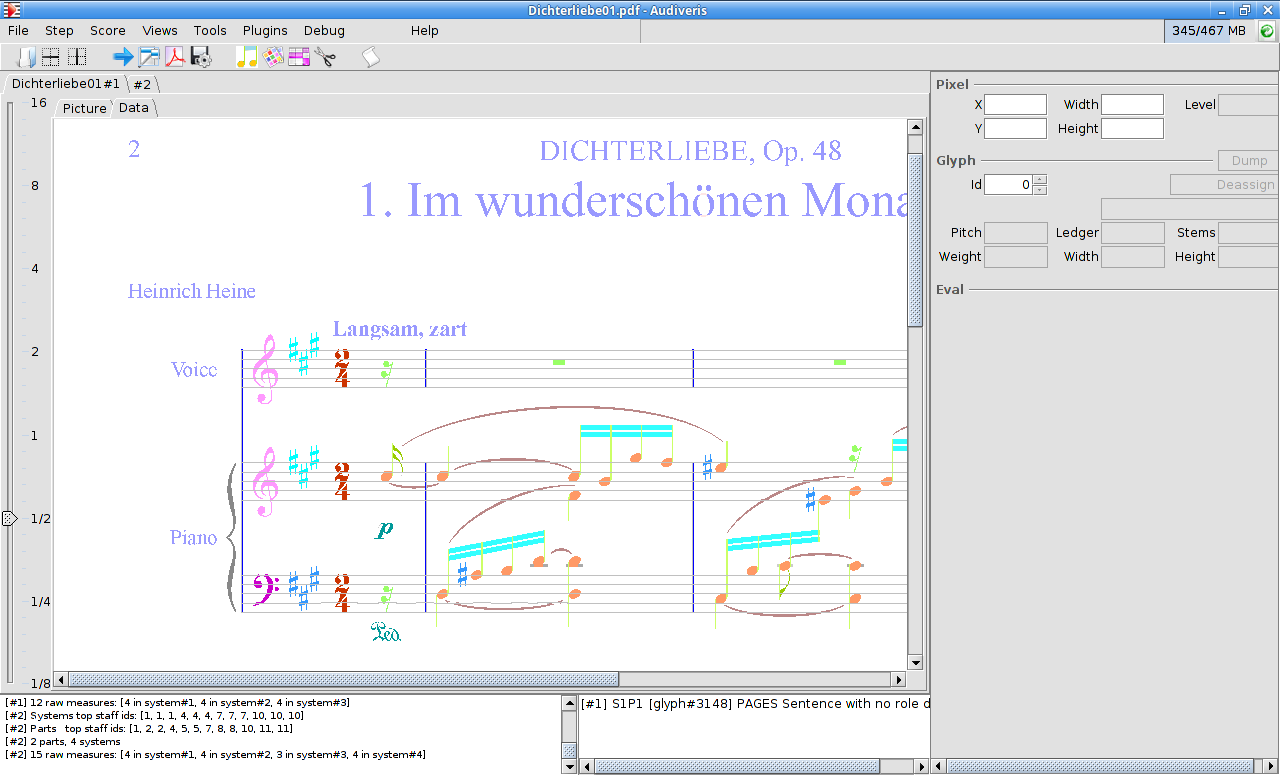
- Screenshot
- Developer: Hervé Bitteur
- Stable release: 5.10.2 / 27 March 2026; 2 months ago
- Written in: Java
- Operating system: Linux, Windows, macOS
- Available in: English, French, German, Italian
- Type: Optical music recognition
- License: AGPLv3 (free software)
- Website: github.com/Audiveris/audiveris
- Repository: github.com/Audiveris/audiveris

Audiveris is an open source tool for optical music recognition (OMR).

It allows a user to import scanned music scores and export them to MusicXML format for use in other applications, e.g. music notation programs or page turning software for digital sheet music. Thanks to Tesseract it can also recognize text in scores.

Audiveris is written in Java and published as free software. Audiveris V4 was published 26 November 2013 on the basis of Java Web Start under the terms of the GNU General Public License (GNU GPLv2). The source code of legacy versions as well as current development has moved to GitHub and is available under the terms of the GNU Affero General Public License (GNU AGPLv3).
