= Roulet family =

The Roulet Family is a Franco-German noble family of Alsace, with deep roots in the canton of Neuchâtel in Switzerland. It was established by Rollet Bayard (died before 1512), in the late 15th century. According to the family's own genealogical records, Rollet Bayard had no sons; following a common practice of the time, his son-in-law Claude Jaquet adopted his wife's surname, and subsequent generations shortened Rollet-Bayard first to Rollet and eventually to Roulet. There are also Roulet families recorded at Peseux and Neuchâtel which are probably offshoots of the same line.

François Roulet of Neuchâtel (1768–1845) was ennobled by Friedrich-Wilhelm III, and took the name de Roulet.

== Viticulture ==
The Roulet family has a long association with viticulture in the canton of Neuchâtel. Early records document members of the Peseux branch as wealthy vignerons (vignerons encaveurs) who held numerous vineyard parcels, a house with a pressoir (wine press), and wine cellars, with one member serving as governor of Peseux in 1714.

Paul Albert Roulet (fl. late 19th–early 20th century) was a prominent wine producer (propriétaire) in Peseux, in the canton of Neuchâtel, operating under the label Vins de Neuchâtel — Paul Albert Roulet, Peseux. His wines received significant recognition at multiple national exhibitions, including a Diplôme d'Honneur Collectif at the 5th Swiss Agricultural Exhibition in Neuchâtel (1887), a Diplôme d'Honneur Collectif at the Swiss National Exhibition in Geneva (1896), a Médaille d'Or at the Swiss National Exhibition in Bern (1914), and a further Diplôme d'Honneur Collectif at the 9th Swiss Agricultural Exhibition in Bern (1925).

The viticultural tradition of the Neuchâtel region in which the Roulets were active has ancient origins, with viticulture documented in the area since at least the 9th century. By the early 19th century, the Société d'émulation patriotique of Neuchâtel was actively promoting the improvement of local viticulture; among those recognised was Jean-Antoine Roulet, whose Mémoire sur la culture de la vigne was published in Neuchâtel in 1808.

== Notable members ==
- Lorinda de Roulet American heiress, philanthropist and former president of the New York Mets
- Donald Roulet Presbyterian minister and civil rights activist
- Vincent de Roulet United States Ambassador to Jamaica
