= Cut-out score =

Score with omitted rest measures

A cut-out score or cutout score is a musical score in which measures with rests are simply omitted, and no rests of any kind are used. Cut-out scores are mostly used for proportional notation scores, such as Penderecki's Threnody to the Victims of Hiroshima. "Proponents of this arrangement argue that it dispenses with needless clutter on the score page," while "others maintain that not enough is gained by this format to justify the extra effort in setting up the score."

Cut-out scores can be created with any full-featured scorewriter, such as Finale or Sibelius. Instead of extracting parts, all the players are given the score.

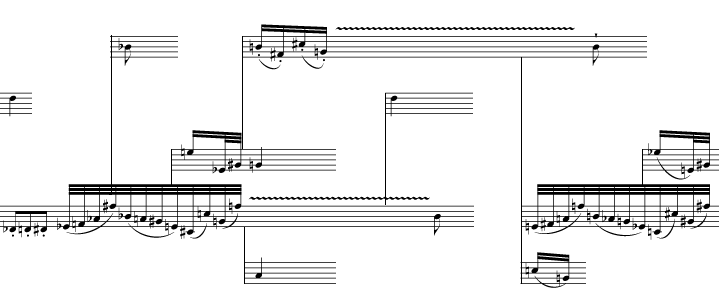
