= NetMusicZone Records =

German record label

netMusicZone Records is a record company based in Bad Hindelang, Germany. They are distributed by Rough Trade Distribution. Artists include Anne Clark and the Klaxons.
