= SmartScore =

Music OCR and notation software

SmartScore 64 NE
- Developer: Musitek Corporation
- Initial release: 1991; 35 years ago
- Stable release: 11.6.113 (Windows); 11.6.115 (macOS) / October 13, 2025; 3 months ago
- Operating system: Microsoft Windows, macOS
- Type: Music OCR
- License: Commercial proprietary
- Website: www.musitek.com

SmartScore 64 NE is a music OCR and scorewriter program, developed, published and distributed by Musitek Corporation based in Ojai, California.

== History ==
SmartScore was originally released in 1991 as MIDISCAN for Windows. The product line was later changed to "SmartScore" and re-released for Windows 98 in 1998, and for the Macintosh Power PC in 1999 as a scanning/scoring hybrid product.

== Overview ==
SmartScore is a software product which performs optical character recognition on scanned music and converts it into a digital musical score that can be played back as a MIDI file, or exported as MusicXML to music engraving programs such as Sibelius and Finale.

== Reception ==
Maximum PC reviewed SmartScore in 2000 and said that it "gets the job done easily", but was difficult to navigate and had a crowded layout. Also, some scores scanned by Maximum PC weren't recognized by the software.

Researchers at the University of Florence conducted a performance assessment of optical music recognition software in 2007, and found that software developed at the University, Object Oriented Optical Music Recognition System, as well as SharpEye 2 outperformed it.

In 2009, a review of SmartScore X in Music Educators Journal found the scanning performance to be "extremely accurate" with professionally engraved music, but said the program was only able to "minimally interpret" handwritten scores. The reviewer stated that the user interface was confusing even for advanced users, and that the manual offered "little or no help, especially for the novice".

In 2011 a review in PC World said the results with clearly printed sheet music were accurate, but that the interface had too many floating and docked toolbars. The reviewer said there was "no more effective musical OCR/editor on the market", but that PhotoScore 6 Ultimate gave superior results with handwritten music.

== See also ==
- List of music software
