= Broken Arrow Public Schools =

School district in Oklahoma

Location
- 701 S. Main Street; Broken Arrow, Oklahoma 74012 Tulsa County United States

District information
- Type: Public, Primary, Secondary
- Established: 1904
- Schools: 28

Students and staff
- Students: 20,000+
- Athletic conference: 6A

Other information
- Website: www.baschools.org

Broken Arrow Public Schools (BAPS) is a public school district in Broken Arrow, Oklahoma. It was established in 1904. The district resides in an urban-suburban community with nearby agricultural areas and a growing business and industrial base. Serving more than 20,000 students, BAPS has four early childhood centers (Pre-K), 16 elementary schools (grades K-5), five middle schools (grades 6–8), one freshman academy (ninth grade), one high school (grades 10–12), one Options Academy, Virtual Academy, Vanguard Academy and Early College High School.

Broken Arrow High School and the Freshman Academy are fully accredited by the state of Oklahoma and the North Central Association of Secondary Schools and Colleges.

Most of the district is in Tulsa County, where it includes most of Broken Arrow and a portion of Tulsa. It extends into Wagoner County, where it includes all of that county's portion of Broken Arrow, a part of that county's part of Tulsa, and a portion of Coweta.

== Schools ==
=== High schools ===
- Broken Arrow High School (Grades 10–12)
- Broken Arrow Freshman Academy (Grade 9)
- Broken Arrow Options Academy (Grades 9-12)
- Early College Academy (Grades 9-12)
- Vanguard Academy (Grades 9-12)

=== Middle schools ===
- Ernest Childers Middle School
- Centennial Middle School
- Oliver Middle School
- Oneta Ridge Middle School
- Sequoyah Middle School

Sequoyah 8th Grade Academy

=== Elementary schools ===
- Arrowhead Elementary
- Aspen Creek Elementary
- Country Lane Intermediate (Grades 3rd - 5th)
- Country Lane Primary (Grades K - 2nd)
- Creekwood Elementary
- Highland Park Elementary
- Leisure Park Elementary
- Liberty Elementary
- Lynn Wood Elementary
- Oak Crest Elementary
- Rhoades Elementary
- Rosewood Elementary
- Spring Creek Elementary
- Timber Ridge Elementary
- Vandever Elementary
- Wolf Creek Elementary

=== Early Childhood Schools ===
- Aspen Creek ECC
- Creekwood ECC
- Park Lane ECC

== Athletics ==
- Visit BAPS' Athletics website

== Fine Arts ==
- Visit BAPS' Fine Arts website
