= Broken Arrow, Oklahoma =

Broken Arrow, Oklahoma Rē Kackv (Creek)
- City
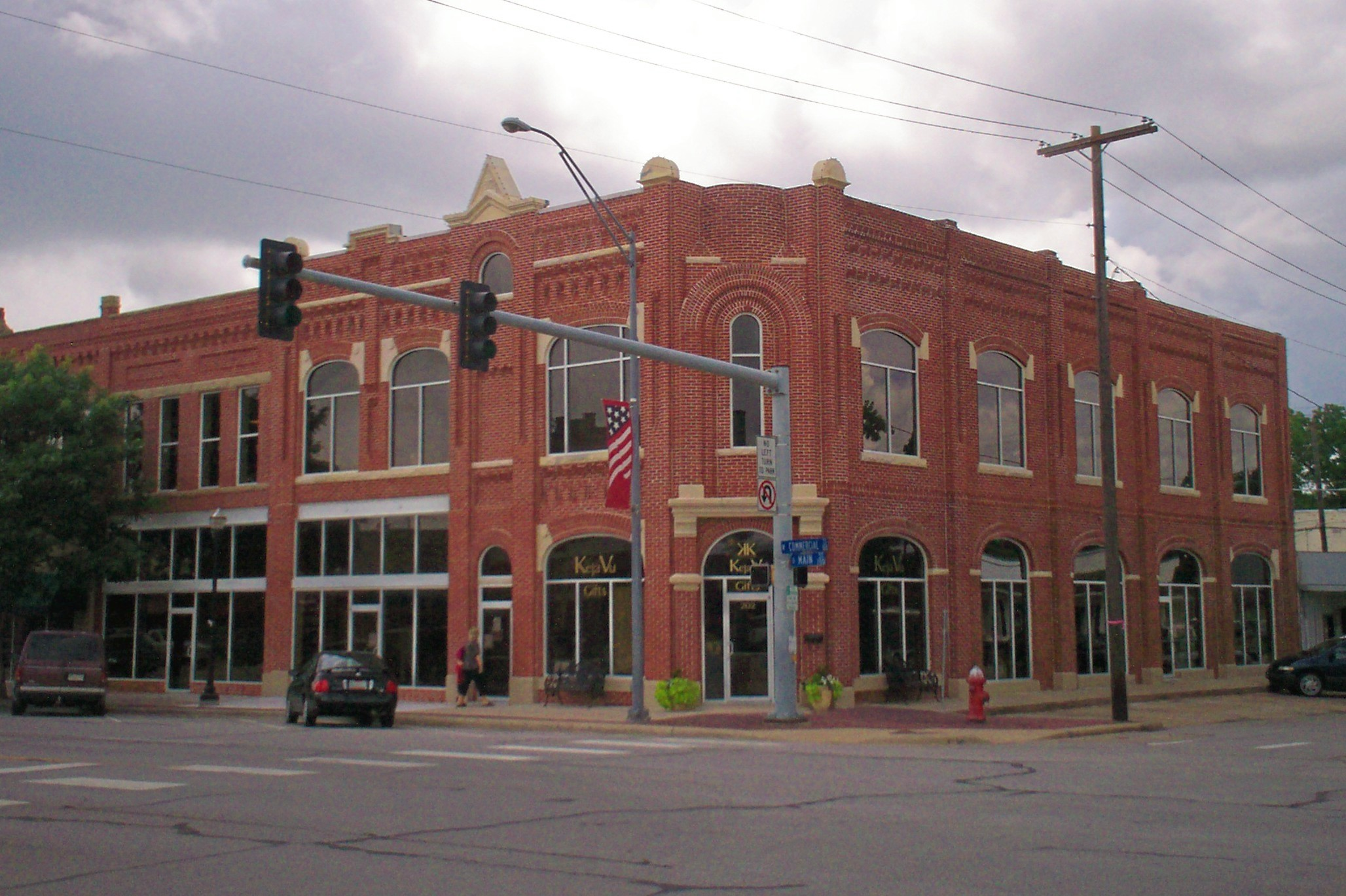
- Downtown Broken Arrow (2007)

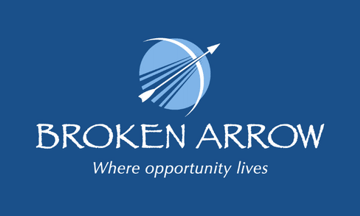
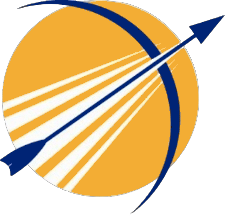
- Flag Seal
- Interactive map of Broken Arrow, Oklahoma
- Coordinates: 36°03′9″N 95°47′27″W
- Country: United States
- State: Oklahoma
- Counties: Tulsa, Wagoner
- Founded: 1902
- Incorporated: 1903

Government
  - Type: Council-Manager
  - Mayor: Debra Wimpee (R)
  - City Manager: Michael L. Spurgeon

Area
  - City: 63.54 sq mi (164.58 km^{2})
  - Land: 62.96 sq mi (163.07 km^{2})
  - Water: 0.58 sq mi (1.51 km^{2})
- Elevation: 750 ft (230 m)

Population (2020)
  - City: 113,540
  - Rank: 241st in the United States; 4th in Oklahoma
  - Density: 1,803.4/sq mi (696.28/km^{2})
  - Metro: 1,015,331 (US: 53rd)
- Time zone: UTC−6 (CST)
  - Summer (DST): UTC−5 (CDT)
- ZIP codes: 74011-74014
- Area code: 918/539
- FIPS code: 40-09050
- GNIS feature ID: 1090512
- Website: brokenarrowok.gov

Broken Arrow (/ˈbroʊkənˈæroʊ/; Creek: Rē Kackv) is a city in Tulsa and Wagoner counties in the U.S. state of Oklahoma. It is the largest suburb of Tulsa. According to the 2020 census, Broken Arrow has a population of 113,540 residents and is the 4th most populous city in the state. The city is part of the Tulsa Metropolitan Area, which has a population of 1,023,988 residents.

The Missouri–Kansas–Texas Railroad sold lots for the town site in 1902 and company secretary William S. Fears named it Broken Arrow. The city was named for a community settled by Creek Native Americans who had been forced to relocate from Alabama to Oklahoma along the Trail of Tears.

Although Broken Arrow was originally an agricultural community, its current economy is diverse. The city has the third-largest concentration of manufacturers in the state.

== History ==
The city's name comes from an old Creek community in Alabama. Members of that community were expelled from Alabama by the United States government, along the Trail of Tears in the 1830s. The Creek founded a new community in the Indian Territory and named it after their old settlement in Alabama. The town's name in the Muscogee language was Rekackv (pronounced [ɬiˌkaːtʃkə]), meaning "broken arrow". The new Creek settlement was located several miles south of present-day downtown Broken Arrow.

The community of Elam, located in present-day Broken Arrow near 145th East Avenue and 111th Street, began around 1901. It consisted of a cluster of stores, a cotton gin, and a few homes.

In 1902 the Missouri–Kansas–Texas Railroad planned a railroad through the area and was granted town site privileges along the route. They sold three of the as-yet-unnamed sites to the Arkansas Valley Town Site Company. William S. Fears, secretary of that company, was allowed to choose and name one of the locations. He selected a site about 18 miles (29 km) southeast of Tulsa and about 5 miles (8 km) north of the thlee-Kawtch-kuh settlement and named the new townsite Broken Arrow, after the Indian community. The MKT railroad, which was completed in 1903, ran through the middle of the city. It still exists today and is now owned by Union Pacific, which currently uses it for freight.

For the first decades of Broken Arrow's history, the town's economy was based mainly on agriculture. The coal industry also played an important role, with several strip coal mines located near the city in the early 20th century. The city's newspaper, the Broken Arrow Ledger, started within a couple of years of the city's founding. Broken Arrow's first school was built in 1904. The city did not grow much during the first half of the 1900s. During this time Broken Arrow's main commercial center was along Main Street. Most of the city's churches were also located on or near Main Street as well. A 1907 government census listed Broken Arrow's population as 1,383.

The Haskell State School of Agriculture opened in the Broken Arrow, Oklahoma Opera House on November 15, 1909. The school closed in 1917 for lack of funding, and the building was then used as Broken Arrow High School. The building was razed in 1987. Only a marker remains at 808 East College Street in Broken Arrow. The front of cornerstone reads, "Haskell State School / Of Agriculture / J. H. Esslinger Supt. / W. A. Etherton Archt. / Bucy & Walker Contr." The side of cornerstone reads "Laid by the Masonic Fraternity / May 25, A. D. 1910, A. L. 5810. / George Huddell G. M. / Erected by The State Board of Agriculture / J. P. Conners Pres. / B. C. Pittuck Dean.". The school is commemorated on the National Register of Historic Places.

In the 1960s, Broken Arrow began to grow from a small town into a suburban city. The Broken Arrow Expressway (Oklahoma State Highway 51) was constructed in the mid-1960s and connected the city with downtown Tulsa, fueling growth in Broken Arrow. The population swelled from a little above 11,000 in 1970 to more than 50,000 in 1990, and then more than 74,000 by the year 2000. During this time, the city was more of a bedroom community. In recent years, city leaders have pushed for more economic development to help keep more citizens of Broken Arrow working, shopping, and relaxing in town rather than going to other cities.

=== Bever family murders ===
The Bever family murders took place on July 22, 2015, when five members of the Bever family were murdered in Broken Arrow, Oklahoma, United States. The attackers were identified as 18-year-old Robert Bever and 16-year-old Michael Bever.

=== 2022 Nelson family murders ===
On October 27, authorities arrived to home that was on fire. As they arrived they found the bodies of Brian and Brittany Nelson each with gunshot wounds on the front porch. As firefighters fought the flames they found the bodies of the couple’s six children, all dead from multiple gunshot wounds. It is believed that both parents had shot and killed their children before committing suicide due to financial ruin.

It became the deadliest mass murder and crime in Broken Arrow’s history.

== Geography ==
Broken Arrow is located in the northeastern corner of Oklahoma. The city is part of the state's Green Country region known for its green vegetation, hills and lakes. Green Country is the most topographically diverse portion of the state with seven of Oklahoma's 11 eco-regions.

According to the United States Census Bureau, the city has a total area of 45.6 square miles (118 km^{2}), of which 45.0 sq mi (117 km^{2}) is land and 0.6 sq mi (1.6 km^{2}), or 1.34%, is water.

=== Climate ===
Broken Arrow has the typical eastern and central Oklahoma humid subtropical climate (Köppen: Cfa) with uncomfortably hot summers and highly variable winters that can range from mild to very cold depending on whether the air mass comes from warmed air over the Rocky Mountains or very cold polar anticyclones from Canada.

Climate data for Broken Arrow, Oklahoma
Month	Jan	Feb	Mar	Apr	May	Jun	Jul	Aug	Sep	Oct	Nov	Dec	Year
Mean daily maximum °F (°C)	45.7 (7.6)	51.2 (10.7)	61.3 (16.3)	72.1 (22.3)	79.1 (26.2)	87.1 (30.6)	92.9 (33.8)	91.9 (33.3)	83.6 (28.7)	74.5 (23.6)	60.9 (16.1)	49.8 (9.9)	70.8 (21.6)
Mean daily minimum °F (°C)	22.2 (−5.4)	26.5 (−3.1)	35.5 (1.9)	46.8 (8.2)	56.1 (13.4)	64.8 (18.2)	69.1 (20.6)	66.7 (19.3)	59.3 (15.2)	46.4 (8.0)	35.8 (2.1)	26.5 (−3.1)	46.3 (7.9)
Average precipitation inches (mm)	1.6 (41)	1.8 (46)	3.2 (81)	3.5 (89)	5.0 (130)	4.6 (120)	2.9 (74)	2.8 (71)	4.7 (120)	3.7 (94)	3.1 (79)	2.0 (51)	38.9 (996)
Source: Weatherbase.com

== Demographics ==
Historical population
Census	Pop.	Note	%±
1900	1,383		—
1910	1,576		14.0%
1920	2,086		32.4%
1930	1,964		−5.8%
1940	2,074		5.6%
1950	3,262		57.3%
1960	5,982		83.4%
1970	11,787		97.0%
1980	35,761		203.4%
1990	58,043		62.3%
2000	74,859		29.0%
2010	98,850		32.0%
2020	113,540		14.9%
2024 (est.)	122,756		8.1%
U.S. Decennial Census; 2024 Estimate

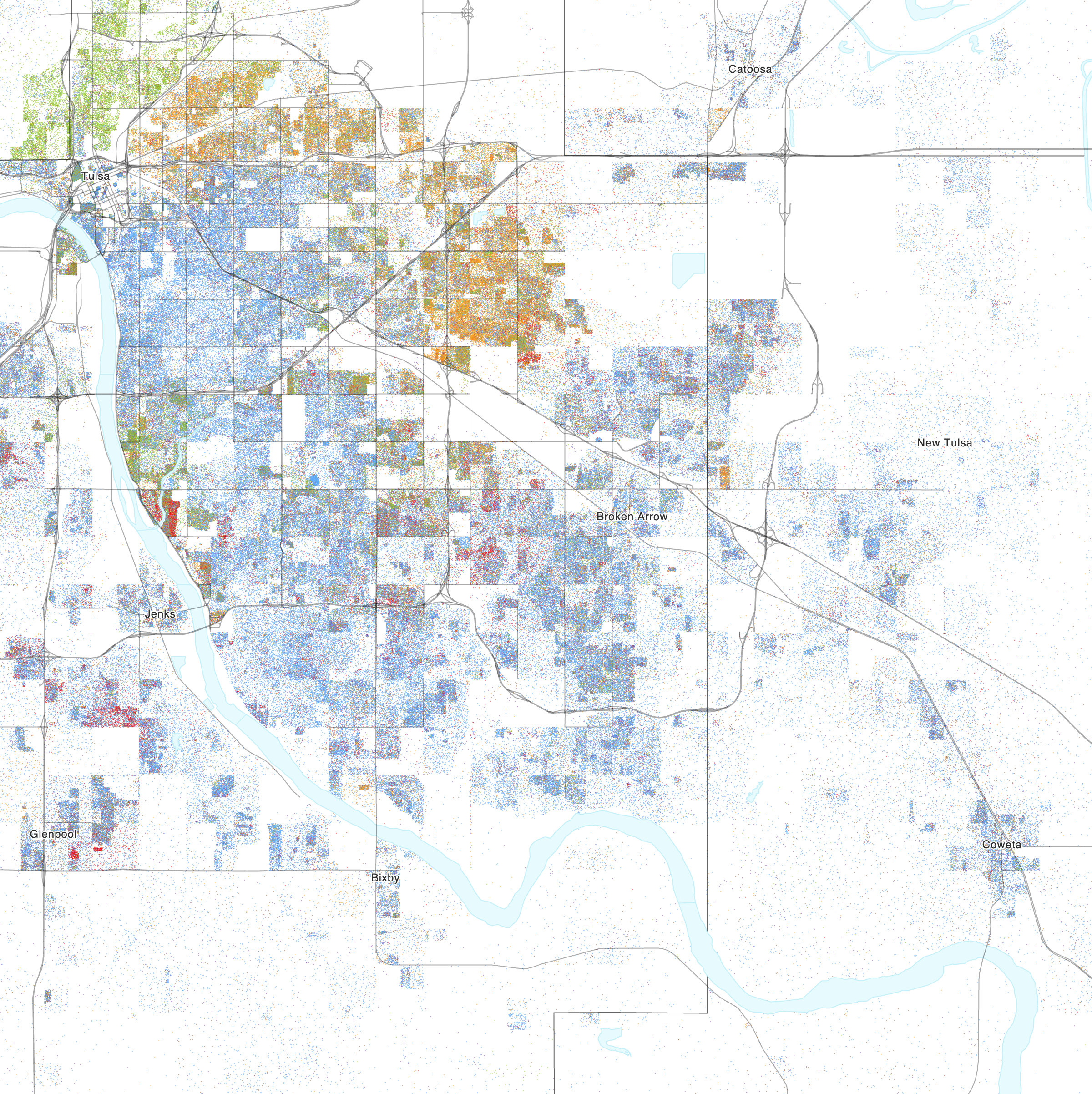
Map of racial distribution in Broken Arrow, 2020 U.S. census. Each dot is one person: ⬤ White ⬤ Black ⬤ Asian ⬤ Hispanic ⬤ Multiracial ⬤ Native American/Other

=== Racial and ethnic composition ===
Broken Arrow, Oklahoma – Racial and ethnic composition Note: the US Census treats Hispanic/Latino as an ethnic category. This table excludes Latinos from the racial categories and assigns them to a separate category. Hispanics/Latinos may be of any race.
Race / ethnicity NH = Non-Hispanic	Pop 2000	Pop 2010	Pop 2020	% 2000	% 2010	% 2020
White alone (NH)	62,485	75,008	72,706	83.47%	75.88%	64.04%
Black or African American alone (NH)	2,728	4,169	5,706	3.64%	4.22%	5.03%
Native American or Alaska Native alone (NH)	2,934	4,882	5,894	3.92%	4.94%	5.19%
Asian alone (NH)	1,413	3,568	5,136	1.89%	3.61%	4.52%
Pacific Islander alone (NH)	38	42	69	0.05%	0.04%	0.06%
Other race alone (NH)	73	77	382	0.10%	0.08%	0.34%
Mixed race or Multiracial (NH)	2,524	4,726	12,009	3.37%	4.78%	10.58%
Hispanic or Latino (any race)	2,664	6,378	11,638	3.56%	6.45%	10.25%
Total	74,859	98,850	113,540	100.00%	100.00%	100.00%

=== 2020 census ===
As of the 2020 census, Broken Arrow had a population of 113,540. The median age was 37.6 years. 24.8% of residents were under the age of 18 and 16.0% of residents were 65 years of age or older. For every 100 females there were 94.3 males, and for every 100 females age 18 and over there were 91.1 males age 18 and over.

98.4% of residents lived in urban areas, while 1.6% lived in rural areas.

There were 42,699 households in Broken Arrow, of which 34.6% had children under the age of 18 living in them. Of all households, 55.4% were married-couple households, 14.8% were households with a male householder and no spouse or partner present, and 24.1% were households with a female householder and no spouse or partner present. About 22.8% of all households were made up of individuals and 9.3% had someone living alone who was 65 years of age or older.

There were 44,860 housing units, of which 4.8% were vacant. Among occupied housing units, 72.1% were owner-occupied and 27.9% were renter-occupied. The homeowner vacancy rate was 1.5% and the rental vacancy rate was 6.8%.

Racial composition as of the 2020 census
Race	Percentage
White	66.2%
Black or African American	5.1%
American Indian and Alaska Native	5.6%
Asian	4.6%
Native Hawaiian and Other Pacific Islander	0.1%
Some other race	3.9%
Two or more races	14.6%
Hispanic or Latino (of any race)	10.3%

=== 2010 census ===
According to the 2010 census, there were 98,850 people, 36,141 households, and 27,614 families residing in the city. The population density was 2,200 inhabitants per square mile (850/km^{2}). There were 38,013 housing units at an average density of 602.0 per square mile (232.4/km^{2}). The racial makeup of the city was 79.3% White, 4.3% African American, 5.2% Native American, 3.6% Asian (1.0% Vietnamese, 0.7% Indian, 0.4% Chinese, 0.3% Korean, 0.3% Hmong, 0.2% Pakistani, 0.2% Filipino, 0.1% Japanese), 0.05% Pacific Islander, 2.2% from other races, and 5.4% from two or more races. Hispanic or Latino were 6.5% (4.4% Mexican, 0.4% Puerto Rican, 0.3% Spanish, 0.1% Venezuelan, 0.1% Colombian).

There were 36,141 households, out of which 36.8% had children under the age of 18 living with them, 76.4% were married couples living together, 10.3% had a female householder with no husband present, and 23.6% were non-families. Of all households, 19.2% were made up of individuals, and 6.3% had someone living alone who was 65 years of age or older. The average household size was 2.72 and the average family size was 3.11.

In the city, the population dispersal was 30.8% under the age of 18, 7.7% from 18 to 24, 32.3% from 25 to 44, 21.6% from 45 to 64, and 7.5% who were 65 years of age or older. The median age was 33 years. For every 100 females, there were 95.1 males. For every 100 females age 18 and over, there were 91.2 males.

The median income for a household in the city was $65,385 and the median income for a family was $74,355. The per capita income for the city was $29,141. About 7.2% of the population were below the poverty line. Of the city's population over the age of 25, 30.3% hold a bachelor's degree or higher.

== Business and industry ==
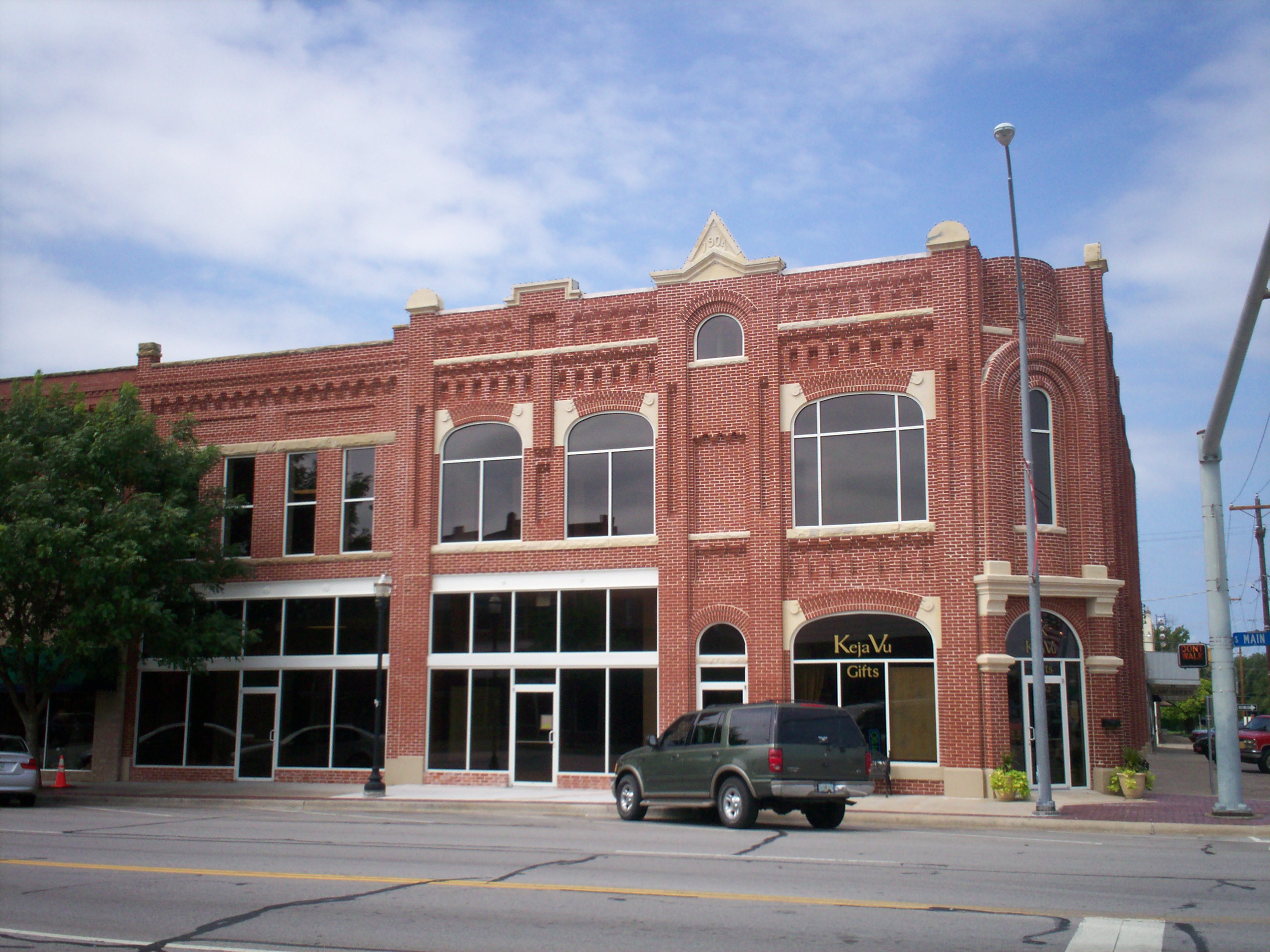
Historic building on Main Street after a total restoration (June 2007)

Broken Arrow is home to a wide range of businesses and industries. In fact, the city is ranked third in its concentration of manufacturers in the state.

Some of the city's more notable employers include:

- FlightSafety International
- FedEx Ground
- Blue Bell Creameries
- Windstream Communications

Located in Broken Arrow since 1985, FlightSafety International (FSI) designs and builds aviation crew training devices called Flight Simulators at its Simulation Systems Division. With currently over 675 employees located there, of which about half are engineers, FSI is the largest private employer in the city.

A number of new commercial developments are being built throughout the city, most notably along Oklahoma State Highway 51, which runs through the city. A Bass Pro Shops Outdoor World opened in 2005 as the anchor to a development that includes hotels, restaurants, shopping, and eventually offices. A new full-service hospital and medical office building were constructed nearby in 2010 as an anchor to another large commercial development that will include retail space and two hotels. Oklahoma's first Dick's Sporting Goods opened in late 2011.

In 2007 the city created the Broken Arrow Economic Development Corporation to help oversee economic development.

In late 2007, the Broken Arrow Chamber of Commerce began "Advance Broken Arrow", an economic development campaign aimed at expanding and diversifying the city's economic base.

In October 2023, plans were announced for a new 12,500-seat amphitheater to be built in town by 2025. The Sunset Amphitheater is projected to host a minimum of 45 concert events annually.

=== Downtown redevelopment ===
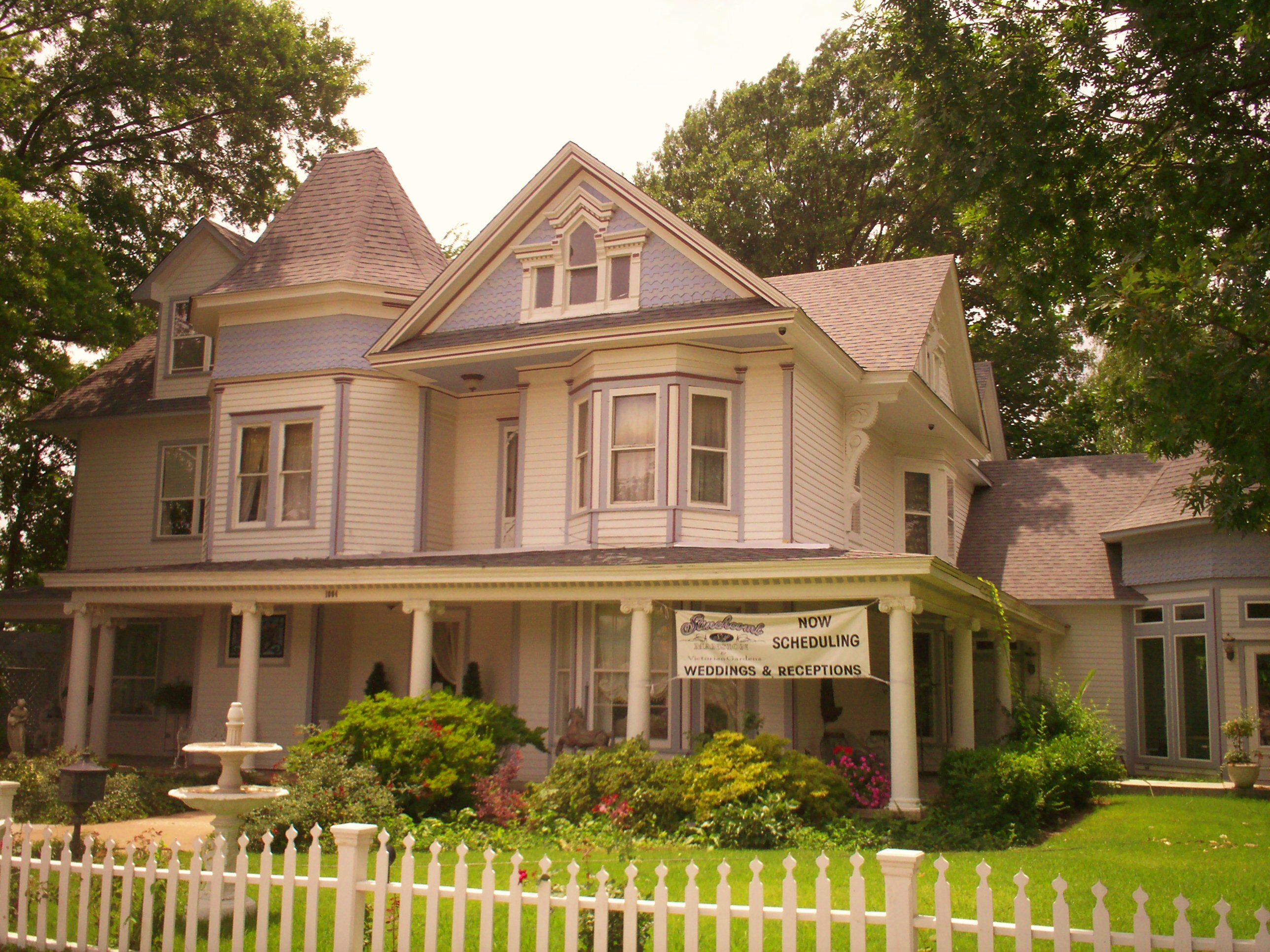
Historic 1904 Victorian home on Main Street in downtown BA that has been converted into a business (July 2007)

In 2005, the city adopted a downtown revitalization master plan to help revive the city's historic downtown area. Some of the plans include a new 3-story museum to house the historical society and genealogical society, a farmer's market and plaza, a new performing arts center, updates and expansions to area parks, the conversion of the historic Central Middle School on Main Street into a professional development center, infrastructure, and landscape improvements, and incentives to encourage denser infill, redevelopment, and reuse of the area's historic structures. Numerous buildings and homes have since been renovated, many new shops and offices have moved to downtown, and new townhomes are being built. The new historical museum, farmers market, and performing arts center opened in 2008.

The city also sets strict new design standards in place that all new developments in the downtown area must adhere to. These standards were created to prevent "suburban" development in favor of denser, "urban" development, and to ensure that new structures complement and fit in with the historic buildings downtown. In October 2012 Downtown Broken Arrow's main street corridor was named the Rose District.

== Government ==
City government:
Ward 1	Mayor Debra Wimpee
Ward 2	Lisa Ford
Ward 3	Vice Mayor Christi Gillespie
Ward 4	Scott Eudey
At-Large	Johnnie Parks

Broken Arrow uses the council–manager model of municipal government. The city's primary authority resides in the city council which approves ordinances, resolutions, amendments, and contracts. The city council consists of five members with one member elected from each of the four city wards, and the fifth member as an at-large member. Each council member serves for a two-year term and is eligible to serve for four years. Out of the council members, a mayor and vice-mayor are chosen every two years. The day-to-day operations of the city are run by the city manager, who reports directly to the city council.

At the federal level, Broken Arrow lies within Oklahoma's 1st congressional district, represented by Kevin Hern. In the State Senate, Broken Arrow includes parts of Districts 33 and 36, represented by Christi Gillespie and John Haste, respectively. In the State House, Broken Arrow includes all or part of districts 12, 16, 75, 76, 80 and 98.

== Parks and recreation ==
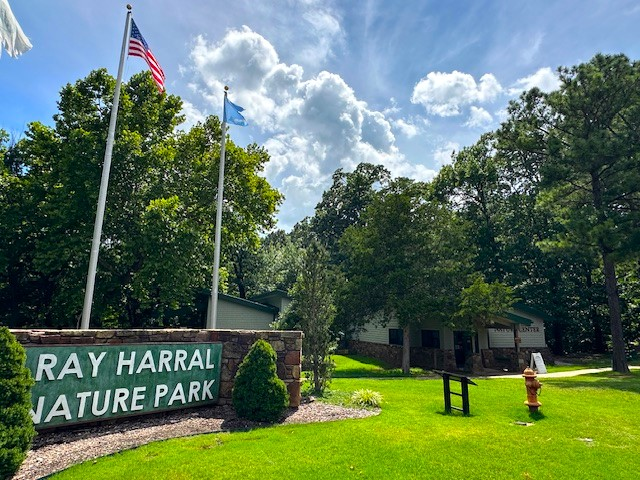
Ray Harrel Park with Nature Center in background, July 2025

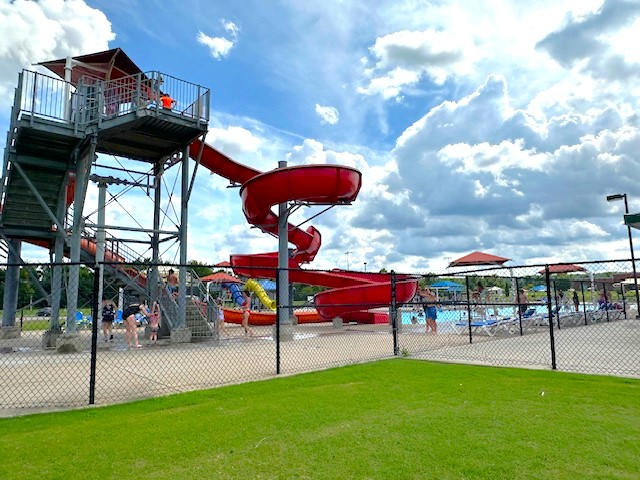
Nienhuis Aquatic Facility, July 2025

Included among Broken Arrow parks are:

- The Ray Harral Nature Center & Park, a 40-acre facility which includes nature trails, picnic shelters and a nature center
- Nienhuis Park, which has the Nienhuis Aquatic Facility, the Nienhuis Skate Park and a Community Center
- Indian Springs Sports Complex, a 234-acre facility including multiple sports fields
- Rose West Dog Park
- Tennis/Pickleball courts in various sites inc. Aspen Creek Park, Central Park, Country Aire Park, Morrow Park, Nienhuis Park, Timberbrook Park, Vandever Park, & Wolf Creek Park.

== Education ==
Broken Arrow is served by Broken Arrow Public Schools, Union Public Schools, and Bixby Public Schools.

Within Tulsa County, most of the city is served by BAPS while the northwestern area of town is served by Union Public Schools, with a far southwest area in Bixby Public Schools. Areas of the city which extend into Wagoner County are zoned to BAPS.

=== Colleges and universities ===
Higher education in Broken Arrow is provided by Northeastern State University (Broken Arrow campus). The campus opened in 2001 and has an upperclassmen and graduate student enrollment of approximately 3,000.

Broken Arrow is also served by Tulsa Technology Center Broken Arrow Campus. Established in 1983, it has an enrollment of about 3,500 full- and part-time secondary and adult students.

Broken Arrow is also home to Rhema Bible Training Center, established in 1974 by Kenneth E. Hagin; located on 110 acres (45 ha), it has graduated over 40,000 alumni and has seven ministry concentrations. RBTC is currently led by Hagin's son, Kenneth W. Hagin.

=== Libraries ===
The city's two libraries, Broken Arrow Library and South Broken Arrow Library, are part of the Tulsa City-County Library System.

== Infrastructure ==
Major highways in Broken Arrow include State Highway 51 (Broken Arrow Expressway). It passes through the north side of the city and leads to downtown Tulsa to the northwest. Heading east on the Broken Arrow Expressway leads to the Muskogee Turnpike, which connects the city to Muskogee. Partial beltway Creek Turnpike circles around the south of the city and connects the Turner Turnpike to the west terminus of the Will Rogers Turnpike.

Public transportation for Broken Arrow is provided by Tulsa Transit. It has one route that connects the city to Tulsa. Bus services run Monday through Friday.

== Media ==
=== Newspapers ===
Broken Arrow had one newspaper, the Broken Arrow Ledger. The paper was published every Wednesday. It was owned by BH Media Group. The Tulsa World, northeast Oklahoma's major daily newspaper, also features Broken Arrow news regularly. The Ledger was closed by the Tulsa World’s owners in 2017.

=== Television ===
Cox Cable channel 24 is the Broken Arrow government-access television (GATV) cable TV municipal information channel. It displays, among other things, information about the city government, upcoming events, and general information about the city. The channel also features local weather reports.

=== Internet ===
Broken Arrow has a website that provides information on the city, its government, local amenities, safety, local news, and economic development. The city's chamber of commerce also has a website, which contains information about the chamber and economic development in the city.

== Notable people ==
- David Alexander, former NFL player and former head coach of Broken Arrow High School football team
- Brady Bacon, racing driver
- Alvin Bailey, offensive lineman for the Seattle Seahawks
- Ralph Blane, composer
- Jim Baumer, former Major League infielder and general manager for Milwaukee Brewers
- Archie Bradley, pitcher for the Los Angeles Angels, drafted 7th overall in 2011 MLB first-year player draft
- Jim Brewer, former Major League pitcher with Los Angeles Dodgers
- P.C. Cast, author and novelist best known for the House of Night series
- Kristin Chenoweth, singer, actress and graduate of Broken Arrow High School. Broken Arrow Performing Arts Center's (PAC) theater and stage are named after her.
- Ernest Childers, Medal of Honor recipient in World War II
- Marguerite Churchill, actress, died in Broken Arrow
- Levi Coleman, soccer player and coach
- DeDe Dorsey, Las Vegas Locomotives running back, former NFL player with Cincinnati Bengals and Indianapolis Colts
- Phil Farrand, author known for Nitpicker's Guides
- Kenneth E. Hagin, evangelist and founder of Rhema Bible Training College
- Holley Hollan, racing driver
- Steve Logan, running backs coach for Tampa Bay Buccaneers
- JD McPherson, singer-songwriter and guitarist
- George O'Brien, actor
- Charles Ogle, racing driver
- Brad Penny, Major League Baseball pitcher
- Jamie Pinkerton, Head Women's Softball Coach at Iowa State University, graduate of Broken Arrow High School.
- Donald Roulet, Presbyterian minister and civil rights activist
- Warren Spahn, Hall of Fame baseball pitcher and longtime Broken Arrow resident
- Will Thomas, historical mystery writer, winner of the 2005 and 2015 Oklahoma Book Award for fiction
- Andy Wilkins, first baseman for the Milwaukee Brewers
- Kathryn Zaremba, stage actress
