= 2015 New York Mets season =

Major League Baseball season

2015 New York Mets
- National League champions National League East champions
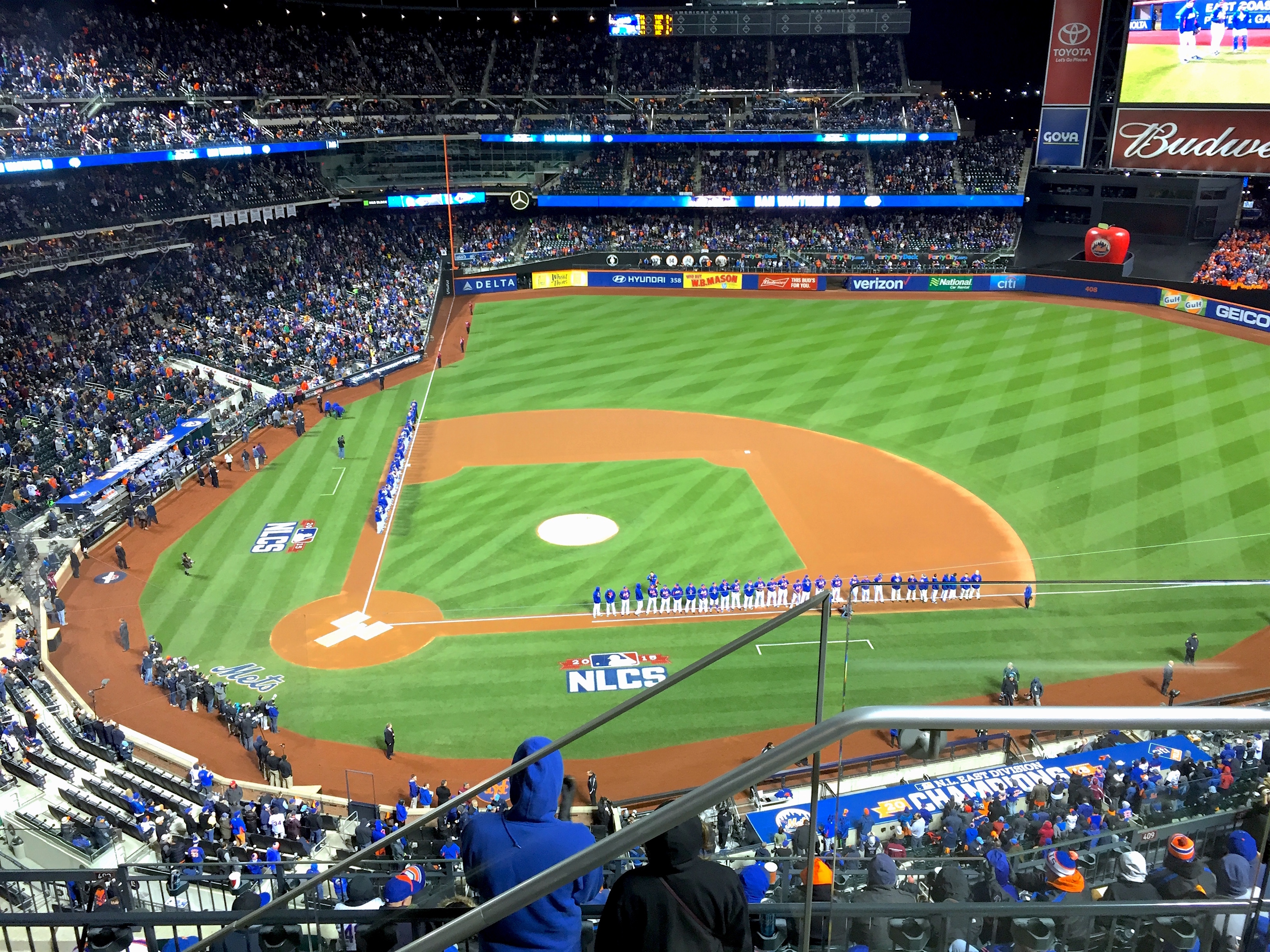
- Citi Field during the 2015 National League Championship Series
- League: National League
- Division: East
- Ballpark: Citi Field
- City: New York, New York
- Record: 90–72 (.556)
- Divisional place: 1st
- Owners: Fred Wilpon
- General manager: Sandy Alderson
- Manager: Terry Collins
- Television: SportsNet New York; WPIX (CW affiliate) (Gary Cohen, Ron Darling, Keith Hernandez, Steve Gelbs)
- Radio: WOR (English); New York Mets Radio Network (Howie Rose, Josh Lewin, Wayne Randazzo); WQBU-FM (Spanish) (Juan Alicea, Max Perez Jiminez)

The 2015 New York Mets season was the 54th season in the franchises' history. The Mets finished the regular season with a record of 90–72, winning the National League East title on September 26, their first since 2006 and sixth overall. They defeated the Los Angeles Dodgers in the NLDS in five games and swept the Chicago Cubs in the NLCS. They lost to the Kansas City Royals in five games in the 2015 World Series. It was the Mets' first appearance in the World Series since 2000 when they lost to their crosstown rivals the New York Yankees. It marked the team's first winning season since Citi Field opened in 2009 (and their first since 2008, their last season at Citi Field's predecessor, Shea Stadium). As of 2026, this season marks the last time the Mets won the NL East. It is also their most recent World Series appearance.

== Regular season ==
=== Opening Day ===
Opening Day Starters
Name	Position
Curtis Granderson	RF
David Wright	3B
Lucas Duda	1B
Michael Cuddyer	LF
Daniel Murphy	2B
Juan Lagares	CF
Travis d'Arnaud	C
Wilmer Flores	SS
Bartolo Colón	P

On Opening Day, the Mets faced the Washington Nationals, whose starting pitcher Max Scherzer held the Mets hitless until the 6th inning. The Mets capitalized on two errors by Washington in the 6th inning: Ian Desmond committed a throwing error and Dan Uggla dropped a David Wright pop-up. Lucas Duda finished off the rally with a two-run single into the right-center gap off a 98-MPH fastball from Scherzer. Mets starter Bartolo Colón allowed only a solo home run to Bryce Harper. After Colón left the game, Buddy Carlyle, filling in for an injured Jenrry Mejía, earned the save, giving the Mets a 3–1 victory.

=== April ===
After their opening series in Washington, former closer Jenrry Mejía was suspended 80 games for the use of stanozolol, a performance-enhancing drug (PED) banned by MLB. The Mets lost three of their first five games. After losing the first two in Atlanta to start their second series, the Mets began an 11-game win streak that started with Colón picking up his second win. The Mets then returned home, and swept the Philadelphia Phillies, Miami Marlins, and Atlanta Braves. On April 23, the Mets beat the Braves 6–3 to complete a perfect 10 game homestand, tying their start to the 1986 season with a 13–3 record and tying the team record with an 11-game winning streak. During the 8th game of the season, David Wright pulled his hamstring while stealing a base. He left the game and Anthony Recker was brought in to play third base. After a number of weeks, Wright was diagnosed with spinal stenosis, raising questions as to whether the captain could ever return. During the 11 game winning streak, catcher Travis d'Arnaud was hit by a pitch, leading to a wrist injury. Kevin Plawecki was called up to replace d'Arnaud. In the same game, relief pitcher Jerry Blevins was hit by a line drive, breaking his arm. Their winning streak was broken against the New York Yankees in the first game of the Subway Series, where Jacob deGrom lost to Michael Pineda. The next day, in the second game of the series, Matt Harvey pitched 8.2 innings, but after giving up back-to-back hits, Harvey was taken out of the game. He would still get the victory. No Met would pitch a complete game until September. The Mets then lost the rubber match of the series against the Yankees, their first appearance on ESPN Sunday Night Baseball since the 2013 season.

=== May ===
In May, the Nationals took the division lead after taking three of four games from the Mets at Citi Field to start the month. Bartolo Colón saw his ERA increase to 4.80 at one point, effectively ending his All-Star chances. Noah Syndergaard was called up in mid-May and made his Major League debut on May 12 against the Chicago Cubs. However, the Mets lost 6–1 in part of a four-game sweep by the Cubs at Wrigley Field. The Mets then returned home for a weekend series against the Milwaukee Brewers, winning two out of three. On Saturday, the Mets scored 14 runs, scoring 10 in the 4th inning, which included a grand slam hit by Wilmer Flores. Syndergaard picked up his first major league win on Sunday as the Mets won 5–1. In the following week, they split a four-game series with the St. Louis Cardinals and were swept by the Pittsburgh Pirates. While they started the final week of May by sweeping the Phillies, they closed the month by losing a series to the Marlins, ending May with a 28–23 record.

=== June ===
The Mets began the month with a seven-game road trip by losing a series in San Diego and splitting a series in Arizona. Returning home, they were no-hit by San Francisco Giants pitcher Chris Heston on June 9, earning the Giants a 5–0 victory. The no-hitter would turn out to be the first of two thrown against the Mets in 2015. New York rebounded to win a weekend series against the Atlanta Braves, and also snapped the Toronto Blue Jays' 11-game winning streak, which matched the Mets' 11-game streak as the longest winning streak of the year, by beating them on a walk-off hit by Wilmer Flores. After another win the following day, the Mets retook the division lead again. They then lost their next seven games in a row to fall back to under .500, at 36–37. Facing the Brewers, Jacob deGrom ended the losing streak by pitching 8 shutout innings to get the Mets a 2–0 victory and get them back to .500 returning home for a three-game set with the Cincinnati Reds.

On June 28, left-handed pitching prospect Steven Matz, a native of Stony Brook, New York and a lifelong Mets fan, made his Major League debut for the Mets against the Reds. He recorded four runs batted in (RBIs), breaking the Mets' franchise record for RBIs in a major league debut and setting an MLB record for most RBI by a pitcher in their debut. He went on to get the win in that game. Matz was the first pitcher from Long Island to make his MLB debut with the Mets since Ray Searage in 1981. With the win, the Mets swept the Reds to end June with a 40–38 record.

=== July ===
The Mets opened July by getting swept by the Chicago Cubs at Citi Field. In the three-game series, the Mets scored only one run. The team lost 6–1 on Thursday afternoon to drop to 40–40. After the game, local news pundits tore into the Wilpons' ownership of the team and GM Sandy Alderson not admitting there was a problem with the offense. Alderson then addressed the media and dubbed the reporters "residents of Panic City". Panic City became a popular term referring to Mets fans, especially on social media. After the sweep, the Mets went 4–2 on a road trip to the West Coast in Los Angeles and San Francisco. They followed this with a sweep of the Arizona Diamondbacks at Citi Field that brought the team's record to 47–42 heading into the 2015 All-Star break. In the final game of the series, Kirk Nieuwenhuis became the tenth Met to hit three home runs in one game and the first player in Mets history to hit three home runs in one home game; the previous nine did so on the road. On July 24, the Mets acquired Kelly Johnson and Juan Uribe in a trade with the Atlanta Braves for minor league pitchers John Gant and Rob Whalen.

On July 29, the Mets were involved in a bizarre series of events where it was reported through various social media outlets that Wilmer Flores had been traded, along with Zack Wheeler to the Milwaukee Brewers in exchange for outfielder Carlos Gómez, as part of the Mets' desire to bring in an outfield bat. Word spread quickly around the stadium, and eventually to Flores, who took the field in the 8th inning crying and visibly emotional. After the game, general manager Sandy Alderson confirmed with the media that the trade had fallen through due to either medical concerns or disagreements on money, meaning Flores and Wheeler remained Mets. The next day, Flores was on the bench while the Mets tried to put the previous night behind them, leading the San Diego Padres 7–1 in the 7th inning. However, Derek Norris cut into the lead with a grand slam off Hansel Robles, but the newly acquired reliever Tyler Clippard sent the game into the 9th with the Mets retaining a 7–5 lead. Jeurys Familia came in to close the game, but with two outs and one strike on Norris, a heavy rainfall prompted the umpires to delay the game. After the delay, Norris blooped an 0–2 single to right field, Matt Kemp grounded a single to left field, and Justin Upton provided the final blow, homering to give the Padres an 8–7 lead, which would hold up.

Following the defeat, the Mets faced the Washington Nationals in a three-game series. The Nationals were three games ahead of the Mets, and a New York sweep could give the Mets the division lead. Prior to the first game, the Mets acquired outfielder Yoenis Céspedes, in a trade with the Detroit Tigers for minor league pitchers Michael Fulmer and Luis Cessa. That night, Flores hit a walk-off home run in the 12th inning, winning the game for the Mets by a score of 2–1. Flores had also driven in the other Mets run earlier in the game. It was also the only walk-off home run the Mets hit that season.

=== August ===
The Mets started August by sweeping the Washington Nationals and the Miami Marlins. They regained the lead in the National League East on August 3 and did not relinquish it for the rest of the season. On August 21, Céspedes became the 11th Met in franchise history and the third Met in 2015 to hit three home runs in a game when he did so against the Colorado Rockies. This feat was achieved early in the season by Lucas Duda and Kirk Nieuwenhuis.

On August 24 against the Philadelphia Phillies, David Wright played in his first game since April 14, having missed over four months due to a hamstring injury and a career-threatening bout of spinal stenosis. Wright hit a home run into the second deck in his first at-bat, which would be the first of eight Met home runs in the game, setting a new franchise record in their 16–7 win. The Mets also hit 45 home runs in August, setting the club record for most home runs in a calendar month.

The Mets finished the month of August with a 20–8 record, their first month with at least 20 wins since September 2000.

=== September ===
The Mets swept a three-game series in Washington against the Nationals, coming from behind in each game to do so. This sweep increased their division lead, which they would not relinquish, to seven games, effectively ending the chances of a Nationals comeback.

On September 26, the Mets clinched the National League East title for the first time since 2006, after defeating the Cincinnati Reds 10–2.

=== October ===
The Mets were the favorites to earn a home-field advantage over the Los Angeles Dodgers in the Division Series, but finished 1–5 to end the season. This included being swept by the Phillies and dropping a series against the Nationals, which included a no-hitter thrown by Max Scherzer on October 3, which was the second one thrown against the Mets all season. The next day, however, the Mets won 1–0. Jacob deGrom pitched 4 shutout innings and the Mets took a combined no-hitter into the 8th, but Clint Robinson singled off Jon Niese to end it. Curtis Granderson then homered for the only run of the game, and Jeurys Familia earned his 43rd save of the year, tying a club record previously held by Armando Benítez, who recorded 43 saves in 2001. The win also gave the Mets 90 victories, which Sandy Alderson had predicted of the team in 2014. The club ended the regular season with a record of 90–72, making the playoffs for the first time since 2006.

The Mets played the Los Angeles Dodgers in the 2015 National League Division Series, winning in five games. Second baseman Daniel Murphy hit three home runs in the series. The Mets then swept the Chicago Cubs in the 2015 National League Championship Series. Murphy was named the NLCS Most Valuable Player, after he batted .529 in the series and homered in each of the 4 games, bringing his consecutive postseason game home run streak to six games, an MLB postseason record. Murphy homered a total of seven times in the two series. The Mets would lose in five games to the Kansas City Royals in the 2015 World Series. It was the first World Series to feature two expansion teams established after 1960. Game 5 was the first game in Mets franchise history to occur in the month of November.

The 2015 World Series was also the only time in the 2010s decade that a New York team played in a World Series, meaning that the Yankees didn't reach the World Series at all during the decade.

=== Detailed record ===
Team	Home	Away	Total	Win %
NL East
Atlanta Braves	6–3	5–5	11–8	.579
Miami Marlins	6–4	5–4	11–8	.579
Philadelphia Phillies	8–1	6–4	14–5	.737
Washington Nationals	5–5	6–3	11–8	.579
	25–13	22–16	47–29	.618
NL Central
Chicago Cubs	0–3	0–4	0–7	.000
Cincinnati Reds	3–0	4–0	7–0	1.000
Milwaukee Brewers	2–1	1–2	3–3	.500
Pittsburgh Pirates	0–3	0–3	0–6	.000
St. Louis Cardinals	2–2	1–2	3–4	.429
	7–9	6–11	13–20	.394
NL West
Arizona Diamondbacks	3–0	2–2	5–2	.714
Colorado Rockies	4–0	3–0	7–0	1.000
Los Angeles Dodgers	2–2	2–1	4–3	.571
San Diego Padres	1–2	1–2	2–4	.333
San Francisco Giants	1–2	2–1	3–3	.500
	11–6	10–6	21–12	.636
American League
Baltimore Orioles	2–0	1–1	3–1	.750
Boston Red Sox	1–2	N/A	1–2	.333
New York Yankees	1–2	1–2	2–4	.333
Tampa Bay Rays	N/A	1–2	1–2	.333
Toronto Blue Jays	2–0	0–2	2–2	.500
	6–4	3–7	9–11	.450

Month	Games	Won	Lost	Win %
April	23	15	8	.652
May	28	13	15	.464
June	27	12	15	.444
July	25	13	12	.520
August	28	20	8	.714
September	27	16	11	.593
October	4	1	3	.250
Overall:	162	90	72	.556

	Games	Won	Lost	Win %
Home	81	49	32	.605
Away	81	41	40	.506

- Most Runs Scored in a game: 16 (8/24 vs. PHI)
- Most Runs Allowed in a game: 14 (9/1 vs. PHI)
- Most Hits in a Game: 21 (7/25 vs. LAD)
- Longest Winning Streak: 11 games (4/12–4/23) Ties franchise record
- Longest Losing Streak: 7 games (6/17–6/24)

== Season standings ==
=== National League East ===
NL East
Team	W	L	Pct.	GB	Home	Road
New York Mets	90	72	.556	—	49‍–‍32	41‍–‍40
Washington Nationals	83	79	.512	7	46‍–‍35	37‍–‍44
Miami Marlins	71	91	.438	19	41‍–‍40	30‍–‍51
Atlanta Braves	67	95	.414	23	42‍–‍39	25‍–‍56
Philadelphia Phillies	63	99	.389	27	37‍–‍44	26‍–‍55

=== National League division leaders ===
Division leaders
Team	W	L	Pct.
St. Louis Cardinals	100	62	.617
Los Angeles Dodgers	92	70	.568
New York Mets	90	72	.556

Wild Card teams (Top 2 teams qualify for postseason)
Team	W	L	Pct.	GB
Pittsburgh Pirates	98	64	.605	+1
Chicago Cubs	97	65	.599	—
San Francisco Giants	84	78	.519	13
Washington Nationals	83	79	.512	14
Arizona Diamondbacks	79	83	.488	18
San Diego Padres	74	88	.457	23
Miami Marlins	71	91	.438	26
Milwaukee Brewers	68	94	.420	29
Colorado Rockies	68	94	.420	29
Atlanta Braves	67	95	.414	30
Cincinnati Reds	64	98	.395	33
Philadelphia Phillies	63	99	.389	34

=== Record vs. opponents ===
2015 National League record Source: MLB Standings Grid – 2015
Team	AZ	ATL	CHC	CIN	COL	LAD	MIA	MIL	NYM	PHI	PIT	SD	SF	STL	WSH	AL
Arizona	—	3–3	2–4	6–1	13–6	6–13	5–2	5–2	2–5	2–4	1–5	9–10	11–8	0–7	3–4	11–9
Atlanta	3–3	—	1–6	3–4	1–6	3–3	10–9	5–2	8–11	11–8	2–4	2–5	3–4	4–2	5–14	6–14
Chicago	4–2	6–1	—	13–6	4–2	3–4	3–3	14–5	7–0	2–5	11–8	3–3	5–2	8–11	4–3	10–10
Cincinnati	1–6	4–3	6–13	—	2–4	1–6	3–4	9–10	0–7	4–2	11–8	2–4	2–5	7–12	5–1	7–13
Colorado	6–13	6–1	2–4	4–2	—	8–11	2–5	5–1	0–7	5–2	1–6	7–12	11–8	3–4	3–3	5–15
Los Angeles	13–6	3–3	4–3	6–1	11–8	—	4–2	4–3	3–4	5–2	1–5	14–5	8–11	2–5	4–2	10–10
Miami	2–5	9–10	3–3	4–3	5–2	2–4	—	4–2	8–11	9–10	1–6	2–5	5–2	1–5	9–10	7–13
Milwaukee	2–5	2–5	5–14	10–9	1–5	3–4	2–4	—	3–3	7–0	10–9	5–2	1–5	6–13	3–4	8–12
New York	5–2	11–8	0–7	7–0	7–0	4–3	11–8	3–3	—	14–5	0–6	2–4	3–3	3–4	11–8	9–11
Philadelphia	4–2	8–11	5–2	2–4	2–5	2–5	10–9	0–7	5–14	—	2–5	5–1	1–5	2–5	7–12	8–12
Pittsburgh	5–1	4–2	8–11	8–11	6–1	5–1	6–1	9–10	6–0	5–2	—	5–2	6–1	9–10	3–4	13–7
San Diego	10–9	5–2	3–3	4–2	12–7	5–14	5–2	2–5	4–2	1–5	2–5	—	8–11	4–3	2–5	7–13
San Francisco	8–11	4–3	2–5	5–2	8–11	11–8	2–5	5–1	3–3	5–1	1–6	11–8	—	2–4	4–3	13–7
St. Louis	7–0	2–4	11–8	12–7	4–3	5–2	5–1	13–6	4–3	5–2	10–9	3–4	4–2	—	4–2	11–9
Washington	4–3	14–5	3–4	1–5	3–3	2–4	10–9	4–3	8–11	12–7	4–3	5–2	3–4	2–4	—	8–12

== Game log ==
=== Regular season ===
Legend
Mets Win	Mets Loss	Game Postponed	All-Star Game	Clinched division
Bold = Mets team member

2015 Game Log
Overall: 90–72 (Home: 49–32; Away: 41–40)
April: 15–8 (Home: 10–1; Away: 5–7)

#	Date	Opponent	Box Score	Win	Loss	Save	Location (Attendance)	Record
1	April 6	@Nationals	3–1	**Bartolo Colón** (1–0)	Max Scherzer (0–1)	**Buddy Carlyle** (1)	Nationals Park (42,295)	1–0
2	April 8	@Nationals	1–2	Jordan Zimmermann (1–0)	**Jacob deGrom** (0–1)	Drew Storen (1)	Nationals Park (25,999)	1–1
3	April 9	@Nationals	6–3	**Matt Harvey** (1–0)	Stephen Strasburg (0–1)		Nationals Park (25,327)	2–1
4	April 10	@Braves	3–5	Jim Johnson (1–0)	**Rafael Montero** (0–1)	Jason Grilli (3)	Turner Field (46,279)	2–2
5	April 11	@Braves	3–5	Julio Teherán (2–0)	**Dillon Gee** (0–1)	Jim Johnson (1)	Turner Field (36,056)	2–3
6	April 12	@Braves	4–3	**Bartolo Colón** (2–0)	Juan Jaime (0–1)	**Jeurys Familia** (1)	Turner Field (28,192)	3–3
7	April 13	Phillies	2–0	**Jacob deGrom** (1–1)	Aaron Harang (1–1)	**Jeurys Familia** (2)	Citi Field (43,947)	4–3
8	April 14	Phillies	6–5	**Matt Harvey** (2–0)	David Buchanan (0–2)	**Jeurys Familia** (3)	Citi Field (39,489)	5–3
9	April 15	Phillies	6–1	**Jon Niese** (1–0)	Jerome Williams (0–1)		Citi Field (21,052)	6–3
10	April 16	Marlins	7–5	**Jerry Blevins** (1–0)	Mike Dunn (0–1)	**Jeurys Familia** (4)	Citi Field (20,556)	7–3
11	April 17	Marlins	4–1	**Bartolo Colón** (3–0)	Brad Hand (0–1)	**Jeurys Familia** (5)	Citi Field (38,753)	8–3
12	April 18	Marlins	5–4	**Jacob deGrom** (2–1)	Mat Latos (0–3)	**Alex Torres** (1)	Citi Field (41,844)	9–3
13	April 19	Marlins	7–6	**Matt Harvey** (3–0)	Tom Koehler (1–2)	**Jeurys Familia** (6)	Citi Field (41,234)	10–3
14	April 21	Braves	7–1	**Jon Niese** (2–0)	Trevor Cahill (0–2)		Citi Field (21,033)	11–3
15	April 22	Braves	3–2	**Buddy Carlyle** (1–0)	Jim Johnson (1–1)	**Jeurys Familia** (7)	Citi Field (20,971)	12–3
16	April 23	Braves	6–3	**Bartolo Colón** (4–0)	Julio Teherán (2–1)	**Jeurys Familia** (8)	Citi Field (23,980)	13–3
17	April 24	@Yankees	1–6	Michael Pineda (3–0)	**Jacob deGrom** (2–2)		Yankee Stadium (45,310)	13–4
18	April 25	@Yankees	8–2	**Matt Harvey** (4–0)	CC Sabathia (0–4)		Yankee Stadium (47,909)	14–4
19	April 26	@Yankees	4–6	Chasen Shreve (1–0)	**Jon Niese** (2–1)	Andrew Miller (7)	Yankee Stadium (47,510)	14–5
20	April 27	@Marlins	3–1	**Carlos Torres** (1–0)	Steve Cishek (0–1)	**Jeurys Familia** (9)	Marlins Park (18,547)	15–5
21	April 28	@Marlins	3–4	Bryan Morris (3–0)	**Carlos Torres** (1–1)	Steve Cishek (2)	Marlins Park (17,255)	15–6
22	April 29	@Marlins	3–4	Sam Dyson (1–0)	**Bartolo Colón** (4–1)		Marlins Park (17,076)	15–7
23	April 30	Nationals	2–8	Stephen Strasburg (2–2)	**Jacob deGrom** (2–3)		Citi Field (21,689)	15–8

May: 13–15 (Home: 11–7; Away: 2–8)

#	Date	Opponent	Box Score	Win	Loss	Save	Location (Attendance)	Record
24	May 1	Nationals	4–0	**Matt Harvey** (5–0)	Max Scherzer (1–3)	**Jeurys Familia** (10)	Citi Field (33,178)	16–8
25	May 2	Nationals	0–1	Gio González (2–2)	**Jon Niese** (2–2)	Drew Storen (6)	Citi Field (39,730)	16–9
26	May 3	Nationals	0–1	Doug Fister (2–1)	**Dillon Gee** (0–2)	Drew Storen (7)	Citi Field (41,048)	16–10
27	May 5	Orioles	3–2	**Bartolo Colón** (5–1)	Bud Norris (1–3)	**Jeurys Familia** (11)	Citi Field (20,534)	17–10
28	May 6	Orioles	5–1	**Jacob deGrom** (3–3)	Ubaldo Jiménez (2–2)		Citi Field (21,667)	18–10
29	May 8	@Phillies	1−3	Cole Hamels (2−3)	**Matt Harvey** (5−1)	Jonathan Papelbon (6)	Citizens Bank Park (32,734)	18–11
30	May 9	@Phillies	3−2	**Jon Niese** (3−2)	Aaron Harang (3−3)	**Jeurys Familia** (12)	Citizens Bank Park (29,373)	19–11
31	May 10	@Phillies	7–4	**Bartolo Colón** (6–1)	Chad Billingsley (0–2)	**Jeurys Familia** (13)	Citizens Bank Park (27,935)	20–11
32	May 11	@Cubs	3–4	Jon Lester (3–2)	**Jacob deGrom** (3–4)	Héctor Rondón (7)	Wrigley Field (32,980)	20–12
33	May 12	@Cubs	1–6	Jake Arrieta (3–2)	**Noah Syndergaard** (0–1)		Wrigley Field (31,542)	20–13
34	May 13	@Cubs	1–2	Héctor Rondón (2–0)	**Carlos Torres** (1–2)		Wrigley Field (33,709)	20–14
35	May 14	@Cubs	5–6	Pedro Strop (1–2)	**Jon Niese** (3−3)	Héctor Rondón (8)	Wrigley Field (31,496)	20–15
36	May 15	Brewers	0–7	Kyle Lohse (3–4)	**Bartolo Colón** (6–2)		Citi Field (27,554)	20–16
37	May 16	Brewers	14–1	**Jacob deGrom** (4–4)	Matt Garza (2–5)		Citi Field (30,208)	21–16
38	May 17	Brewers	5–1	**Noah Syndergaard** (1–1)	Wily Peralta (1–5)		Citi Field (32,422)	22–16
39	May 18	Cardinals	2–1 (14)	**Carlos Torres** (2–2)	Sam Tuivailala (0–1)		Citi Field (23,338)	23–16
40	May 19	Cardinals	2–10	Michael Wacha (6–0)	**Jon Niese** (3−4)		Citi Field (21,157)	23–17
41	May 20	Cardinals	0–9	Carlos Martínez (4–2)	**Bartolo Colón** (6–3)		Citi Field (23,726)	23–18
42	May 21	Cardinals	5–0	**Jacob deGrom** (5–4)	Jaime García (0–1)		Citi Field (32,783)	24–18
43	May 22	@Pirates	1–4	Gerrit Cole (6–2)	**Noah Syndergaard** (1–2)	Mark Melancon (10)	PNC Park (33,337)	24–19
44	May 23	@Pirates	2–8	A. J. Burnett (4–1)	**Matt Harvey** (5–2)		PNC Park (39,385)	24–20
45	May 24	@Pirates	1–9	Francisco Liriano (2–4)	**Jon Niese** (3−5)		PNC Park (37,784)	24–21
46	May 25	Phillies	6–3	**Bartolo Colón** (7–3)	Elvis Araújo (1–1)	**Jeurys Familia** (14)	Citi Field (30,946)	25–21
47	May 26	Phillies	5–4 (10)	**Jeurys Familia** (1–0)	Jeanmar Gómez (0–1)		Citi Field (21,064)	26–21
48	May 27	Phillies	7–0	**Noah Syndergaard** (2–2)	Sean O'Sullivan (1–4)		Citi Field (24,406)	27–21
49	May 29	Marlins	3–4	Dan Haren (5–2)	**Matt Harvey** (5–3)	A. J. Ramos (3)	Citi Field (33,880)	27–22
50	May 30	Marlins	5–9	Mike Dunn (1–3)	**Hansel Robles** (0–1)	A. J. Ramos (4)	Citi Field (39,095)	27–23
51	May 31	Marlins	4–3	**Bartolo Colón** (8–3)	Steve Cishek (1–5)	**Jeurys Familia** (15)	Citi Field (28,711)	28–23

June: 12–15 (Home: 8–4; Away: 4–11)

#	Date	Opponent	Box Score	Win	Loss	Save	Location (Attendance)	Record
52	June 1	@Padres	7–0	**Jacob deGrom** (6–4)	Andrew Cashner (2–8)		Petco Park (21,893)	29–23
53	June 2	@Padres	2–7	Ian Kennedy (3–5)	**Noah Syndergaard** (2–3)		Petco Park (22,264)	29–24
54	June 3	@Padres	3–7	James Shields (7–0)	**Dillon Gee** (0–3)		Petco Park (24,398)	29–25
55	June 4	@Diamondbacks	6–2	**Matt Harvey** (6–3)	Dominic Leone (0–5)	**Jeurys Familia** (16)	Chase Field (18,954)	30–25
56	June 5	@Diamondbacks	2–7	Jeremy Hellickson (4–3)	**Jon Niese** (3–6)		Chase Field (24,332)	30–26
57	June 6	@Diamondbacks	1–2	Randall Delgado (3–2)	**Bartolo Colón** (8–4)	Brad Ziegler (7)	Chase Field (30,265)	30–27
58	June 7	@Diamondbacks	6–3	**Jacob deGrom** (7–4)	Josh Collmenter (3–6)	**Jeurys Familia** (17)	Chase Field (31,575)	31–27
59	June 9	Giants	0–5	Chris Heston (6–4)	**Noah Syndergaard** (2–4)		Citi Field (23,155)	31–28
60	June 10	Giants	5–8	Tim Hudson (4–5)	**Matt Harvey** (6–4)	Santiago Casilla (18)	Citi Field (24,436)	31–29
61	June 11	Giants	5–4	**Jeurys Familia** (2–0)	Sergio Romo (0–3)		Citi Field (25,143)	32–29
62	June 12	Braves	5–3	**Bartolo Colón** (9–4)	Alex Wood (4–4)	**Jeurys Familia** (18)	Citi Field (32,554)	33–29
63	June 13	Braves	3–5 (11)	Jason Grilli (2–2)	**Carlos Torres** (2–3)	Williams Pérez (1)	Citi Field (37,734)	33–30
64	June 14	Braves	10–8	**Sean Gilmartin** (1–0)	Luis Avilán (2–2)	**Jeurys Familia** (19)	Citi Field (36,340)	34–30
65	June 15	Blue Jays	4–3 (11)	**Hansel Robles** (1–1)	Brett Cecil (1–3)		Citi Field (22,172)	35–30
66	June 16	Blue Jays	3–2	**Matt Harvey** (7–4)	Scott Copeland (1–1)	**Bobby Parnell** (1)	Citi Field (24,522)	36–30
67	June 17	@Blue Jays	0–8	Drew Hutchison (6–1)	**Jonathon Niese** (3–7)		Rogers Centre (28,906)	36–31
68	June 18	@Blue Jays	1–7	R. A. Dickey (3–6)	**Bartolo Colón** (9–5)		Rogers Centre (27,588)	36–32
69	June 19	@Braves	1–2	Matt Wisler (1–0)	**Jacob deGrom** (7–5)	Jason Grilli (19)	Turner Field (28,853)	36–33
70	June 20	@Braves	4–6	Williams Perez (4–0)	**Jack Leathersich** (0–1)	Jason Grilli (20)	Turner Field (40,733)	36–34
71	June 21	@Braves	0–1	Julio Teherán (5–3)	**Matt Harvey** (7–5)	Jim Johnson (4)	Turner Field (30,268)	36–35
72	June 23	@Brewers	2–3	Will Smith (3–0)	**Hansel Robles** (1–2)	Francisco Rodríguez (14)	Miller Park (25,055)	36–36
73	June 24	@Brewers	1–4	Jimmy Nelson (4–8)	**Bartolo Colón** (9–6)	Francisco Rodríguez (15)	Miller Park (22,017)	36–37
74	June 25	@Brewers	2–0	**Jacob deGrom** (8–5)	Michael Blazek (4–2)	**Jeurys Familia** (20)	Miller Park (33,354)	37–37
75	June 26	Reds	2–1	**Noah Syndergaard** (3–4)	Johnny Cueto (4–5)	**Jeurys Familia** (21)	Citi Field (28,109)	38–37
76	June 27	Reds	2–1 (13)	**Bobby Parnell** (1–0)	Nate Adcock (0–1)		Citi Field (32,531)	39–37
77	June 28	Reds	7–2	**Steven Matz** (1–0)	Josh Smith (0–1)		Citi Field (29,640)	40–37
78	June 30	Cubs	0–1	Kyle Hendricks (3–4)	**Jonathon Niese** (3–8)	Jason Motte (3)	Citi Field (27,084)	40–38

July: 13–12 (Home: 7–6; Away: 6–6)

#	Date	Opponent	Box Score	Win	Loss	Save	Location (Attendance)	Record
79	July 1	Cubs	0–2	Jason Motte (6–1)	**Carlos Torres** (2–4)	Justin Grimm (1)	Citi Field (23,906)	40–39
80	July 2	Cubs	1–6	Jake Arrieta (8–5)	**Jacob deGrom** (8–6)		Citi Field (27,207)	40–40
81	July 3	@Dodgers	2–1	**Hansel Robles** (2–2)	Kenley Jansen (2–1)	**Jeurys Familia** (22)	Dodger Stadium (52,570)	41–40
82	July 4	@Dodgers	3–4	Zack Greinke (7–2)	**Matt Harvey** (7–6)	J.P. Howell (1)	Dodger Stadium (51,252)	41–41
83	July 5	@Dodgers	8–0	**Steven Matz** (2–0)	Mike Bolsinger (4–3)	**Logan Verrett** (1)	Dodger Stadium (40,027)	42–41
84	July 6	@Giants	3–0	**Jon Niese** (4–8)	Sergio Romo (0–4)	**Jeurys Familia** (23)	AT&T Park (42,247)	43–41
85	July 7	@Giants	0–3	Matt Cain (1–1)	**Bartolo Colón** (9–7)	Santiago Casilla (21)	AT&T Park (42,164)	43–42
86	July 8	@Giants	4–1	**Jacob deGrom** (9–6)	Jake Peavy (0–4)	**Jeurys Familia** (24)	AT&T Park (41,914)	44–42
87	July 10	Diamondbacks	4–2	**Noah Syndergaard** (4–4)	Chase Anderson (4–3)	**Jeurys Familia** (25)	Citi Field (28,243)	45–42
88	July 11	Diamondbacks	4–2	**Matt Harvey** (8–6)	Patrick Corbin (1–1)	**Jeurys Familia** (26)	Citi Field (36,038)	46–42
89	July 12	Diamondbacks	5–3	**Jon Niese** (5–8)	Rubby De La Rosa (6–5)	**Jeurys Familia** (27)	Citi Field (28,259)	47–42
	July 14	A.L. @ N.L.	2015 Major League Baseball All-Star Game				Great American Ball Park	
90	July 17	@Cardinals	2–3	Lance Lynn (7–5)	**Noah Syndergaard** (4–5)	Trevor Rosenthal (27)	Busch Stadium (44,540)	47–43
91	July 18	@Cardinals	2–12	John Lackey (8–5)	**Bartolo Colón** (9–8)		Busch Stadium (45,852)	47–44
92	July 19	@Cardinals	3–1 (18)	**Carlos Torres** (3–4)	Carlos Martínez (10–4)		Busch Stadium (43,194)	48–44
93	July 20	@Nationals	2–7	Gio González (7–4)	**Matt Harvey** (8–7)		Nationals Park (31,326)	48–45
94	July 21	@Nationals	7–2	**Jacob DeGrom** (10–6)	Joe Ross (2–2)		Nationals Park (37,721)	49–45
95	July 22	@Nationals	3–4	Matt Thornton (1–0)	**Bobby Parnell** (1–1)	Drew Storen (29)	Nationals Park (41,291)	49–46
96	July 23	Dodgers	0–3	Clayton Kershaw (8–6)	**Bartolo Colón** (9–9)		Citi Field (34,222)	49–47
97	July 24	Dodgers	2–7	Ian Thomas (1–1)	**Jon Niese** (5–9)		Citi Field (36,066)	49–48
98	July 25	Dodgers	15–2	**Matt Harvey** (9–7)	Zach Lee (0–1)		Citi Field (39,744)	50–48
99	July 26	Dodgers	3–2	**Jenrry Mejía** (1–0)	Juan Nicasio (1–3)		Citi Field (36,093)	51–48
100	July 28	Padres	4–0	**Noah Syndergaard** (5–5)	James Shields (8–4)		Citi Field (26,034)	52–48
101	July 29	Padres	3–7	Tyson Ross (7–8)	**Bartolo Colón** (9–10)		Citi Field (24,804)	52–49
102	July 30	Padres	7–8	Marcos Mateo (1–0)	**Jeurys Familia** (2–1)	Craig Kimbrel (30)	Citi Field (35,604)	52–50
103	July 31	Nationals	2–1 (12)	**Carlos Torres** (4–4)	Felipe Rivero (1–1)		Citi Field (36,164)	53–50

August: 20–8 (Home: 8–5; Away: 12–3)

#	Date	Opponent	Box Score	Win	Loss	Save	Location (Attendance)	Record
104	August 1	Nationals	3–2	**Hansel Robles** (3–2)	Matt Thornton (1–1)	**Jeurys Familia** (28)	Citi Field (42,996)	54–50
105	August 2	Nationals	5–2	**Noah Syndergaard** (6–5)	Jordan Zimmermann (8–7)	**Tyler Clippard** (18)	Citi Field (35,374)	55–50
106	August 3	@Marlins	12–1	**Bartolo Colón** (10–10)	Tom Koehler (8–8)		Marlins Park (23,119)	56–50
107	August 4	@Marlins	5–1	**Jon Niese** (6–9)	Mike Dunn (1–5)		Marlins Park (23,882)	57–50
108	August 5	@Marlins	8–6	**Matt Harvey** (10–7)	David Phelps (4–8)	**Jeurys Familia** (29)	Marlins Park (25,897)	58–50
109	August 7	@Rays	4–3	**Tyler Clippard** (2–3)	Brad Boxberger (4–8)	**Jeurys Familia** (30)	Tropicana Field (23,145)	59–50
110	August 8	@Rays	4–5	Nathan Karns (7–5)	**Noah Syndergaard** (6–6)	Brad Boxberger (28)	Tropicana Field (31,042)	59–51
111	August 9	@Rays	3–4	Xavier Cedeno (2–1)	**Bartolo Colón** (10–11)	Jake McGee (6)	Tropicana Field (26,681)	59–52
112	August 10	Rockies	4–2	**Jon Niese** (7–9)	Justin Miller (1–1)	**Jeurys Familia** (31)	Citi Field (27,194)	60–52
113	August 11	Rockies	4–0	**Matt Harvey** (11–7)	Chris Rusin (3–5)		Citi Field (25,611)	61–52
114	August 12	Rockies	3–0	**Jacob deGrom** (11–6)	Jorge de la Rosa (7–5)	**Jeurys Familia** (32)	Citi Field (37,175)	62–52
115	August 13	Rockies	12–3	**Noah Syndergaard** (7–6)	Eddie Butler (3–10)		Citi Field (36,573)	63–52
116	August 14	Pirates	2–3 (10)	Arquimedes Caminero (3–1)	**Bobby Parnell** (1–2)	Mark Melancon (36)	Citi Field (38,495)	63–53
117	August 15	Pirates	3–5 (14)	Joe Blanton (4–2)	**Sean Gilmartin** (1–1)	Mark Melancon (37)	Citi Field (38,878)	63–54
118	August 16	Pirates	1–8	Arquimedes Caminero (4–1)	**Bobby Parnell** (1–3)		Citi Field (40,250)	63–55
119	August 18	@Orioles	5–3	**Jacob deGrom** (12–6)	Kevin Gausman (2–5)	**Jeurys Familia** (33)	Oriole Park at Camden Yards (34,068)	64–55
120	August 19	@Orioles	4–5	Zach Britton (4–0)	**Carlos Torres** (4–5)		Oriole Park at Camden Yards (36,165)	64–56
121	August 21	@Rockies	14–9	**Sean Gilmartin** (2–1)	Christian Friedrich (0–4)		Coors Field (31,079)	65–56
122	August 22	@Rockies	14–9	**Jon Niese** (8–9)	Chris Rusin (4–6)		Coors Field (46,170)	66–56
123	August 23	@Rockies	5–1	**Logan Verrett** (1–1)	David Hale (3–5)		Coors Field (33,200)	67–56
124	August 24	@Phillies	16–7	**Sean Gilmartin** (3–1)	Héctor Neris (2–1)		Citizens Bank Park (23,744)	68–56
125	August 25	@Phillies	6–5	**Noah Syndergaard** (8–6)	Jerome Williams (4–10)	**Jeurys Familia** (34)	Citizens Bank Park (23,544)	69–56
126	August 26	@Phillies	9–4	**Bartolo Colón** (11–11)	Jerad Eickhoff (1–1)	**Tyler Clippard** (19)	Citizens Bank Park (22,184)	70–56
127	August 27	@Phillies	9–5 (13)	**Carlos Torres** (5–5)	Hectro Neris (2–2)		Citizens Bank Park (22,526)	71–56
128	August 28	Red Sox	4–6 (10)	Tommy Layne (1–1)	**Carlos Torres** (5–6)	Craig Breslow (1)	Citi Field (39,401)	71–57
129	August 29	Red Sox	1–3	Joe Kelly (8–6)	**Jacob deGrom** (12–7)	Jean Machi (3)	Citi Field (43,255)	71–58
130	August 30	Red Sox	5–4	**Tyler Clippard** (3–3)	Robbie Ross, Jr. (0–2)	**Jeurys Familia** (35)	Citi Field (38,938)	72–58
131	August 31	Phillies	3–1	**Bartolo Colón** (12–11)	Jared Eickhoff (1–2)	**Jeurys Familia** (36)	Citi Field (34,233)	73–58

September: 16–11 (Home: 4–7; Away: 12–4)

#	Date	Opponent	Box Score	Win	Loss	Save	Location (Attendance)	Record
132	September 1	Phillies	8–14	Jeanmar Gómez (2–3)	**Jon Niese** (8–10)		Citi Field (30,104)	73–59
133	September 2	Phillies	9–4	**Matt Harvey** (12–7)	Aaron Nola (5–2)		Citi Field (32,464)	74–59
134	September 4	@Marlins	5–6 (11)	Brian Ellington (1–0)	**Erik Goeddel** (0–1)		Marlins Park (24,763)	74–60
135	September 5	@Marlins	7–0	**Bartolo Colón** (13–11)	Brad Hand (4–5)		Marlins Park (23,135)	75–60
136	September 6	@Marlins	3–4	A.J. Ramos (2–4)	**Tyler Clippard** (3–4)		Marlins Park (26,780)	75–61
137	September 7	@Nationals	8–5	**Darío Álvarez** (1–0)	Blake Treinen (2–3)	**Jeurys Familia** (37)	Nationals Park (34,210)	76–61
138	September 8	@Nationals	8–7	**Addison Reed** (3–2)	Jonathan Papelbon (3–2)	**Jeurys Familia** (38)	Nationals Park (27,507)	77–61
139	September 9	@Nationals	5–3	**Jacob deGrom** (13–7)	Stephen Strasburg (8–7)	**Jeurys Familia** (39)	Nationals Park (27,530)	78–61
140	September 10	@Braves	7–2	**Bartolo Colón** (14–11)	Shelby Miller (5–14)		Turner Field (22,640)	79–61
141	September 11	@Braves	5–1	**Steven Matz** (3–0)	Matt Wisler (5–7)		Turner Field (23,216)	80–61
142	September 12	@Braves	6–4	**Tyler Clippard** (4–4)	Arodys Vizcaíno (2–1)	**Jeurys Familia** (40)	Turner Field (27,380)	81–61
143	September 13	@Braves	10–7 (10)	**Bobby Parnell** (2–3)	Edwin Jackson (2–3)	**Addison Reed** (4)	Turner Field (23,786)	82–61
144	September 14	Marlins	4–3	**Hansel Robles** (4–2)	Kyle Barraclough (2–1)	**Jeurys Familia** (41)	Citi Field (27,320)	83–61
145	September 15	Marlins	3–9	Tom Koehler (10–13)	**Jacob deGrom** (13–8)		Citi Field (25,633)	83–62
146	September 16	Marlins	0–6	Adam Conley (4–1)	**Bartolo Colón** (14–12)		Citi Field (25,161)	83–63
147	September 18	Yankees	5–1	**Steven Matz** (4–0)	Masahiro Tanaka (12–7)		Citi Field (43,602)	84–63
148	September 19	Yankees	0–5	Michael Pineda (11–8)	**Noah Syndergaard** (8–7)		Citi Field (43,630)	84–64
149	September 20	Yankees	2–11	CC Sabathia (5–9)	**Hansel Robles** (4–3)		Citi Field (43,571)	84–65
150	September 21	Braves	4–0	**Jon Niese** (9–10)	Shelby Miller (5–16)		Citi Field (26,362)	85–65
151	September 22	Braves	2–6	Matt Wisler (6–8)	**Logan Verrett** (1–2)		Citi Field (26,227)	85–66
152	September 23	Braves	3–6	Edwin Jackson (4–3)	**Jeurys Familia** (2–2)	Arodys Vizcaíno (7)	Citi Field (28,931)	85–67
153	September 24	@Reds	6–4	**Erik Goeddel** (1–1)	Manny Parra (1–2)	**Jeurys Familia** (42)	Great American Ball Park (18,881)	86–67
154	September 25	@Reds	12–5	**Noah Syndergaard** (9–7)	Anthony DeSclafani (9–12)		Great American Ball Park (26,780)	87–67
155	September 26	@Reds	10–2	**Matt Harvey** (13–7)	Adam Lamb (1–4)		Great American Ball Park (32,293)	88–67
156	September 27	@Reds	8–1	**Jacob deGrom** (14–8)	Keyvius Sampson (2–6)		Great American Ball Park (24,621)	89–67
157	September 29	@Phillies	3–4	Adam Loewen (1–0)	**Bartolo Colón** (14–13)	Ken Giles (14)	Citizens Bank Park (15,227)	89-68
158	September 30	@Phillies	5–7	Ken Roberts (1–1)	**Bobby Parnell** (2–4)	Ken Giles (15)	Citizens Bank Park (15,201)	89-69

October: 1–3 (Home: 1–2; Away: 0–1)

#	Date	Opponent	Box Score	Win	Loss	Save	Location (Attendance)	Record
159	October 1	@Phillies	0–3	Jerad Eickhoff (3–3)	**Sean Gilmartin** (3–2)	Luis García (2)	Citizens Bank Park (13,238)	89–70
	October 2	Nationals	Postponed (rain); rescheduled for October 3				Citi Field	
160	October 3	Nationals	1–3	Rafael Martin (2–0)	**Addison Reed** (3–3)	Felipe Rivero (2)	Citi Field (39,465)	89–71
161	October 3	Nationals	0–2	Max Scherzer (14–12)	**Matt Harvey** (13–8)		Citi Field (41,480)	89–72
162	October 4	Nationals	1–0	**Tyler Clippard** (5–4)	Blake Treinen (2–5)	**Jeurys Familia** (43)	Citi Field (41,631)	90–72

=== Postseason ===
2015 New York Mets Postseason (8–6)
NL Division Series vs. Los Angeles Dodgers (3–2)

#	Date	Opponent	Score	Win	Loss	Save	Location (Attendance)	Series
1	October 9	@ Dodgers	3–1	**Jacob deGrom** (1–0)	Clayton Kershaw (0–1)	**Jeurys Familia** (1)	Dodger Stadium (54,428)	1–0
2	October 10	@ Dodgers	2–5	Zack Greinke (1–0)	**Noah Syndergaard** (0–1)	Kenley Jansen (1)	Dodger Stadium (54,455)	1–1
3	October 12	Dodgers	13–7	**Matt Harvey** (1–0)	Brett Anderson (0–1)		Citi Field (44,276)	2–1
4	October 13	Dodgers	1–3	Clayton Kershaw (1–1)	**Steven Matz** (0–1)	Kenley Jansen (2)	Citi Field (44,183)	2–2
5	October 15	@ Dodgers	3–2	**Jacob deGrom** (2–0)	Zack Greinke (1–1)	**Jeurys Familia** (2)	Dodger Stadium (54,602)	3–2

NL Championship Series vs. Chicago Cubs (4–0)

#	Date	Opponent	Score	Win	Loss	Save	Location (Attendance)	Series
1	October 17	Cubs	4–2	**Matt Harvey** (2–0)	Jon Lester (0–2)	**Jeurys Familia** (3)	Citi Field (44,287)	1–0
2	October 18	Cubs	4–1	**Noah Syndergaard** (1–1)	Jake Arrieta (2–1)	**Jeurys Familia** (4)	Citi Field (44,502)	2–0
3	October 20	@ Cubs	5–2	**Jacob deGrom** (3–0)	Trevor Cahill (1–1)	**Jeurys Familia** (5)	Wrigley Field (42,231)	3–0
4	October 21	@ Cubs	8–3	**Bartolo Colón** (1–0)	Jason Hammel (0–1)		Wrigley Field (42,227)	4–0

World Series vs. Kansas City Royals (1–4)

#	Date	Opponent	Score	Win	Loss	Save	Location (Attendance)	Series
1	October 27	@ Royals	4–5 (14)	Chris Young (1–0)	**Bartolo Colón** (0–1)		Kauffman Stadium (40,320)	0–1
2	October 28	@ Royals	1–7	Johnny Cueto (1–0)	**Jacob deGrom** (0–1)		Kauffman Stadium (40,410)	0–2
3	October 30	Royals	9–3	**Noah Syndergaard** (1–0)	Yordano Ventura (0–1)		Citi Field (44,781)	1–2
4	October 31	Royals	3–5	Ryan Madson (1–0)	**Tyler Clippard** (0–1)	Wade Davis (1)	Citi Field (44,815)	1–3
5	November 1	Royals	2–7 (12)	Luke Hochevar (1-0)	**Addison Reed** (0-1)		Citi Field (44,859)	1–4

== Postseason rosters ==
Playoff rosters
National League Division Series

- Pitchers: 27 Jeurys Familia 32 Steven Matz 33 Matt Harvey 34 Noah Syndergaard 40 Bartolo Colón 43 Addison Reed 46 Tyler Clippard 47 Hansel Robles 48 Jacob deGrom 49 Jon Niese 62 Erik Goeddel
- Catchers: 7 Travis d'Arnaud 22 Kevin Plawecki
- Infielders: 4 Wilmer Flores 5 David Wright 11 Rubén Tejada (Games 1–2) 21 Lucas Duda 28 Daniel Murphy 55 Kelly Johnson 56 Matt Reynolds (Games 3–5)
- Outfielders: 3 Curtis Granderson 9 Kirk Nieuwenhuis 12 Juan Lagares 23 Michael Cuddyer 30 Michael Conforto 52 Yoenis Céspedes

National League Championship Series

- Pitchers: 27 Jeurys Familia 32 Steven Matz 33 Matt Harvey 34 Noah Syndergaard 36 Sean Gilmartin 40 Bartolo Colón 43 Addison Reed 46 Tyler Clippard 47 Hansel Robles 48 Jacob deGrom 49 Jon Niese
- Catchers: 7 Travis d'Arnaud 22 Kevin Plawecki
- Infielders: 4 Wilmer Flores 5 David Wright 21 Lucas Duda 28 Daniel Murphy 55 Kelly Johnson 56 Matt Reynolds
- Outfielders: 3 Curtis Granderson 9 Kirk Nieuwenhuis 12 Juan Lagares 23 Michael Cuddyer 30 Michael Conforto 52 Yoenis Céspedes

World Series

- Pitchers: 27 Jeurys Familia 32 Steven Matz 33 Matt Harvey 34 Noah Syndergaard 36 Sean Gilmartin 40 Bartolo Colón 43 Addison Reed 46 Tyler Clippard 47 Hansel Robles 48 Jacob deGrom 49 Jon Niese
- Catchers: 7 Travis d'Arnaud 22 Kevin Plawecki
- Infielders: 2 Juan Uribe 4 Wilmer Flores 5 David Wright 21 Lucas Duda 28 Daniel Murphy 55 Kelly Johnson
- Outfielders: 3 Curtis Granderson 9 Kirk Nieuwenhuis 12 Juan Lagares 23 Michael Cuddyer 30 Michael Conforto 52 Yoenis Céspedes

== Roster ==
2015 New York Mets
Roster
Pitchers: 68 Darío Álvarez; 13 Jerry Blevins; 43 Buddy Carlyle; 46 Tyler Clippard; 40 Bartolo Colón; 48 Jacob deGrom; 27 Jeurys Familia; 35 Dillon Gee; 36 Sean Gilmartin; 62 Erik Goeddel; 33 Matt Harvey; 51 Jack Leathersich; 32 Steven Matz; 58 Jenrry Mejía; 50 Rafael Montero; 64 Akeel Morris; 49 Jon Niese; 44 Eric O'Flaherty; 39 Bobby Parnell; 43 Addison Reed; 47 Hansel Robles; 54 Tim Stauffer; 34 Noah Syndergaard; 54 Alex Torres; 52,72 Carlos Torres; 35 Logan Verrett	Catchers: 7 Travis d'Arnaud; 19 Johnny Monell; 22 Kevin Plawecki; 20 Anthony Recker; Infielders: 29 Eric Campbell; 21 Lucas Duda; 4 Wilmer Flores; 2,16 Dilson Herrera; 55 Kelly Johnson; 16 Daniel Muno; 28 Daniel Murphy; 11 Rubén Tejada; 2 Juan Uribe; 5 David Wright	Outfielders: 1 Darrell Ceciliani; 52 Yoenis Céspedes; 30 Michael Conforto; 23 Michael Cuddyer; 3 Curtis Granderson; 12 Juan Lagares; 44 John Mayberry; 9 Kirk Nieuwenhuis; 1 Eric Young	Manager: 10 Terry Collins; Coaches: 25 Ricky Bones (bullpen); 15 Bob Geren (bench); 26 Tom Goodwin (first base); 78 Eric Langill (bullpen catcher); 57 Kevin Long (hitting); 53 Dave Racaniello (bullpen catcher); 6 Pat Roessler (assistant hitting); 18 Tim Teufel (third base); 59 Dan Warthen (pitching)

== Player stats ==
=== Batting ===
==== Regular season ====
Note: G = Games played; AB = At bats; R = Runs scored; H = Hits; 2B = Doubles; 3B = Triples; HR = Home runs; RBI = Runs batted in; SB = Stolen bases; BB = Base on balls; K = Strikeouts; AVG = Batting average

Player	G	AB	R	H	2B	3B	HR	RBI	SB	BB	K	AVG
Carlos Torres	56	1	1	1	0	0	0	0	0	0	0	1.000
Sean Gilmartin	48	6	1	2	0	0	0	0	0	0	3	.333
David Wright	38	152	24	44	7	0	5	17	2	22	36	.289
Yoenis Cespedes	57	230	39	66	14	4	17	44	4	14	54	.287
Steven Matz	6	14	1	4	1	0	0	5	0	0	1	.286
Daniel Murphy	130	499	56	140	38	2	14	73	2	31	38	.281
Michael Conforto	56	174	30	47	14	0	9	26	0	17	39	.270
Travis d'Arnaud	67	239	31	64	14	1	12	41	0	23	49	.268
Wilmer Flores	137	483	57	122	22	0	16	59	0	19	63	.263
Rubén Tejada	116	360	36	94	23	0	3	28	2	38	70	.259
Curtis Granderson	157	580	98	150	33	2	26	70	11	91	151	.259
Michael Cuddyer	117	379	44	98	18	1	10	41	2	24	88	.259
Juan Lagares	143	441	47	114	16	5	6	41	7	16	87	.259
Kelly Johnson	49	128	18	32	6	0	5	13	1	10	38	.250
Lucas Duda	135	471	67	115	33	0	27	73	0	66	138	.244
Kevin Plawecki	73	233	18	51	9	0	3	21	0	17	60	.219
Juan Uribe	44	128	17	28	9	0	6	20	0	14	34	.219
Dilson Herrera	31	90	7	19	3	1	3	6	2	11	23	.211
Noah Syndergaard	22	43	2	9	1	0	1	4	0	1	26	.209
Kirk Nieuwenhuis	64	107	17	22	9	0	4	13	2	8	40	.208
Darrell Ceciliani	39	68	5	14	2	0	1	3	5	4	25	.208
Eric Campbell	71	173	28	34	8	0	3	19	5	26	37	.197
Jacob deGrom	28	59	3	11	1	0	0	4	0	3	16	.186
Jon Niese	31	52	5	9	1	0	0	4	0	5	18	.173
Johnny Monell	27	48	5	8	2	0	0	4	0	4	13	.167
John Mayberry, Jr.	59	110	8	18	6	1	3	9	1	9	33	.164
Danny Muno	17	27	2	4	1	0	0	0	1	4	11	.148
Bartolo Colón	31	58	2	8	1	0	0	4	0	0	24	.138
Anthony Recker	32	80	6	10	1	0	2	5	1	11	35	.125
Matt Harvey	28	65	1	7	2	0	1	7	0	0	31	.108
Dillon Gee	8	10	0	1	0	0	0	0	0	0	5	.100
Eric Young, Jr.	18	8	9	0	0	0	0	0	3	0	1	.000
Logan Verrett	12	7	0	0	0	0	0	0	0	0	2	.000
Rafael Montero	5	2	0	0	0	0	0	0	0	0	1	.000
Tyler Clippard	29	1	0	0	0	0	0	0	0	0	0	.000
Erik Goeddel	33	1	0	0	0	0	0	0	0	0	0	.000
Alex Torres	37	1	0	0	0	0	0	0	0	0	0	.000
**Team totals**	**162**	**5527**	**683**	**1351**	**295**	**17**	**177**	**654**	**51**	**488**	**1290**	**.244**

==== Postseason ====
Players bolded are presently on Mets active roster.
Note: G = Games played; AB = At bats; R = Runs scored; H = Hits; 2B = Doubles; 3B = Triples; HR = Home runs; RBI = Runs batted in; SB = Stolen bases; BB = Base on balls; K = Strikeouts; AVG = Batting average

Player	G	AB	R	H	2B	3B	HR	RBI	SB	BB	K	AVG
Juan Lagares	7	11	5	5	2	0	0	0	1	1	1	.455
Daniel Murphy	8	33	9	12	1	0	6	9	1	1	6	.364
Curtis Granderson	8	28	3	9	2	0	0	7	3	5	4	.321
Yoenis Cespedes	8	33	5	9	1	0	2	7	1	0	10	.273
Wilmer Flores	7	20	2	5	2	0	0	0	0	2	6	.250
Travis d'Arnaud	8	30	4	6	0	0	2	5	0	0	12	.200
Kelly Johnson	5	5	0	1	0	0	0	0	0	0	3	.200
David Wright	8	27	4	5	2	0	1	3	1	7	11	.185
Michael Cuddyer	4	7	0	1	0	0	0	0	0	1	3	.143
Lucas Duda	8	24	1	3	0	0	0	1	0	2	13	.125
**Michael Conforto**	6	13	1	1	0	0	1	2	0	1	4	.077
**Jacob deGrom**	3	7	0	0	0	0	0	0	0	0	1	.000
Rubén Tejada	2	5	1	0	0	0	0	0	0	1	5	.000
**Noah Syndergaard**	3	4	0	0	0	0	0	0	0	0	2	.000
Matt Harvey	2	4	0	0	0	0	0	0	0	0	2	.000
**Jeurys Familia**	7	1	0	0	0	0	0	0	0	0	1	.000
**Steven Matz**	1	1	0	0	0	0	0	0	0	0	0	.000

=== Pitching ===
Players bolded are currently on the Mets active roster.
Note: G = Games pitched; GS = Games started; W = Wins; L = Losses; SV = Saves; IP = Innings pitched; H = Hits allowed; R = Runs allowed; ER = Earned runs allowed; BB = Walks allowed; K = Strikeouts; ERA = Earned run average;

Player	G	GS	W	L	SV	IP	H	R	ER	BB	K	ERA
Jenrry Mejía	7	0	1	0	0	7.1	4	0	0	2	7	0.00
Jerry Blevins	7	0	1	0	0	5.0	0	0	0	0	4	0.00
Addison Reed	17	0	1	1	1	15.1	11	2	2	5	17	1.17
**Jeurys Familia**	76	0	2	2	43	78	59	16	16	19	86	1.85
**Steven Matz**	6	6	4	0	0	35.2	34	9	9	10	34	2.27
Jack Leathersich	17	0	0	0	0	11.2	12	3	3	0	1	2.31
Erik Goeddel	35	0	1	1	0	33.1	24	9	9	9	34	2.43
**Jacob deGrom**	30	30	14	8	0	191.0	149	59	54	38	205	2.54
Sean Gilmartin	50	1	3	2	0	57.1	50	17	17	18	54	2.67
Matt Harvey	29	29	13	8	0	189.1	156	62	57	37	188	2.71
Logan Verrett	14	4	1	1	1	38.2	23	13	13	11	36	3.03
Tyler Clippard	32	0	4	1	2	32.1	24	13	11	10	26	3.06
Alex Torres	39	0	0	0	1	39.0	26	16	12	26	35	3.15
**Noah Syndergaard**	24	24	9	7	0	150.0	126	60	54	31	166	3.24
Hansel Robles	57	0	4	3	0	54.0	37	27	22	18	61	3.67
Jon Niese	33	29	9	10	0	176.2	192	93	81	55	113	4.13
Bartolo Colón	33	31	14	13	0	194.2	217	94	90	24	136	4.16
Rafael Montero	5	1	0	1	0	10.0	9	6	5	5	13	4.50
Carlos Torres	59	0	5	6	0	57.2	61	32	30	18	48	4.68
Buddy Carlyle	11	0	1	0	1	8.0	8	5	5	0	6	5.63
Dillon Gee	8	7	0	3	0	39.2	55	29	26	11	25	5.90
Bobby Parnell	30	0	2	4	1	24.0	30	20	17	17	13	6.38
Tim Stauffer	5	0	0	0	0	5.2	8	5	5	2	8	7.94
Darío Álvarez	6	0	1	0	0	3.2	5	5	5	1	2	12.27
Eric O'Flaherty	16	0	0	0	0	8.2	18	13	13	5	6	13.50
Akeel Morris	1	0	0	0	0	0.2	3	5	5	3	0	67.50
**Team totals**	**162**	**162**	**90**	**72**	**50**	**1462.2**	**1341**	**613**	**557**	**383**	**1337**	**3.43**

== Farm system ==
Level	Team	League	Manager
AAA	Las Vegas 51s	Pacific Coast League	Wally Backman
AA	Binghamton Rumble Ponies	Eastern League	Pedro López
A-Advanced	St. Lucie Mets	Florida State League	Luis Rojas
A	Savannah Sand Gnats	South Atlantic League	José Leger
A-Short Season	Brooklyn Cyclones	New York–Penn League	Tom Gamboa
Rookie	Kingsport Mets	Appalachian League	Luis Rivera
Rookie	GCL Mets	Gulf Coast League	José Carreño
Rookie	DSL Mets 1 & 2	Dominican Summer League	Manny Martínez; David Davalillo
