= Eric Campbell (baseball) =

American baseball player (born 1987)

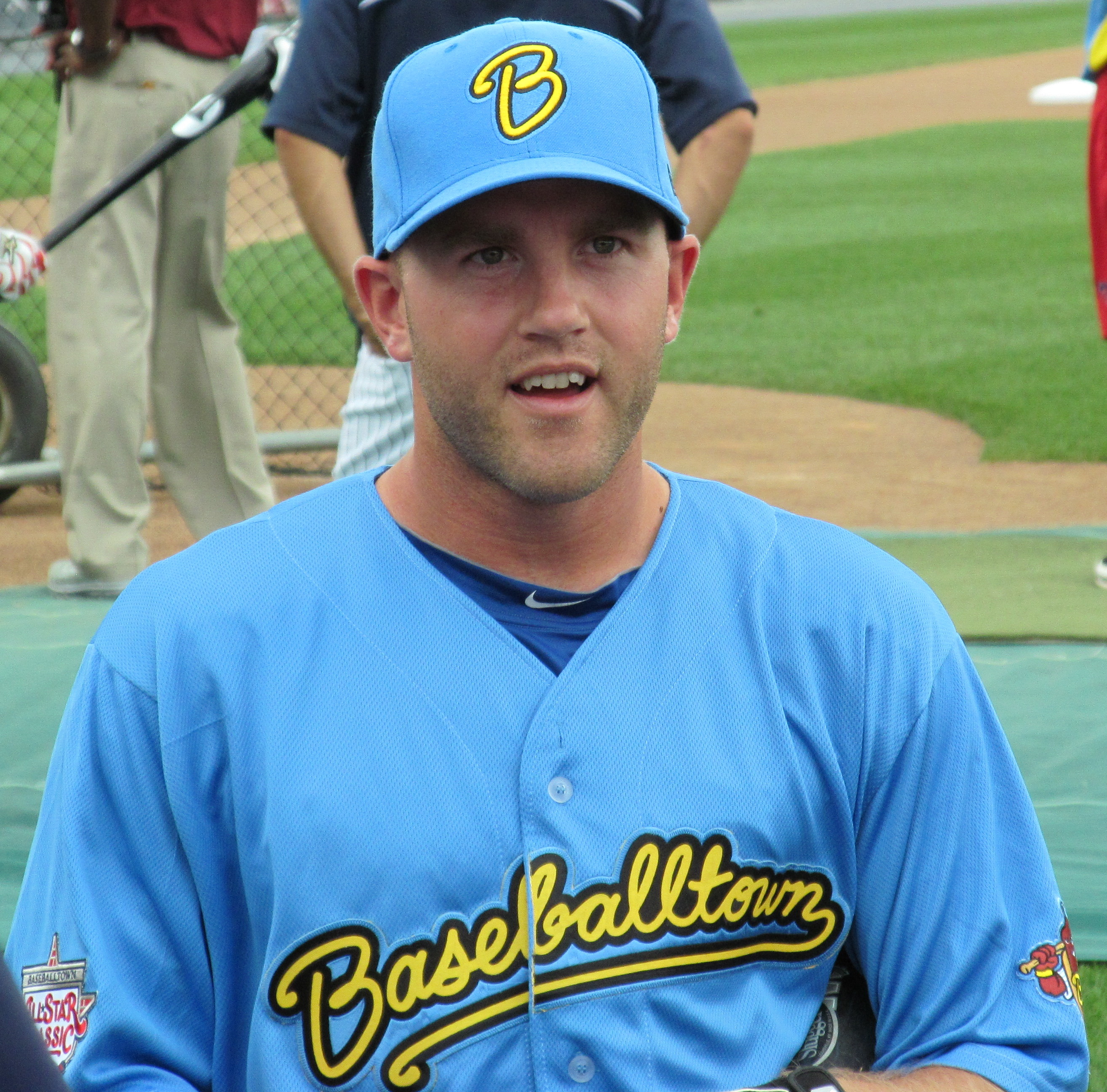
- Campbell with the Binghamton Mets
- Third baseman / First baseman
- Born: April 9, 1987 (age 39); Norwich, Connecticut, U.S.
- Batted: Right Threw: Right

Professional debut
- MLB: May 10, 2014, for the New York Mets
- NPB: April 25, 2017, for the Hanshin Tigers

Last appearance
- MLB: May 29, 2021, for the Seattle Mariners
- NPB: June 6, 2017, for the Hanshin Tigers

MLB statistics
- Batting average: .223
- Home runs: 7
- Runs batted in: 44

NPB statistics
- Batting average: .191
- Home runs: 1
- Runs batted in: 5
- Stats at Baseball Reference

Teams
- New York Mets (2014–2016); Hanshin Tigers (2017); Seattle Mariners (2021)

Eric Singleton Campbell (born April 9, 1987), nicknamed "Soup", is an American former professional baseball utility player. He played in Major League Baseball (MLB) for the New York Mets and Seattle Mariners and in Nippon Professional Baseball (NPB) for the Hanshin Tigers.

== Early life ==
Campbell was born on April 9, 1987, in Norwich, Connecticut, the younger of two children to Hugh Baird "Duke" Campbell and Amy B. Campbell (née Burgess). His father was a school principal at the Norwich Free Academy as well as a baseball and basketball coach, while his mother, a 1977 NFA graduate, served as assistant principal and principal at Hebron Elementary School until her 2015 retirement after previously having spent 27 years working in Preston School District at Preston Veterans School in a variety of roles, including as a onetime principal-designee.

== Baseball career ==
=== High school ===
Campbell attended the Norwich Free Academy and played on the school's varsity baseball team beginning in his freshman year. Campbell played first base his freshman year, then moved to third in tenth grade and to shortstop as a junior, setting himself up for the versatility he would become known for on a professional level. Campbell was part of the 2003 team that won the Connecticut state high school championship. While in high school, Campbell was named to Baseball America's preseason All-America and All-Northeast first teams; he also received All-Conference and New Haven Register All-State accolades. Described by coach John Iovino as a "complete, and I mean complete" player, as a senior, Campbell served as team captain and set Norwich Free Academy career records for hits, home runs, batting average, stolen bases, runs, walks and at bats, hitting nearly .500 on the season in the leadoff spot. Even as a Major Leaguer, Campbell reflected fondly upon his teenage years, saying: "My favorite memories of playing baseball is playing for NFA, because you are playing with all of your best friends and having fun. That's what this game is about." He was a high school teammate of Andrew Carignan.

=== College ===
After being spotted by then-coach Peter Hughes, Campbell was offered a scholarship to play college baseball for Boston College, where he was teammates with Pete Frates, who would later originate the ALS Ice Bucket Challenge. As a freshman with the Eagles, Campbell hit .260, batting sixth and starting at third base. He improved his batting average to .350 with 20 doubles and 41 RBI in 52 games as a sophomore. As a junior, he hit .306 with 18 doubles, 43 runs and 41 RBI in 53 games. At Boston College, Campbell gained the appellation "Soup" from his teammates, a name which he would later carry into his professional career. Campbell was described by Eagles coach Mik Aoki as a "good, sarcastic Northeasterner" with a dry sense of humor, a good teammate and a humble player who could easily blend into any clubhouse environment.

=== New York Mets ===
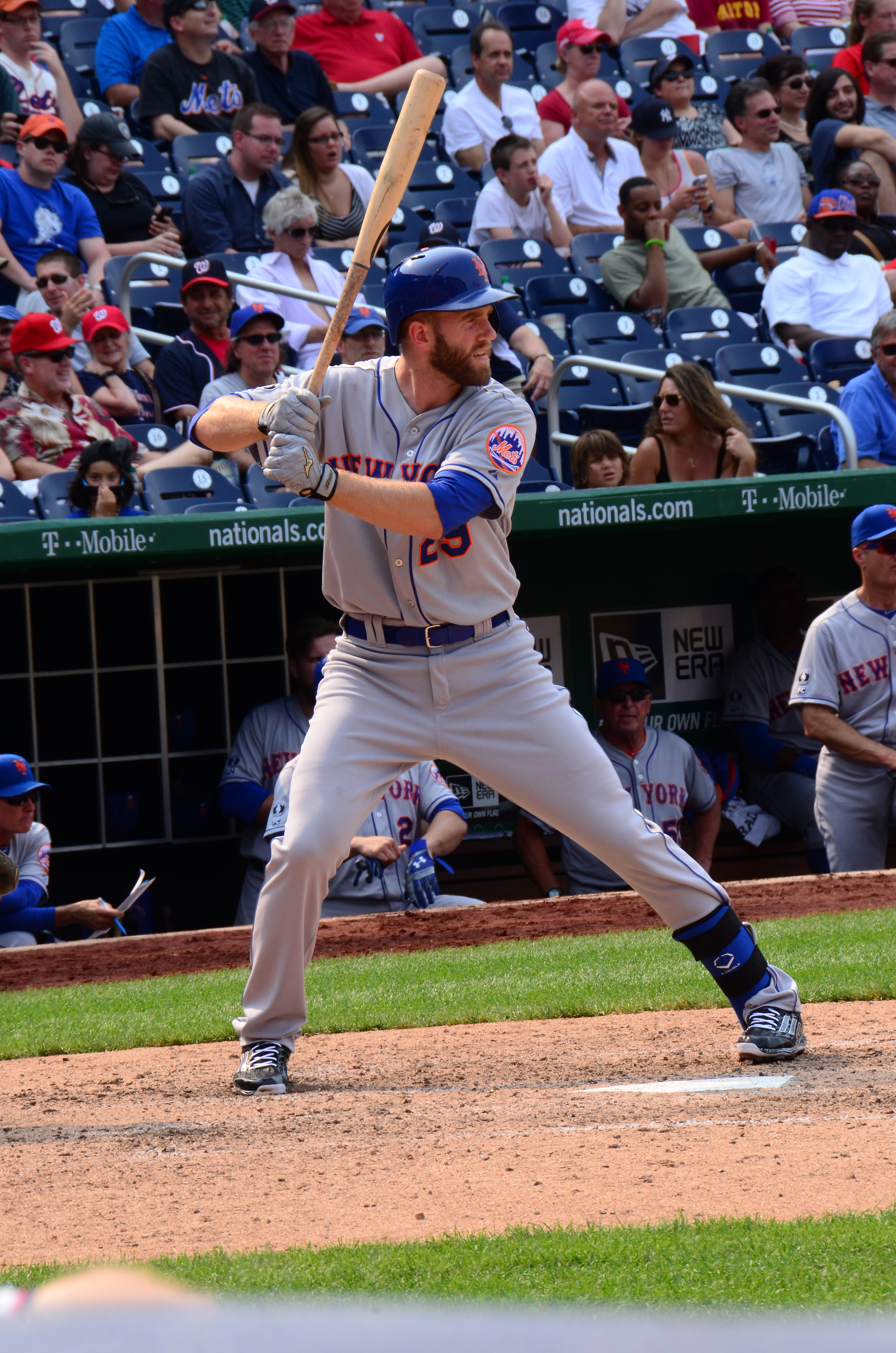
Campbell with the Mets in 2014

Campbell was drafted by the New York Mets in the 8th round of the 2008 MLB Amateur Draft, although he attempted to avoid following too closely the media coverage of the event, opting instead to go golfing with his father Hugh. Campbell, who had suspected that he would be chosen before the 15th round, only found out of his being picked by the Mets when he happened to check his computer before leaving for the links.

Campbell began his professional career in low-A with the Brooklyn Cyclones in 2008, hitting .260 and fielding .949 at third base, his main position. He split 2009 between the Savannah Sand Gnats, where he hit .248, and St. Lucie Mets, with whom he had 6 hits in 22 at-bats. In 2010, he played for the GCL Mets (going 3-for-11 at the plate), St. Lucie (with whom he hit .335 in 46 games) and the Binghamton Mets (with whom he hit .279 in 50 games). With Binghamton in 2011, he batted .247. With Binghamton again in 2012, he hit .297, earning a spot on the Eastern League Mid-Season All-Star team. He reached Triple-A for the first time in 2013, hitting .314 with 25 doubles, eight home runs and 66 RBI in 120 games for the Las Vegas 51s. Regard his big-league aspirations, Campbell told the Norwich Bulletin in 2013: "You think about it [a promotion] constantly, but you also understand that it's out of your control and the only thing you can do is go out and play hard. I've said it before: Nobody plays baseball to play in Triple-A. Everybody wants to play in the big leagues." Campbell was described by his coaches as a cerebral and quiet player who took a while to gain his swing in the minors. After feeling that he had not received enough playing time on the Cyclones, Campbell approached Edgardo Alfonzo, his manager, and volunteered to play the outfield, ushering in a new era of versatility for his professional career. Wally Backman, Campbell's onetime manager in Las Vegas, agreed, saying that Campbell "didn't care where he played, he just wanted to play." As a minor leaguer, Campbell developed a solid work ethic which enabled him to be versatile and yet skilled; he would eat peanut butter sandwiches and drink protein shakes before arriving at the ballpark early each day to practice fielding both on the infield and outfield and to take practice swings in the batting cage. Campbell also honed his hitting technique in the minors, where he learned to quiet his swings, pay attention to his hand position and study opposing pitchers. In one game in 2013, Campbell came in to pitch for the 51s, giving up 4 runs on a walk and 4 hits (including a home run) in one inning, which he ended by striking out Nolan Arenado.

==== 2014 ====
Campbell was promoted to the Mets from Las Vegas on May 10, 2014, in what his father Hugh described as a "glorious weekend". He made his debut batting against the Philadelphia Phillies in the bottom of the sixth inning pinch-hitting for Lucas Duda with the bases loaded, hitting a sac-fly to right fielder Marlon Byrd on a 1–0 count driving in Daniel Murphy for his first major league RBI off pitcher Jake Diekman. On May 11, Campbell got his first major league hit, a single in the bottom of the fourth inning off pitcher Cole Hamels. On May 21, he hit his first major league homerun, a two-run home run off Los Angeles Dodgers' pitcher Hyun-jin Ryu.

On July 7, during a game between the Atlanta Braves and New York Mets at Citi Field, in the bottom of the 9th inning and the game tied at three, Juan Lagares bunted towards third base to advance base runner Eric Campbell to second base. Braves third baseman Chris Johnson fielded the ball and threw to shortstop Andrelton Simmons, who was covering second base. Simmons was in no danger of being hit by the runner, yet the umpires ruled the runner out, calling it was a neighborhood play. Mets manager Terry Collins argued that it could not have been a neighborhood play, since it was a bunt play and recording a double play would be almost impossible. Simmons was moving away from 2nd base, and didn't record an out at 1st, either. Therefore, Collins claimed the only reason Simmons had to come off the base was an errant throw. The umpires accepted the claim and reviewed the play, and after review the out call was overturned. This led to an argument and ejection of Braves manager Fredi González, who later said about the call that it was one of the worst calls he'd seen in his life. The Mets would go on to win the game 4–3 in 11 innings.

Campbell finished the 2014 season appearing in 85 games with a batting average of .263 in 190 at-bats. He had 50 hits, 16 RBIs, 3 home runs, 17 walks and 16 runs scored, while striking out 55 times.

==== 2015 ====
Before the 2015 season, Campbell learned how to catch; although he had never previously caught professionally, he said that "if another position needs to be added, I'm all for it." Campbell began the 2015 season with the 51s. On April 15, Campbell was called up to the Mets after David Wright was placed on the disabled list with a strained right hamstring. On May 5, he was demoted to make room for catcher Johnny Monell on the roster. He was recalled to the Mets replacing Dilson Herrera who was placed on the DL due to a fractured tip of his middle finger on May 15. On August 10, he was sent back to the 51s to make room for Michael Cuddyer coming off the 15-day disabled list. He was recalled on September 1 due to expanded rosters.

Campbell finished the 2015 season appearing in 71 games with a batting average of .197 in 173 at-bats. He had 34 hits, 19 RBIs, 3 home runs, 26 walks and 28 runs scored, while striking out 37 times. The Wall Street Journal dubbed Campbell "baseball's unluckiest hitter" in 2015 based on statistics compiled by Inside Edge which showed that his rate of "well-hit" balls was much higher than his actual batting average.

==== 2016 ====
Campbell made the Mets' roster for Opening Day in 2016. On April 12, Campbell was demoted after making three appearances primarily as a Pinch runner and Pinch hitter to make room for Rafael Montero. Campbell was promoted again when Jacob deGrom was placed on the Family Emergency List three days later. On May 3, Campbell teamed up with Mets outfielder Curtis Granderson to read books (such as Green Eggs and Ham and If You Give a Pig a Pancake) to children at Corona, Queens' P.S. 92, following in the footsteps of former readers Wilmer Flores, Daniel Murphy, Bobby Parnell, Sean Gilmartin, Josh Edgin and Kirk Nieuwenhuis. On May 31, Campbell was demoted back to the 51s to make room for newly acquired first baseman James Loney. Campbell was batting .159 with one home run and five RBIs in 30 games. After the conclusion of the Triple-A season, Campbell was called back up to the Major Leagues. He was outrighted off the 40-man roster on November 2, 2016, assigned to the Triple-A Las Vegas 51s; after his outrighting, Campbell declared free agency.

=== Hanshin Tigers ===
On December 3, 2016, Campbell signed with the Hanshin Tigers of Nippon Professional Baseball's Central League. Campbell described his decision to go play in Japan one motivated by a need for a "change of scenery"; he also commented that his game had become rusty after a few years of irregular playing time in the Mets organization.

==== 2017 ====
Campbell began spring training with the rest of the Tigers on February 1, 2017, but was soon sidelined by an injured wrist in an intrasquad game. Diagnosed with an inflamed left wrist, Campbell began his first season in Japan hurt. He hit .191/.296/.298 with 1 home run and 5 RBI with Hanshin before being released on January 25, 2018.

=== Miami Marlins ===
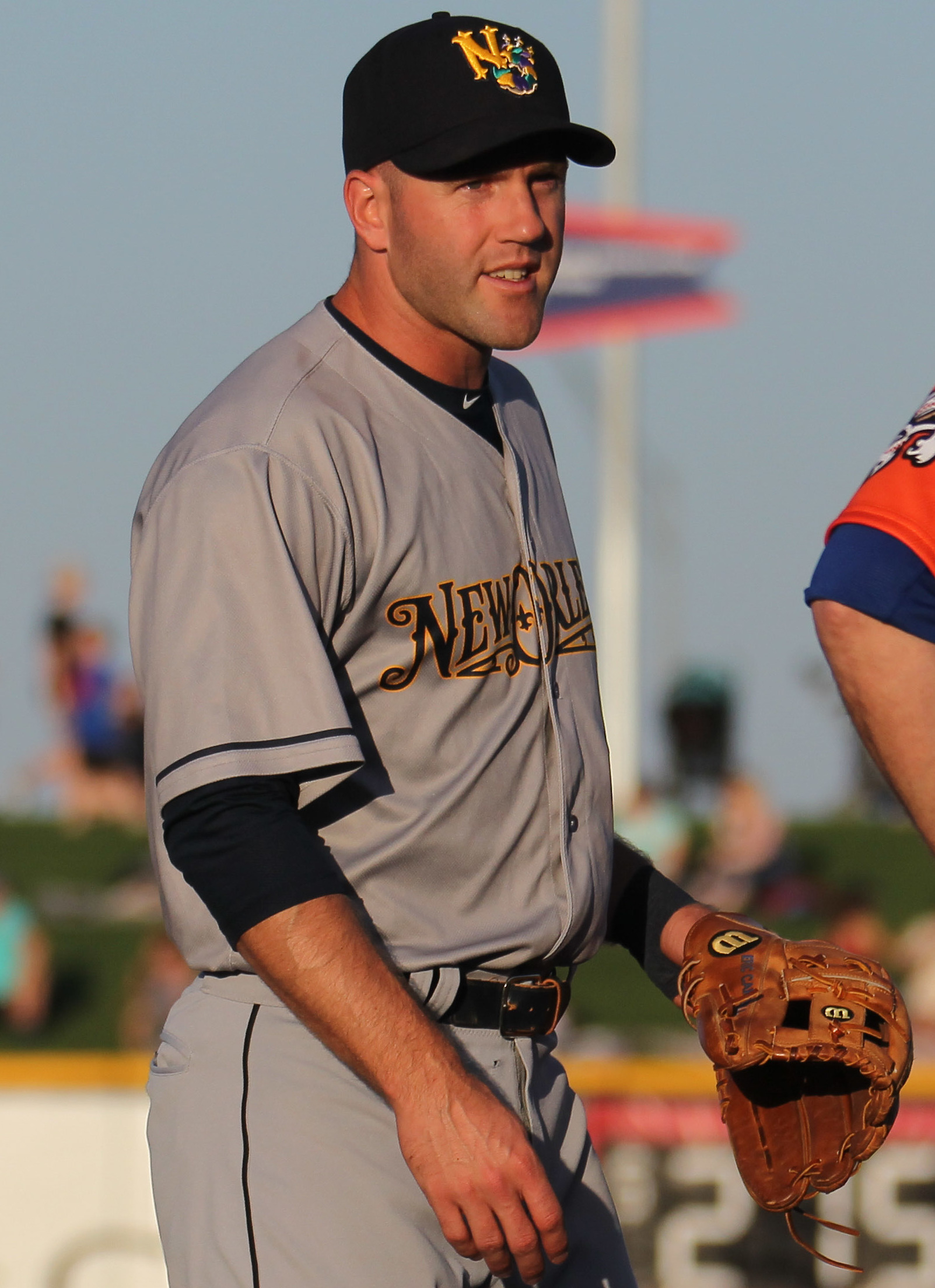
Campbell with the New Orleans Baby Cakes in 2018

On February 17, 2018, Campbell signed a minor league contract with the Miami Marlins and was invited to participate in spring training. He was named a Pacific Coast League All-Star. He finished the season second in the league in on-base percentage. In 95 games for the Triple–A New Orleans Baby Cakes, Campbell hit .313/.420/.445 with 6 home runs and 68 RBI. He elected free agency following the season on November 2.

=== Oakland Athletics ===
On January 24, 2019, Campbell signed a minor league contract with the Oakland Athletics. Campbell re-signed with Oakland on November 25, 2019. Campbell was invited to spring training with Oakland in 2020. He was added to the team's 60-man player pool in July. He became a free agent on November 2, 2020.

=== Seattle Mariners ===
On May 12, 2021, Campbell signed a minor league contract with the Seattle Mariners organization. On May 21, Campbell was selected to the active roster. In the game, Campbell made his first MLB appearance since 2016, notching a single against San Diego Padres starter Chris Paddack in his only at-bat. Campbell went 3–for–11 in 4 games for Seattle before being outrighted off of the 40-man roster on June 2. Campbell retired from professional baseball on July 28.

== Coaching career ==
On April 29, 2021, Campbell, a native of Norwich, Connecticut, was hired to be the manager of the Norwich Sea Unicorns of the Futures Collegiate Baseball League for their 2021 season. However he stepped down before ever coaching a game when he was offered a minor league deal by the Seattle Mariners and soon returned to the major leagues.

== Personal life ==
As of 2022, Campbell, owns and operates Lumber2Leather, a training facility for Baseball and Softball athletes.

Campbell married his childhood sweetheart, Kristin Hammond.
