= Darrell Ceciliani =

American baseball player (born 1990)

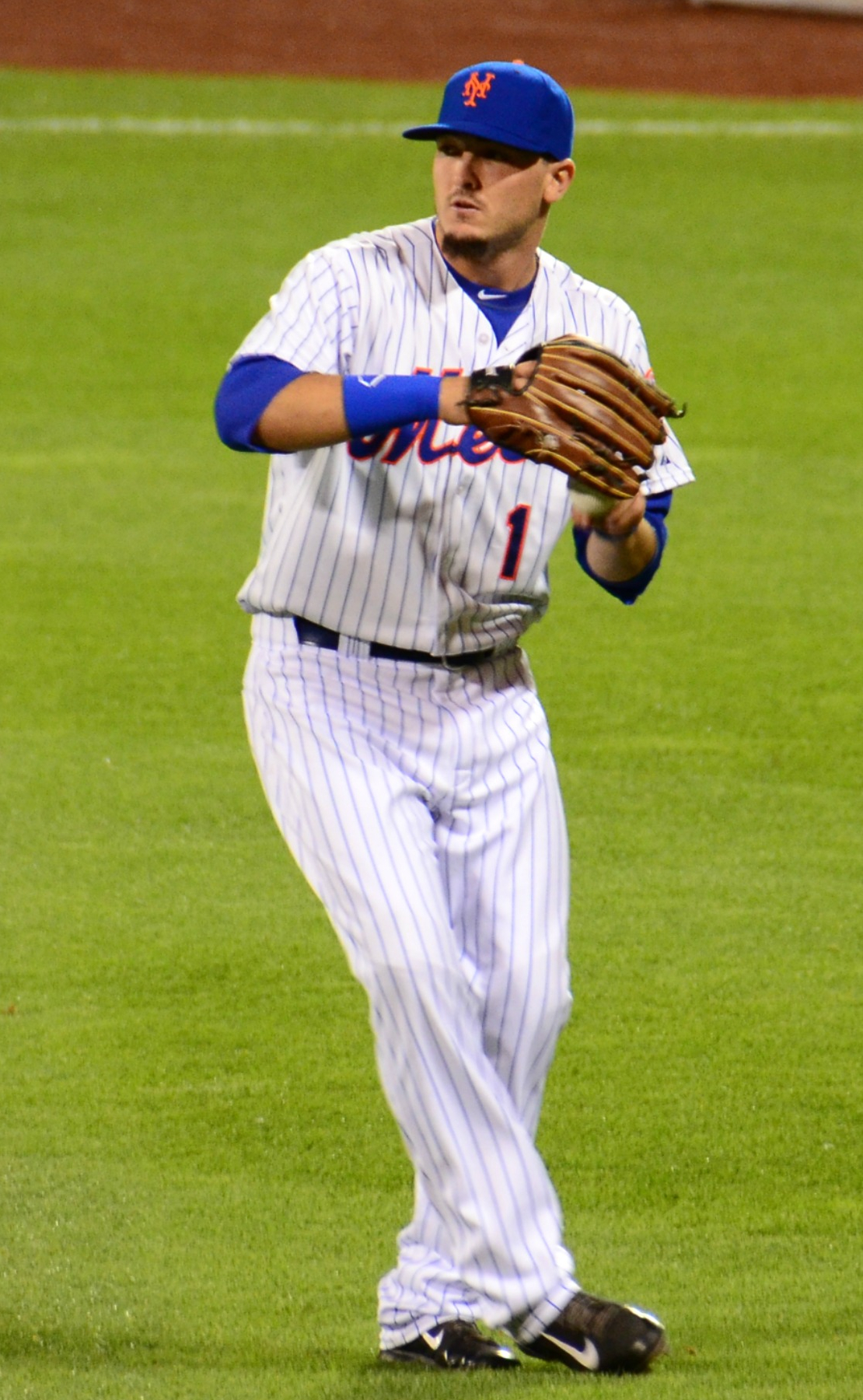
- Ceciliani with the New York Mets in 2015
- Left fielder
- Born: June 22, 1990 (age 35); Tracy, California, U.S.
- Batted: Left Threw: Left

MLB debut
- May 19, 2015, for the New York Mets

Last MLB appearance
- May 18, 2017, for the Toronto Blue Jays

MLB statistics
- Batting average: .190
- Hits: 19
- Home runs: 2
- Runs batted in: 7
- Stats at Baseball Reference

Teams
- New York Mets (2015); Toronto Blue Jays (2016–2017)

Darrell Albert Ceciliani, Jr. (born June 22, 1990) is an American former professional baseball left fielder. He played in Major League Baseball (MLB) for the New York Mets and Toronto Blue Jays.

== Early life ==
Ceciliani was born in Tracy, California, though he moved to Madras, Oregon when he was young. Prior to playing professionally, he attended Madras High School and then Columbia Basin College. In his only year at Columbia Basin, he led the team in slugging percentage, doubles, triples, home runs, RBIs, walks and runs scored.

== Professional career ==
=== New York Mets ===
==== Minor leagues ====
Ceciliani was drafted by the New York Mets in the fourth round of the 2009 Major League Baseball draft. He was the highest picked player from Oregon and second-highest drafted player in the Northwest in that year's draft.

In his first professional season, Ceciliani hit .234 with 2 home runs and 13 RBI in 42 games for the Rookie-level Kingsport Mets, and stole 14 bases in 16 tries. The next year, he hit .351 with a .410 on-base percentage, a .531 slugging percentage, 12 triples, 21 stolen bases and 56 runs scored in 68 games for the Short Season-A Brooklyn Cyclones. He led the New York–Penn League in batting average, runs and hits (95). His batting average, hit total, run total and triples set team records. It was even thought that he could challenge Jack Maloof's league record .402 batting average, set in 1971. He was named a MiLB.com Organization All-Star and a Mid-Season All-Star that year, and Baseball America ranked him the 11th-best prospect in the New York-Penn League and the 14th best prospect in the Mets system.

Ceciliani hit .259 with 23 doubles and 25 stolen bases in 33 tries in 109 games for the Class-A Savannah Sand Gnats in 2011. Baseball America ranked him New York's 19th-best prospect. In 2012, he hit .329 with a .402 on-base percentage and 28 hits in 23 games for the Advanced-A St. Lucie Mets while battling a hamstring injury. He played for the Surprise Saguaros of the Arizona Fall League that season, hitting .258 in 18 games. In 2013, Ceciliani played 113 games for the Double-A Binghamton Mets, batting .268 with 6 home runs and 44 RBI. He also played for Binghamton in 2014, hitting .289 in 106 games and adding 7 home runs and 54 RBI.

==== Major leagues ====
Ceciliani had been invited to spring training with the Mets each year since 2010. He was called up to the Major Leagues for the first time on May 19, 2015, replacing Kirk Nieuwenhuis, who was designated for assignment. He made his debut the same day, appearing in the 7th inning as a pinch hitter getting his first major league hit, an infield single off St. Louis Cardinals pitcher Michael Wacha at Citi Field.

On June 1, Ceciliani notched his first RBI with a single scoring Michael Cuddyer off pitcher Andrew Cashner in the 5th inning in a 7–0 win against the San Diego Padres at Petco Park. He hit his first Major League home run on June 14, off Mike Foltynewicz of the Atlanta Braves in a 10–8 comeback win. At this point since arriving to the Mets, Ceciliani had batted .290 with a .341 on-base percentage, one home run and three RBI, while playing left and center field. On July 6, Ceciliani was optioned to the Triple-A Las Vegas 51s, with Kirk Nieuwenhuis promoted to replace him. On September 8, Ceciliani was promoted to the major league roster and put on the 60-day disabled list to make room for Tim Stauffer on the 40-man roster. He appeared in 39 games for the Mets in 2015, batting .206 with 1 home run and 3 RBI. In Triple-A, Ceciliani batted .345 with 9 home runs and 36 RBI in 70 games played.

He was designated for assignment on January 27, 2016, to make room for Yoenis Céspedes on the 40-man roster.

=== Toronto Blue Jays ===
On February 2, 2016, Ceciliani was traded to the Toronto Blue Jays for either a player to be named later, or cash considerations. He was optioned to the Triple-A Buffalo Bisons on March 30. He was recalled by the Blue Jays on June 17 when José Bautista went on the disabled list. On August 8, Ceciliani was recalled after Kevin Pillar was placed on the disabled list. He was optioned back to Buffalo on August 19, and recalled on September 2 after the Major League roster expansion. Ceciliani appeared in 13 games for the Blue Jays in 2016, hitting .111 with one RBI.

Ceciliani opened the 2017 season with the Bisons, and was recalled on May 16. In a game against the Atlanta Braves on May 18, Ceciliani hit his first home run as a Blue Jay, but partially dislocated his shoulder while doing so. He was removed from the game afterward and placed on the disabled list the following day. On November 1, 2017, Ceciliani was outrighted to Triple-A Buffalo. He elected free agency on November 7.

=== New Britain Bees ===
On April 3, 2018, Ceciliani signed with the New Britain Bees of the Atlantic League of Professional Baseball. In 21 games for the Bees, he hit .212/.268/.258 with no home runs and two RBI. Ceciliani became a free agent following the 2018 season.

== Family ==
Ceciliani's brother, Devin, was drafted in the 34th round of the 2013 Major League Baseball draft by the Tampa Bay Rays, but did not sign.
