= Danny Muno =

American baseball player (born 1989)

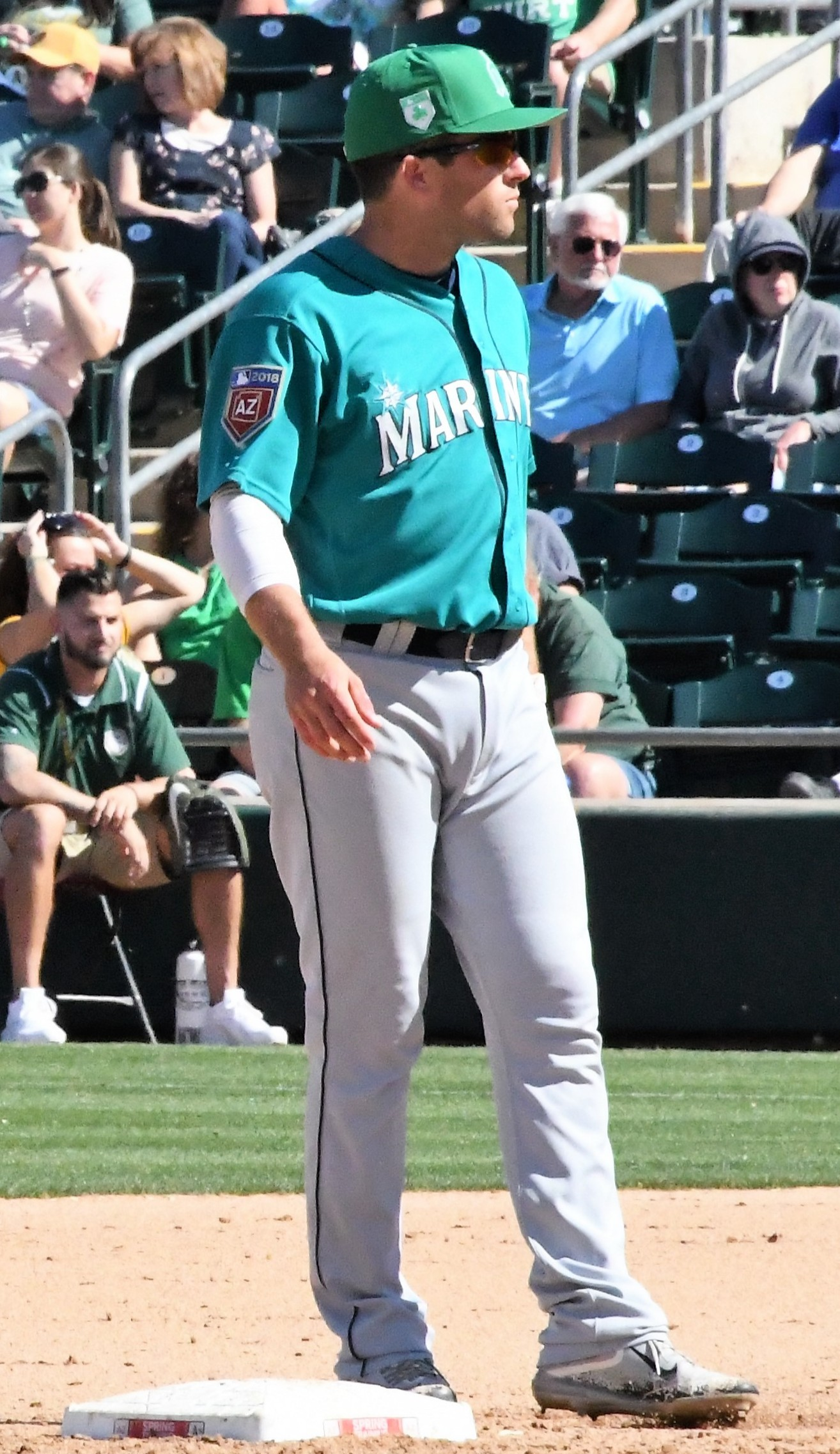
- Muno with the Seattle Mariners in 2018 Spring Training
- Infielder
- Born: February 9, 1989 (age 37); Long Beach, California, U.S.
- Batted: Switch Threw: Right

MLB debut
- April 17, 2015, for the New York Mets

Last MLB appearance
- July 24, 2015, for the New York Mets

MLB statistics
- Batting average: .148
- Home runs: 0
- Runs batted in: 0
- Stats at Baseball Reference

Teams
- New York Mets (2015)

Daniel Joseph Muno (born February 9, 1989) is an American former professional baseball infielder. He played in Major League Baseball (MLB) for the New York Mets in 2015.

== Amateur career ==
Prior to playing professionally, he attended Loyola High School and then California State University, Fresno. As a freshman with Fresno State, he hit .332 with 62 runs in 77 games, was named Freshman of the Year and helped lead Fresno State to victory in the 2008 College World Series. He batted .379 with 25 doubles and 74 runs in 62 games as a sophomore. He was named All-Western Athletic Conference at second base.

In his junior year, he hit .329 with 68 runs in 63 games and became the career Fresno State walk leader, with 167. He was drafted by the Chicago Cubs in the 26th round of the 2010 Major League Baseball draft, but did not sign a contract, opting to remain in college for his senior year. He hit .348 with 47 runs, 52 RBI and 46 walks in 56 games as a senior.

In 2009, he played collegiate summer baseball in the Cape Cod Baseball League for the Orleans Firebirds, and returned to the league in 2010 to play for both the Firebirds and the Yarmouth-Dennis Red Sox.

After being taken by New York in the 8th round of the 2011 Major League Baseball draft, he signed a contract. The signing scout was Doug Thurman.

== Professional career ==
=== New York Mets ===
==== Minor league ====
Muno hit .355 with 23 doubles, 45 runs scored, 43 walks (to only 39 strikeouts) and 9 stolen bases in 59 games for the Brooklyn Cyclones in his first professional season, 2011. He led the New York–Penn League in batting average, on-base percentage and OPS. Baseball America named him the 18th-best prospect in the New York–Penn League, the 30th-best prospect in the Mets system and the player with the best strike zone discipline in the Mets organization following the season. He was also a New York–Penn League Mid-Season All-Star and an MiLB.com Organization All-Star.

With the St. Lucie Mets in 2012 Muno hit .280 with 19 stolen bases in 22 tries, 50 walks and 6 home runs in 81 games. He was suspended 50 games for testing positive for performance-enhancing drugs. Baseball America again said he had the best strike zone discipline in the Mets system. He hit .249 with 86 runs, 27 doubles, 15 stolen bases in 26 tries and 92 walks for the Binghamton Mets in 2013. He began 2014 with the Las Vegas 51s.

==== Major leagues ====
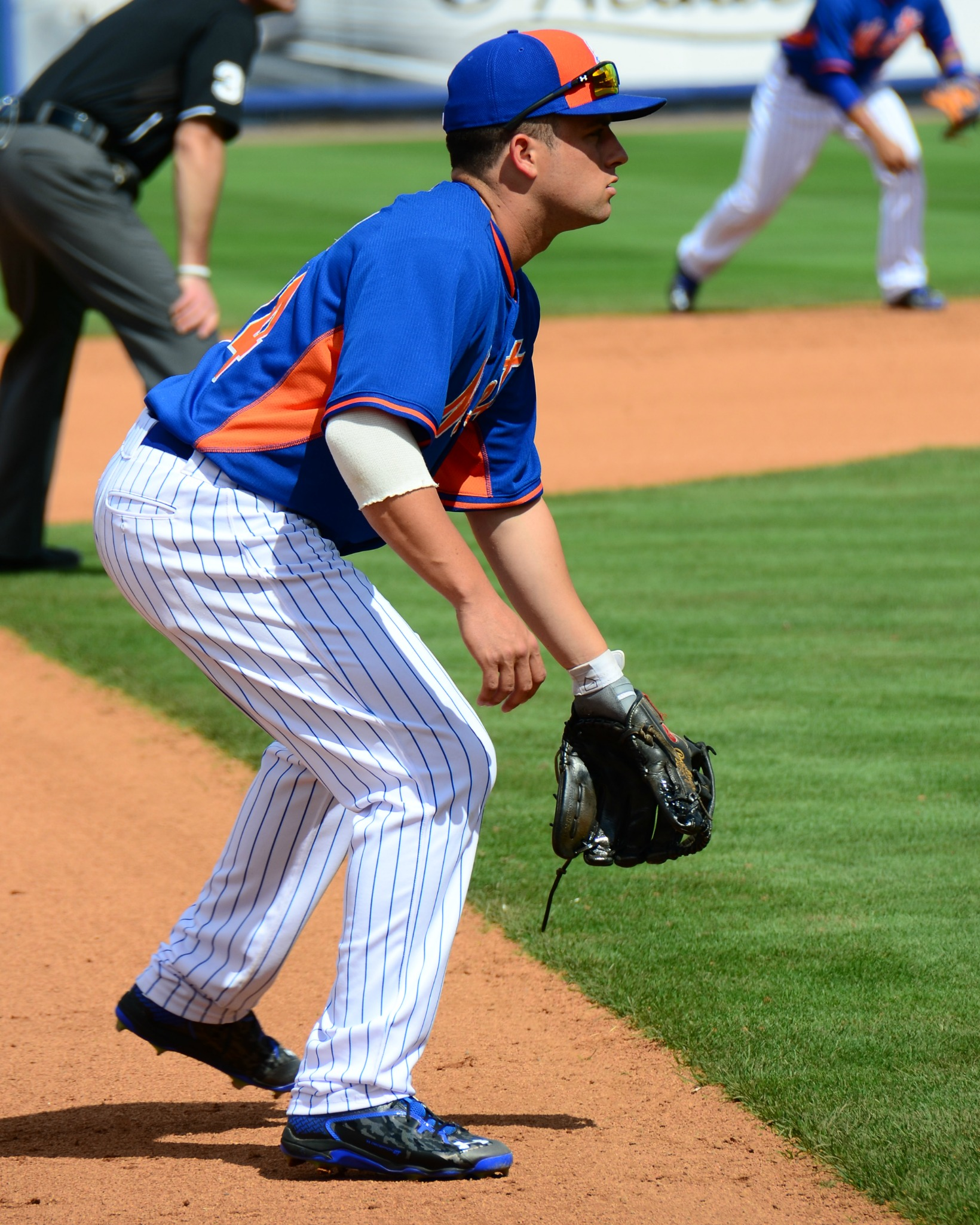
Muno during his tenure with the New York Mets in 2015 Spring Training

Muno made his major-league debut on April 17, 2015 as a pinch-hitter, recording a single off Marlins' reliever Sam Dyson for his first major league hit. He then stole second base. In 2015 Muno tied a Mets record with three errors in one game. He was outrighted off the Mets roster on August 31, 2015. He began 2016 with the Las Vegas 51s before being released on June 28.

=== Chicago White Sox ===
On July 1, 2016, Muno signed a minor league contract with the White Sox. After batting .211 in 33 games for the Charlotte Knights, he was released on August 17.

=== Miami Marlins ===
On August 20, 2016, Muno signed a minor league contract with the Miami Marlins. In 8 games for the Double–A Jacksonville Suns, he batted .222/.364/.222 with no home runs or RBI. Muno elected free agency following the season on November 7.

=== Southern Maryland Blue Crabs ===
On February 20, 2017, Muno signed a minor league contract with the Detroit Tigers. He was released prior to the start of the season on March 25.

On April 6, 2017, Muno signed with the Southern Maryland Blue Crabs of the Atlantic League of Professional Baseball. In 18 games he hit .254/.429/.390 with one home run, four RBI, and four stolen bases.

=== Seattle Mariners ===
On May 11, 2017, Muno had his contract purchased by the Seattle Mariners.

Muno re–signed with the Mariners organization on a minor league contract on October 30, 2017. He played in 62 games for the Triple–A Tacoma Rainiers, hitting .195/.321/.265 with one home run and 23 RBI. Muno elected free agency following the season on November 2, 2018.

Muno joined the Tacoma Rainiers front office as a sales manager following the 2018 season.
