= Denver Christian School =

Christian school in Colorado, US

Coordinates: 39.677730°N 104.981060°W

Location
- 3898 South Teller Street; Lakewood, Colorado United States 80235; United States

Information
- Religious affiliation: Christian
- Established: 1916
- Status: Open
- CEEB code: 060395
- Head of school: Michael Ehrenfried
- Grades: PK-12
- Enrollment: 1005
- Average class size: 18
- Campus type: Preschool-12th grade
- Colours: Royal Blue and White
- Athletics: CHSAA 2A
- Athletics conference: Metro League
- Mascot: Thunder
- Accreditation: Christian Schools International, Cognia, Association of Christian Schools International
- Yearbook: yes
- Website: https://www.denverchristian.org/

Denver Christian School is a private college preparatory Christian school that serves preschool through 12th graders in Lakewood, Colorado. It was founded in 1916.

Its mission is to inspire and equip children of Christian parents to engage the world with Christ’s transforming power and love.

Its vision is to provide an accessible, world-class, whole child, Christian education, that continually helps its students flourish every day in every way

== State championships ==
State Championships
Season	Sport	Number of Championships	Year
Fall	Football	1	2003
Fall	Soccer, Boys	2	1997,2007
Fall	Cross Country, Boys	2	1999, 2000
Fall	Cross Country, Girls	2	2000, 2001
Fall	Volleyball	1	2019
Fall	Golf, Boys	0	
Fall	Basketball, Boys	9	1970,1978,1980,1982,1983,2005,2006,2012,2013
Fall	Baseball	4	1996, 2013, 2023, 2024
Fall	Soccer, Girls	4	1992,2001,2004, 2017
Fall	Cheer, Girls	6	2001,2021, 2022, 2023,2024, 2025

== Notable alumni ==
- Kirk Nieuwenhuis, Current MLB player (Milwaukee Brewers)
