= Logan Verrett =

American baseball player (born 1990)

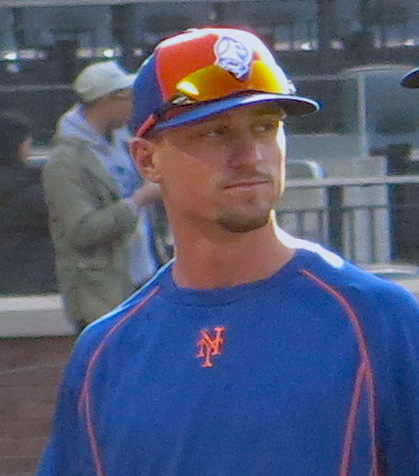
- Verrett with the Mets in 2016
- Pitcher
- Born: June 19, 1990 (age 36); The Woodlands, Texas, U.S.
- Batted: Right Threw: Right

Professional debut
- MLB: April 8, 2015, for the Texas Rangers
- KBO: March 25, 2018, for the NC Dinos

Last appearance
- MLB: June 11, 2017, for the Baltimore Orioles
- KBO: October 13, 2018, for the NC Dinos

MLB statistics
- Win–loss record: 6–10
- Earned run average: 4.62
- Strikeouts: 114

KBO statistics
- Win–loss record: 6–10
- Earned run average: 5.28
- Strikeouts: 144
- Stats at Baseball Reference

Teams
- Texas Rangers (2015); New York Mets (2015–2016); Baltimore Orioles (2017); NC Dinos (2018)

Scott Logan Verrett (born June 19, 1990) is an American former professional baseball pitcher. He played in Major League Baseball (MLB) for the Texas Rangers, New York Mets, and Baltimore Orioles, and in the KBO League for the NC Dinos. Prior to playing professionally, he played for Calallen High School and Baylor University.

== Amateur career ==
Verrett spent his early years in The Woodlands, Texas, where he played Little League Baseball as an infielder. Before he began high school, his family moved to Corpus Christi, and he played for Calallen High School's varsity baseball team as a pitcher. In 2008, his senior year, he became the staff's ace pitcher, recording an 18–0 win–loss record, a 0.67 earned run average (ERA), 167 strikeouts, and 12 complete games. He also had a .455 batting average, seven home runs, and 33 runs batted in on the year. With a 42–1 win–loss record, his team went on to win the Texas Class 4A state championship. That year, he was named the All-South Texas Most Valuable Player and the Class 4A Player of the Year by the Texas Sports Writers Association.

Verrett enrolled at Baylor University to play college baseball for the Baylor Bears baseball team. As a relief pitcher in his freshman year, he recorded seven wins and a save in his first eight appearances, and served as the team's closer. He moved into the team's starting rotation as a sophomore, and finished the year with a 5–3 win–loss record, a 3.28 ERA, and 97 strikeouts in 90 2/3 innings pitched. As a junior, Verrett compiled a 7–6 win–loss record, a 2.93 ERA, 96 strikeouts in 101 1/3 innings pitched, and had two complete games. In 2009 and 2010, he played collegiate summer baseball with the Chatham Anglers of the Cape Cod Baseball League. Hed was named a league all-star in 2010.

== Professional career ==
=== New York Mets ===
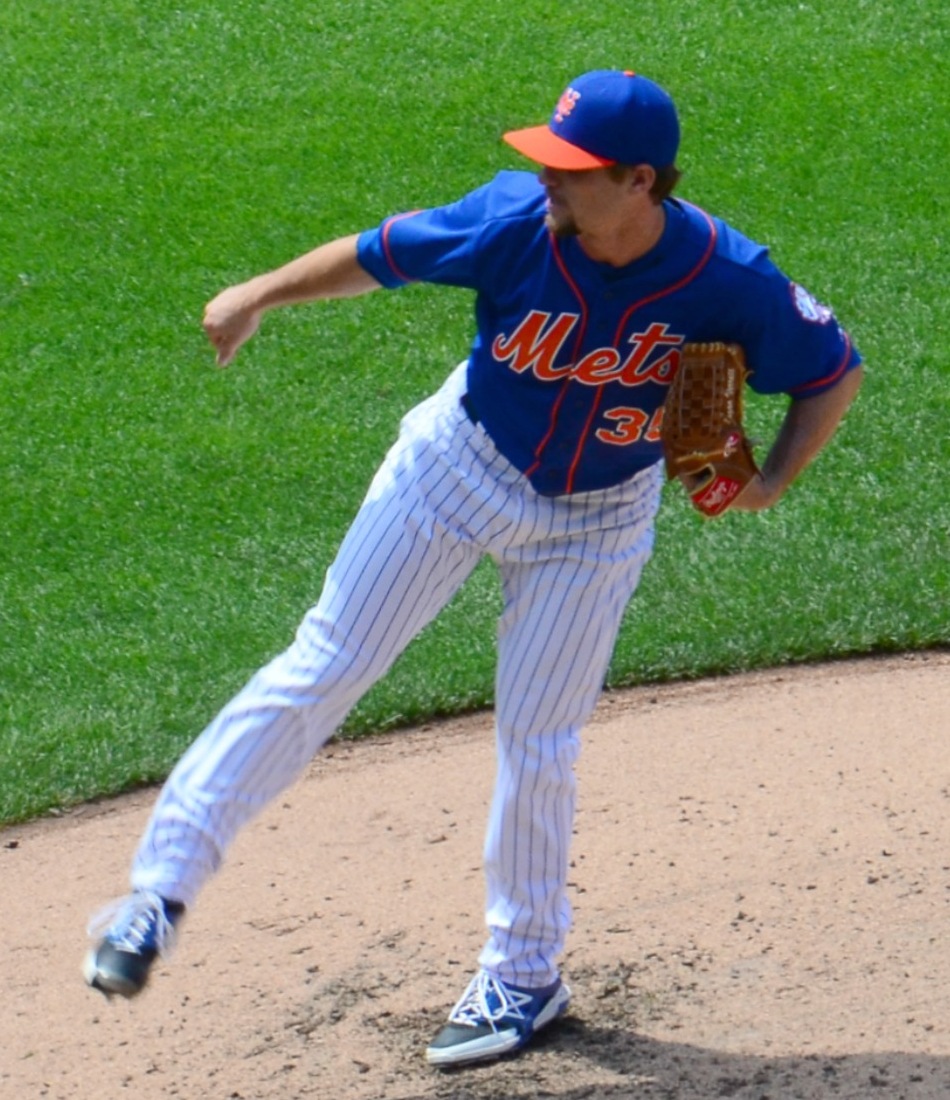
Verrett pitching against the Cincinnati Reds on June 28, 2015.

The New York Mets selected Verrett in the third round, with the 101st overall selection, of the 2011 MLB draft. Verrett signed with the Mets, receiving a $425,000 signing bonus. He signed just before the August signing deadline, and did not make his professional debut until 2012, when he began the season with the Savannah Sand Gnats of the Single–A South Atlantic League. During the season, he received a promotion to the St. Lucie Mets of the High–A Florida State League in July. Between the two levels, he finished the year with a 5–2 win–loss record, a 2.70 ERA, and 93 strikeouts in 103 innings pitched, despite missing two months due to a strained rotator cuff. He was named the South Texas Professional Player of the Year by the Corpus Christi Hooks, who play in the Double–A Texas League.

Verrett pitched for the Binghamton Mets of the Double–A Eastern League in 2013, finishing the season with a 12–6 win–loss record, a 4.25 ERA, a 1.144 walks plus hits per innings pitched ratio and 146 strikeouts in 24 games started. The Mets invited Verrett to spring training in 2014 as a non-roster player. He pitched for the Las Vegas 51s of the Triple–A Pacific Coast League in 2014, where he had an 11–5 record and a 4.33 ERA in 28 games.

=== Texas Rangers ===
On December 11, 2014, during the Winter Meetings, the Baltimore Orioles selected Verrett from the Mets in the Rule 5 draft. After competing for a spot on the Orioles' Opening Day roster in spring training in 2015, the Orioles waived Verrett with the hopes of him going unclaimed so that they could work out a trade with the Mets, allowing them to keep Verrett. Instead, he was claimed on waivers by the Texas Rangers on April 2, 2015. Verrett made the Rangers' Opening Day roster. He made four appearances with the Rangers, pitching to a 6.00 ERA in nine innings, before he was designated for assignment by the Rangers on April 24. With the Rangers, he finished 0–1, 6.00 ERA in four games pitching nine innings with a WHIP of 1.667 while giving up 11 hits, seven runs (six of them earned), one home run, and four walks and striking out three batters.

=== New York Mets (second stint) ===
The Rangers returned Verrett to the Mets on May 4, 2015, and assigned to Las Vegas. After Verrett pitched to a 2–0 win–loss record and a 3.00 ERA in 11 appearances, four of which were starts, the Mets promoted Verrett to the major leagues on June 18. Verrett pitched to a 0.73 ERA with 12 strikeouts in 12 1/3 innings before the Mets optioned him to Las Vegas due to the activation of Jenrry Mejía from the suspended list on July 7. The Mets promoted Verrett to the major leagues on August 18, when Bobby Parnell went on the disabled list. In his first major league start in place of Matt Harvey, Verrett pitched eight innings, striking out eight and giving up one run in his first career win against the Colorado Rockies at Coors Field with the Mets winning 5–1. Verrett finished the 2015 season with a 1–1 record and 3.03 ERA in 38 2/3 innings pitched.

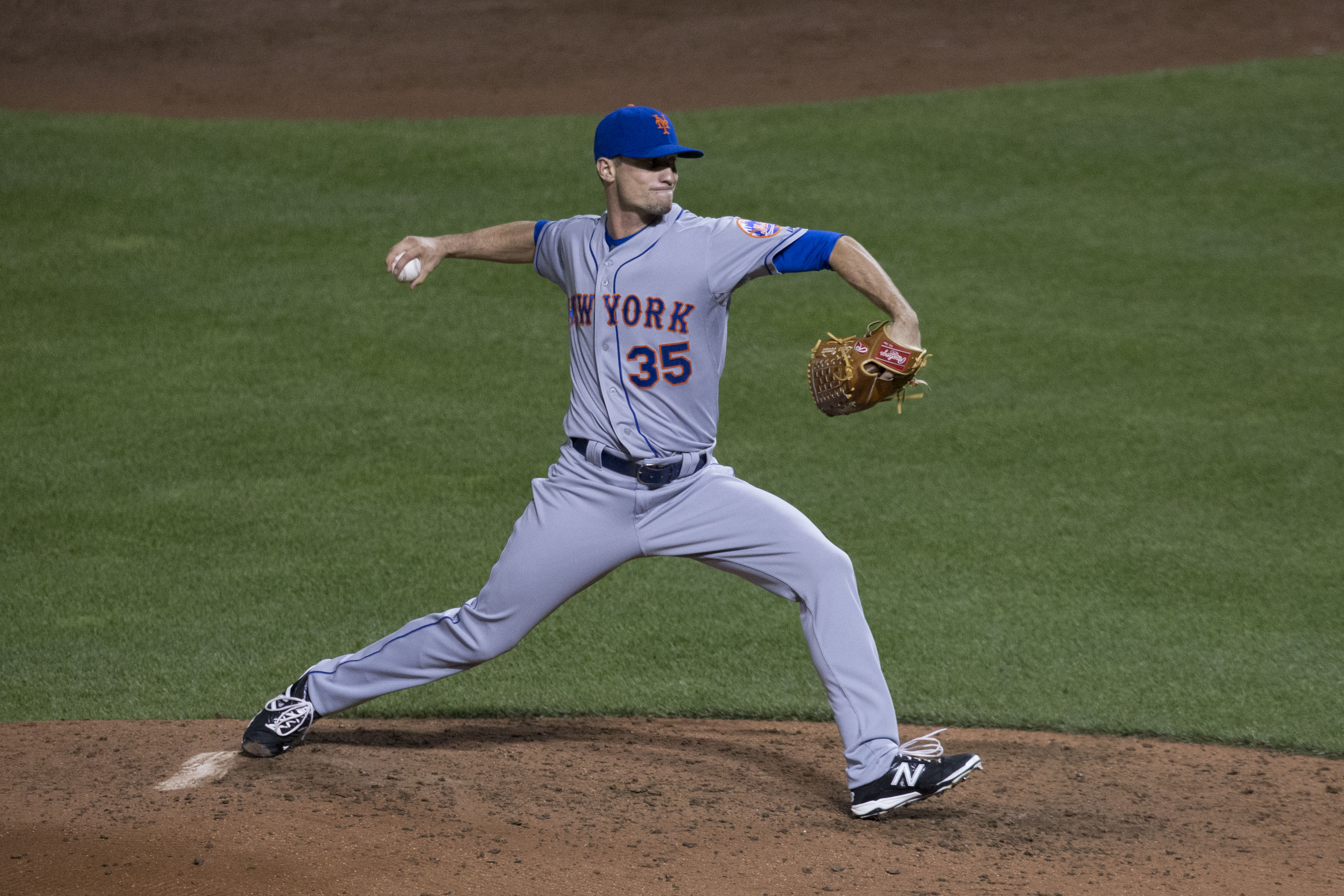
Verrett with the New York Mets in 2015

Verrett made the Mets' roster for Opening Day in 2016. On April 13, 2016, Verrett made his first start of the season and second of his career against the Miami Marlins at Citi Field in place of Jacob deGrom. Verrett pitched six scoreless innings, and received a no decision.

On April 19, 2016, he made his second start of the year against the Philadelphia Phillies at Citizens Bank Park. He once again pitched six scoreless innings just allowing six hits, one walk and striking out four for his first win of the season. The Mets would go on to win 11–1. In his first two starts, he hasn't allowed a run while striking out ten in twelve innings. Verrett also recorded his first major league hit, a double on 1–0 pitch from the opposing pitcher Vince Velasquez to lead off the fifth inning.

=== Baltimore Orioles ===
On November 30, 2016, Verrett was traded to the Baltimore Orioles in exchange for cash considerations. He made his Orioles debut on April 30, 2017, pitching two scoreless innings and getting the win against the New York Yankees. In 4 games for Baltimore, he posted a 4.22 ERA with 9 strikeouts over 10 2/3 innings pitched. Verrett was designated for assignment by the Orioles on September 1. He cleared waivers and was sent outright to the Triple–A Norfolk Tides on September 5. Verrett elected free agency on September 30.

=== NC Dinos ===
On November 18, 2017, Verrett signed a one-year contract worth $800,000 with the NC Dinos of the KBO League. He became a free agent following the season.

=== Oakland Athletics ===
On February 8, 2019, Verrett signed a minor league deal with the Oakland Athletics. He made 7 appearances (4 starts) for the Double–A Midland RockHounds, recording a 3.93 ERA with 33 strikeouts across 34 1/3 innings pitched. Verrett elected free agency following the season on November 4.

=== Cleburne Railroaders ===
On March 12, 2021, Verrett signed with the Cleburne Railroaders of the American Association of Professional Baseball. Verrett made one appearance for Cleburne, pitching six innings of one–run ball.

=== Seattle Mariners ===
On May 23, 2021, Verrett’s contract was purchased by the Seattle Mariners organization. Verrett made 19 starts with the Triple-A Tacoma Rainiers, going 11–4 with a 4.74 ERA and 88 strikeouts. He became a free agent following the season.

=== Washington Nationals ===
On February 18, 2022, Verrett signed a minor league contract with the Washington Nationals. In 24 games (21 starts) for the Triple-A Rochester Red Wings, he compiled an 8-9 record and 3.80 ERA with 102 strikeouts across 125 2/3 innings pitched. Verrett elected free agency following the season on November 10.

== Personal life ==
Verrett and his wife, Erin, reside in Arlington, Texas.
