= Johnny Monell =

American baseball player (born 1986)

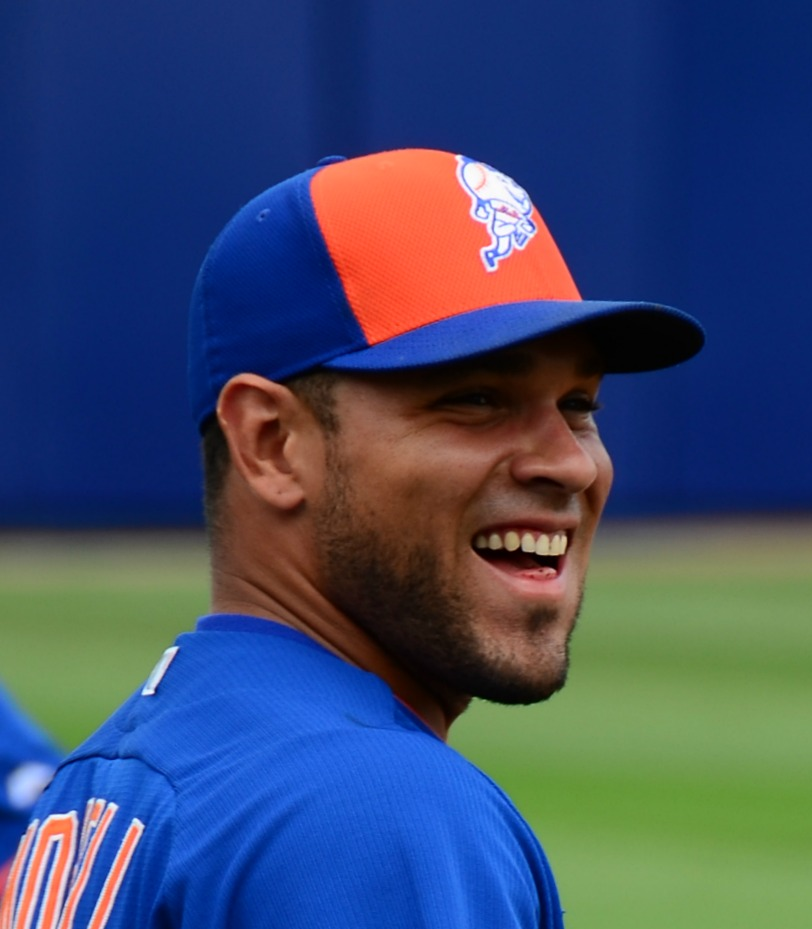
- Monell with the New York Mets
- Catcher / First baseman
- Born: March 4, 1986 (age 40); Bronx, New York, U.S.
- Batted: Left Threw: Right

Professional debut
- MLB: September 5, 2013, for the San Francisco Giants
- KBO: March 31, 2017, for the KT Wiz

Last appearance
- MLB: October 4, 2015, for the New York Mets
- KBO: May 18, 2017, for the KT Wiz

MLB statistics
- Batting average: .161
- Home runs: 0
- Runs batted in: 5

KBO statistics
- Batting average: .165
- Home runs: 2
- Runs batted in: 9
- Stats at Baseball Reference

Teams
- San Francisco Giants (2013); New York Mets (2015); KT Wiz (2017)

Johnny Monell (born March 4, 1986) is an American former professional baseball catcher. He played in Major League Baseball (MLB) for the San Francisco Giants and New York Mets, and in the KBO League for the KT Wiz.

== High school career ==
Born and raised in the Pelham Park section of the Bronx, New York, Monell attended Christopher Columbus High School. Monell's father, Johnny Sr., spent 17 years in professional baseball but never made it to the major league level. Monell was originally drafted out of high school by the San Francisco Giants but decided to attend Seminole Community College. Monell was then drafted by the New York Mets in the 49th round in 2006, but turned it down. In 2007, Monell was drafted again by the Giants, this time in the 30th round, and he finally signed.

== Professional career ==
=== San Francisco Giants ===
Monell was originally drafted by the San Francisco Giants in the 27th round of the 2005 MLB draft out of Christopher Columbus High School in Bronx, New York. He did not sign, and instead played at Seminole Community College. The New York Mets then drafted him in the 49th round of the 2006 MLB draft but he returned to college. Finally he was drafted by the Giants in the 30th round of the 2007 MLB draft and signed.

Monell was called up to the majors for the first time on September 2, 2013, by the Giants. He flew out to left center field in his debut as a pinch hitter against the Arizona Diamondbacks on September 5. His first Major League hit was a single off of Peter Moylan of the Los Angeles Dodgers on September 14. That was his only hit in 8 at-bats for the Giants that September. He was designated for assignment on November 27.

=== Baltimore Orioles ===
Monell was sold to the Baltimore Orioles on November 30, 2013, who then designated him for assignment again on March 24, 2014. He cleared waivers and was sent outright to the Triple-A Norfolk Tides on March 28. In 30 appearances for Norfolk, Monell slashed .209/.280/.286 with one home run, seven RBI, and one stolen base.

=== Los Angeles Dodgers ===
On May 28, 2014, Monell was traded to the Los Angeles Dodgers in exchange for cash, and assigned to the Triple-A Albuquerque Isotopes. In 38 games for the Isotopes, he batted .261/.318/.426 with three home runs, 17 RBI, and three stolen bases.

=== New York Mets ===
Monell signed a minor league deal with the New York Mets on November 6, 2014. He was called up to the Mets on May 5, 2015. Monell finished the 2015 season appearing in 27 games with .167 batting average in 48 at-bats in 52 plate appearances while compiling eight hits, four walks, four RBI, and five runs scored. On December 18, Monell was designated for assignment to clear roster space for Bartolo Colón. On December 23, Monell was sent outright to the Las Vegas 51s after clearing waivers.

=== KT Wiz ===
On December 9, 2016, Monell signed with the KT Wiz of the KBO League. In 28 appearances for the team, he batted .165/.305/.282 with two home runs, nine RBI, and two stolen bases. On May 18, 2017, Monell was released by the Wiz.

=== New York Mets (second stint) ===
On January 26, 2018, Monell signed a minor league contract with the Tampa Bay Rays organization. He was released by Tampa Bay prior to the start of the season on March 28.

On April 13, 2018, it was announced that Monell had signed a minor league contract with the New York Mets organization following injuries to two Mets catchers. In 61 appearances for the Triple-A Las Vegas 51s, he slashed .263/.330/.407 with three home runs and 34 RBI. Monell retired from professional baseball on August 4, for unspecified reasons.

== Coaching career ==
Monell is currently the owner and primary coach of 220 Second to None, a training and coaching facility in Absecon, New Jersey, as of May 2, 2025.
