= Kirk Nieuwenhuis =

American baseball player (born 1987)

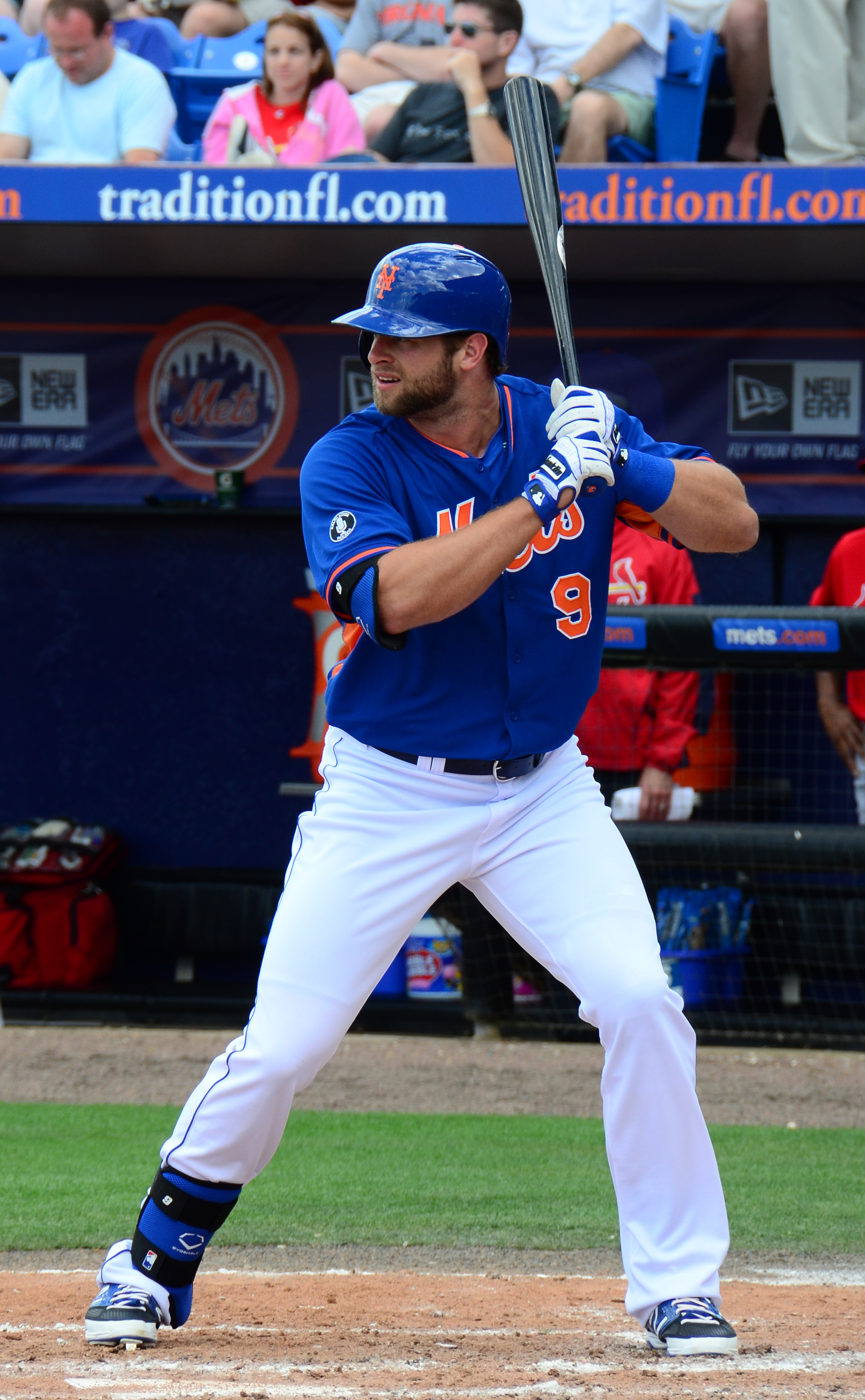
- Nieuwenhuis with the New York Mets in 2014

Azusa Pacific Cougars
- Outfielder
- Born: August 7, 1987 (age 39); Santa Monica, California, U.S.
- Batted: Left Threw: Right

MLB debut
- April 7, 2012, for the New York Mets

Last MLB appearance
- July 29, 2017, for the Milwaukee Brewers

MLB statistics
- Batting average: .221
- Home runs: 31
- Runs batted in: 117
- Stats at Baseball Reference

Teams
- New York Mets (2012–2015); Los Angeles Angels of Anaheim (2015); New York Mets (2015); Milwaukee Brewers (2016–2017)

Kirk Robert Nieuwenhuis (born August 7, 1987) is an American former professional baseball outfielder who played in Major League Baseball (MLB) for the New York Mets, Los Angeles Angels of Anaheim, and Milwaukee Brewers. He currently is the head baseball coach at his alma mater Azusa Pacific University.

== Amateur career ==
Nieuwenhuis attended Denver Christian High School in Lakewood, Colorado where he played football, basketball and baseball. As a football player, Nieuwenhuis was an elusive running back who led Denver Christian to a state championship and received scholarship offers from Colorado, Colorado State and Air Force. However, Nieuwenhuis feared that he lacked the size to succeed as a football player at the next level and that he would be converted to a wide receiver and made to redshirt as a freshman. He therefore decided to focus on baseball.

As a high school baseball player, Nieuwenhuis was a lightly recruited second baseman and pitcher whose fastball reached 90 miles per hour. Nieuwenhuis played three seasons of baseball at Azusa Pacific University in Azusa, California. There he led the Cougars to back-to-back NAIA World Series appearances in 2007 and 2008 and set school career records in runs scored, with 190, and triples, with 12.

== Professional career ==
=== New York Mets ===
Nieuwenhuis was drafted by the New York Mets in the third round of the 2008 Major League Baseball draft out of the Azusa Pacific University. In the minors, Nieuwenhuis primarily was a center fielder, and after hitting .298 in Triple-A Buffalo, Nieuwenhuis was added to the Mets 40 man roster on November 18, 2011. After performing well during his debut with the Mets, Nieuwenhuis garnered the moniker "Captain Kirk" from Mets fans, in reference to the fictional Captain Kirk from the 1960s television series Star Trek.

==== 2008–2011 ====
Nieuwenhuis began his professional career with the Brooklyn Cyclones in the New York–Penn League, where he played 74 games and hit .277. Nieuwenhuis had 15 doubles, five triples and three home runs among 79 hits in 319 plate appearances. Following his first professional season, Nieuwenhuis continued to play well throughout the Mets' Minor League system. He played at every level, finishing the 2010 campaign with the Triple-A Buffalo Bisons. In 2011, Nieuwenhuis was shut down with a torn labrum in his non-throwing shoulder. It cost him most of the second half of his season.

==== 2012 ====
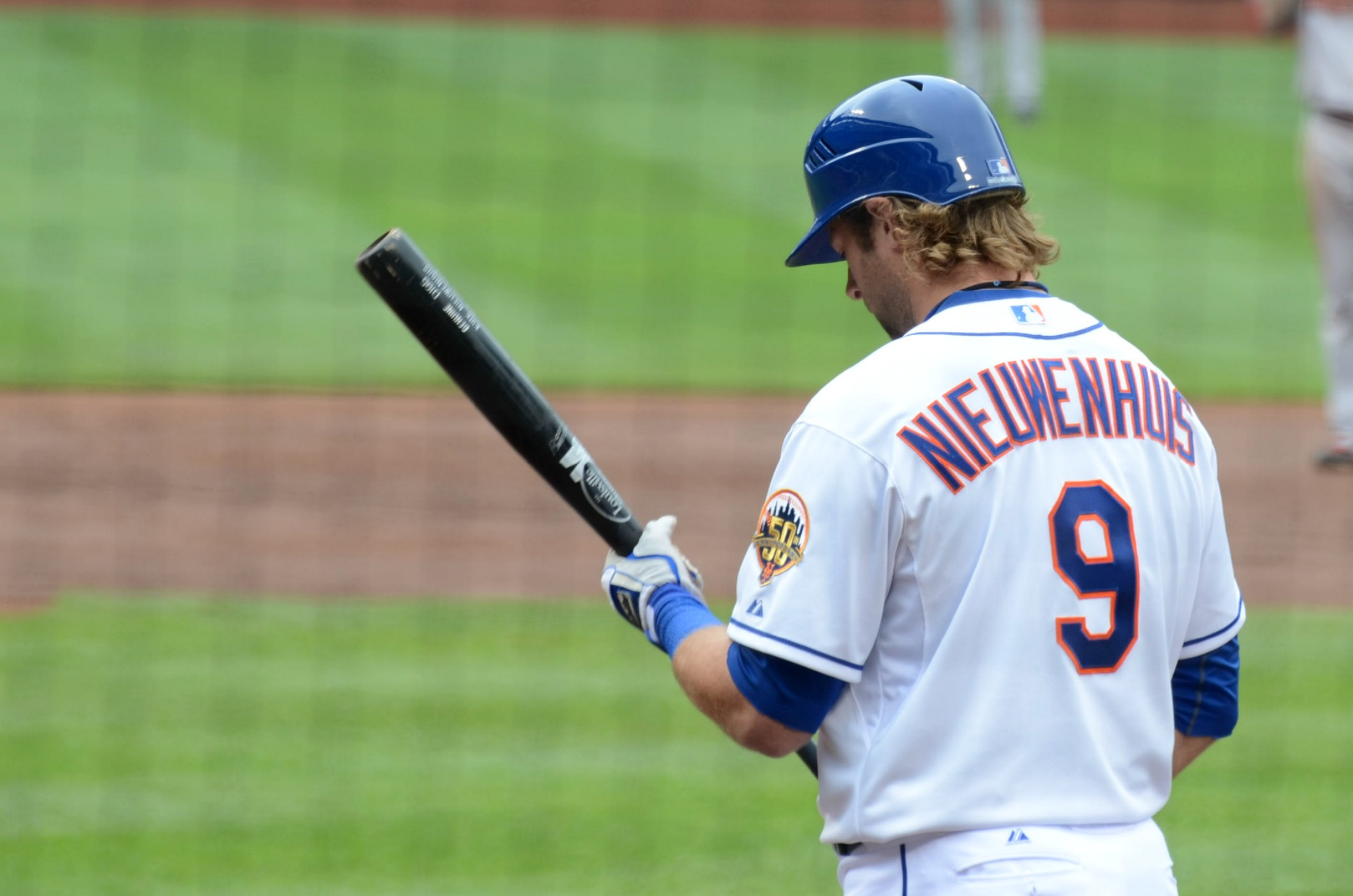
Nieuwenhuis with the Mets in 2012

Nieuwenhuis was called up by the Mets on April 7, 2012, to replace the injured Andrés Torres. Nieuwenhuis got his first major league hit, an infield single, on the same day he was called up; Nieuwenhuis finished the day 2-4. On April 9, in only his second start and third major league game, Nieuwenhuis hit his first Major League home run against Washington Nationals pitcher Edwin Jackson. On April 27, he hit a walk-off single off of Miami Marlins closer Heath Bell giving the Mets the series sweep against the Marlins.

Though he garnered early National League Rookie of the Year consideration for his .297 average, six home runs and superlative outfield defense through June 15, Nieuwenhuis batted .123 with one home run after that date, striking out in more than 44 percent of his plate appearances. By July 28, Nieuwenhuis was batting .252 with 7 home runs and 28 RBIs and on July 30, he was optioned to the Mets Triple-A affiliate, the Buffalo Bisons, to make way for Mike Baxter and Jason Bay who were coming off of the disabled list. On August 6 while with Buffalo, Nieuwenhuis was diagnosed with a partial tear of the plantar fascia in his right foot, which occurred while running down the first-base line just days after being optioned by the Mets. He reported to Port St. Lucie for rehab, then on August 22, he was shut down for the rest of the season to heal his foot. Through 91 games and 282 at bats, Niewenhuis was batting .252 with 7 home runs and 28 RBIs, while playing the outfield for the Mets.

==== 2013–2015 ====
In late April, Nieuwenhuis was demoted to the Triple-A Buffalo Bisons after hitting 2 for 16 for the Mets in April. However, he was called back up to the Mets to take Rick Ankiel's spot on the roster. Nieuwenhuis had been hitting .232 at Triple-A before his promotion.

On June 10, 2013, Nieuwenhuis was again called up to the Mets playing center field.

Nieuwenhuis played in 61 games with the Mets in 2014. Over 112 at-bats he hit .259 with an .828 OPS and three home runs.

Nieuwenhuis was designated for assignment on May 19, 2015.

=== Los Angeles Angels of Anaheim ===
Nieuwenhuis was traded to the Los Angeles Angels of Anaheim for cash considerations on May 27, 2015. He was designated for assignment on June 10.

=== Second stint with Mets ===
Nieuwenhuis was claimed by the New York Mets 17 days after the Mets traded him to the Los Angeles Angels of Anaheim. Nieuwenhuis was sent to the Las Vegas 51s and was later promoted back to the Mets on July 6, 2015.

On July 12, he hit three home runs in a game against the Arizona Diamondbacks, becoming the first player to accomplish this at Citi Field. He is the tenth player in franchise history to hit three home runs in one game and the first to do so in a Mets' home game. When interviewed after his exceptional game that day, Kirk commented in response to his critics: "there's more to life than baseball". On July 29, Lucas Duda joined Nieuwenhuis as the second Met to accomplish the feat at home.

On September 8, 2015, Nieuwenhuis hit a pinch-hit, go-ahead home run off Jonathan Papelbon of the Washington Nationals, breaking an eighth inning tie and handing the Mets an 8-7 win, a game in which the Mets had once trailed 7–1. After their third consecutive comeback win the next day, the Mets swept the Nats, moving themselves to 7.0 games ahead in the NL East.

=== Milwaukee Brewers ===
On December 23, 2015, Nieuwenhuis was claimed by the Milwaukee Brewers off of waivers. He was one of nine players competing to be the Brewers center fielder for the 2016 season. Nieuwenhuis made 125 appearances for Milwaukee on the year, batting .209/.324/.385 with career-highs in home runs (13), RBI (44), and stolen bases (8). On December 3, 2016, Nieuwenhuis and the Brewers agreed to a one-year, $900,000 contract for the 2017 season.

On April 21, 2017, Niewenhuis was designated for assignment by the Brewers. He cleared waivers and was sent outright to the Triple-A Colorado Springs Sky Sox on April 23. On July 29, the Brewers selected Nieuwenhuis' contract, adding him back to their active roster. He was designated for assignment following the acquisition of Jeremy Jeffress on July 31. In 16 total games for the team, Nieuwenhuis batted went 3-for-26 (.115) with one home run, one RBI, and four walks. He cleared waivers and was sent outright to Triple-A on August 3. Niewenhuis elected free agency on October 6.

=== Seattle Mariners ===
On November 14, 2017, Nieuwenhuis signed a minor league contract with the Seattle Mariners. He was assigned to the Triple-A Tacoma Rainiers for the 2018 season. Nieuwenhuis was released by the organization on August 2, 2018.

=== Long Island Ducks ===
On March 19, 2019, Nieuwenhuis signed with the Long Island Ducks of the Atlantic League of Professional Baseball. In 62 games for Long Island, he hit .259/.322/.468 with 11 home runs, 41 RBI, and seven stolen bases.

On July 12, 2019, Nieuwenhuis announced his retirement from professional baseball.

== Coaching career ==
In 2020, Nieuwenhuis went back to Azusa Pacific University, as the hitting coordinator for the baseball team. He was named the head coach in December 2021.

== Personal life ==
Nieuwenhuis and his wife Bethany married in 2013.
