= 2013 New York Mets season =

2013 New York Mets
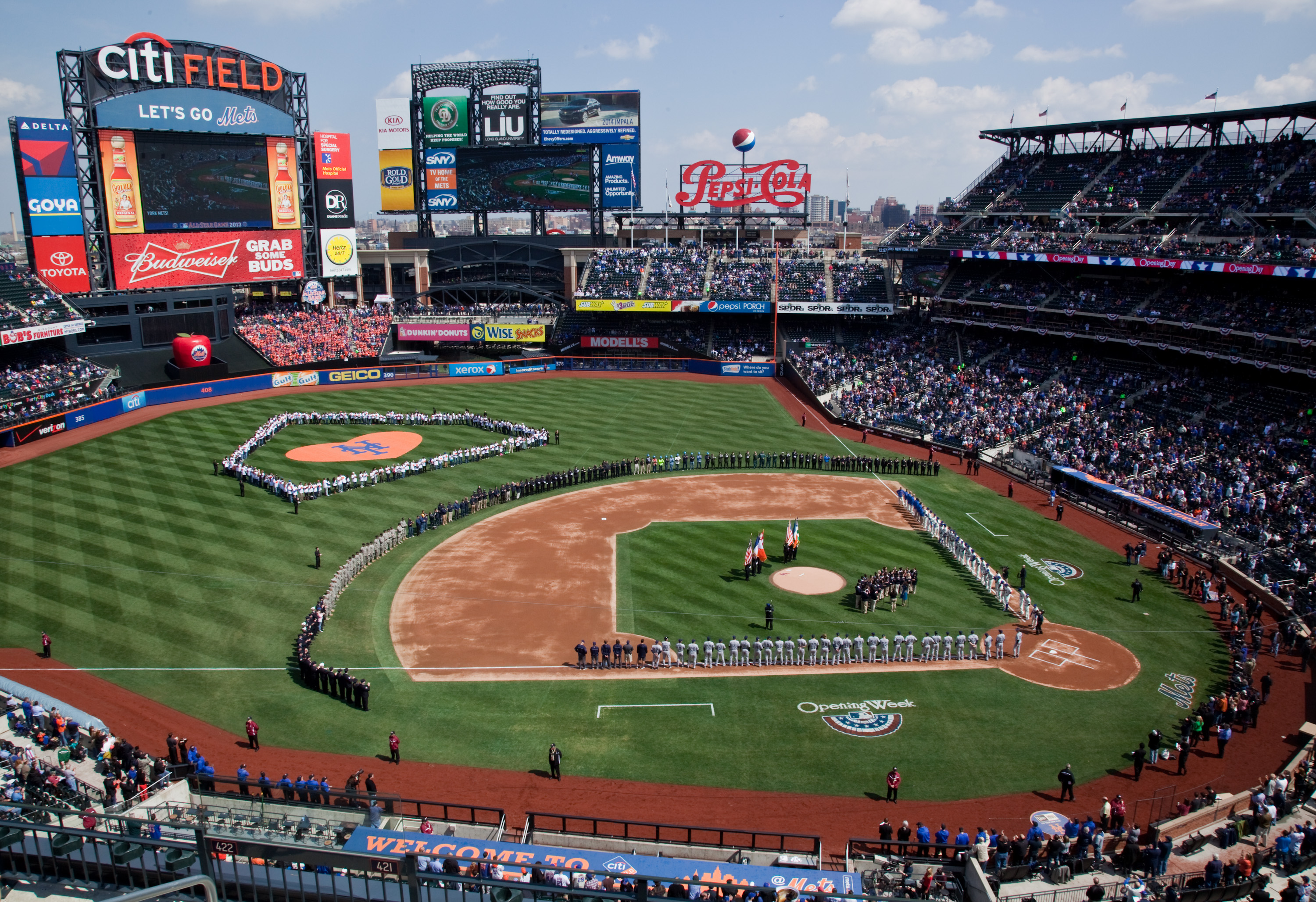
- Opening Day at Citi Field on April 1, 2013
- League: National League
- Division: East
- Ballpark: Citi Field
- City: New York, New York
- Record: 74–88 (.457)
- Divisional place: 3rd
- Owners: Fred Wilpon
- General manager: Sandy Alderson
- Manager: Terry Collins
- Television: SportsNet New York; WPIX (CW affiliate) (Gary Cohen, Ron Darling, Keith Hernandez, Ralph Kiner, Kevin Burkhardt)
- Radio: WFAN / WFAN-FM (English); New York Mets Radio Network (Howie Rose, Josh Lewin, Ed Coleman); WQBU-FM (Spanish) (Juan Alicea, Max Perez Jiminez)

The 2013 New York Mets season was the 52nd season of the franchise. The Mets hosted the 2013 MLB All-Star Game on July 16 at Citi Field. They finished the season with a 74–88 record and third place in the National League East. It was the Mets' first non-fourth-place finish since 2008. It was also the final season for Ralph Kiner, who had been with their broadcast team since its first season in 1962.

== Offseason ==
The Mets lost their rights to the Minor League Baseball affiliate Buffalo Bisons as their AAA team. For 2013–15, the Mets agreed to a deal to claim the Las Vegas 51s as their newest minor league affiliate for Triple–A.

On November 7, 2012, the Mets and outfielder Jason Bay agreed to part ways, with the team buying out the $21 million remaining on his contract and releasing him.

On December 17, the Mets and the Toronto Blue Jays agreed to a deal sending 2012 Cy Young Award winner R. A. Dickey, Josh Thole and Mike Nickeas to Toronto in exchange for prospects Travis d'Arnaud, Noah Syndergaard, Wuilmer Becerra, and veteran catcher John Buck.

== Regular season ==
On May 30, 2013, the Mets swept the New York Yankees for the second time in the history of the modern Subway Series. The Yankees had swept six games from the Mets in 2003.

On August 30, 2013, the Mets traded catcher John Buck and outfielder Marlon Byrd through the waiver process, to the Pittsburgh Pirates. The Mets received reliever Vic Black and Dilson Herrera.

On September 1, 2013, Sandy Alderson announced he expects manager Terry Collins to not be fired by the club. Fans and certain media members have been publicly criticizing Collins' moves in games, and his general managing presence, and repertoire.

== Season standings ==
=== National League East ===
NL East
Team	W	L	Pct.	GB	Home	Road
Atlanta Braves	96	66	.593	—	56‍–‍25	40‍–‍41
Washington Nationals	86	76	.531	10	47‍–‍34	39‍–‍42
New York Mets	74	88	.457	22	33‍–‍48	41‍–‍40
Philadelphia Phillies	73	89	.451	23	43‍–‍38	30‍–‍51
Miami Marlins	62	100	.383	34	36‍–‍45	26‍–‍55

=== National League division champs ===
Division winners
Team	W	L	Pct.
St. Louis Cardinals	97	65	.599
Atlanta Braves	96	66	.593
Los Angeles Dodgers	92	70	.568

Wild Card teams (Top 2 teams qualify for postseason)
Team	W	L	Pct.	GB
Pittsburgh Pirates	94	68	.580	+4
Cincinnati Reds	90	72	.556	—
Washington Nationals	86	76	.531	4
Arizona Diamondbacks	81	81	.500	9
San Francisco Giants	76	86	.469	14
San Diego Padres	76	86	.469	14
Colorado Rockies	74	88	.457	16
New York Mets	74	88	.457	16
Milwaukee Brewers	74	88	.457	16
Philadelphia Phillies	73	89	.451	17
Chicago Cubs	66	96	.407	24
Miami Marlins	62	100	.383	28

== Record vs. opponents ==
2013 National League record Source: MLB Standings Grid – 2013
Team	AZ	ATL	CHC	CIN	COL	LAD	MIA	MIL	NYM	PHI	PIT	SD	SF	STL	WSH	AL
Arizona	—	2–4	4–3	3–4	12–7	10–9	4–2	6–1	3–4	3–4	3–3	7–12	7–12	4–3	2–4	11–9
Atlanta	4–2	—	5–1	4–3	6–1	5–2	13–6	2–4	10–9	11–8	4–3	1–5	3–4	4–3	13–6	11–9
Chicago	3–4	1–5	—	5–14	3–3	1–6	4–3	6–13	3–3	3–3	7–12	3–4	4–3	7–12	3–4	13–7
Cincinnati	4–3	3–4	14–5	—	2–4	4–3	6–1	10–9	4–2	4–2	8–11	3–3	6–1	8–11	3–4	11–9
Colorado	7–12	1–6	3–3	4–2	—	10–9	3–4	4–2	3–4	3–4	4–2	12–7	9–10	3–4	3–4	5–15
Los Angeles	9–10	2–5	6–1	3–4	9–10	—	5–2	4–2	5–1	5–2	4–2	11–8	8–11	4–3	5–1	12–8
Miami	2–4	6–13	3–4	1–6	4–3	2–5	—	1–5	11–8	7–12	2–4	3–4	4–3	2–4	5–14	9–11
Milwaukee	1–6	4–2	13–6	9–10	2–4	2–4	5–1	—	4–3	5–2	7–12	3–4	5–2	5–14	3–4	6–14
New York	4–3	9–10	3–3	2–4	4–3	1–5	8–11	3–4	—	10–9	2–5	4–3	4–2	2–5	7–12	11–9
Philadelphia	4–3	8–11	3–3	2–4	4–3	2–5	12–7	2–5	9–10	—	3–4	4–2	3–3	2–5	8–11	7–13
Pittsburgh	3–3	3–4	12–7	11–8	2–4	2–4	4–2	12–7	5–2	4–3	—	3–4	4–3	10–9	4–3	15–5
San Diego	12–7	5–1	4–3	3–3	7–12	8–11	4–3	4–3	3–4	2–4	4–3	—	8–11	2–4	2–5	8–12
San Francisco	12–7	4–3	3–4	1–6	10–9	11–8	3–4	2–5	2–4	3–3	3–4	11–8	—	2–4	3–3	6–14
St. Louis	3–4	3–4	12–7	11–8	4–3	3–4	4–2	14–5	5–2	5–2	9–10	4–2	4–2	—	6–0	10–10
Washington	4–2	6–13	4–3	4–3	4–3	1–5	14–5	4–3	12–7	11–8	3–4	5–2	3–3	0–6	—	11–9

== Game log ==
Legend
Mets Win	Mets Loss	Game Postponed
Bold = Mets team member

2013 Game Log
Overall: 74–88 (Home: 33–48; Away: 41–40)
April: 10–15 (Home: 7–8; Away: 3–7)

#	Date	Opponent	Box Score	Win	Loss	Save	Location (Attendance)	Record
1	April 1	Padres	11–2	**Jon Niese** (1–0)	Edinson Vólquez (0–1)		Citi Field (41,053)	1–0
2	April 3	Padres	8–4	**Matt Harvey** (1–0)	Clayton Richard (0–1)		Citi Field (22,239)	2–0
3	April 4	Padres	1–2	Eric Stults (1–0)	**Dillon Gee** (0–1)	Huston Street (1)	Citi Field (21,519)	2–1
4	April 5	Marlins	5–7	Alex Sanabia (1–0)	**Jeremy Hefner** (0–1)		Citi Field (24,935)	2–2
5	April 6	Marlins	7–3	**Brandon Lyon** (1–0)	Ryan Webb (0–1)		Citi Field (28,474)	3–2
6	April 7	Marlins	4–3	**Scott Rice** (1–0)	Steve Cishek (0–1)		Citi Field (29,780)	4–2
7	April 8	@Phillies	7–2	**Matt Harvey** (2–0)	Roy Halladay (0–2)		Citizens Bank Park (35,393)	5–2
8	April 9	@Phillies	3–8	Cliff Lee (2–0)	**Dillon Gee** (0–2)		Citizens Bank Park (38,305)	5–3
9	April 10	@Phillies	3–7	Kyle Kendrick (1–1)	**Jeremy Hefner** (0–2)		Citizens Bank Park (38,715)	5–4
10	April 12	@Twins	16–5	**Jon Niese** (2–0)	Vance Worley (0–2)		Target Field (23,735)	6–4
11	April 13	@Twins	4–2	**Matt Harvey** (3–0)	Scott Diamond (0–1)	**Bobby Parnell** (1)	Target Field (28,804)	7–4
	April 14	@Twins	Postponed (snow); Rescheduled for August 19				Target Field	
	April 15	@Rockies	Postponed (snow); Rescheduled as split doubleheader on April 16				Coors Field	
12	April 16	@Rockies	4–8	Juan Nicasio (2–0)	**Dillon Gee** (0–3)		Coors Field (21,510)	7–5
13	April 16	@Rockies	8–9	Rafael Betancourt (1–0)	**Greg Burke** (0–1)		Coors Field (20,239)	7–6
	April 17	@Rockies	Postponed (snow); Rescheduled for June 27				Coors Field	
14	April 18	@Rockies	3–11	Jon Garland (2–0)	**Jon Niese** (2–1)		Coors Field (18,341)	7–7
15	April 19	Nationals	7–1	**Matt Harvey** (4–0)	Stephen Strasburg (1–3)		Citi Field (26,675)	8–7
16	April 20	Nationals	6–7	Tyler Clippard (1–0)	**Josh Edgin** (0–1)	Rafael Soriano (6)	Citi Field (24,325)	8–8
17	April 21	Nationals	2–0	**Dillon Gee** (1–3)	Jordan Zimmermann (3–1)	**Bobby Parnell** (2)	Citi Field (26,225)	9–8
18	April 23	Dodgers	2–7	Ronald Belisario (1–2)	**Brandon Lyon** (1–1)		Citi Field (21,135)	9–9
19	April 24	Dodgers	7–3 (10)	**Bobby Parnell** (1–0)	Josh Wall (0–1)		Citi Field (24,130)	10–9
20	April 25	Dodgers	2–3	Kenley Jansen (1–0)	**Scott Rice** (1–1)	Brandon League (6)	Citi Field (24,851)	10–10
21	April 26	Phillies	0–4	Kyle Kendrick (2–1)	**Dillon Gee** (1–4)		Citi Field (21,582)	10–11
22	April 27	Phillies	4–9	Jonathan Pettibone (1–0)	**Shaun Marcum** (0–1)		Citi Field (29,248)	10–12
23	April 28	Phillies	1–5	Cole Hamels (1–3)	**Jon Niese** (2–2)		Citi Field (28,990)	10–13
24	April 29	@Marlins	3–4 (15)	Jon Rauch (1–2)	**Shaun Marcum** (0–2)		Marlins Park (15,605)	10–14
25	April 30	@Marlins	1–2	Ryan Webb (1–1)	**Jeremy Hefner** (0–3)		Marlins Park (15,018)	10–15

May: 12–15 (Home: 5–9; Away: 7–6)

#	Date	Opponent	Score	Win	Loss	Save	Location (Attendance)	Record
26	May 1	@Marlins	7–6	**Dillon Gee** (2–4)	A. J. Ramos (0–1)	**Bobby Parnell** (3)	Marlins Park (16,188)	11–15
27	May 3	@Braves	7–5	**Bobby Parnell** (2–0)	Jordan Walden (1–1)	**Jeurys Familia** (1)	Turner Field (30,871)	12–15
	May 4	@Braves	Postponed (rain); Rescheduled as split doubleheader on June 18				Turner Field	
28	May 5	@Braves	4–9	Tim Hudson (4–1)	**Jon Niese** (2–3)		Turner Field (32,849)	12–16
29	May 7	White Sox	1–0 (10)	**Bobby Parnell** (3–0)	Nate Jones (0–3)		Citi Field (23,394)	13–16
30	May 8	White Sox	3–6	Jake Peavy (4–1)	**Jeremy Hefner** (0–4)		Citi Field (21,470)	13–17
31	May 9	Pirates	3–2	**Bobby Parnell** (4–0)	Jason Grilli (0–1)		Citi Field (20,147)	14–17
32	May 10	Pirates	3–7	Wandy Rodríguez (3–2)	**Shaun Marcum** (0–3)	Jason Grilli (14)	Citi Field (25,123)	14–18
33	May 11	Pirates	2–11	Francisco Liriano (1–0)	**Jon Niese** (2–4)		Citi Field (31,160)	14–19
34	May 12	Pirates	2–3	Justin Wilson (3–0)	**Scott Rice** (1–2)	Jason Grilli (15)	Citi Field (28,404)	14–20
35	May 13	@Cardinals	3–6	Lance Lynn (6–1)	**Scott Rice** (1–3)	Edward Mujica (10)	Busch Stadium (38,412)	14–21
36	May 14	@Cardinals	4–10	John Gast (1–0)	**Dillon Gee** (2–5)		Busch Stadium (37,460)	14–22
37	May 15	@Cardinals	2–4	Seth Maness (3–0)	**Shaun Marcum** (0–4)	Edward Mujica (11)	Busch Stadium (38,143)	14–23
38	May 16	@Cardinals	5–2	**Jon Niese** (3–4)	Adam Wainwright (5–3)	**Bobby Parnell** (4)	Busch Stadium (44,068)	15–23
39	May 17	@Cubs	3–2	**Matt Harvey** (5–0)	Edwin Jackson (1–6)	**Bobby Parnell** (5)	Wrigley Field (34,890)	16–23
40	May 18	@Cubs	2–8	Scott Feldman (4–3)	**Jeremy Hefner** (0–5)		Wrigley Field (38,766)	16–24
41	May 19	@Cubs	4–3	**Scott Rice** (2–3)	Kyuji Fujikawa (1–1)	**Bobby Parnell** (6)	Wrigley Field (34,258)	17–24
42	May 20	Reds	3–4	Johnny Cueto (2–0)	**Shaun Marcum** (0–5)	Aroldis Chapman (9)	Citi Field (23,038)	17–25
43	May 21	Reds	0–4	Mike Leake (4–2)	**Jon Niese** (3–5)		Citi Field (23,183)	17–26
44	May 22	Reds	4–7	Alfredo Simón (4–1)	**Bobby Parnell** (4–1)	Aroldis Chapman (10)	Citi Field (30,415)	17–27
45	May 24	Braves	5–7 (10)	Anthony Varvaro (2–0)	**Brandon Lyon** (1–2)	Craig Kimbrel (15)	Citi Field (32,325)	17–28
46	May 25	Braves	0–6	Mike Minor (6–2)	**Dillon Gee** (2–6)		Citi Field (27,622)	17–29
47	May 26	Braves	4–2	**LaTroy Hawkins** (1–0)	Cory Gearrin (1–1)	**Bobby Parnell** (7)	Citi Field (27,296)	18–29
48	May 27	Yankees	2–1	**Brandon Lyon** (2–2)	David Robertson (3–1)	**Bobby Parnell** (8)	Citi Field (32,911)	19–29
49	May 28	Yankees	2–1	**Scott Rice** (3–3)	Mariano Rivera (0–1)		Citi Field (31,877)	20–29
50	May 29	@Yankees	9–4	**Jeremy Hefner** (1–5)	David Phelps (3–3)		Yankee Stadium (43,681)	21–29
51	May 30	@Yankees	3–1	**Dillon Gee** (3–6)	Vidal Nuño (1–2)	**Bobby Parnell** (9)	Yankee Stadium (44,207)	22–29
52	May 31	@Marlins	1–5	Jacob Turner (1–0)	**Shaun Marcum** (0–6)		Marlins Park (16,493)	22–30

June: 11–15 (Home: 3–8; Away: 8–7)

#	Date	Opponent	Score	Win	Loss	Save	Location (Attendance)	Record
53	June 1	@Marlins	1–8	José Fernández (3–3)	**Collin McHugh** (0–1)		Marlins Park (16,283)	22–31
54	June 2	@Marlins	6–11	Wade LeBlanc (1–5)	**Scott Rice** (3–4)		Marlins Park (18,434)	22–32
55	June 4	@Nationals	2–3	Tyler Clippard (4–1)	**Bobby Parnell** (4–2)		Nationals Park (31,473)	22–33
56	June 5	@Nationals	10–1	**Dillon Gee** (4–6)	Dan Haren (4–7)		Nationals Park (36,155)	23–33
	June 6	@Nationals	Postponed (rain); Rescheduled as split doubleheader on July 26				Nationals Park	
	June 7	Marlins	Postponed (rain); Rescheduled as doubleheader on September 14				Citi Field	
57	June 8	Marlins	1–2 (20)	Kevin Slowey (2–5)	**Shaun Marcum** (0–7)	Steve Cishek (6)	Citi Field (20,338)	23–34
58	June 9	Marlins	4–8 (10)	Chad Qualls (1–0)	**Bobby Parnell** (4–3)		Citi Field (21,747)	23–35
59	June 11	Cardinals	2–9	Michael Wacha (1–0)	**Jeremy Hefner** (1–6)		Citi Field (21,581)	23–36
60	June 12	Cardinals	5–1	**Dillon Gee** (5–6)	Shelby Miller (7–4)		Citi Field (23,331)	24–36
61	June 13	Cardinals	1–2	Adam Wainwright (10–3)	**Matt Harvey** (5–1)	Edward Mujica (19)	Citi Field (25,471)	24–37
62	June 14	Cubs	3–6	Edwin Jackson (3–8)	**Shaun Marcum** (0–8)	Kevin Gregg (8)	Citi Field (32,208)	24–38
63	June 15	Cubs	2–5	Scott Feldman (6–5)	**Jon Niese** (3–6)	Kevin Gregg (9)	Citi Field (27,004)	24–39
64	June 16	Cubs	4–3	**Bobby Parnell** (5–3)	Carlos Mármol (2–4)		Citi Field (30,256)	25–39
65	June 17	@Braves	1–2	David Carpenter (1–0)	**Dillon Gee** (5–7)		Turner Field (22,048)	25–40
66	June 18	@Braves	4–3	**Matt Harvey** (6–1)	Alex Wood (0–1)	**Bobby Parnell** (10)	Turner Field (21,857)	26–40
67	June 18	@Braves	6–1	**Zack Wheeler** (1–0)	Paul Maholm (7–6)		Turner Field (21,073)	27–40
68	June 19	@Braves	3–5	Kris Medlen (4–7)	**Shaun Marcum** (0–9)	Craig Kimbrel (20)	Turner Field (21,852)	27–41
69	June 20	@Braves	4–3	**LaTroy Hawkins** (2–0)	Mike Minor (8–3)	**Bobby Parnell** (11)	Turner Field (33,824)	28–41
70	June 21	@Phillies	4–3	**Jeremy Hefner** (2–6)	Cole Hamels (2–11)	**Bobby Parnell** (12)	Citizens Bank Park (40,062)	29–41
71	June 22	@Phillies	7–8	Jonathan Papelbon (2–0)	**Carlos Torres** (0–1)		Citizens Bank Park (45,725)	29–42
72	June 23	@Phillies	8–0	**Matt Harvey** (7–1)	John Lannan (0–2)		Citizens Bank Park (44,951)	30–42
73	June 25	@White Sox	4–5	Addison Reed (3–0)	**LaTroy Hawkins** (2–1)		U.S. Cellular Field (20,789)	30–43
74	June 26	@White Sox	3–0	**Shaun Marcum** (1–9)	John Danks (1–5)	**Bobby Parnell** (13)	U.S. Cellular Field (18,249)	31–43
75	June 27	@Rockies	3–2	**LaTroy Hawkins** (3–1)	Matt Belisle (4–5)	**Bobby Parnell** (14)	Coors Field (34,387)	32–43
76	June 28	Nationals	4–6	Tyler Clippard (6–1)	**Bobby Parnell** (5–4)	Drew Storen (2)	Citi Field (28,363)	32–44
77	June 29	Nationals	5–1	**Dillon Gee** (6–7)	Taylor Jordan (0–1)		Citi Field (26,426)	33–44
78	June 30	Nationals	2–13	Gio González (5–3)	**Zack Wheeler** (1–1)		Citi Field (33,366)	33–45

July: 15–12 (Home: 6–5; Away: 9–7)

#	Date	Opponent	Score	Win	Loss	Save	Location (Attendance)	Record
79	July 1	Diamondbacks	5–4 (13)	**David Aardsma** (1–0)	Josh Collmenter (4–1)		Citi Field (22,240)	34–45
80	July 2	Diamondbacks	9–1	**Jeremy Hefner** (3–6)	Patrick Corbin (9–1)		Citi Field (21,500)	35–45
81	July 3	Diamondbacks	3–5	Randall Delgado (1–2)	**Matt Harvey** (7–2)	Heath Bell (15)	Citi Field (41,257)	35–46
82	July 4	Diamondbacks	4–5 (15)	Chaz Roe (1–0)	**Scott Rice** (3–5)	Brad Ziegler (1)	Citi Field (24,224)	35–47
83	July 5	@Brewers	12–5	**Zack Wheeler** (2–1)	Johnny Hellweg (0–2)	**Josh Edgin** (1)	Miller Park (32,519)	36–47
84	July 6	@Brewers	6–7	Yovani Gallardo (7–8)	**Shaun Marcum** (1–10)	Francisco Rodriguez (8)	Miller Park (31,619)	36–48
85	July 7	@Brewers	2–1	**Jeremy Hefner** (4–6)	Tom Gorzelanny (1–2)	**Bobby Parnell** (15)	Miller Park (39,677)	37–48
86	July 8	@Giants	4–3 (16)	**Josh Edgin** (1–1)	George Kontos (2–2)	**Bobby Parnell** (16)	AT&T Park (41,497)	38–48
87	July 9	@Giants	10–6	**Scott Rice** (4–5)	José Mijares (0–2)		AT&T Park (41,534)	39–48
88	July 10	@Giants	7–2	**Zack Wheeler** (3–1)	Matt Cain (5–6)		AT&T Park (41,679)	40–48
89	July 12	@Pirates	2–3 (11)	Vin Mazzaro (5–2)	**Gonzalez Germen** (0–1)		PNC Park (39,036)	40–49
90	July 13	@Pirates	2–4	Justin Wilson (6–1)	**Greg Burke** (0–2)	Jason Grilli (29)	PNC Park (39,173)	40–50
91	July 14	@Pirates	4–2	**Dillon Gee** (7–7)	Gerrit Cole (4–3)	**Bobby Parnell** (17)	PNC Park (37,490)	41–50
	July 16	A.L. @ N.L.	0–3	2013 Major League Baseball All-Star Game			Citi Field (45,186)	
92	July 19	Phillies	8–13	Kyle Kendrick (9–6)	**Jeremy Hefner** (4–7)		Citi Field (35,021)	41–51
93	July 20	Phillies	5–4	**Gonzalez Germen** (1–1)	Cole Hamels (4–12)	**Bobby Parnell** (18)	Citi Field (26,722)	42–51
94	July 21	Phillies	5–0	**Matt Harvey** (8–2)	Cliff Lee (10–4)		Citi Field (32,127)	43–51
95	July 22	Braves	1–2	Jordan Walden (4–1)	**Bobby Parnell** (5–5)	Craig Kimbrel (28)	Citi Field (25,111)	43–52
96	July 23	Braves	4–1	**Carlos Torres** (1–1)	Kris Medlen (6–10)	**Bobby Parnell** (19)	Citi Field (24,355)	44–52
97	July 24	Braves	2–8	Tim Hudson (8–7)	**Jeremy Hefner** (4–8)		Citi Field (28,194)	44–53
98	July 25	Braves	7–4	**Zack Wheeler** (4–1)	Kameron Loe (1–2)	**Bobby Parnell** (20)	Citi Field (35,793)	45–53
99	July 26	@Nationals	11–0	**Jenrry Mejía** (1–0)	Jordan Zimmermann (12–6)		Nationals Park (33,858)	46–53
100	July 26	@Nationals	1–2	Rafael Soriano (2–2)	**LaTroy Hawkins** (3–2)		Nationals Park (33,689)	46–54
101	July 27	@Nationals	1–4	Dan Haren (5–11)	**Dillon Gee** (7–8)	Rafael Soriano (26)	Nationals Park (37,464)	46–55
102	July 28	@Nationals	1–14	Taylor Jordan (1–3)	**Carlos Torres** (1–2)		Nationals Park (31,467)	46–56
103	July 29	@Marlins	6–5	**David Aardsma** (2–0)	A.J. Ramos (3–4)	**Bobby Parnell** (21)	Marlins Park (19,343)	47–56
104	July 30	@Marlins	4–2 (10)	**Scott Atchison** (1–0)	Steve Cishek (3–6)	**Bobby Parnell** (22)	Marlins Park (23,408)	48–56
105	July 31	@Marlins	2–3	Henderson Álvarez (2–1)	**Jenrry Mejía** (1–1)	Mike Dunn (2)	Marlins Park (18,714)	48–57

August: 14–15 (Home: 7–8; Away: 7–7)

#	Date	Opponent	Score	Win	Loss	Save	Location (Attendance)	Record
106	August 1	@Marlins	0–3	Tom Koehler (3–6)	**Matt Harvey** (8–3)	Steve Cishek (23)	Marlins Park (25,916)	48–58
107	August 2	Royals	4–2 (11)	**Carlos Torres** (2–2)	Luis Mendoza (2–6)		Citi Field (31,032)	49–58
108	August 3	Royals	3–4 (12)	Kelvin Herrera (4–5)	**David Aardsma** (2–1)	Greg Holland (29)	Citi Field (25,095)	49–59
109	August 4	Royals	2–6	Ervin Santana (8–6)	**Zack Wheeler** (4–2)		Citi Field (25,658)	49–60
110	August 6	Rockies	3–2	**Scott Atchison** (2–0)	Wilton López (1–4)	**LaTroy Hawkins** (1)	Citi Field (27,198)	50–60
111	August 7	Rockies	5–0	**Matt Harvey** (9–3)	Jhoulys Chacín (10–6)		Citi Field (27,581)	51–60
112	August 8	Rockies	2–1	**Dillon Gee** (8–8)	Jeff Manship (0–1)	**LaTroy Hawkins** (2)	Citi Field (26,618)	52–60
113	August 9	@Diamondbacks	4–5	Brad Ziegler (5–1)	**Scott Atchison** (2–1)		Chase Field (25,187)	52–61
114	August 10	@Diamondbacks	4–1	**Zack Wheeler** (5–2)	Brandon McCarthy (2–6)	**LaTroy Hawkins** (3)	Chase Field (42,450)	53–61
115	August 11	@Diamondbacks	9–5	**Jon Niese** (4–6)	Zeke Spruill (0–2)		Chase Field (28,260)	54–61
116	August 12	@Dodgers	2–4	Ricky Nolasco (9–9)	**Jenrry Mejía** (1–2)	Kenley Jansen (18)	Dodger Stadium (42,915)	54–62
117	August 13	@Dodgers	2–4	Hyun-Jin Ryu (12–3)	**Matt Harvey** (9–4)	Kenley Jansen (19)	Dodger Stadium (46,335)	54–63
118	August 14	@Dodgers	4–5 (12)	Paco Rodriguez (3–2)	**Pedro Feliciano** (0–1)		Dodger Stadium (44,091)	54–64
119	August 15	@Padres	4–1	**Scott Atchison** (3–1)	Luke Gregerson (5–7)	**González Germen** (1)	Petco Park (21,400)	55–64
120	August 16	@Padres	5–2	**Jon Niese** (5–6)	Ian Kennedy (4–9)	**LaTroy Hawkins** (4)	Petco Park (25,604)	56–64
121	August 17	@Padres	2–8	Edinson Vólquez (9–10)	**David Aardsma** (2–2)		Petco Park (36,974)	56–65
122	August 18	@Padres	3–4	Huston Street (1–4)	**Pedro Feliciano** (0–2)		Petco Park (24,704)	56–66
123	August 19	@Twins	6–1	**Dillon Gee** (9–8)	Kyle Gibson (2–4)		Target Field (30,913)	57–66
124	August 20	Braves	5–3	**Zack Wheeler** (6–2)	Brandon Beachy (2–1)	**LaTroy Hawkins** (5)	Citi Field (25,863)	58–66
125	August 21	Braves	1–4 (10)	Luis Avilán (5–0)	**Scott Atchison** (3–2)	Craig Kimbrel (40)	Citi Field (22,935)	58–67
126	August 23	Tigers	1–6	Doug Fister (11–6)	**Daisuke Matsuzaka** (0–1)		Citi Field (37,023)	58–68
127	August 24	Tigers	0–3	Max Scherzer (19–1)	**Matt Harvey** (9–5)	Joaquín Benoit (17)	Citi Field (35,636)	58–69
128	August 25	Tigers	3–11	Rick Porcello (10–7)	**Dillon Gee** (9–9)		Citi Field (32,084)	58–70
129	August 26	Phillies	1–2	Cliff Lee (11–6)	**Zack Wheeler** (6–3)	Jonathan Papelbon (22)	Citi Field (25,784)	58–71
130	August 27	Phillies	5–0	**Jon Niese** (6–6)	Kyle Kendrick (10–11)		Citi Field (25,700)	59–71
131	August 28	Phillies	2–6	Cole Hamels (6–13)	**Daisuke Matsuzaka** (0–2)		Citi Field (24,447)	59–72
132	August 29	Phillies	11–3	**Carlos Torres** (3–1)	Ethan Martin (2–3)		Citi Field (22,008)	60–72
133	August 30	@Nationals	3–2	**Dillon Gee** (10–9)	Jordan Zimmerman (15–8)	**LaTroy Hawkins** (6)	Nationals Park (35,008)	61–72
134	August 31	@Nationals	11–3	**Zack Wheeler** (7–3)	Dan Haren (8–12)		Nationals Park (34,481)	62–72

September: 12–16 (Home: 5–10; Away: 7–6)

#	Date	Opponent	Score	Win	Loss	Save	Location (Attendance)	Record
135	September 1	@Nationals	5–6	Erik Davis (1–0)	**González Germen** (1–2)	Rafael Soriano (36)	Nationals Park (28,995)	62–73
136	September 2	@Braves	5–13	Paul Maholm (10–10)	**Daisuke Matsuzaka** (0–3)		Turner Field (26,530)	62–74
137	September 3	@Braves	1–3	Kris Medlen (12–12)	**Carlos Torres** (3–3)	Craig Kimbrel (44)	Turner Field (21,221)	62–75
138	September 4	@Braves	5–2	**Dillon Gee** (11–9)	Kameron Loe (1–3)	**LaTroy Hawkins** (7)	Turner Field (22,946)	63–75
139	September 6	@Indians	1–8	Scott Kazmir (8–7)	**Zack Wheeler** (7–4)		Progressive Field (15,962)	63–76
140	September 7	@Indians	4–9	Corey Kluber (8–5)	**Jon Niese** (6–7)		Progressive Field (21,453)	63–77
141	September 8	@Indians	2–1	**Frank Francisco** (1–0)	Chris Perez (5–3)	**LaTroy Hawkins** (8)	Progressive Field (13,317)	64–77
142	September 9	Nationals	0–9	Gio González (10–6)	**Carlos Torres** (3–4)		Citi Field (20,174)	64–78
143	September 10	Nationals	3–6	Jordan Zimmerman (17–8)	**Dillon Gee** (11–10)	Rafael Soriano (40)	Citi Field (20,307)	64–79
144	September 11	Nationals	0–3	Dan Haren (9–13)	**Zack Wheeler** (7–5)	Rafael Soriano (41)	Citi Field (20,151)	64–80
145	September 12	Nationals	2–7	Tanner Roark (6–0)	**Aaron Harang** (0–1)		Citi Field (20,484)	64–81
146	September 13	Marlins	4–3	**Jon Niese** (7–7)	Brad Hand (0–1)	**LaTroy Hawkins** (9)	Citi Field (20,562)	65–81
147	September 14	Marlins	0–3	Henderson Álvarez (4–4)	**Carlos Torres** (3–5)	Steve Cishek (30)	Citi Field	65–82
148	September 14	Marlins	3–1	**Daisuke Matsuzaka** (1–3)	Jacob Turner (3–7)	**LaTroy Hawkins** (10)	Citi Field (25,175)	66–82
149	September 15	Marlins	1–0 (12)	**Vic Black** (1–0)	Zach Phillips (0–1)		Citi Field (25,165)	67–82
150	September 17	Giants	5–8	Yusmeiro Petit (4–0)	**Sean Henn** (0–1)		Citi Field (24,343)	67–83
151	September 18	Giants	5–4	**Vic Black** (2–0)	Sergio Romo (4–8)		Citi Field (23,698)	68–83
152	September 19	Giants	1–2	Madison Bumgarner (13–9)	**Jon Niese** (7–8)	Javier López (1)	Citi Field (22,897)	68–84
153	September 20	@Phillies	6–4	**Daisuke Matsuzaka** (2–3)	Cole Hamels (8–14)	**LaTroy Hawkins** (11)	Citizens Bank Park (33,117)	69–84
154	September 21	@Phillies	5–4 (7)	**Dillon Gee** (12–10)	Tyler Cloyd (2–6)		Citizens Bank Park (36,650)	70–84
155	September 22	@Phillies	4–3	**Carlos Torres** (4–5)	Cliff Lee (14–7)	**LaTroy Hawkins** (12)	Citizens Bank Park (44,398)	71–84
156	September 23	@Reds	2–3 (10)	Manny Parra (2–3)	**Greg Burke** (0–3)		Great American Ball Park (21,269)	71–85
157	September 24	@Reds	4–2	**Jon Niese** (8–8)	Mike Leake (14–7)	**Vic Black** (1)	Great American Ball Park (28,887)	72–85
158	September 25	@Reds	1–0	**Daisuke Matsuzaka** (3–3)	Mat Latos (14–7)	**LaTroy Hawkins** (13)	Great American Ball Park (26,223)	73–85
159	September 26	Brewers	2–4	Alfredo Figaro (3–3)	**Dillon Gee** (12–11)	Jim Henderson (27)	Citi Field (21,350)	73–86
160	September 27	Brewers	2–4	Yovani Gallardo (12–10)	**Carlos Torres** (4–6)	Jim Henderson (28)	Citi Field (25,276)	73–87
161	September 28	Brewers	2–4 (10)	Donovan Hand (1–5)	**Scott Atchison** (3–3)	Alfredo Figaro (1)	Citi Field (29,326)	73–88
162	September 29	Brewers	3–2	**Vic Black** (3–0)	Brandon Kintzler (3–3)	**Frank Francisco** (1)	Citi Field (41,891)	74–88

=== Roster ===
2013 New York Mets
**Roster**
**Pitchers**: 30 David Aardsma; 50 Scott Atchison; 38 Vic Black; 46 Greg Burke; 40 Tim Byrdak; 73 Robert Carson; 66 Josh Edgin; 27 Jeurys Familia; 55 Pedro Feliciano; 48 Frank Francisco; 35 Dillon Gee; 71 Gonzalez Germen; 44 Aaron Harang; 33 Matt Harvey; 32 LaTroy Hawkins; 53 Jeremy Hefner; 43 Sean Henn; 47 Aaron Laffey; 34 Brandon Lyon; 38 Shaun Marcum; 16 Daisuke Matsuzaka; 36 Collin McHugh; 58 Jenrry Mejía; 49 Jon Niese; 39 Bobby Parnell; 56 Scott Rice; 52 Carlos Torres; 45 Zack Wheeler	**Catchers**: 44 John Buck; 36 Juan Centeno; 15 Travis d'Arnaud; 20 Anthony Recker; **Infielders**: 29 Ike Davis; 4 Wilmer Flores; 19 Zach Lutz; 28 Daniel Murphy; 3 Omar Quintanilla; 13 Josh Satin; 11 Rubén Tejada; 70 Wilfredo Tovar; 2 Justin Turner; 5 David Wright; **Outfielders**: 16 Rick Ankiel; 23 Mike Baxter; 47 Andrew Brown; 6 Marlon Byrd; 4 Collin Cowgill; 6 Matt den Dekker; 21 Lucas Duda; 12 Juan Lagares; 9 Kirk Nieuwenhuis; 1 Jordany Valdespin; 22 Eric Young, Jr.	**Manager**: 10 Terry Collins; **Coaches**: 25 Ricky Bones (bullpen); 7 Bob Geren (bench); 26 Tom Goodwin (first base); 51 Dave Hudgens (hitting); 78 Eric Langill (bullpen catcher); 54 Dave Racaniello (bullpen catcher); 18 Tim Teufel (third base); 59 Dan Warthen (pitching)

== Player stats ==
=== Batting ===
Note: G = Games played; AB = At bats; R = Runs; H = Hits; 2B = Doubles; 3B = Triples; HR = Home runs; RBI = Runs batted in; SB = Stolen bases; BB = Walks; AVG = Batting average; SLG = Slugging average

Player	G	AB	R	H	2B	3B	HR	RBI	SB	BB	AVG	SLG
Daniel Murphy	161	658	92	188	38	4	13	78	23	32	.286	.415
David Wright	112	430	63	132	23	6	18	58	17	55	.307	.514
Marlon Byrd	117	425	61	121	26	5	21	71	2	25	.285	.518
Juan Lagares	121	392	35	95	21	5	4	34	6	20	.242	.352
Eric Young Jr.	91	374	48	94	18	4	1	26	38	35	.251	.329
John Buck	101	368	38	79	11	0	15	60	2	29	.215	.367
Lucas Duda	100	318	42	71	16	0	15	33	0	55	.223	.415
Ike Davis	103	317	37	65	14	0	9	33	4	57	.205	.334
Omar Quintanilla	95	315	28	70	9	2	2	21	2	38	.222	.283
Rubén Tejada	57	208	20	42	12	0	0	10	2	15	.202	.260
Justin Turner	86	200	12	56	13	1	2	16	0	11	.280	.385
Josh Satin	75	190	23	53	15	0	3	17	1	30	.279	.405
Andrew Brown	68	150	16	34	5	0	7	24	1	13	.227	.400
Anthony Recker	50	135	17	29	7	0	6	19	0	13	.215	.400
Jordany Valdespin	66	133	16	25	3	1	4	16	4	8	.188	.316
Mike Baxter	74	132	14	25	6	1	0	4	5	17	.189	.250
Travis d'Arnaud	31	99	4	20	3	0	1	5	0	12	.202	.263
Kirk Nieuwenhuis	47	95	10	18	3	1	3	14	2	12	.189	.337
Wilmer Flores	27	95	8	20	5	0	1	13	0	5	.211	.295
Rick Ankiel	20	66	7	12	4	1	2	7	0	5	.182	.364
Collin Cowgill	23	61	7	11	2	0	2	8	0	2	.180	.311
Matt den Dekker	27	58	7	12	1	0	1	6	4	4	.207	.276
Zach Lutz	15	20	2	6	2	0	0	2	0	6	.300	.400
Wilfredo Tovar	7	15	1	3	0	0	0	2	1	1	.200	.200
Juan Centeno	4	10	0	3	0	0	0	1	0	0	.300	.300
Pitcher totals	162	295	11	34	6	1	0	15	0	12	.115	.142
Team totals	162	5559	619	1318	263	32	130	593	114	512	.237	.366

=== Pitching ===
Note: W = Wins; L = Losses; ERA = Earned run average; G = Games pitched; GS = Games started; SV = Saves; IP = Innings pitched; H = Hits allowed; R = Runs allowed; ER = Earned runs allowed; BB = Walks allowed; SO = Strikeouts

Player	W	L	ERA	G	GS	SV	IP	H	R	ER	BB	SO
Dillon Gee	12	11	3.62	32	32	0	199.0	208	84	80	47	142
Matt Harvey	9	5	2.27	26	26	0	178.1	135	46	45	31	191
Jon Niese	8	8	3.71	24	24	0	143.0	158	68	59	48	105
Jeremy Hefner	4	8	4.34	24	23	0	130.2	132	75	63	37	99
Zach Wheeler	7	5	3.42	17	17	0	100.0	90	42	38	46	84
Carlos Torres	4	6	3.44	33	9	0	86.1	79	34	33	17	75
Shaun Marcum	1	10	5.29	14	12	0	78.1	85	48	46	21	60
LaTroy Hawkins	3	2	2.93	72	0	13	70.2	71	27	23	10	55
Scott Rice	4	5	3.71	73	0	0	51.0	42	22	21	27	41
Bobby Parnell	5	5	2.16	49	0	22	50.0	38	17	12	12	44
Scott Atchison	3	3	4.37	50	0	0	45.1	45	27	22	12	28
David Aardsma	2	2	4.31	43	0	0	39.2	39	20	19	19	36
Daisuke Matsuzaka	3	3	4.42	7	7	0	38.2	32	21	19	16	33
Brandon Lyon	2	2	4.98	37	0	0	34.1	43	20	19	13	23
Gonzalez Germen	1	2	3.93	29	0	1	34.1	32	15	15	16	33
Greg Burke	0	3	5.68	32	0	0	31.2	43	27	20	15	28
Josh Edgin	1	1	3.77	34	0	1	28.2	26	12	12	12	20
Jenrry Mejía	1	2	2.30	5	5	0	27.1	28	9	7	4	27
Aaron Harang	0	1	3.52	4	4	0	23.0	20	10	9	12	26
Robert Carson	0	0	8.24	14	0	0	19.2	21	19	18	7	8
Vic Black	3	0	3.46	15	0	1	13.0	11	5	5	4	12
Pedro Feliciano	0	2	3.97	25	0	0	11.1	11	5	5	6	9
Jeurys Familia	0	0	4.22	9	0	1	10.2	12	5	5	9	8
Aaron Laffey	0	0	7.20	4	2	0	10.0	16	8	8	5	9
Collin McHugh	0	1	10.29	3	1	0	7.0	12	8	8	3	3
Frank Francisco	1	0	4.26	8	0	1	6.1	4	3	3	3	6
Tim Byrdak	0	0	7.71	8	0	0	4.2	5	4	4	2	3
Sean Henn	0	1	3.38	4	0	0	2.2	3	1	1	3	1
Anthony Recker	0	0	18.00	1	0	0	1.0	1	2	2	1	0
Team totals	74	88	3.77	162	162	40	1476.2	1442	684	618	458	1209

== Awards and honors ==
All-Star Game

- David Wright, 3B, Starter
- Matt Harvey, Pitcher, Reserve

== Farm system ==
Level	Team	League	Manager
AAA	Las Vegas 51s	Pacific Coast League	Wally Backman
AA	Binghamton Mets	Eastern League	Pedro López
A	St. Lucie Mets	Florida State League	Ryan Ellis
A	Savannah Sand Gnats	South Atlantic League	Luis Rojas
A-Short Season	Brooklyn Cyclones	New York–Penn League	Rich Donnelly
Rookie	Kingsport Mets	Appalachian League	José Leger
Rookie	GCL Mets	Gulf Coast League	José Carreño

LEAGUE CHAMPIONS: Savannah
