= Scott Rice =

American baseball player (born 1981)

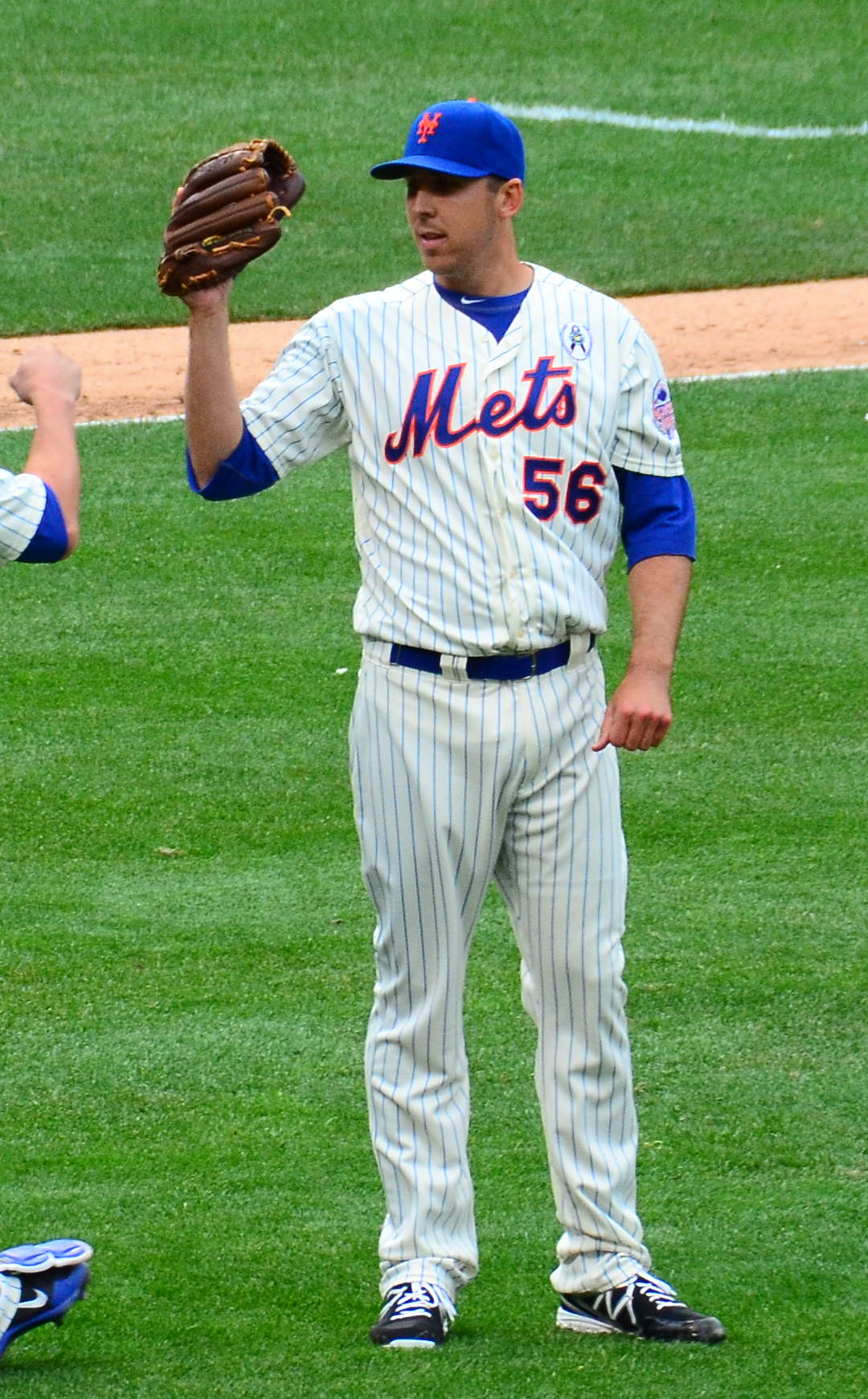
- Rice with the New York Mets
- Pitcher
- Born: September 21, 1981 (age 45); Simi Valley, California, U.S.
- Batted: Left Threw: Left

MLB debut
- April 1, 2013, for the New York Mets

Last MLB appearance
- June 8, 2014, for the New York Mets

MLB statistics
- Win–loss record: 5–7
- Earned run average: 4.18
- Strikeouts: 54
- Stats at Baseball Reference

Teams
- New York Mets (2013–2014)

Scott Adam Rice (born September 21, 1981) is an American former professional baseball pitcher. A first-round draft pick in the 1999 MLB draft, his career was slowed by injuries. He pitched in minor league baseball for 14 seasons before his first promotion to Major League Baseball (MLB) in 2013, with the New York Mets.

== Career ==
Rice attended Royal High School in Simi Valley, California. He played for the high school baseball team as a pitcher. The Baltimore Orioles drafted Rice in the first round, with the 44th overall selection, of the 1999 Major League Baseball draft. He played in minor league baseball for the Orioles organization through 2005, reaching Double-A, then signed with the Texas Rangers in 2006, reaching Triple-A. He made only eight appearances in 2007 due to injury, and had surgery on his flexor tendon in 2008.

Rice returned to baseball pitching in independent leagues, playing for the Long Island Ducks in 2008 and the Newark Bears in 2009. He then pitched in the Colorado Rockies organization in 2010.

On November 24, 2010, Rice signed a minor league contract with the Chicago Cubs organization. He appeared in spring training for the team in 2011, but was later released prior to the start of the regular season.

Rice joined the York Revolution of the Atlantic League in 2011. During the season, the Los Angeles Dodgers signed Rice and assigned him to their Double-A affiliate. On December 14, 2011, the Dodgers re-signed Rice to a minor league contract that included an invitation to spring training, but he did not make the team, and was instead assigned to pitch for the Albuquerque Isotopes of the Triple-A Pacific Coast League (PCL).

=== New York Mets ===
On November 20, 2012, Rice signed a minor league contract with the New York Mets organization. Invited to spring training by the Mets in 2013, Rice made the team's Opening Day roster, the first time he was named to an MLB roster after 480 appearances in 14 minor league seasons. He made his MLB debut on April 1, 2013, striking out Nick Hundley and Cameron Maybin and retiring Will Venable on a ground out in one inning of work. Rice made 73 appearances, and recorded a 3.71 earned run average (ERA).

After struggling through the start of 2014 season, pitching to a 5.93 ERA and 1.98 walks plus hits per inning pitched in 32 appearances, the Mets demoted Rice to the Las Vegas 51s of the PCL on June 23. He underwent elbow surgery in July to remove a bone spur. On October 31, Rice was removed from the 40-man roster and sent outright to Las Vegas. He subsequently rejected the assignment and elected free agency.

Rice re-signed with the Mets on a minor league contract that included an invitation to spring training in December.

=== Arizona Diamondbacks ===
Rice signed a minor league contract with the Arizona Diamondbacks in December 2015. He was released on May 9, 2016.

=== York Revolution (second stint) ===
Rice resigned with the York Revolution of the Atlantic League of Professional Baseball. This marked Rice's return to York for the first time since 2011. He became a free agent after the 2016 season.
