= Marlon Byrd =

American baseball player (born 1977)

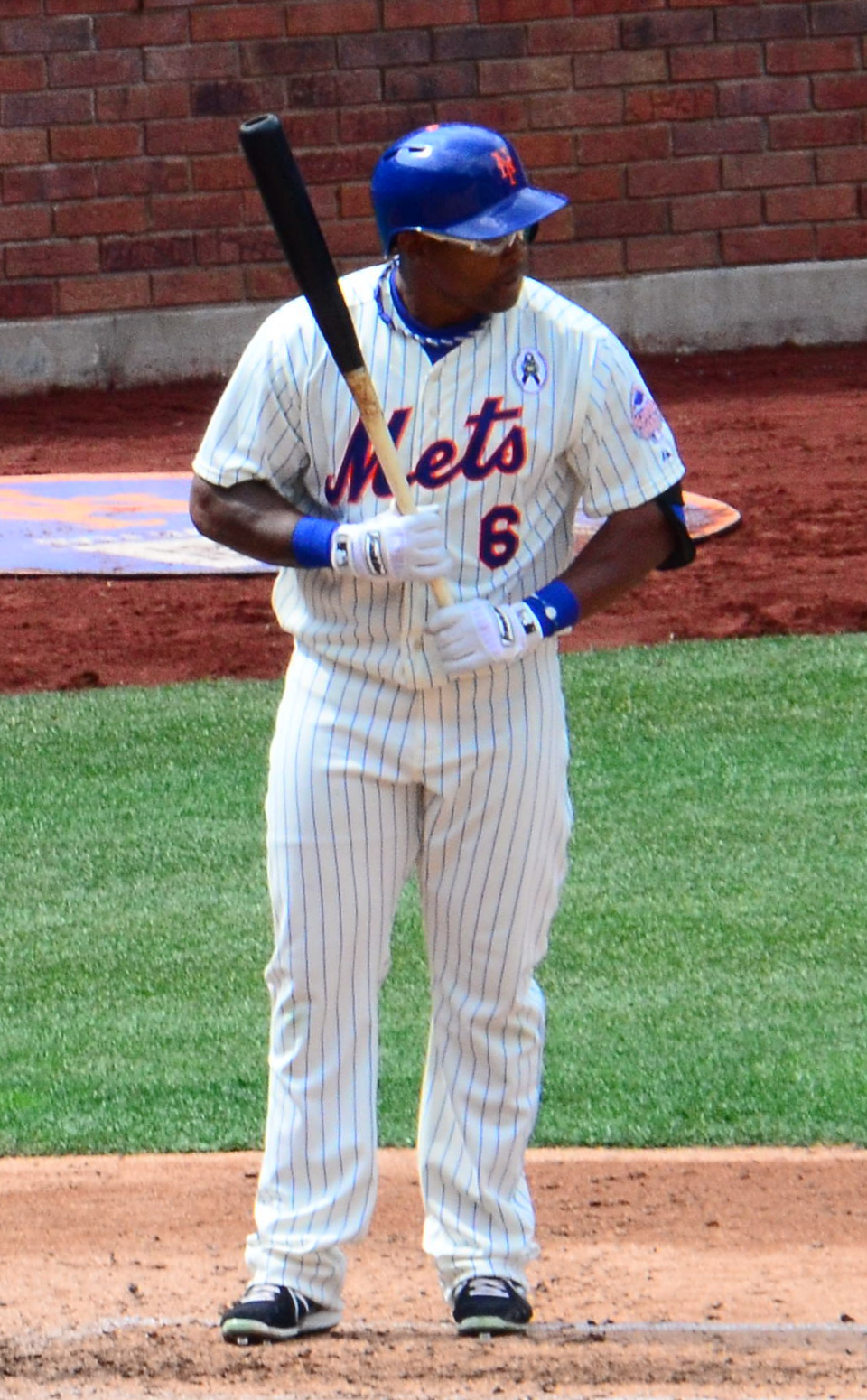
- Byrd with the Mets in 2013
- Outfielder
- Born: August 30, 1977 (age 49); Boynton Beach, Florida, U.S.
- Batted: Right Threw: Right

MLB debut
- September 8, 2002, for the Philadelphia Phillies

Last MLB appearance
- May 31, 2016, for the Cleveland Indians

MLB statistics
- Batting average: .275
- Home runs: 159
- Runs batted in: 710
- Stats at Baseball Reference

Teams
- Philadelphia Phillies (2002–2005); Washington Nationals (2005–2006); Texas Rangers (2007–2009); Chicago Cubs (2010–2012); Boston Red Sox (2012); New York Mets (2013); Pittsburgh Pirates (2013); Philadelphia Phillies (2014); Cincinnati Reds (2015); San Francisco Giants (2015); Cleveland Indians (2016)

Career highlights and awards
- All-Star (2010)

Marlon Jerrard Byrd (born August 30, 1977) is an American former professional baseball outfielder, who played in Major League Baseball (MLB) for the Philadelphia Phillies, Washington Nationals, Texas Rangers, Chicago Cubs, Boston Red Sox, New York Mets, Pittsburgh Pirates, San Francisco Giants, Cincinnati Reds, and Cleveland Indians. He was an All-Star in 2010 with the Cubs.

== High school career ==
Byrd is a 1995 graduate of Sprayberry High School in Marietta, Georgia, and won All-State honors in baseball and football. He played on the 1993 state runner-up team as a sophomore, and was part of the 1995 state championship team.

== College career ==
Byrd began his college baseball career at Georgia Tech. As a sophomore in 1996, after experiencing discomfort in his leg, Byrd was diagnosed with an infection in his tibialis anterior muscle, the largest muscle in the lower leg. After considering amputation, doctors chose to perform surgery to remove the muscle entirely. Between Thanksgiving in 1996 and January 1997, Byrd underwent a total of three operations. He spent nearly two years rehabbing the injury, during which time his body weight rose from 225 to 315 pounds. He shed the weight by approximating a bodybuilder diet and then enrolled at Georgia Perimeter College where he played his final season of college baseball in 1999.

== Major league career ==
=== Philadelphia Phillies ===
Byrd reached the major leagues in 2003. He came in fourth in the Rookie of the Year voting, batting .303 with 86 runs scored, 28 doubles, four triples, seven home runs, and 11 stolen bases in 135 games and 495 at-bats.

During his rookie season, Byrd and the team were sued by a fan who suffered a concussion from a ball that Byrd threw into the stands as a souvenir after making the last out of an inning. Both he and the team were granted summary judgement in their favor by the trial court, but the plaintiff appealed. A three-judge panel of the Superior Court of Pennsylvania heard the case, and two of the judges affirmed the judgement, holding that while such gifts to the fans are not part of gameplay, they are a common enough aspect of baseball games today that the Baseball Rule, which limits teams' liability to spectators injured by foul balls, applied to Byrd's throw as well.

"I do not doubt that Marlon Byrd threw the ball that hit [a]ppellant without malicious intent," wrote the dissenting justice, John Bender. "[But] if a baseball player wants to go beyond the confines of the game and provide a gratuitous souvenir to a fan, he should be charged with the obligation of doing it in a reasonably safe and prudent manner. Here, there is certainly evidence from which a factfinder might conclude that the manner in which Byrd threw the ball into the stands was imprudent." Bender said a jury should have been allowed to decide that question.

=== Washington Nationals ===
Byrd was traded to the Washington Nationals in 2005 for Endy Chávez. On July 15, 2006, Byrd was designated for assignment and assigned to Washington's Triple-A affiliate, the New Orleans Zephyrs.

=== Texas Rangers ===
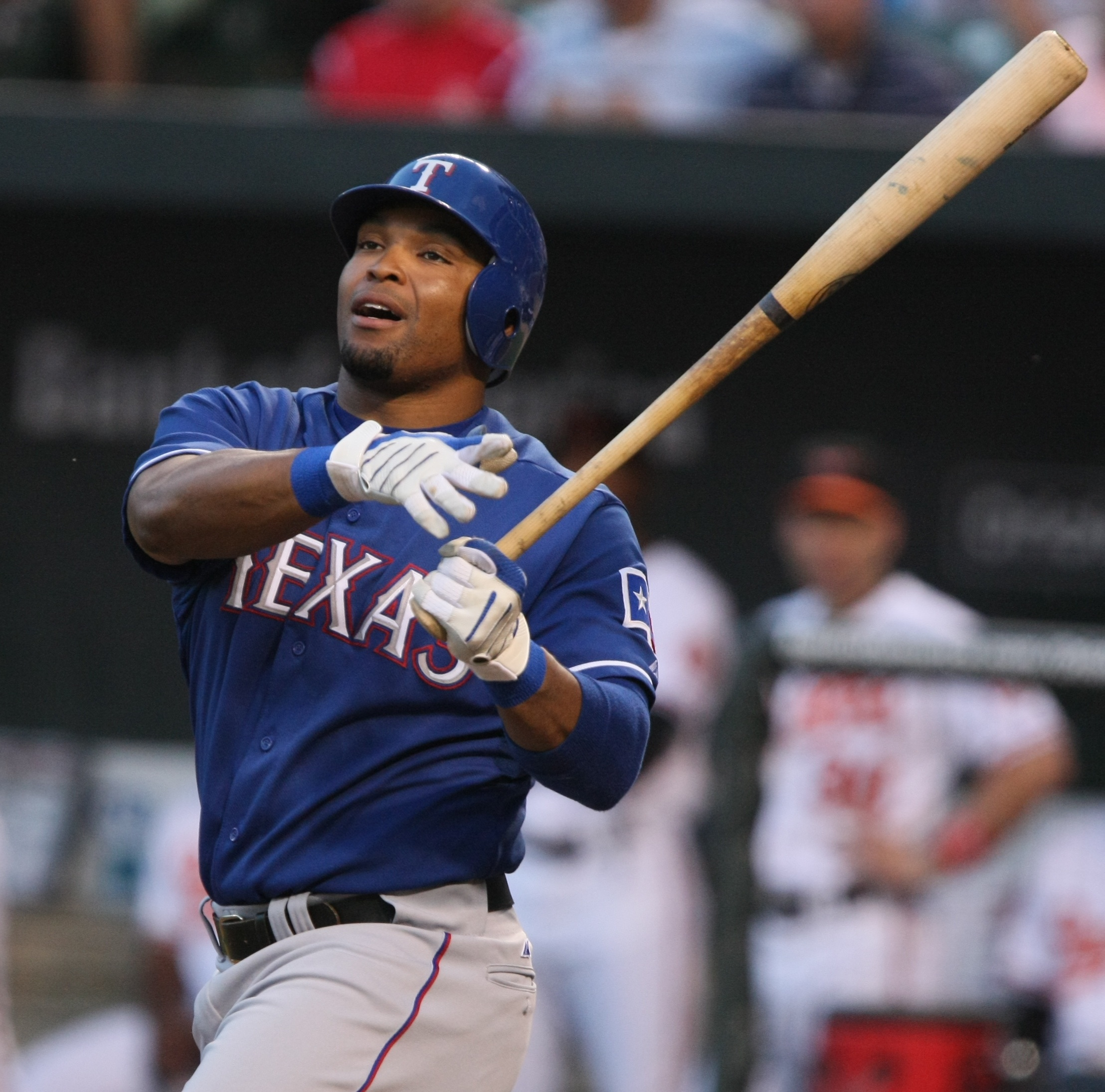
Byrd batting for the Texas Rangers in 2009

Byrd was signed as a free agent by the Rangers on December 8, 2006, to compete for the starting position in center field. After failing to make the Rangers' major league roster out of spring training, Byrd was assigned to the Triple-A Oklahoma RedHawks. Byrd's contract was purchased on May 26, 2007, following injuries to outfielders Brad Wilkerson and Jerry Hairston Jr. Making the most of his call-up by hitting over .400 for the month of June, Byrd played his way into the line-up, allowing the Rangers to trade center fielder Kenny Lofton prior to the trading deadline. On August 4, 2008, he hit a walk-off grand slam to help the Rangers beat the Yankees 9–5.

Byrd had a career season in 2009, hitting 20 home runs and collecting 89 RBIs.

Following the 2009 season, Byrd filed for free agency, declining the Rangers' offer of salary arbitration.

=== Chicago Cubs ===
On December 31, 2009, Byrd signed a three-year, $15 million contract with the Chicago Cubs. In his first season with the Cubs, Byrd had his best season. He was selected for his first All-Star Game. Byrd entered the game as a substitute and drew a walk off of Matt Thornton. He scored from first base on a double by Brian McCann. In the ninth inning, while playing right field, Byrd made an outstanding play, forcing Boston DH David Ortiz at second after fielding what normally would have been a base hit.

On May 21, 2011, while batting during the 2nd inning of a game against the Boston Red Sox at Fenway Park, Byrd was hit near his left eye by a pitch from Red Sox pitcher Alfredo Aceves. The pitch was, according to Aceves, unintentional. After the pitch hit him, Byrd dropped to the ground, covered the area by his left eye and rolled in pain; he was helped off the field by Cubs medical personnel and taken to the trainer's room in the clubhouse. Byrd did not return to the game. He was taken to Massachusetts Eye and Ear Infirmary at Massachusetts General Hospital in Boston, where he stayed overnight to be examined. The incident marked the fifth time that Byrd had been hit by a pitch in a ten-day period. Byrd was placed on the 15-day disabled list the following day. Justin Berg was called up to take his place. After a stint on the disabled list, Byrd wore a protective mask customized to his helmet to shield his weakened facial bones.

After the 2011 season, Byrd began practicing Muay Thai, started a new diet, and lost 40 lbs.

=== Later career ===
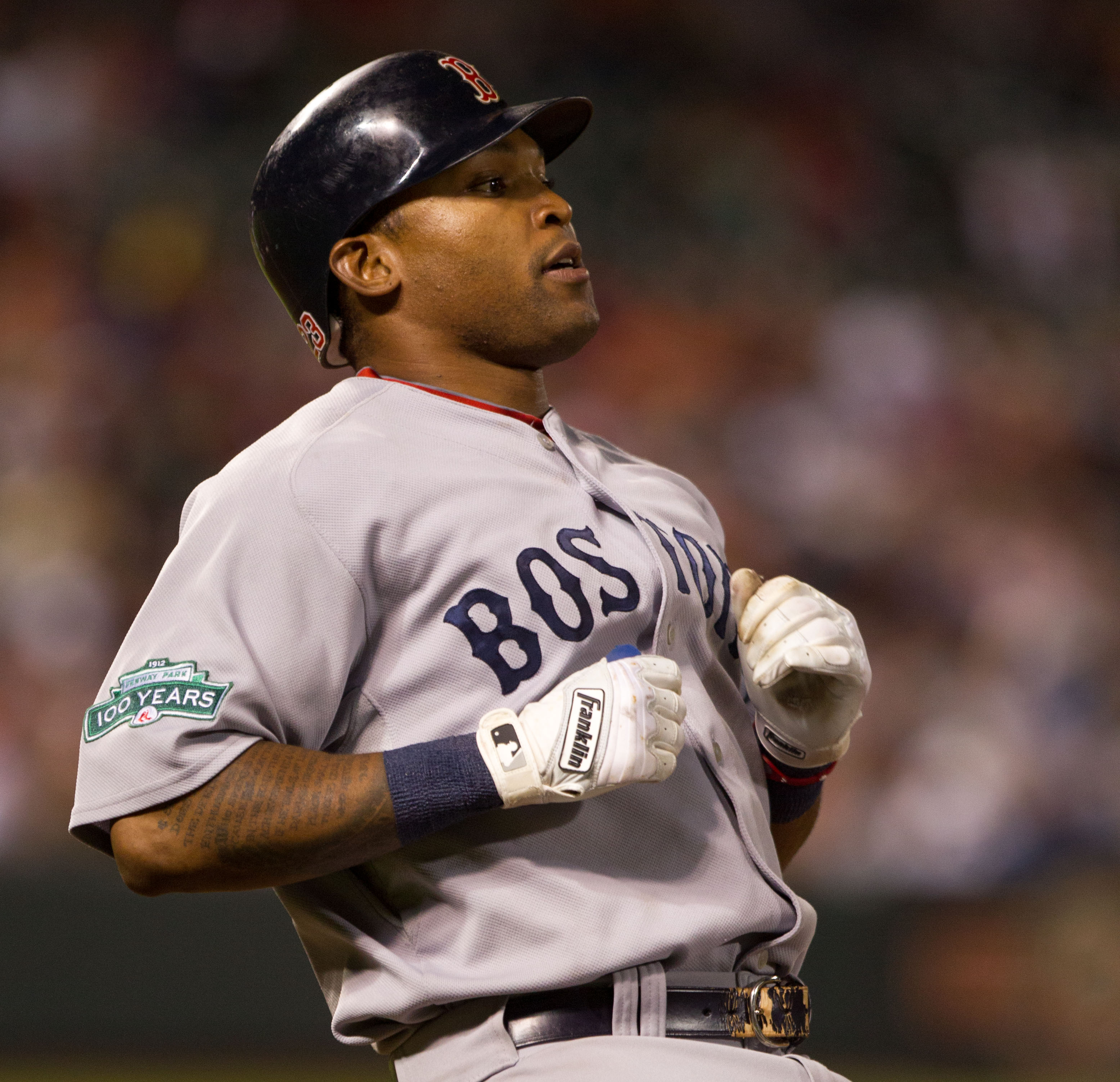
Byrd during his tenure with the Boston Red Sox in 2012

On April 21, 2012, Byrd was traded to the Boston Red Sox for Michael Bowden and a player to be named later. Minor league pitcher Hunter Cervenka was the player sent to the Cubs May 15. On June 9, Byrd was designated for assignment by the Red Sox in order to make room for Daisuke Matsuzaka, who was returning from the disabled list. On June 12, 2012, Byrd was released. On June 25, Byrd was suspended 50 games for testing positive for a banned substance. Byrd was placed on the restricted list and remained there until August 20.

On February 1, 2013, Byrd signed a minor-league deal with the Mets. Byrd hit a walk-off two-RBI single on April 7 for the Mets on their way to a 4–3 victory over the Miami Marlins. Before a game on June 5, 2013, Byrd joked with Mets teammate Anthony Recker that he was going to hit two home runs in the game. Byrd did hit two home runs in the Mets 10-1 win over the Washington Nationals. Byrd hit .285 with 21 home runs and 71 RBI in 117 games for the Mets before being traded to the Pittsburgh Pirates. On August 27, Byrd and John Buck were traded to the Pittsburgh Pirates in exchange for infield prospect Dilson Herrera and a player to be named later, identified on August 29 as Vic Black. In his first game with the Pirates, Byrd hit a 3-run home run in Pittsburgh's 7-1 victory over Milwaukee. In the 2013 National League Wild Card Game, Byrd went 2-4 with a home run and 2 RBI, as the Pirates defeated the Cincinnati Reds 6-2.

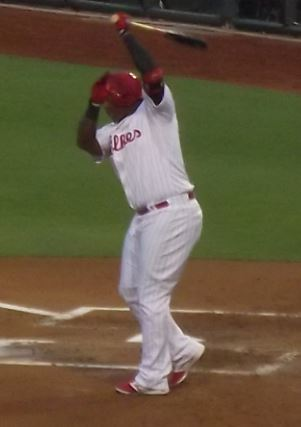
Byrd takes a practice swing in a 2014 game

On November 12, 2013, Byrd agreed in principle to a two-year contract worth $16 million to return to the Phillies. The deal included an $8 million club option for 2016 that vested based on plate appearances. In 154 games of 2014, Byrd struck out 185 times while batting .264 with 25 home runs and 85 RBI. On December 31, 2014, Byrd was traded to the Cincinnati Reds for starting pitcher Ben Lively.

On August 20, 2015, Byrd was traded to the San Francisco Giants for Double-A reliever Stephen Johnson. He hit a home run on his first at-bat with the Giants on August 21, 2015, against the Pittsburgh Pirates. Byrd hit the Giants' record-breaking eighth grand slam of the season against the Cardinals on August 28 against Michael Wacha. This was Byrd's first career hit against Wacha, and Wacha's first grand-slam given up. In 2015, he batted .247/.290/.453, and swung at 60.5% of all pitches he saw, tops in the major leagues.

After becoming a free agent following the 2015 season, Byrd signed a minor-league contract with the Cleveland Indians on March 18, 2016, with an invitation to major-league spring training camp. The Indians purchased his contract and added him to the active roster on April 3. In 34 games, he hit .270 with five home runs and 19 RBI before being suspended.

On June 1, 2016, Byrd was suspended 162 games for his second positive PED test. The day his suspension started, he told his teammates his career was over.

== See also ==
- List of Major League Baseball players suspended for performance-enhancing drugs
