= Vic Black =

American baseball player (born 1988)

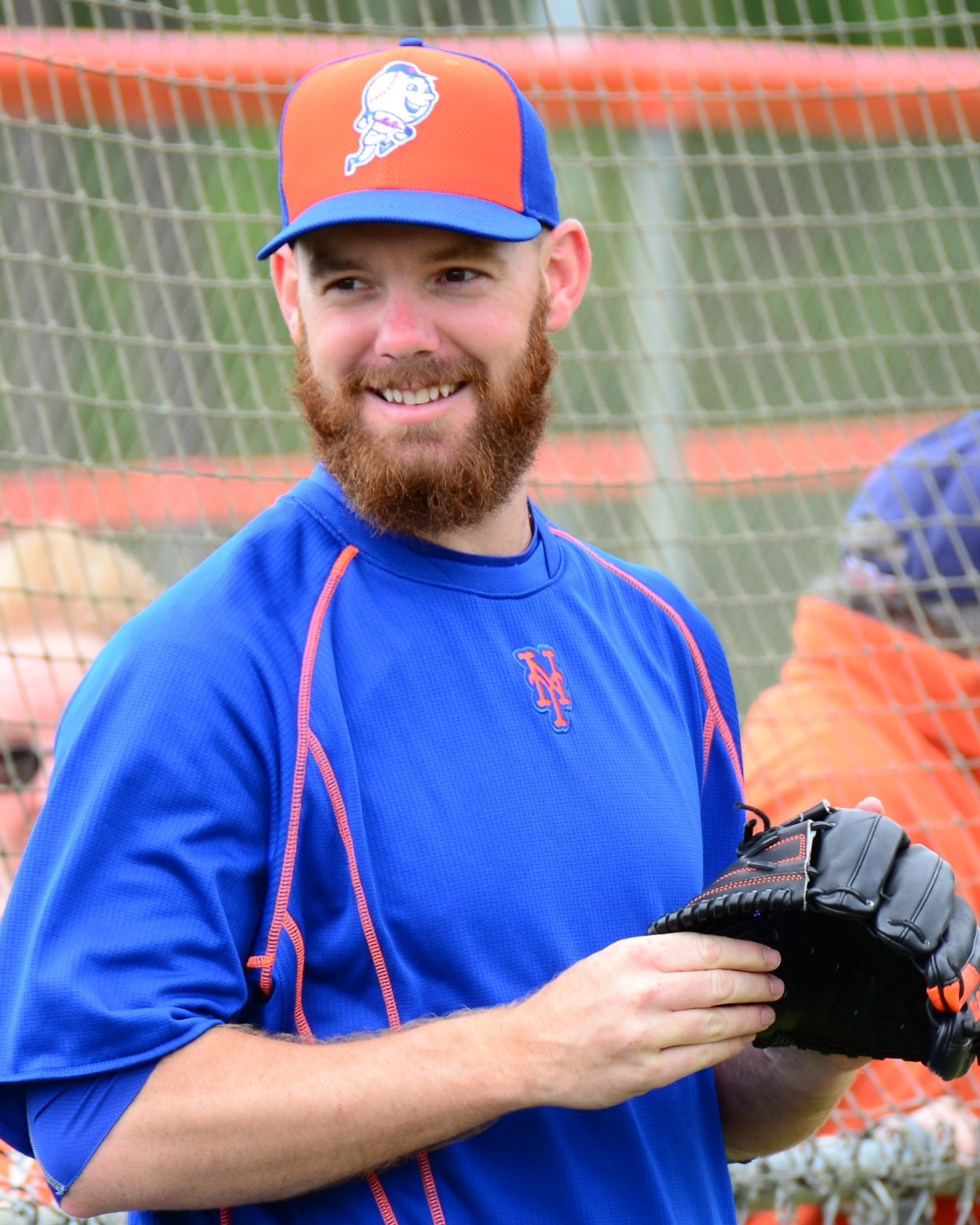
- Black with the New York Mets in 2015
- Pitcher
- Born: May 23, 1988 (age 38); Amarillo, Texas, U.S.
- Batted: Right Threw: Right

MLB debut
- July 25, 2013, for the Pittsburgh Pirates

Last MLB appearance
- September 13, 2014, for the New York Mets

MLB statistics (through 2014 season)
- Win–loss record: 5–3
- Earned run average: 2.96
- Strikeouts: 47
- Stats at Baseball Reference

Teams
- Pittsburgh Pirates (2013); New York Mets (2013–2014)

Victor Laurence Black (born May 23, 1988) is an American former professional baseball pitcher. He has played for the Pittsburgh Pirates and the New York Mets of Major League Baseball (MLB).

== Career ==
=== Amateur ===
Black is a right-handed pitcher, weighs 205 lbs, and is 6 ft 4 in. He attended Dallas Baptist University and is the highest drafted player in the university's history. In 2008, he played collegiate summer baseball with the Bourne Braves of the Cape Cod Baseball League. During his last season at Dallas Baptist, Black went 6–4 with a 4.16 ERA and 99 strikeouts in 88 2/3 innings.

=== Pittsburgh Pirates ===
The Pirates selected Black in the first round (49th overall) of the 2009 Major League Baseball draft. He made his professional debut for the State College Spikes on June 30, 2009.

Black started the 2010 season with the West Virginia Power, but only pitched 4 2/3 innings, dealing with shoulder and bicep injuries. He split the 2011 season between West Virginia and the Bradenton Marauders. He spent the 2012 season with the Altoona Curve of the Double A Eastern League. In November 2012, the Pirates added Black to the 40 man roster to protect him from the Rule 5 draft.

In 2013, Black pitched for the Indianapolis Indians of the Class AAA International League, and was named to the All-Star Game. The Pirates promoted Black to the major leagues, and he debuted with the Pirates on July 25. Black finished the 2013 season with the Pirates with a 4.50 ERA in 3 games in 4 innings pitched with a 2.000 WHIP with 3 strikeouts while giving up 6 hits, 2 earned runs, and 2 walks.

=== New York Mets ===
==== 2013 ====
The Pirates sent Black to the New York Mets on August 29, 2013, as the player to be named later in the trade that sent Dilson Herrera to the Mets in exchange for John Buck and Marlon Byrd. He was called up on September 1. On September 24, Black earned his first major league save in a 4–2 win against the Cincinnati Reds.

With the Mets, Black finished the 2013 season with a 3–0 record, 3.46 ERA in 15 games in 13 innings pitched with a 1.154 WHIP with one save and 12 strikeouts while giving up 11 hits, 5 earned runs, and 4 walks.

==== 2014 ====
Black started the year with the Las Vegas 51s. He was placed on the DL with the 51s on April 7 due to a pinched nerve on the right side of his neck. He was later activated off the DL. On May 24, Black was called up to join the Mets as the 26th player during a doubleheader against the Arizona Diamondbacks. On August 24, Black went on the DL due to a herniated disk in his neck. His spot on the roster was replaced by Daisuke Matsuzaka who was coming off the DL himself. He came off the DL on September 8. It was announced on September 15 that Black was shut down for about five to six days due to a shoulder strain. On September 23, Black was shut down for the rest of season.

Black finished the season with a 2–3 record, 2.60 ERA in 41 games in 34.2 innings pitched with a 1.298 WHIP with 32 strikeouts while giving up 26 hits, 12 runs (10 of them earned), and 19 walks.

==== 2015 ====
Black rehabbed the entire season in the minors with the St. Lucie Mets, Binghamton Mets and the Las Vegas 51s. On September 1, he was outrighted off the 40-man roster to the 51s. On November 7, Black elected free agency. In the minors with the three affiliates, he compiled a 1–6 record, 5.94 ERA in 41 games in 36.1 innings pitched with a 1.95 WHIP with 34 strikeouts and 3 saves while giving up 41 hits, 25 runs (24 of them earned), and 30 walks.

=== Sussex County Miners ===
On April 14, 2017, Black signed with the Sussex County Miners of the Can-Am League.

=== San Francisco Giants ===
On May 5, 2017, the San Francisco Giants signed Black to a minor league contract. He spent the remainder of the season split between the Low–A Salem-Keizer Volcanoes and Double–A Richmond Flying Squirrels. In 25 total games, he accumulated a 5.25 ERA with 27 strikeouts in 36.0 innings of work. He elected free agency following the season on November 6.

=== New Jersey Jackals ===
On March 6, 2018, Black signed with the New Jersey Jackals of the Can-Am League. He became a free agent after the season. In 15 games (9 starts) 55.2 innings going 2-4 with a 4.37 ERA with more walks (38) than strikeouts (37) and 1 save.
