= Gonzalez Germen =

Dominican baseball player (born 1987)

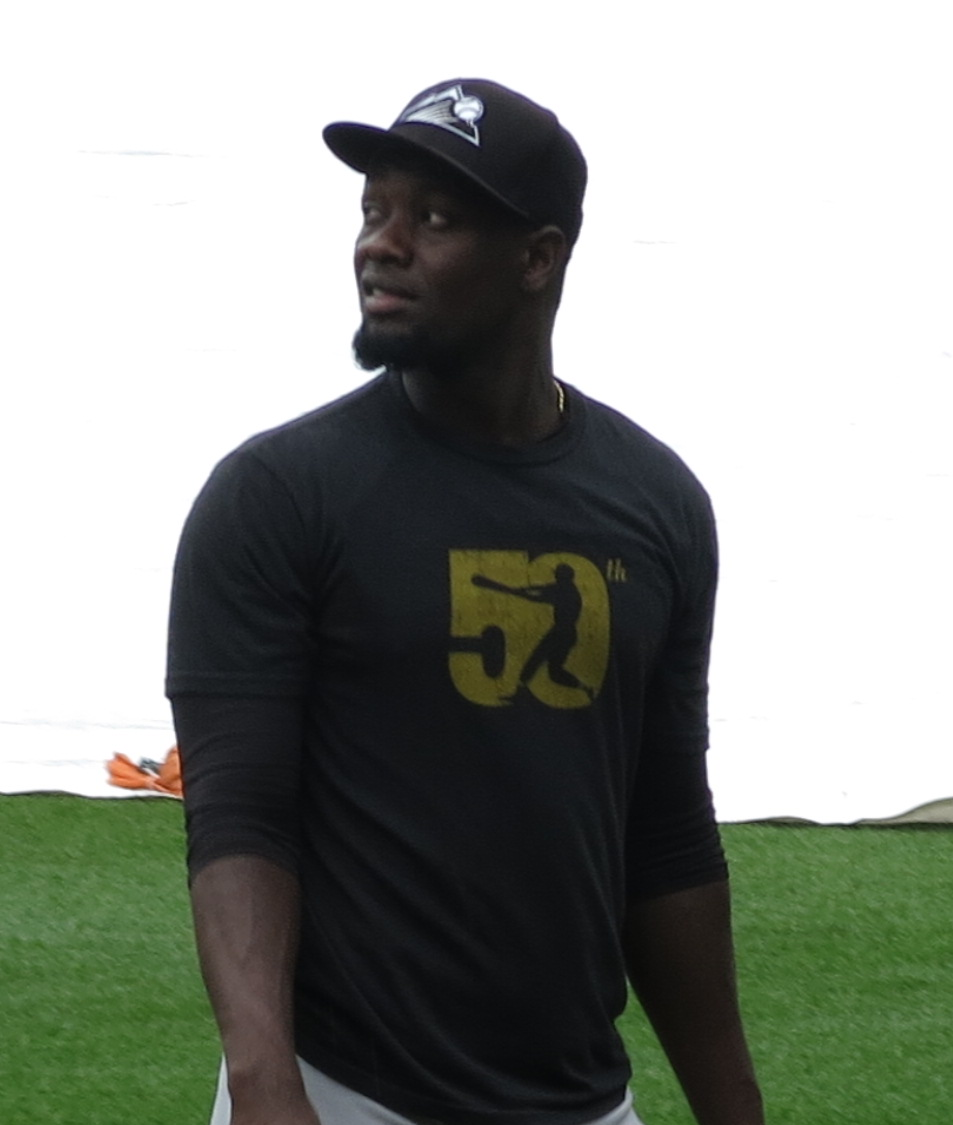
- Germen with the Rockies in 2016
- Pitcher
- Born: September 23, 1987 (age 38); La Romana, Dominican Republic
- Batted: Right Threw: Right

Professional debut
- MLB: July 12, 2013, for the New York Mets
- NPB: April 1, 2017, for the Orix Buffaloes

Last appearance
- MLB: August 10, 2016, for the Colorado Rockies
- NPB: October 2, 2017, for the Orix Buffaloes

MLB statistics
- Win–loss record: 3–3
- Earned run average: 4.63
- Strikeouts: 129

NPB statistics
- Win–loss record: 2–1
- Earned run average: 2.68
- Strikeouts: 51
- Stats at Baseball Reference

Teams
- New York Mets (2013–2014); Chicago Cubs (2015); Colorado Rockies (2015–2016); Orix Buffaloes (2017)

Gonzalez Germán Germen Figao (born September 23, 1987) is a Dominican former professional baseball pitcher. He has previously played in Major League Baseball (MLB) for the New York Mets, Chicago Cubs, and Colorado Rockies, and in Nippon Professional Baseball (NPB) for the Orix Buffaloes.

== Career ==
=== New York Mets ===
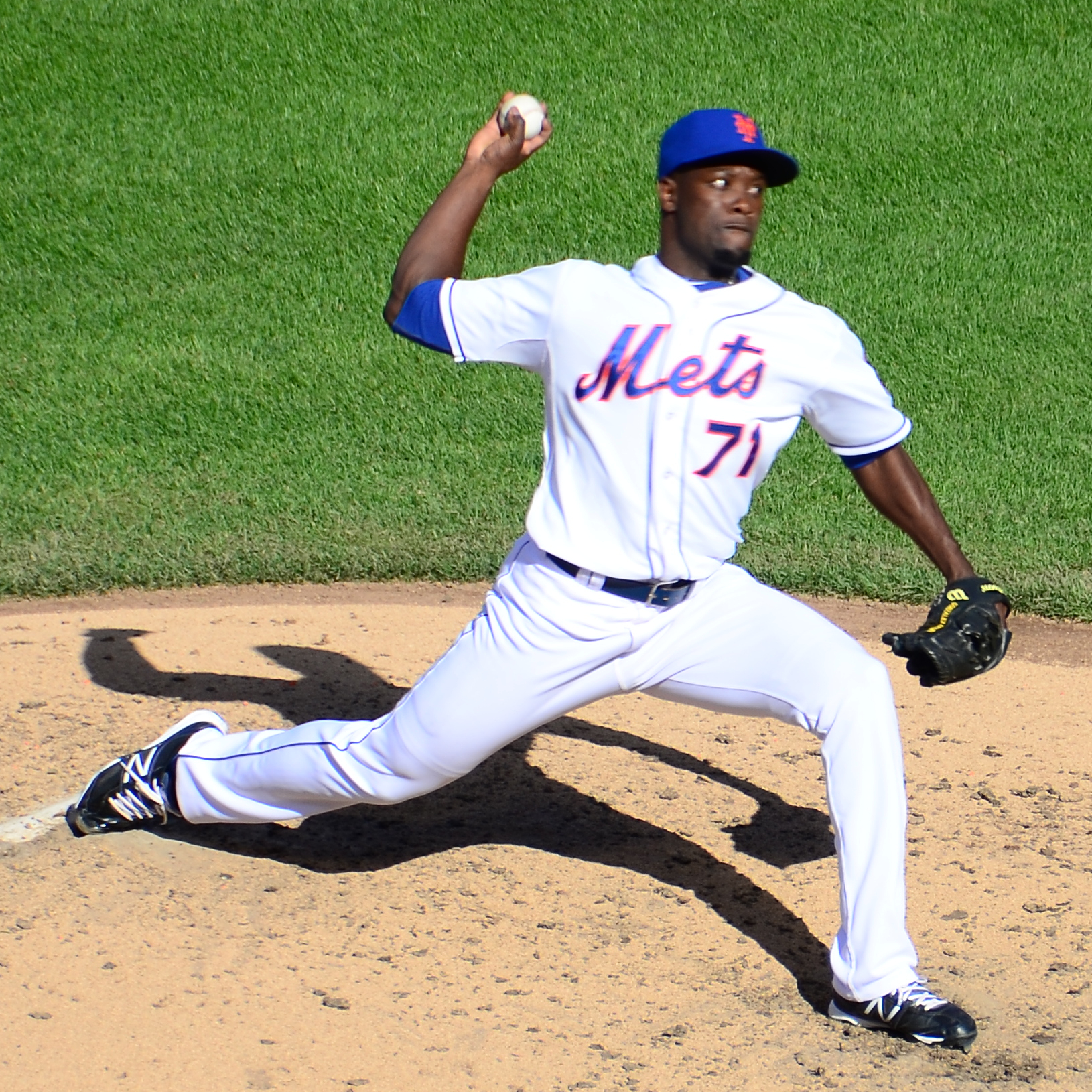
Germen with the Mets in 2013

Germen started the 2013 season with the Las Vegas 51s of the Class AAA Pacific Coast League. He made his major league debut with the Mets on July 12, 2013, in an extra inning game against the Pittsburgh Pirates. He received the loss.

Germen recorded his first major league save on August 16, 2013, against the San Diego Padres, pitching two innings. Germen ended the 2013 season with a 3.93 earned run average in 34 1/3 innings pitched. Germen also compiled 33 strikeouts, 1 save, and a 1.40 WHIP.

Germen was designated for assignment by the Mets on December 15, 2014.

=== Chicago Cubs ===
The Mets traded Germen to the New York Yankees on December 19. He was designated for assignment on January 13, 2015. The Yankees then traded him to the Texas Rangers on January 20, 2015, in exchange for cash considerations. The Rangers then also designated him for assignment, one day later.

Germen was subsequently claimed off waivers by the Chicago Cubs on January 23. They designated him for assignment on February 4 to make room for Drake Britton. The Cubs promoted Germen to the major leagues on April 19.

=== Colorado Rockies ===
Germen was claimed off waivers by the Colorado Rockies on July 7, 2015. In 29 appearances for the Rockies, he compiled a 3.86 ERA with 25 strikeouts and 1 save across 32 2/3 innings pitched. On October 14, Germen was removed from the 40–man roster and sent outright to the Triple–A Albuquerque Isotopes.

On August 12, 2016, Germen was designated for assignment, and outrighted to the Isotopes on August 15.

=== Orix Buffaloes ===
On December 13, 2016, Germen signed with the Orix Buffaloes of Nippon Professional Baseball. He made 44 appearances out of the bullpen for Orix, registering a 2.68 ERA with 51 strikeouts and 3 saves over 47 innings. Germen became a free agent on December 2, 2017.

=== Gunma Diamond Pegasus ===
On January 16, 2018, Germen signed a minor league deal with the Chicago White Sox. He was released by the organization on March 24.

On April 30, 2018, Germen signed with the Gunma Diamond Pegasus of the Baseball Challenge League.

=== Long Island Ducks ===
On June 28, 2018, Germen signed with the Long Island Ducks of the Atlantic League of Professional Baseball. He became a free agent following the 2018 season without ever appearing in a game.

=== Olmecas de Tabasco ===
On March 4, 2019, Germen signed with the Olmecas de Tabasco of the Mexican League. In 15 games for Tabasco, he struggled to a 7.31 ERA with 15 strikeouts and 4 saves across 16 innings pitched. German was released by the Olmecas on May 17.

=== Brantford Red Sox ===
On April 5, 2022, Germen signed with the Brantford Red Sox of the Intercounty Baseball League. He was released on May 5, 2022.

=== Guerreros de Oaxaca ===
On July 13, 2022, Germen signed with the Guerreros de Oaxaca of the Mexican League. Germen made 3 starts for Oaxaca, posting a 1–0 record and 4.76 ERA with 16 strikeouts in 17.0 innings pitched. On January 11, 2023, Germen was released.
