= Zach Lutz =

American baseball player (born 1986)

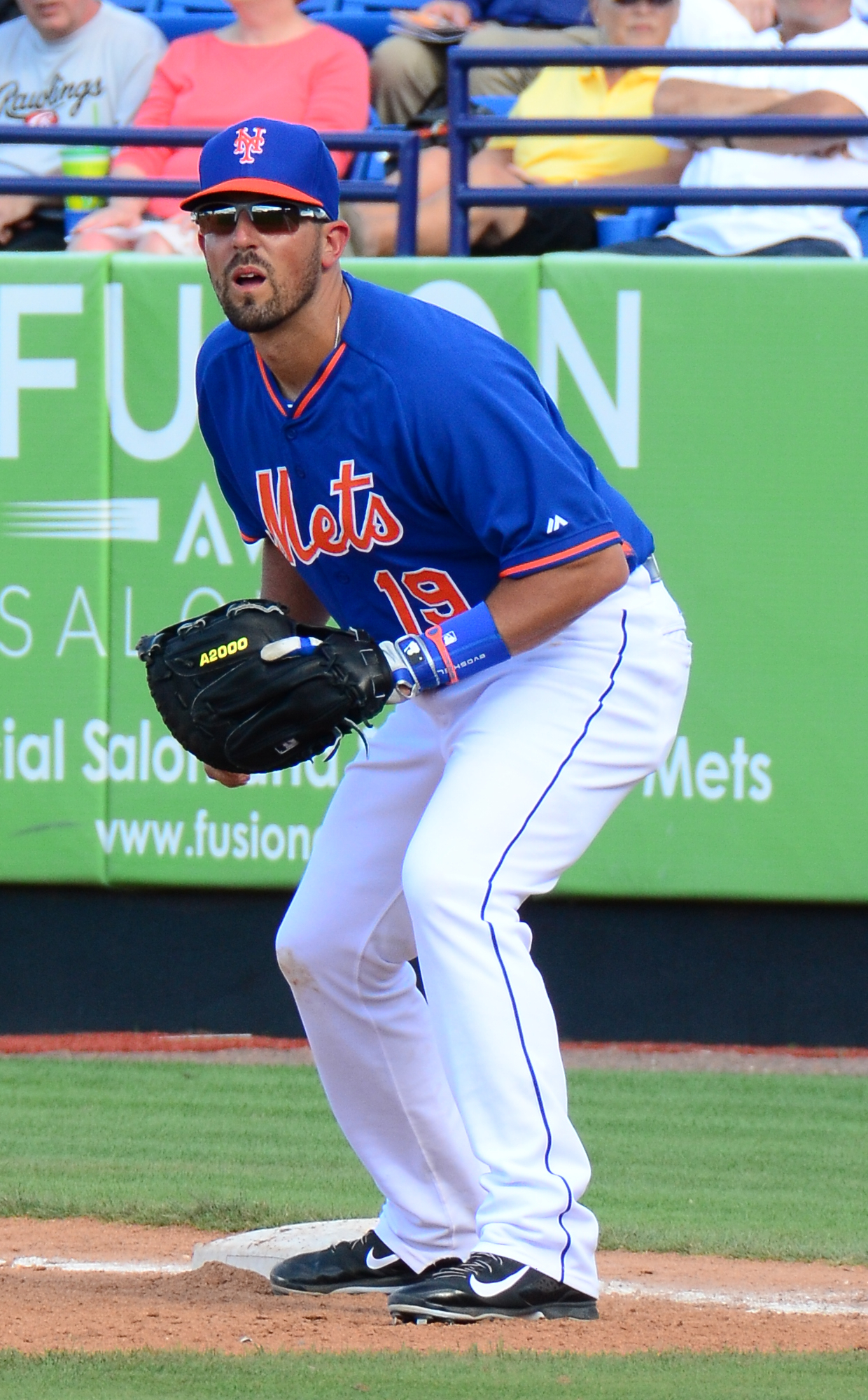
- Lutz with the New York Mets during spring training in 2014
- Third baseman / First baseman
- Born: June 3, 1986 (age 39); Reading, Pennsylvania, U.S.
- Batted: Right Threw: Right

Professional debut
- MLB: April 24, 2012, for the New York Mets
- NPB: June 21, 2014, for the Tohoku Rakuten Golden Eagles
- KBO: March 28, 2015, for the Doosan Bears

Last appearance
- MLB: September 28, 2013, for the New York Mets
- NPB: July 21, 2014, for the Tohoku Rakuten Golden Eagles
- KBO: April 22, 2015, for the Doosan Bears

MLB statistics
- Batting average: .226
- Home runs: 0
- Runs batted in: 2

NPB statistics
- Batting average: .314
- Home runs: 5
- Runs batted in: 18

KBO statistics
- Batting average: .111
- Home runs: 1
- Runs batted in: 3
- Stats at Baseball Reference

Teams
- New York Mets (2012–2013); Tohoku Rakuten Golden Eagles (2014); Doosan Bears (2015)

Zachary "Zach" Craig Lutz (born June 3, 1986) is an American former professional baseball third baseman. He played in Major League Baseball (MLB) for the New York Mets, in Nippon Professional Baseball (NPB) for the Tohoku Rakuten Golden Eagles, and in the KBO League for the Doosan Bears.

== Early life ==
Lutz was born on June 3, 1986, in Reading, Pennsylvania. He attended Governor Mifflin Senior High School in Shillington, Pennsylvania, then Alvernia University in Reading, where his father Yogi was the baseball coach. Zach played third base for the Alvernia Crusaders of the Division III Pennsylvania Athletic Conference (now known as the Colonial States Athletic Conference). He earned preseason All-American honors prior to his 2007 junior year.

== Professional career ==
=== New York Mets ===
In the 2007 Major League Baseball draft, Lutz was chosen in the 5th round by the New York Mets, and subsequently spent time in the Mets minor league system.

In the 2010 baseball season, Lutz played for the Binghamton Mets and Buffalo Bisons, the Mets' Double-A and Triple-A affiliates, despite missing around sixty days due to a stress fracture in his left foot. In 61 games for Binghamton, Lutz hit 17 home runs, finishing with a .967 OPS. At the end of the season, Lutz was promoted to Buffalo where he played five games, finishing with one home run while hitting to a .300 batting average. Prior to the 2011 season, the New York Mets placed Lutz on the 40-man roster to protect him from the Rule 5 draft.

On April 24, 2012, Lutz made his major league debut against the Miami Marlins, striking out in his one at-bat. Lutz got his first major league hit on April 27, in Denver against the Colorado Rockies. On September 1, Lutz was recalled by the Mets.

Lutz was again recalled on June 23, 2013, to fill in for Lucas Duda. He joined fellow Alvernia University alum Anthony Recker on the team.

Lutz began the 2014 season with the Triple-A Las Vegas 51s, slashing .291/.386/.449 with seven home runs and 37 RBI across 59 games. He was released by the Mets organization on June 11, 2014, in order to pursue an opportunity in Asia.

=== Tohoku Rakuten Golden Eagles ===
On June 16, 2014, Lutz signed with the Tohoku Rakuten Golden Eagles of the Nippon Professional Baseball League. In 15 appearances for the Eagles, Lutz slashed .314/.379/.667 with five home runs, 18 RBI, and one stolen base.

=== Doosan Bears ===
On January 14, 2015, Lutz signed with the Doosan Bears of the KBO League. Lutz played in eight games for the Bears, going 3-for-27 (.111) with one home run and three RBI.

=== New York Mets (second stint) ===
On July 16, 2015, Lutz signed a minor league contract to return to the New York Mets organization. He played in 23 games for the Triple-A Las Vegas 51s, hitting .203/.306/.297 with one home run and nine RBI.

=== Miami Marlins ===
On February 3, 2016, Lutz signed a minor league contract with the Miami Marlins. He made 16 appearances for the Triple-A New Orleans Zephyrs, going 3-for-35 (.086) with seven walks. Lutz was released by the Marlins organization on June 20.

=== Somerset Patriots ===
Lutz signed with the Somerset Patriots of the Atlantic League of Professional Baseball on March 1, 2017. In three games for Somerset, he went 1-for-8 (.125) with three walks. Lutz announced his retirement within a few weeks.
