= Anthony Recker =

American baseball player (born 1983)

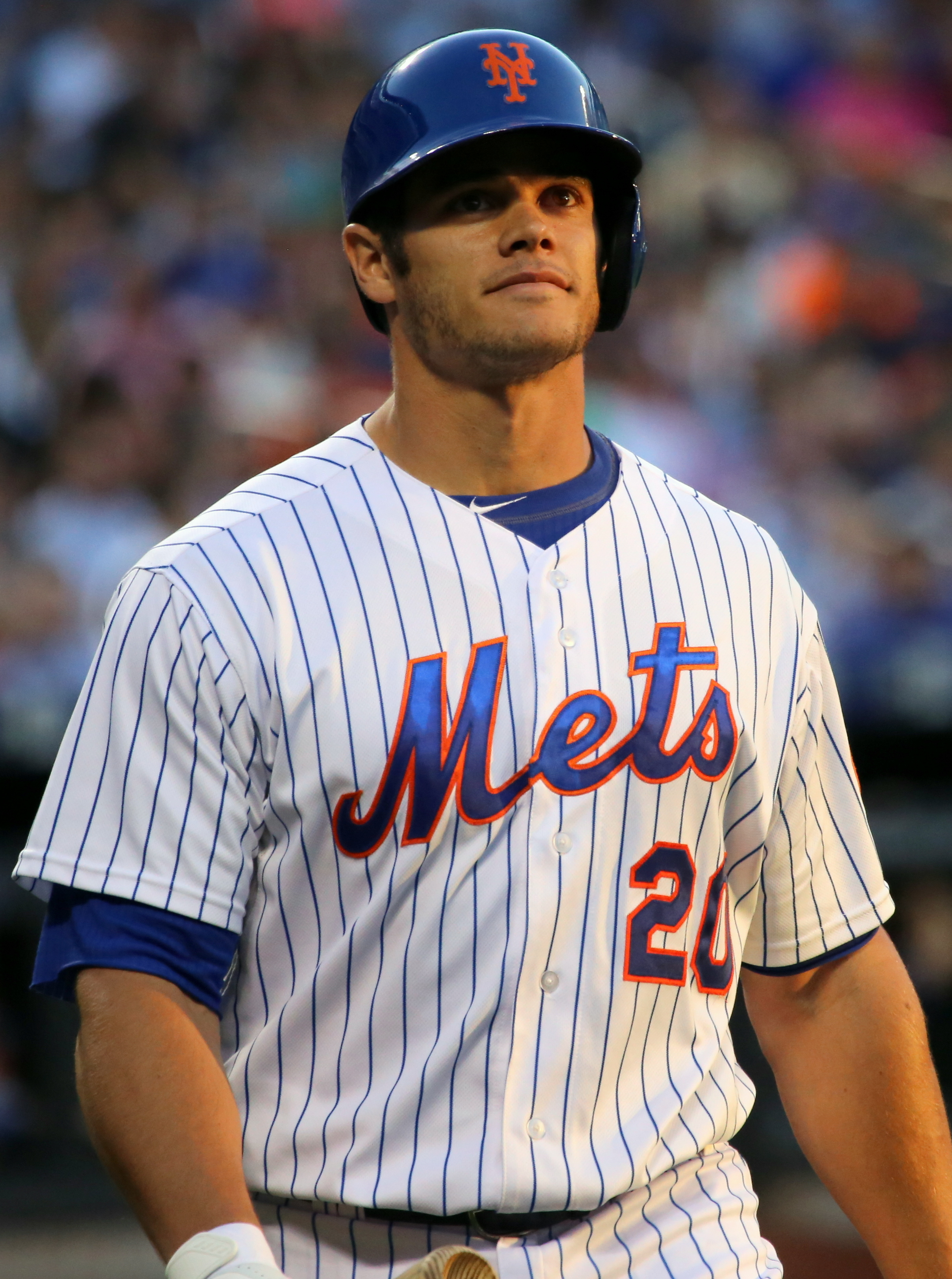
- Recker with the New York Mets in 2015
- Catcher / First baseman
- Born: August 29, 1983 (age 43); Catasauqua, Pennsylvania, U.S.
- Batted: Right Threw: Right

MLB debut
- August 25, 2011, for the Oakland Athletics

Last MLB appearance
- April 19, 2017, for the Atlanta Braves

MLB statistics
- Batting average: .199
- Home runs: 18
- Runs batted in: 70
- Stats at Baseball Reference

Teams
- Oakland Athletics (2011–2012); Chicago Cubs (2012); New York Mets (2013–2015); Atlanta Braves (2016–2017)

Anthony Vito Recker (born August 29, 1983) is an American broadcaster and former professional baseball catcher and first baseman. He played in Major League Baseball (MLB) for the Oakland Athletics, Chicago Cubs, New York Mets, and Atlanta Braves.

== Early life and education ==
Becker was born in Allentown, Pennsylvania, on August 29, 1984, and was raised by mother Alicia and stepfather Kip. He attended Catasauqua High School in Northampton, Pennsylvania, where he played baseball, football, and basketball.

After graduating from Catasauqua High School, he continued his baseball career at Alvernia College, an NCAA Division III school in Reading, Pennsylvania. One of Recker's college teammates was Zach Lutz. The pair were coached by Lutz's father. While playing for the Crusaders, Recker spent some time on the mound, where he occasionally threw a knuckleball. Despite growing up in Pennsylvania, Recker's favorite team was the Oakland Athletics.

== Playing career ==
=== Oakland Athletics ===
Recker was drafted by the Oakland Athletics in the 18th round of the 2005 Major League Baseball draft out of Alvernia College. He began catching and, on occasion, playing first base professionally.

On August 23, 2011, Recker was selected to the 40-man roster and promoted to the major leagues for the first time. He made five appearances for Oakland, going 3-for-17 (.176) with four walks. Recker was named to the Triple-A All-PCL Team in 2011, a season in which he powered 16 home runs for the Sacramento River Cats.

Recker made the Athletics' 2012 Opening Day roster, but was optioned to the Sacramento in May. In 13 appearances for the Athletics, he slashed .129/.250/.161 with four walks.

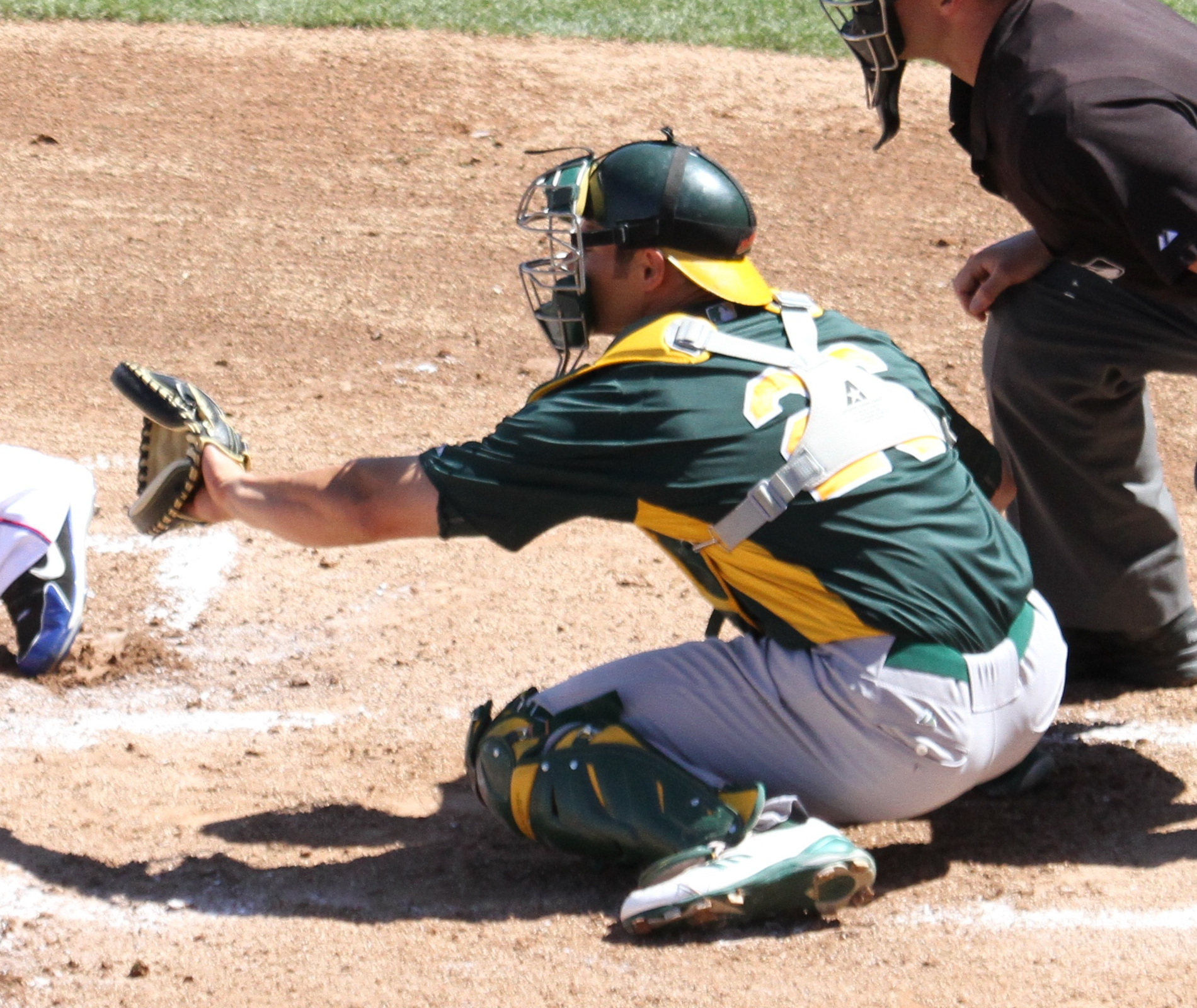
Recker playing for the Oakland Athletics in 2012 spring training

=== Chicago Cubs ===
Recker was traded to the Chicago Cubs in exchange for Blake Lalli on August 27, 2012. He made nine appearances for the Cubs, going 1-for-7 (.143). On October 24, Recker was designated for assignment by the Cubs following the acquisition of Carlos Gutiérrez.

=== New York Mets ===
On October 25, 2012, Recker was claimed off waivers by the New York Mets.

Recker made the Mets' 2013 Opening Day roster as a backup catcher. Although Recker is a position player, he pitched the ninth inning for the Mets to preserve their bullpen in a lopsided game on June 30, 2013, where the Mets were defeated by the Washington Nationals by a score of 13–2. The last position player to pitch for the Mets before Recker did so was catcher Rob Johnson on May 18, 2012. He was optioned to the Triple-A Las Vegas 51s on August 19. Recker was recalled on August 28, as a backup to Travis d'Arnaud, due to the trade that sent catcher John Buck and outfielder Marlon Byrd to the Pittsburgh Pirates.

Recker made the Opening Day roster in 2014 as a backup catcher to d'Arnaud. On April 12, Recker hit a solo home run in the top of the 13th off Matt Shoemaker to break the 6–6 tie between the Mets and Angels and win the game for the Mets 7–6.

After an early-season injury to d'Arnaud in 2015, the Mets kept Recker as a backup catcher, and promoted prospect Kevin Plawecki to serve as the starter. On April 14, he played third base in an emergency role. On May 14, Recker had his first career multi-homer game against the Chicago Cubs, a game that the Mets went on to lose. On November 6, Recker was removed from the 40-man roster and sent outright to the minor leagues, but rejected the assignment and elected free agency. Recker hit .125 with two home runs and five RBI in 80 at-bats in 32 games in 2015. From 2013 to 2015 as a Met, Recker hit 15 home runs in 140 games. However, Recker did manage to hit eight home runs in just 108 plate appearances while playing for the Las Vegas 51s. Recker was known for his propensity to hit home runs late in games or in key situations.

=== Cleveland Indians ===
On November 27, 2015, Recker signed a minor league contract with the Cleveland Indians, including an invitation to spring training. He appeared in 19 games for the Triple-A Columbus Clippers in 2016, slashing .246/.395/.426 with two home runs, 10 RBI, and one stolen base.

=== Atlanta Braves ===
Recker was traded to the Atlanta Braves on May 9, 2016, for cash considerations, and assigned to the Triple-A Gwinnett Braves. The Braves promoted Recker to the major leagues after an injury to Tyler Flowers that July.

On December 2, 2016, Recker and the Braves avoided salary arbitration by agreeing to an $800,000 contract for the 2017 season. He was initially optioned to Gwinnett at the end of spring training, but eventually was selected as one of the last two players to make the Braves’ 2017 Opening Day roster, alongside Chaz Roe. He had his contract purchased on July 21, 2017.

=== Minnesota Twins ===
On July 24, 2017, the Braves traded Recker, Jaime García, and cash considerations to the Minnesota Twins for prospect Huascar Ynoa. The Twins subsequently removed Recker from the 40-man roster and sent him outright to the Triple-A Rochester Red Wings on July 28. He appeared in 19 games for the Triple-A Rochester, hitting .286/.333/.414 with no home runs and eight RBI. Recker elected free agency on October 10.

=== Arizona Diamondbacks ===
On March 5, 2018, Recker signed a minor-league contract with the Arizona Diamondbacks, which included an invitation to spring training. He spent the season with the Triple–A Reno Aces, catching in 66 of the 74 games in which he appeared and hitting .276/.358/.537 with 15 home runs and 50 RBI. Recker elected free agency following the season on November 2.

== Post-playing career ==
He became an analyst on SNY, the network of the New York Mets, where he has filled in for Keith Hernandez and Ron Darling in the booth with Gary Cohen. "In early 2019, I decided [playing baseball] wasn’t the right thing for me to do anymore," he said in April 2020. "As soon as I made that decision, I quickly turned my gaze toward the TV world. It was something I liked doing and I already had a little bit of experience" from working the David Wright finale in September 2018.

== Personal life ==
Recker married Kelly Shepardson on November 2, 2013. His wife Kelly gave birth to their first child, Camden Anthony Recker, on December 29, 2014. They also have a younger son, Grady.
