= Bobby Parnell =

American baseball pitcher (born 1984)

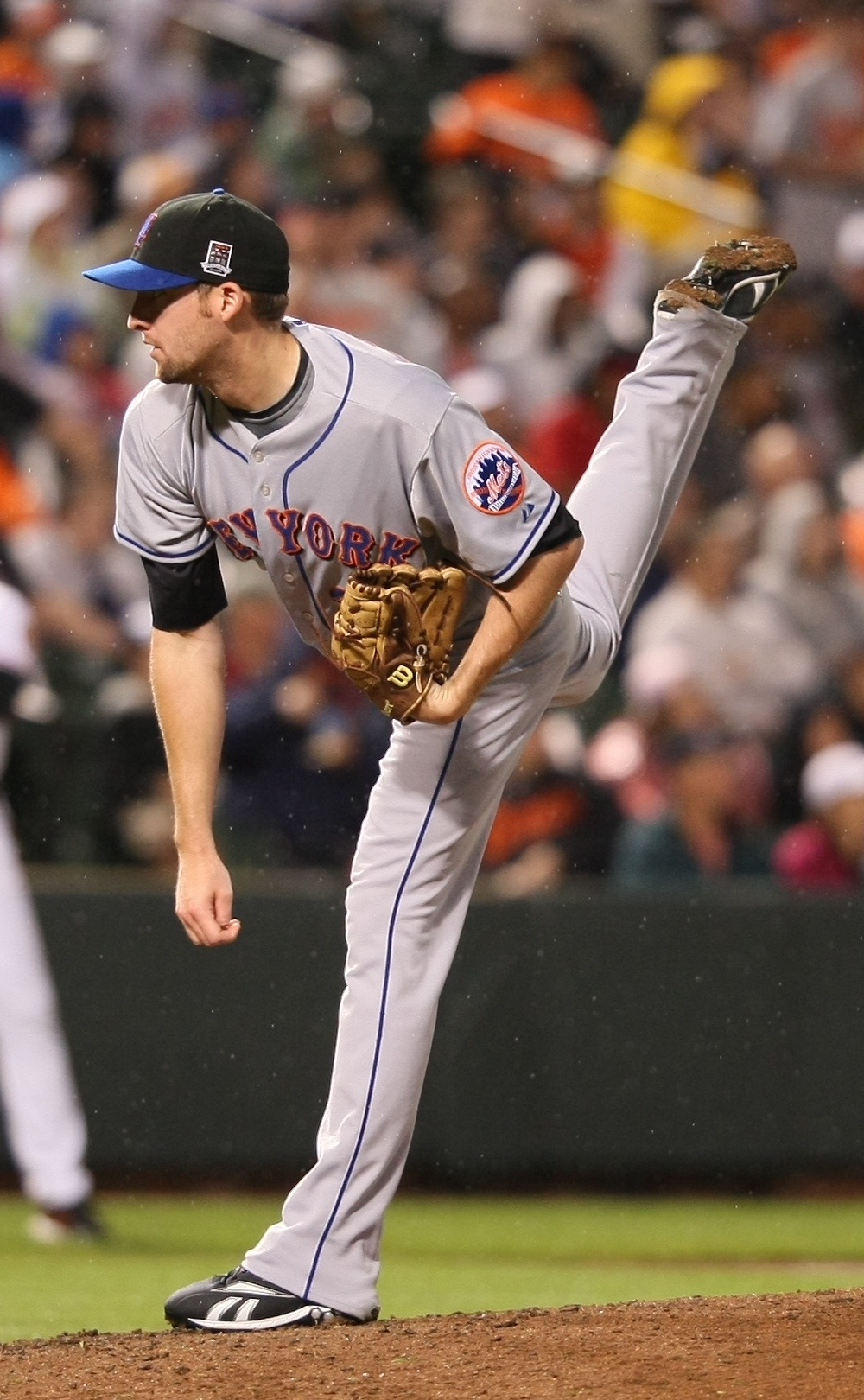
- Parnell pitching for the New York Mets in 2009
- Pitcher
- Born: September 8, 1984 (age 42); Salisbury, North Carolina, U.S.
- Batted: Right Threw: Right

MLB debut
- September 15, 2008, for the New York Mets

Last MLB appearance
- July 8, 2016, for the Detroit Tigers

MLB statistics
- Win–loss record: 20–28
- Earned run average: 3.82
- Strikeouts: 297
- Stats at Baseball Reference

Teams
- New York Mets (2008–2015); Detroit Tigers (2016)

Robert Allen Parnell (born September 8, 1984) is an American former baseball pitcher. He played in Major League Baseball (MLB) for the New York Mets and Detroit Tigers. He was drafted by the Mets in the ninth round of the 2005 Major League Baseball draft after attending Charleston Southern University.

== Amateur career ==
Bobby Parnell was born on September 9, 1984, in Salisbury, North Carolina. His father, also named Robert, and his grandfather were both firefighters. He attended East Rowan High School in Salisbury, where he was primarily a third baseman. Parnell converted from shortstop to pitcher as a freshman with the Charleston Southern University Buccaneers. In 2004, he played collegiate summer baseball with the Chatham A's of the Cape Cod Baseball League. Despite still struggling to control his pitches even after three years of pitching in college, the New York Mets took the advice of Parnell's former American Legion coach and selected Parnell in the 9th round of the 2005 Major League Baseball draft with the 269th overall pick.

== Minor league career ==
Parnell worked as a starter for the minor league teams in the Mets organization, pitching for the Brooklyn Cyclones, St. Lucie Mets, Binghamton Mets, and New Orleans Zephyrs. In three different leagues, Parnell has been named a mid-season All-Star. He earned the honor in the New York–Penn League in 2005, the Florida State League in 2007, and the Eastern League in 2008.

== Major league career ==
=== New York Mets (2008–2015) ===
==== 2008 ====
Parnell earned Eastern League All-Star honors again in 2008. Despite having a poor record since being promoted to the Triple-A New Orleans Zephyrs, Parnell was rewarded with a call-up to the New York Mets on September 1, 2008. He made his major league debut on September 15.

==== 2009 ====
Parnell earned a spot in the Mets bullpen to start the 2009 season. He got his first win May 8, 2009, against the Pirates; he pitched a scoreless eighth inning. On August 5, he got his first major league hit in his first career at-bat, as he pitched three innings for his first career save. After Mets pitcher Jon Niese suffered a season-ending injury in the same game, Parnell was tabbed to replace Niese in the rotation. He made his first major league start on August 8 against the San Diego Padres. He earned his first major league win as a starter in his second start on August 14, pitching six innings, giving up only three hits, and striking out seven. On September 4, Parnell shut down the Cubs that battered him in his last start. Parnell pitched a career-high seven innings, shutting out the Cubs on five hits while striking out seven.

==== 2010 ====
On June 29, 2010 Jenrry Mejía was sent back down to Double-A Binghamton and the Mets called up Parnell to take his spot in the Mets bullpen.

Parnell, in his short major league career, has already developed a reputation for being a flamethrower. His fastballs consistently touch the high-90s, sometimes eclipsing 100 MPH. On August 18, 2010, in a game against the Houston Astros, Parnell hit 102.5 MPH on the radar gun, the fastest pitch in the major leagues in 2010 up to that point. Cincinnati Reds rookie Aroldis Chapman set the new mark on August 31, 2010, at 103.9 MPH.

On September 21, Parnell was shut down for the remainder of the 2010 season with an inflamed plica in his right elbow.

==== 2011 ====
On April 21, 2011, Parnell was placed on the DL due to a clot in his finger.

On May 30, 2011, he returned to the club as José Reyes was placed on the Bereavement list due to the death of his grandmother.

On June 29, 2011, he made a relief appearance against the Tigers. In an at bat against Miguel Cabrera, Parnell threw seven straight pitches over 100 mph.

==== 2012 ====
To begin the year Parnell was used as a middle reliever, yet as injuries mounted he was tabbed to be the closer. On June 28, 2012, Parnell recorded his first save of the year against the Los Angeles Dodgers.

==== 2013 ====
Parnell was named the Mets closer for the 2013 season due to an injury to Frank Francisco. Parnell recorded 22 saves before being shut down for the rest of the season on July 30.

==== 2014 ====
Parnell was named the Mets closer for the 2014 season. On opening day, he blew his first save opportunity. The next day, it was reported that Parnell tore his ulnar collateral ligament and he underwent Tommy John surgery shortly thereafter, ending his season.

==== 2015 ====
On January 7, 2015, Parnell and the Mets agreed to a one-year deal worth $3.7 million, and avoided arbitration. Parnell made his return to the major leagues in a June 13 win against the Atlanta Braves at Citi Field. Parnell pitched well in the relief appearance and said of his return, "It sent chills up my spine." However, Parnell's fastball velocity was noticeably lower than before his surgery and manager Terry Collins described Parnell as looking "rusty."

On August 18, 2015, after pitching poorly in a weekend series against the Pittsburgh Pirates and taking two losses, (along with a 14.14 ERA in his last 10 appearances) he was placed on the 15-day disabled list with arm fatigue. He became a free agent following the season.

=== Detroit Tigers ===
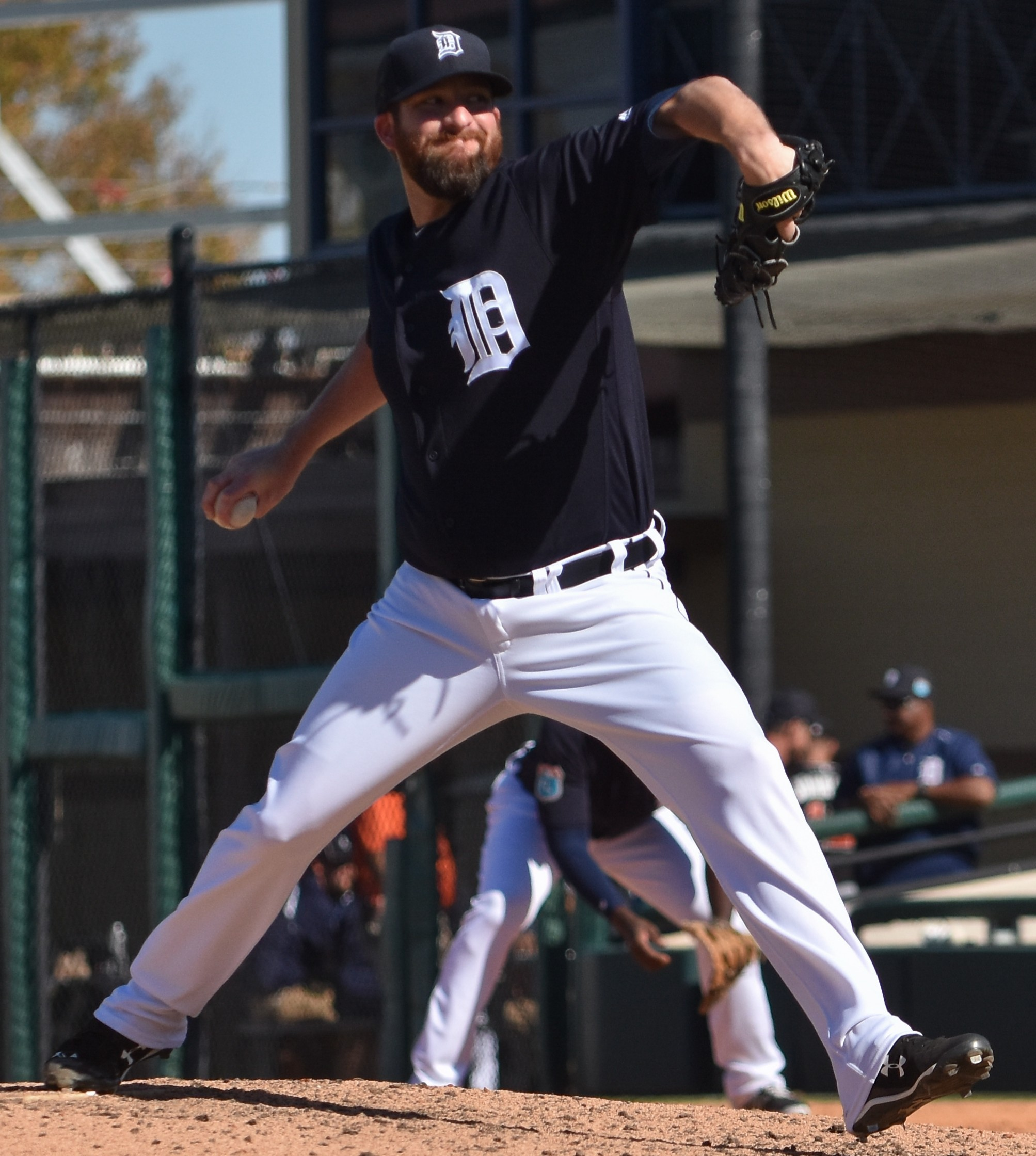
Parnell with the Detroit Tigers in 2016 Spring Training

On February 19, 2016, Parnell signed a minor league contract with the Detroit Tigers, and was invited to spring training. On March 28, Parnell was released by the Tigers. On March 30, the Tigers re-signed Parnell to a minor league contract. On June 1, Parnell was recalled by the Tigers. He was designated for assignment on August 18. On August 21, 2016, the Tigers released Parnell.

=== Kansas City Royals ===
On January 7, 2017, Parnell signed a minor league contract with the Kansas City Royals. He exercised an opt out clause in his contract on May 31, 2017, and became a free agent.

=== Chicago White Sox ===
On June 6, 2017, Parnell and the White Sox agreed to a minor league deal. He was released on July 24, 2017.

== Pitching style ==
Parnell throws primarily a hard four-seam fastball in the mid-to-high 90s with strong tailing action. His secondary pitch and main breaking ball in 2011 was a high-80s slider, but in 2012 he dropped the pitch in favor of a mid-80s knuckle curve. He has also toyed in the past with a splitter, but he rarely uses it. For 2012, he also developed a two-seam fastball.

== Personal life ==
In 2011, Parnell married Maegan Walker in Concord, North Carolina. In 2010, Parnell adopted a Golden Retriever–yellow Labrador Retriever mix from North Shore Animal League which they named "Abby." The couple lives in Parnell's hometown of Salisbury. In January 2016, the couple welcomed twin daughters Ava and Caroline.
