= Nickeas =

Nickeas is a surname. Notable people with the surname include:

- Mark Nickeas (born 1956), English football defender
- Mike Nickeas (born 1983), Canadian former professional baseball catcher and coach
- Nicholas Charles Nickeas (1946–2011), American sportscaster and journalist
