= Nigel Clutton =

English footballer

Personal information
- Date of birth: 12 February 1954 (age 72)
- Place of birth: Chester, England
- Position: Forward

Senior career*
Years	Team	Apps	(Gls)
1978	Chester	1	(0)
- * Club domestic league appearances and goals

Nigel Clutton (born 12 February 1954) is an English former footballer who played as a forward. He made a professional appearance for his hometown club, Chester.

Clutton was a prolific striker playing Saturday and Sunday League football for Chester-based sides Blacon YC, Crusaders, Reliance and the Union Vaults and working as a milkman when he was given his solitary Football League outing for Chester on 1 March 1978 at home to Carlisle United. Clutton was given his chance due to injuries to Ian Edwards and Ian Howat and he lined up in attack alongside new signing Ian Mellor

Nigel still lives in Chester with his wife, Helen and cat, Teddy. .
