= Phil Williams =

Phil Williams may refer to:

- Phil Williams (Welsh politician) (1939–2003), Welsh space scientist & Plaid Cymru politician
- Phil Williams (Alabama representative), American politician, member of the Alabama House of Representatives
- Phil Williams (Alabama senator) (born 1965), American politician, member of the Alabama Senate
- Phil Williams (baseball), American baseball player
- Phil Williams (presenter) (born 1974), British radio news reporter and presenter
- Phil Williams (footballer, born 1958), English football player for Chester City
- Phil Williams (footballer, born 1963), Welsh football player
- Phil Williams (priest) (born 1964), Archdeacon of Nottingham

== See also ==
- Philip Williams (disambiguation)
