= Rob Johnson (baseball) =

American baseball player (born 1982)

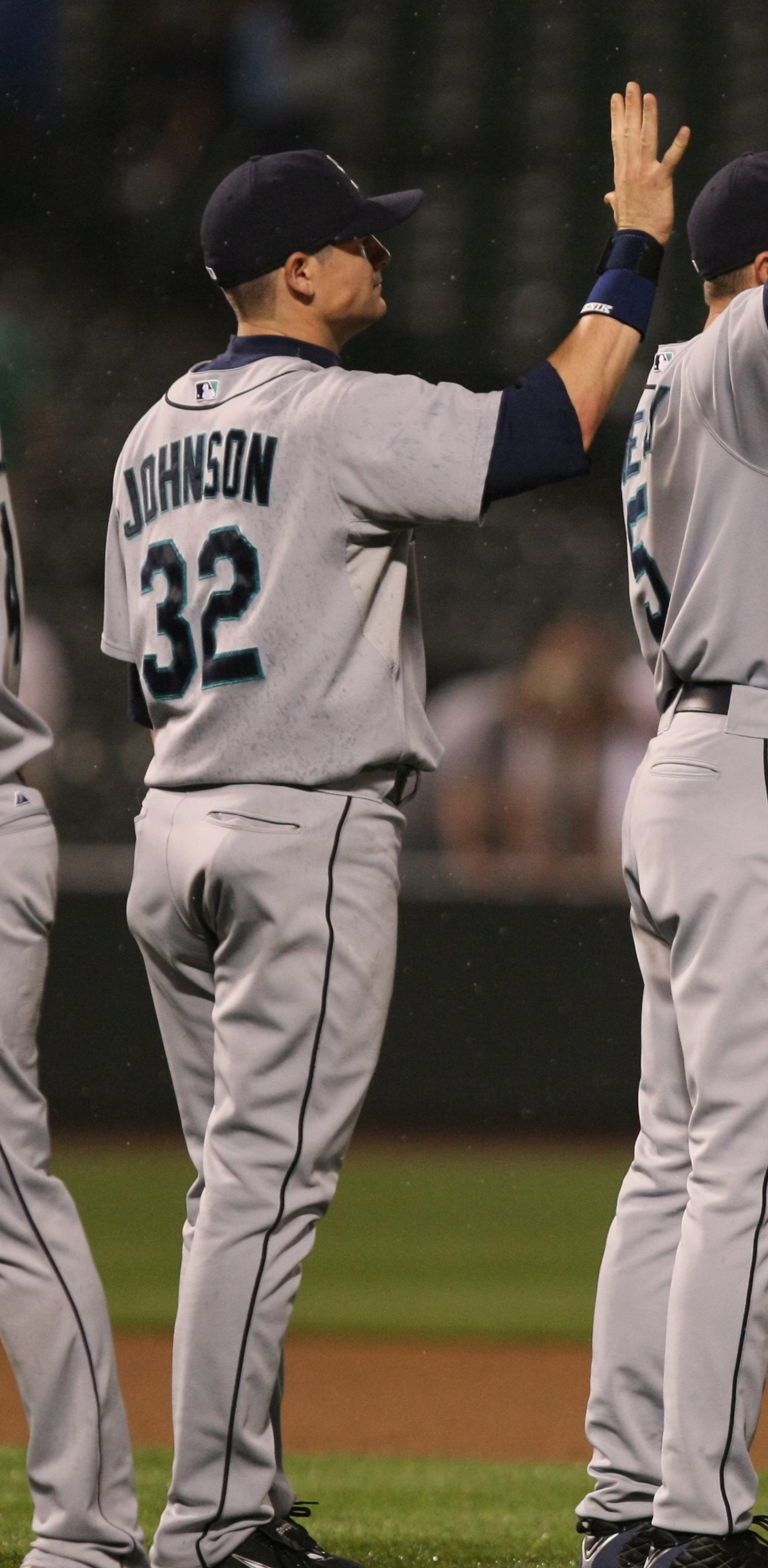
- Johnson with the Seattle Mariners in 2009
- Catcher
- Born: July 22, 1982 (age 44); Anaconda, Montana, U.S.
- Batted: Right Threw: Right

MLB debut
- September 4, 2007, for the Seattle Mariners

Last MLB appearance
- September 14, 2013, for the St. Louis Cardinals

MLB statistics
- Batting average: .200
- Home runs: 8
- Runs batted in: 64
- Stats at Baseball Reference

Teams
- Seattle Mariners (2007–2010); San Diego Padres (2011); New York Mets (2012); St. Louis Cardinals (2013)

Robert James Johnson (born July 22, 1982) is an American former professional baseball catcher and pitcher. He played in Major League Baseball (MLB) for the Seattle Mariners, San Diego Padres, New York Mets, and St. Louis Cardinals from 2007 to 2013.

== Amateur career ==
Johnson attended Saddleback College, Mission Viejo, California, and was named MVP of the Orange Empire League in 2003. In 2003, he attended the University of Houston for one season. In the summer of 2003, he played collegiate summer baseball in the Cape Cod Baseball League for the Yarmouth-Dennis Red Sox. He was drafted by the Seattle Mariners in 4th round (123rd overall) of the 2004 Major League Baseball draft.

== Professional career ==
=== Seattle Mariners ===
Following a breakout 2005 season, Seattle Mariners General Manager Bill Bavasi promoted Johnson to the Triple-A level Tacoma Rainiers at the start of the 2006. After the free agent signing of Japanese baseball star catcher Kenji Johjima and the selection of USC slugging catcher Jeff Clement, Johnson moved down the Mariners organizational depth chart. In 2007, he was named the Tacoma Rainiers team captain.

Johnson made his MLB debut on September 4, 2007, and played sparingly for the rest of the campaign with the Mariners. He had 1 hit (his first in MLB) in 3 at-bats and also stole a base during his callup, during which he appeared in 6 games.

Johnson was recalled to Seattle for the final month of the 2008 season when the rosters expanded from 25 to 40 for the month of September during which he hit his first major league home run, a two-run blast off of Jerry Blevins of the Oakland Athletics in a game on September 27 at Safeco Field. He played in the Arizona Fall League after the season.

Going into 2009 spring training, it was thought that catcher Jeff Clement would be the back-up catcher and designated hitter on the opening day roster. However, with the signing of the left-handed hitting Ken Griffey Jr., Clement would have little playing time at the designated hitter position. This left the door open for Johnson on the opening day roster.

In 2009, Johnson cracked the opening day roster with the Mariners for the first time in his career. Primarily used as a back-up catcher in the beginning on the season, Johnson later became the a starter due to his good rapport with the Mariners' pitching staff and an early season injury to primary catcher Kenji Johjima. When Johjima was activated from the disabled list Johnson again became the back-up catcher. However, Johjima again went on the disabled list in late-May and Johnson became the primary catcher again. Mariners manager Don Wakamatsu stated that Johnson handled the pitching staff better than Johjima.

On June 13, Johnson was placed on the bereavement list to respond to a "family emergency". On June 19, he was activated from the bereavement list.

In a 7–6 Mariners win over the Boston Red Sox, Johnson tied a club record with three doubles in one game on July 3. His third double of the game became the decisive hit as it scored the winning run for the Mariners in the top of the 11th inning in Fenway Park.

At season's end it was reported that Johnson would undergo three surgeries, the first on his left hip, the second on his right hip and the third on his left wrist. He was expected to make a recovery in time for spring training. Johnson's hip ailments were detected during an MRI exam on October 5 in Seattle. It was a similar injury sustained by Alex Rodriguez of the New York Yankees.

Johnson's 2010 season was a disappointment, hitting .191/.293/.281 in 61 games for the Mariners. He was demoted to the AAA Tacoma Rainiers on August 3, where he hit .297/.403/.453 in 19 games. On December 13, he was designated for assignment by the Mariners.

=== San Diego Padres ===
The Mariners traded Johnson to the San Diego Padres on December 21, 2010 for cash or a player to be named later. He played in 67 games for the Padres, batting .190 as a back up to Nick Hundley. He elected free agency after the season.

=== New York Mets ===
On December 22, 2011, Johnson signed a minor league contract with the New York Mets with an invitation to spring training. On May 8, 2012, Johnson was called up after Josh Thole was sent to the 7-day disabled list. On May 18, 2012, Johnson pitched a 1-2-3 bottom of the eighth inning in a 14–5 loss to the Toronto Blue Jays. Johnson became the first position player to pitch for the Mets since Todd Zeile on July 26, 2004. After hitting .313/.371/.344 over 34 at-bats while sharing time behind the plate with Mike Nickeas, Johnson was optioned to Triple-A Buffalo upon Thole's return on June 1. On June 25, he was recalled after Nickeas was sent down, only to get sent back down to Buffalo on August 15 after the Mets traded for Kelly Shoppach. The move was rescinded and Johnson was placed on the disabled list after it was discovered he had suffered a torn ligament in his left thumb. His season over, Johnson was outrighted off the Mets' 40-man roster October 17 and became a free agent.

=== St. Louis Cardinals ===
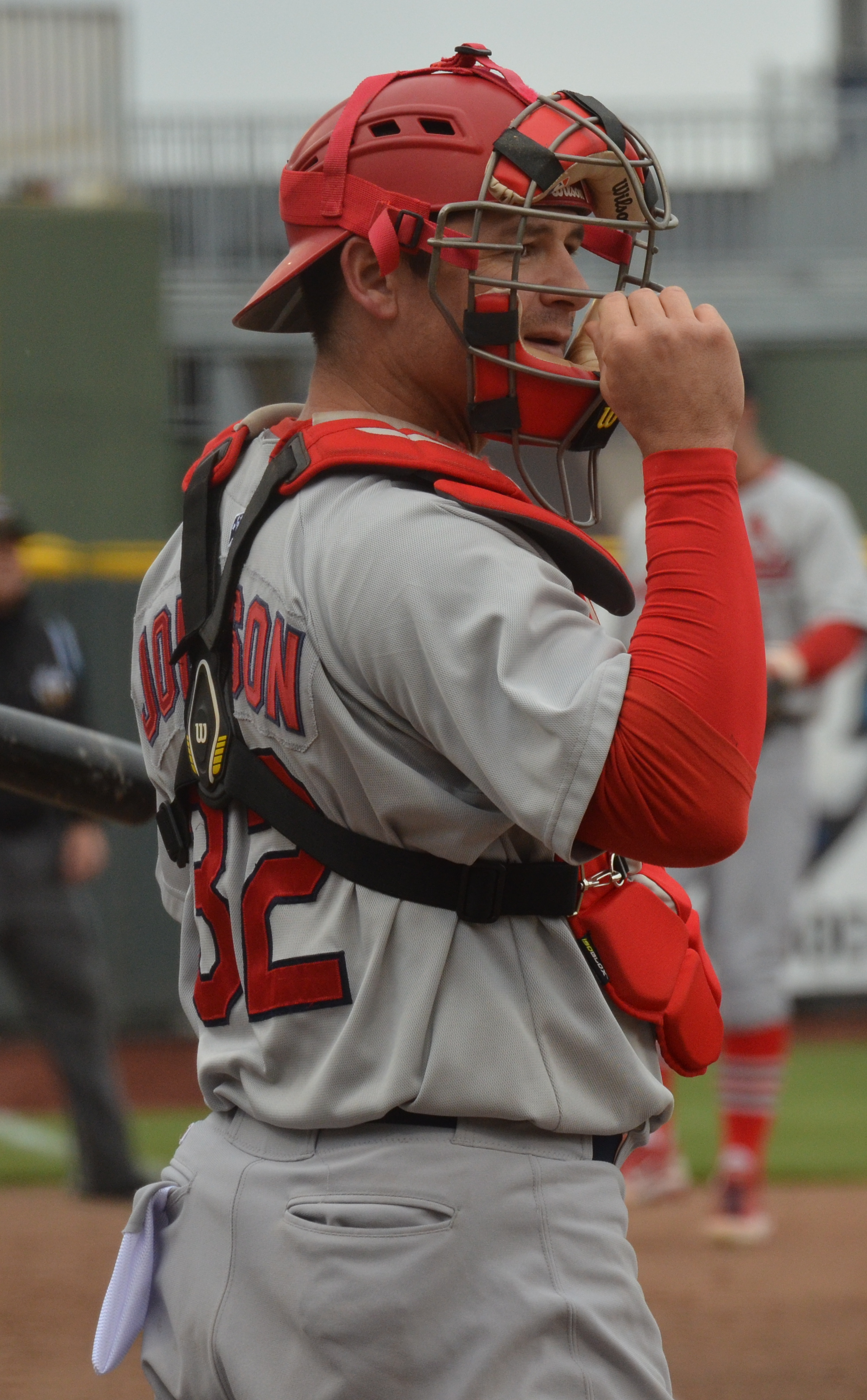
Johnson playing for the Memphis Redbirds, triple-A affiliates of the St. Louis Cardinals, in 2013

On November 13, 2012, Johnson signed a minor league deal with the St. Louis Cardinals with a non-roster invitation to spring training. St. Louis purchased called him up from Triple-A on July 9, 2013. Johnson pitched to secure the final out in a 13–4 loss to the Dodgers on August 7, 2013. He struck out Dodgers' rookie pitcher Paco Rodriguez on 4 pitches. The Cardinals released Johnson on November 5, and he elected free agency. He had 35 at-bats with St. Louis in 2013.

=== San Diego Padres (second stint) ===
Johnson signed a minor league deal with the San Diego Padres on February 14, 2014, intending to switch to pitching full-time. However, after being sidelined in the spring due to elbow pain, Johnson learned that he had torn the ulnar collateral ligament in his throwing arm and would need to undergo Tommy John surgery in order to catch again.

On May 23, 2014, Johnson announced via his official Facebook page that he had chosen to retire from professional baseball.

== Personal life ==
Born in Butte, Montana, Johnson played Little League in Whitehall. He attended Butte Central Catholic High School (graduated 2001). He played for the local American Legion team. (Montana and Wyoming were the only states without high school baseball). He worked on his family ranch through his junior year in high school.

== Family ==
Johnson resides in Austin, Texas. He married in 2006, and he and his wife have four children.
