= Paul Crossley (footballer) =

English footballer

Personal information
- Date of birth: 14 July 1948
- Place of birth: Rochdale, England
- Date of death: 11 March 1996 (aged 47)
- Place of death: Forest Park, Washington, United States
- Position: Winger

Senior career*
Years	Team	Apps	(Gls)
1965–1966	Rochdale	17	(2)
1966–1969	Preston North End	3	(0)
1968–1969	→ Southport (loan)	10	(2)
1969–1975	Tranmere Rovers	203	(37)
1975	Seattle Sounders	20	(4)
1975–1978	Chester	99	(26)
1977–1980	Seattle Sounders	57	(12)
1980–1983	Baltimore Blast (indoor)	103	(45)

Managerial career
- Loyola University (assistant)
- 1991–1995: Shoreline Community College
- * Club domestic league appearances and goals

Paul Crossley (14 July 1948 – 11 March 1996) was an English professional footballer. He usually played as a winger.

== Career ==
Crossley spent most of his career playing in the lower divisions of The Football League in England, but also enjoyed spells in the US with Seattle Sounders. He finished his career with the Baltimore Blast of the Major Indoor Soccer League.

Crossley served as an assistant coach with Loyola University. In 1991, he became the head coach of Shoreline Community College in Seattle. He also coached at several local high schools including Bothell, Shorecrest, Lynnwood, and Redmond. At the time of his death by heart attack, he had compiled a 46-30-17 record at Shoreline.
