= Travis d'Arnaud =

American baseball player (born 1989)

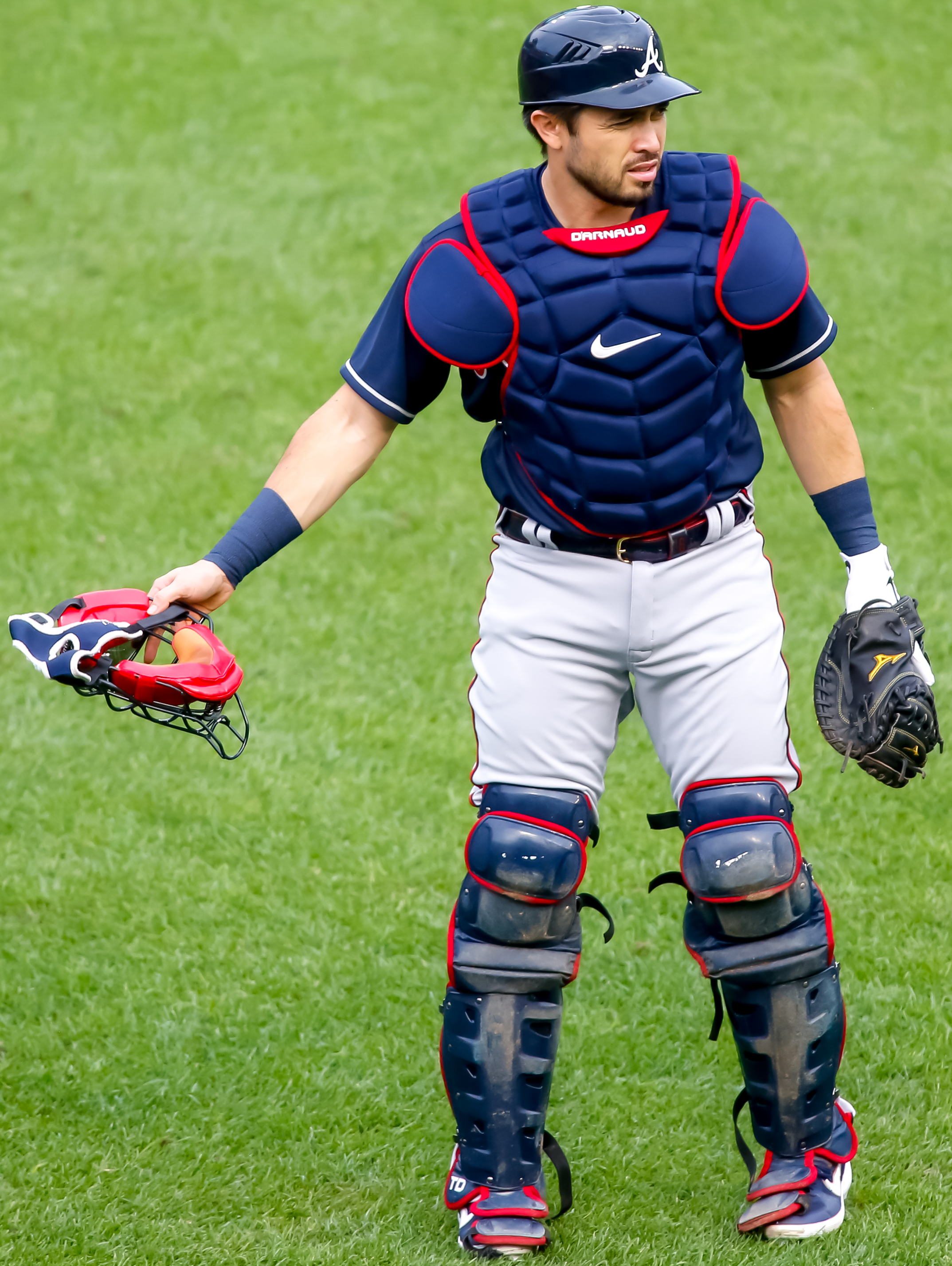
- D'Arnaud with the Atlanta Braves in 2020

Free agent
- Catcher
- Born: February 10, 1989 (age 37); Long Beach, California, U.S.
- Bats: Right Throws: Right

MLB debut
- August 17, 2013, for the New York Mets

MLB statistics (through 2026 season)
- Batting average: .243
- Home runs: 130
- Runs batted in: 462
- Stats at Baseball Reference

Teams
- New York Mets (2013–2019); Los Angeles Dodgers (2019); Tampa Bay Rays (2019); Atlanta Braves (2020–2024); Los Angeles Angels (2025–2026)

Career highlights and awards
- All-Star (2022); World Series champion (2021); Silver Slugger Award (2020)

Travis Emmanuel d'Arnaud (born February 10, 1989) is an American professional baseball catcher who is a free agent. He has played in Major League Baseball (MLB) for the New York Mets, Los Angeles Dodgers, Tampa Bay Rays, Atlanta Braves, and Los Angeles Angels. He made his MLB debut in 2013 with the Mets. D'Arnaud won a Silver Slugger Award in 2020 and was a member of the 2021 World Series champions with the Braves. He was an All-Star in 2022.

== Early life ==
D'Arnaud was born on February 10, 1989, in Long Beach, California. A 2017 article in the Orlando Sentinel article lists numerous family members involved in music: His mother Marita runs an after-school performing-arts center in Long Beach, his father plays trumpet, piano, and trombone, two of his uncles are pianists, and one cousin an electropop musician, among others involved in the field. In addition to music, d'Arnaud described his Long Beach upbringing as having a "huge baseball community". He was a childhood fan of the Los Angeles Dodgers of Major League Baseball (MLB), and modeled his baseball career after Hall of Fame catcher Mike Piazza.

As children, d'Arnaud and his older brother Chase would discuss "how cool that would be if we played with each other or against each other in the big leagues". (Chase went on to spend several years in the big leagues, and the two faced each other several times in their respective careers.) Rather than follow Chase into playing for Los Alamitos High School, d'Arnaud chose to attend Lakewood High School, the rivals of Los Alamitos. D'Arnaud began to draw the attention of scouts as a high school baseball player in 2007, and was invited to work out with the Toronto Blue Jays. D'Arnaud graduated in 2007, and was inducted into the Lakewood Youth Hall of Fame as a Co-Athlete of the Year in 2008.

D'Arnaud had committed to play college baseball for the Pepperdine Waves of Pepperdine University after high school, the same school for which his brother played, but was selected by the Philadelphia Phillies in the supplemental first round of the 2007 Major League Baseball draft, the 37th overall pick. He chose to void his college commitment, and signed a minor league contract for $832,500.

== Professional playing career ==
=== Philadelphia Phillies ===
In 2007, d'Arnaud started his professional career with the Philadelphia Phillies' Rookie League affiliate, the Gulf Coast League Phillies. He played 41 games in the GCL and put together a .241 batting average and a .626 OPS.

In 2008, d'Arnaud began the season with the Phillies' Low–A affiliate, the Williamsport Crosscutters of the New York–Penn League. He played 48 games in the NYPL, hitting .309 with an OPS of .833, and was selected for the mid-season All-Star game. From there he was promoted to the Single-A Lakewood BlueClaws. Between the two teams, he batted .305/.367/.464, while on defense in 58 games he committed 10 errors and was charged with 16 passed balls.

D'Arnaud played the entire 2009 season with the BlueClaws. In 126 games, he batted, .255 and struck 13 home runs, posting an OPS of .738. He was once again selected for the All-Star game, this time in the South Atlantic League. The BlueClaws went on to win the 2009 South Atlantic League championship.

=== Toronto Blue Jays ===
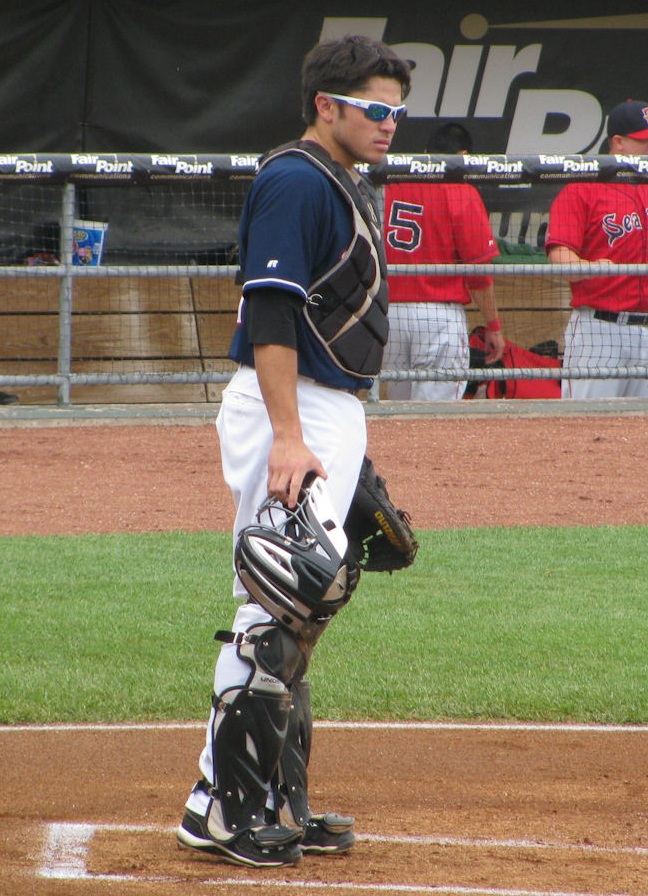
D'Arnaud playing for the New Hampshire Fisher Cats in 2011

On December 16, 2009, d'Arnaud was sent from the Phillies to the Toronto Blue Jays organization in a ten-player trade. The Phillies received Roy Halladay, along with $6 million from the Blue Jays. Toronto received d'Arnaud, Kyle Drabek, and Michael Taylor, who they later flipped to the Oakland Athletics for Brett Wallace. D'Arnaud played the entire 2010 season with the Dunedin Blue Jays, the Blue Jays' High-A affiliate in the Florida State League. Despite suffering from back problems and playing in a higher league, d'Arnaud put up comparable numbers to his 2009 campaign, as he batted .259, struck 6 HRs, and posted an OPS of .726, over 71 games. For the week of April 19, d'Arnaud was named FSL Player of the Week and was selected to participate in the midsummer Home Run Derby. He was named a Mid-Season and Post-Season All-Star.

In 2011, d'Arnaud played the entire 2011 season in the Eastern League, with the Blue Jays Double-A affiliate, the New Hampshire Fisher Cats. Over his first three seasons in the minors, d'Arnaud had steadily improved his defense, but 2011 was the year in which he made vast improvements to all aspects of his offensive ability. He finished the season with a .311 batting average and an OBP of .371 in 114 games. He saw another great spike in power, hitting 21 home runs with a slugging percentage of .542 and 33 doubles. On July 13, d'Arnaud was named to the Eastern League's Mid-Season All-Star team. He also made the post-season team on August 25, going to his sixth All-Star game in total. The following day, on August 26, d'Arnaud was named the EL's Most Valuable Player.

On September 16, the Toronto Blue Jays named d'Arnaud as one of the recipients of the R. Howard Webster award, an award given to the best player at each level of the Blue Jays minor league farm system. The next day, d'Arnaud went on to win his second minor league championship ring, as the New Hampshire Fisher Cats defeated the Reading Phillies 3 games to 1 in the semi-finals and then defeated the Richmond Flying Squirrels 3 games to 1 in the final series of the Eastern League championship.

Baseball America named d'Arnaud as the Best Defensive Catcher in the Eastern League for the 2011 season. They also named him the #2 prospect in the EL, behind highly touted outfield prospect Bryce Harper and in front of teammate Anthony Gose. D'Arnaud was also named the starting catcher for the Double-A level in Baseball America's honorary "classifications" All-Star team.

On September 15, USA Baseball announced that d'Arnaud had been selected for its 25-man roster to play in the IBAF's 2011 Baseball World Cup.

On June 21, d'Arnaud was named to appear in the 2012 All-Star Futures Game.

=== New York Mets ===
==== 2013 ====
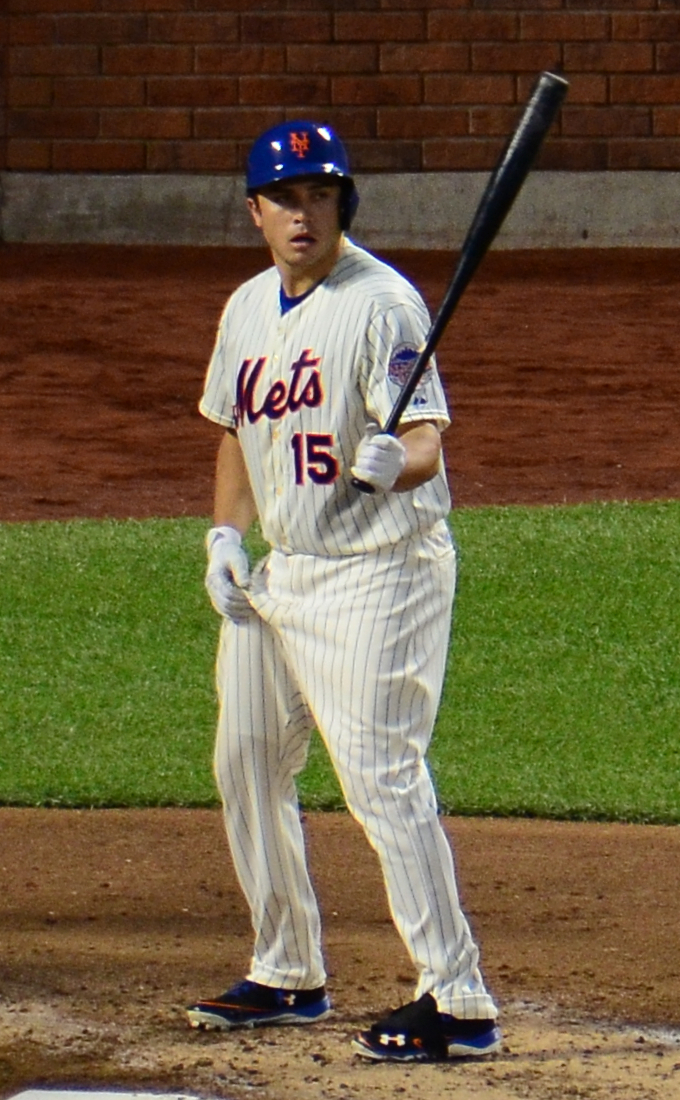
D'Arnaud batting for the New York Mets in 2013

On December 17, 2012, the Blue Jays traded d'Arnaud, Noah Syndergaard, John Buck, and Wuilmer Becerra to the New York Mets for R. A. Dickey, Josh Thole, and Mike Nickeas.

The Mets optioned d'Arnaud to Triple-A Las Vegas 51s on March 24, 2013. He suffered a non-displaced fracture on his left foot during a game on April 17. D'Arnaud was cleared to begin a rehab assignment on June 3; however, he recovered more slowly than originally expected, having been limited to running in a rehab pool as of June 21, while awaiting clearance for land-based running. On July 24, d'Arnaud played in his first rehab game with the GCL Mets, and went 1–3 at the plate. He returned to the Las Vegas 51s on August 9.

The Mets called up d'Arnaud for the first time on August 17, when John Buck was placed on the paternity list. In his first major league plate appearance, d'Arnaud drew a four-pitch walk from San Diego starter Edinson Vólquez. He finished the game 0–2 with two walks. D'Arnaud got his first major league hit on August 20 against Atlanta Braves pitcher Luis Ayala in the 8th inning. He hit his first Major League home run on August 25, a two-run shot off Detroit Tigers pitcher Rick Porcello. The home run earned d'Arnaud a curtain call from the Mets fans.

D'Arnaud finished the season appearing in 31 games batting .202 in 99 at-bats in 112 plate appearances with 20 hits, one home run, five RBIs, 12 walks, four runs scored, and 21 strikeouts.

==== 2014 ====
On May 13, d'Arnaud suffered the third concussion of his professional career, when he was hit by Alfonso Soriano's backswing. On June 8, d'Arnaud was optioned to AAA Las Vegas, having posted a .180 batting average in the major leagues. His spot was taken by Taylor Teagarden. In the 15 games after his demotion, he hit .436 with six home runs. On June 24, d'Arnaud was called back up to the Mets and resumed his role as starting catcher, after Teagarden was placed on the disabled list with a left hamstring strain. On the same day, d'Arnaud hit a three-run home run off Scott Kazmir of the Oakland Athletics with two outs in the bottom of the third inning, increasing the Mets' lead to 7-1, in a game they went on to win by a score of 10-1. It was the only hit for d'Arnaud in 4 at-bats as he struck out twice. For the remainder of the season, d'Arnaud batted .272 with 10 home runs.

D'Arnaud finished the season appearing in 108 games batting .242 in 385 at-bats in 421 plate appearances with 93 hits, 13 home runs, 41 RBIs, 32 walks, 48 runs scored, and 64 strikeouts. On defense, he led the NL in passed balls, with five. He tied for seventh place in the 2014 National League Rookie of the Year Award voting.

==== 2015 ====
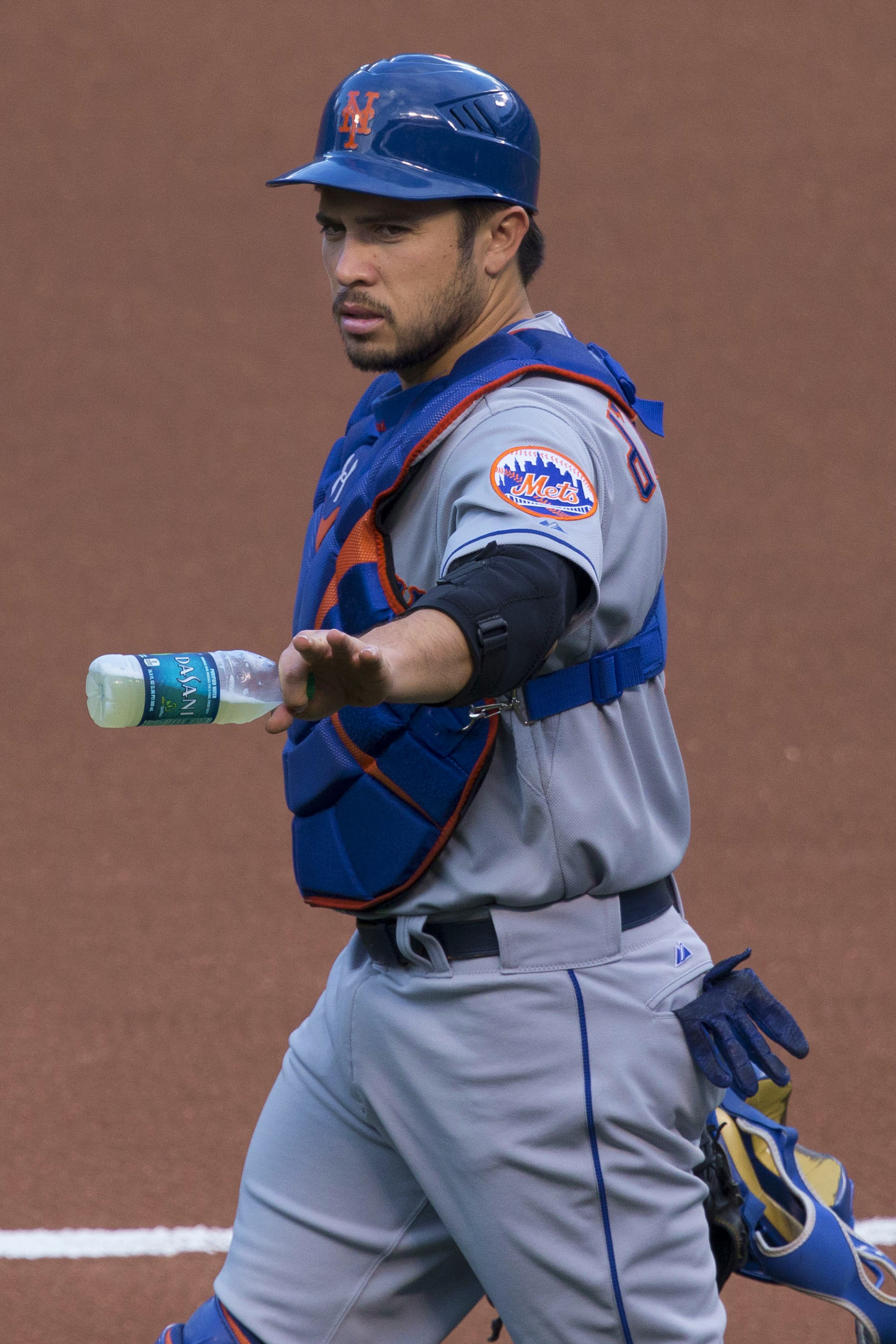
D'Arnaud with the Mets in 2015

In February, d'Arnaud traded uniform numbers with bench coach Bob Geren, exchanging 15 for 7. D'Arnaud broke his hand when he was hit by a pitch on April 19, and was subsequently placed on the 15-day disabled list. His spot on the roster was replaced by fellow catcher Kevin Plawecki. He was reactivated off the disabled list on June 10 when Danny Muno was sent down to the 51s. In a game against the Atlanta Braves in Atlanta on June 20, d'Arnaud left the game in the sixth inning due to an injured elbow. D'Arnaud, who had a two-run single and a solo homer, was hurt trying to tag A. J. Pierzynski, who was trying to score on a sacrifice fly to left. Michael Cuddyer's throw was up the third-base line, and Pierzynski collided with d'Arnaud, who couldn't hold on to the ball. He was re-placed on the disabled list with a sprained left elbow. Catcher Johnny Monell replaced him on the roster. He was brought back on July 30 with Anthony Recker sent down.

Travis finished the season appearing in 67 games batting .268 in 239 at-bats in 268 plate appearances with 64 hits, 12 home runs, 41 RBIs, 23 walks, 31 runs scored, and 49 strikeouts.

D'Arnaud was the starting catcher for every game of the Mets' postseason run, which culminated with a trip to the World Series. In the Division Series against the Los Angeles Dodgers, he batted .158 in 19 at-bats in 20 plate appearances with three hits, one home run, four RBIs, three runs scored, with eight strikeouts, while driving in the winning run in the deciding fifth game. In the Championship Series against the Chicago Cubs, he batted .267 in 15 at-bats in 16 plate appearances with four hits, two home runs, two RBIs, two runs scored, and 5 strikeouts. He batted .143 in 21 at-bats/plate appearances with three hits, one RBI, and four strikeouts against the Kansas City Royals in the World Series.

==== 2016 ====
D'Arnaud began the 2016 season as the Mets' starting catcher, but was injured and replaced by Kevin Plawecki, enabling René Rivera to be activated as backup catcher. After a rehab stint with the St. Lucie Mets and Las Vegas 51s, d'Arnaud was reactivated in June and Plawecki was sent down, with Rivera staying as the backup. On July 5, 2016, d'Arnaud switched his uniform number from 7 to 18 to offer a salute to retired NFL quarterback Peyton Manning, and to give José Reyes the number he had worn his whole MLB career.

==== 2017 ====
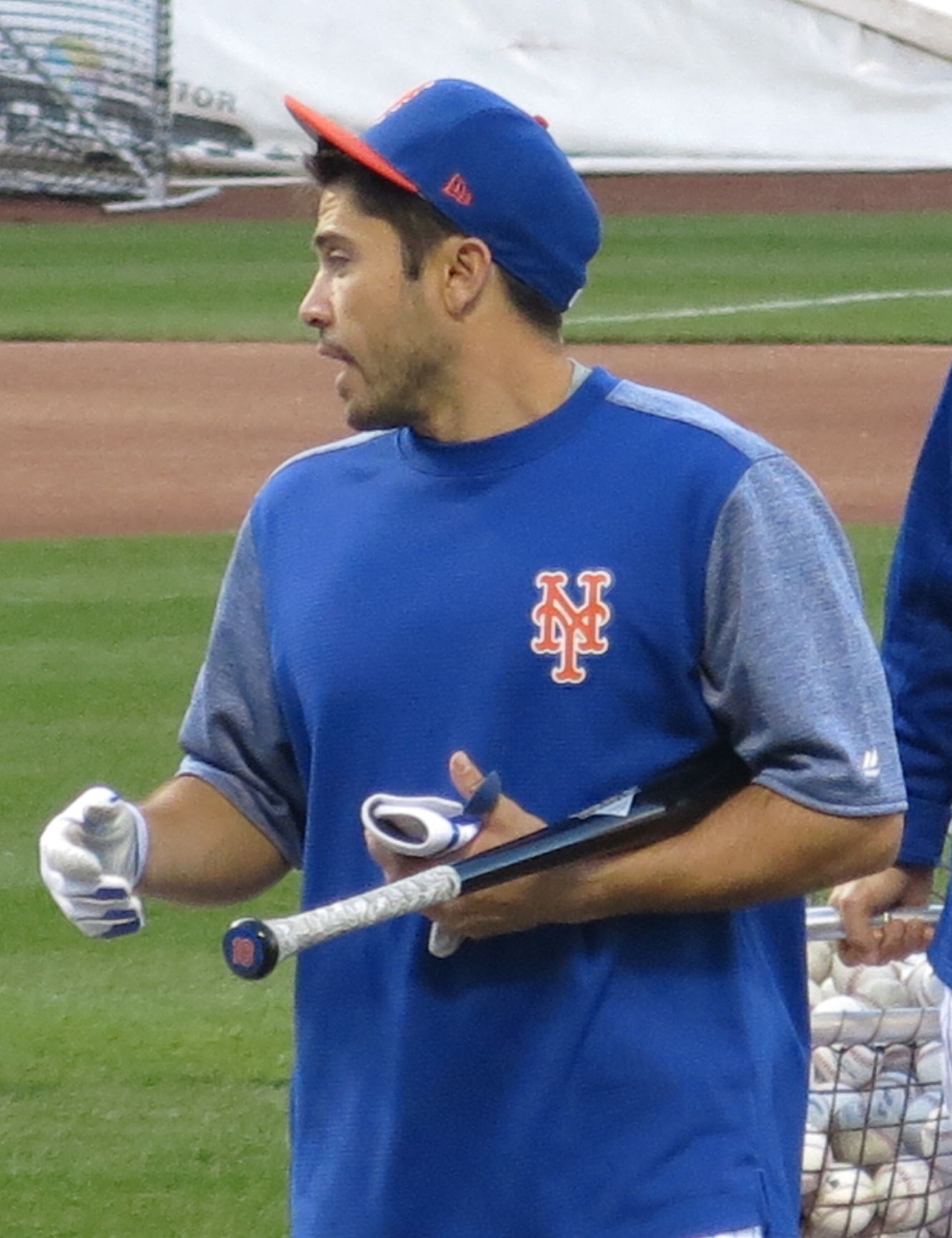
D'Arnaud with the Mets in 2017

On May 5, 2017, d'Arnaud was placed on the 10-day disabled list due to a bruised right wrist. He was activated on May 24. On August 16, following injuries to José Reyes and Wilmer Flores, the Mets started d'Arnaud at third base. Terry Collins chose to move d'Arnaud back and forth between third and second base, swapping him with Asdrúbal Cabrera twelve times, in order to minimize his impact on the defense.

==== 2018 ====
D'Arnaud began the season as the Mets' Opening Day catcher. On April 11, d'Arnaud was placed on the 10-day disabled list due to a partial tear of the UCL in his right elbow. He had Tommy John surgery on April 17. On April 21, he was transferred to the 60-day disabled list.

==== 2019 ====
On April 28, 2019, d'Arnaud was designated for assignment. He was released on May 3.

=== Los Angeles Dodgers ===
On May 5, 2019, d'Arnaud signed a one-year contract with the Los Angeles Dodgers. He appeared in one game for the Dodgers as a pinch hitter.

=== Tampa Bay Rays ===
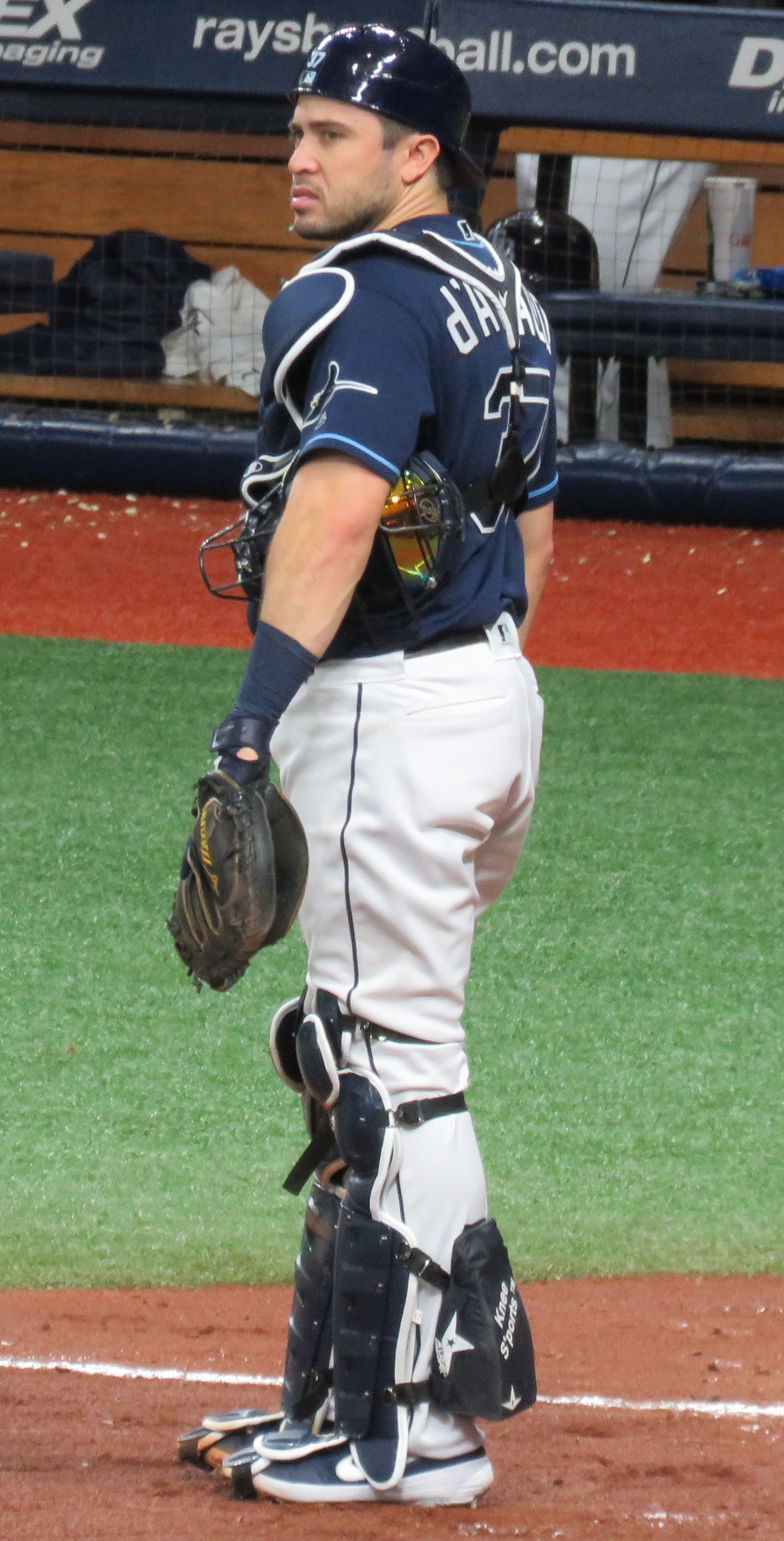
D'Arnaud with the Rays in 2019

On May 10, 2019, the Dodgers traded d'Arnaud to the Tampa Bay Rays in exchange for cash considerations. On July 15, d'Arnaud batted 3-for-3 with two walks and three home runs including a go-ahead three-run home run off of Aroldis Chapman at Yankee Stadium. D'Arnaud became the fifth player in Rays franchise history to hit three home runs in one game. On July 21, d'Arnaud hit his first career grand slam off of Dylan Cease leading the team to a 4–2 win against the Chicago White Sox.

In 2019, with the three teams combined, he batted .251/.312/.433 with 16 home runs and 69 RBIs.

=== Atlanta Braves ===
==== 2020 ====
On November 24, 2019, d'Arnaud signed a two-year contract with the Atlanta Braves worth $16 million. In 2020, at 31 years of age, he had his breakout offensive season. He batted .321/.386/.533 with nine home runs, 34 RBIs, and a WAR of 0.8 in 165 at bats. He was also awarded his first Silver Slugger Award as the best offensive catcher in the National League. On defense, he led the NL in passed balls, with five.

==== 2021 ====
In a May 1, 2021, game against the Toronto Blue Jays, d'Arnaud suffered a left thumb injury after tagging out Blue Jays outfielder Randal Grichuk at home plate. On May 2, d'Arnaud was placed on the 60-day injured list (IL) with a torn a thumb ligament that required surgery. On August 11, 2021, d'Arnaud was activated from the 60 day IL. The Braves and d'Arnaud agreed to an extension on August 20, 2021. The deal was worth $16 million over two years, and included a club option for the 2024 season worth $8 million. In 2021 he batted .220/.284/.388 with 7 home runs, 26 RBIs, and a WAR of 0.2. The Braves finished with an 88–73 record, clinching the NL East, and eventually won the 2021 World Series, giving the Braves their first title since 1995. D'Arnaud hit a solo home run in game 3 of the World Series.

==== 2022 ====
In 2022, d'Arnaud was named to the 2022 Major League Baseball All-Star Game roster as a reserve catcher. Teammate and fellow catcher William Contreras was also named to the All-Star team. The last time two catchers from the same team were named to an All-Star team was in 1962 when Yogi Berra and Elston Howard were named All-Stars for the New York Yankees. He finished the season batting .268/.319/.472 with 18 home runs and 60 RBIs. He had a WAR of 2.9, the highest of his career.

==== 2023 ====
Prior to the start of the 2023 season, the Braves acquired catcher Sean Murphy from the Oakland Athletics. Murphy and d'Arnaud were expected to share the catching and designated hitting duties. On April 8, 2023, d'Arnaud and San Diego Padres infielder Rougned Odor collided at home plate. The collision resulted in d'Arnaud's placement on the 7-day injured list, and the promotion of Chadwick Tromp to the major league roster. On May 8, he was activated from the 7-day injured list. On June 16, d'Arnaud hit his 100th homerun in a two home run game in a win against the Colorado Rockies. On July 18, 2023, d'Arnaud and the Braves agreed to another contract extension worth $8 million for the 2024 season, with an option for the following season, also worth $8 million.

==== 2024 ====
On April 19, 2024, d'Arnaud hit three home runs, including one grand slam, in a win against the Texas Rangers. D'Arnaud became the fourth Braves catcher with three home runs in a game and the third catcher in MLB history to have multiple games with three or more home runs. In 99 games for Atlanta, he slashed .238/.302/.436 with 15 home runs and 48 RBI. On November 4, 2024, the Braves declined d'Arnaud's option for the 2025 season making him a free agent.

=== Los Angeles Angels ===
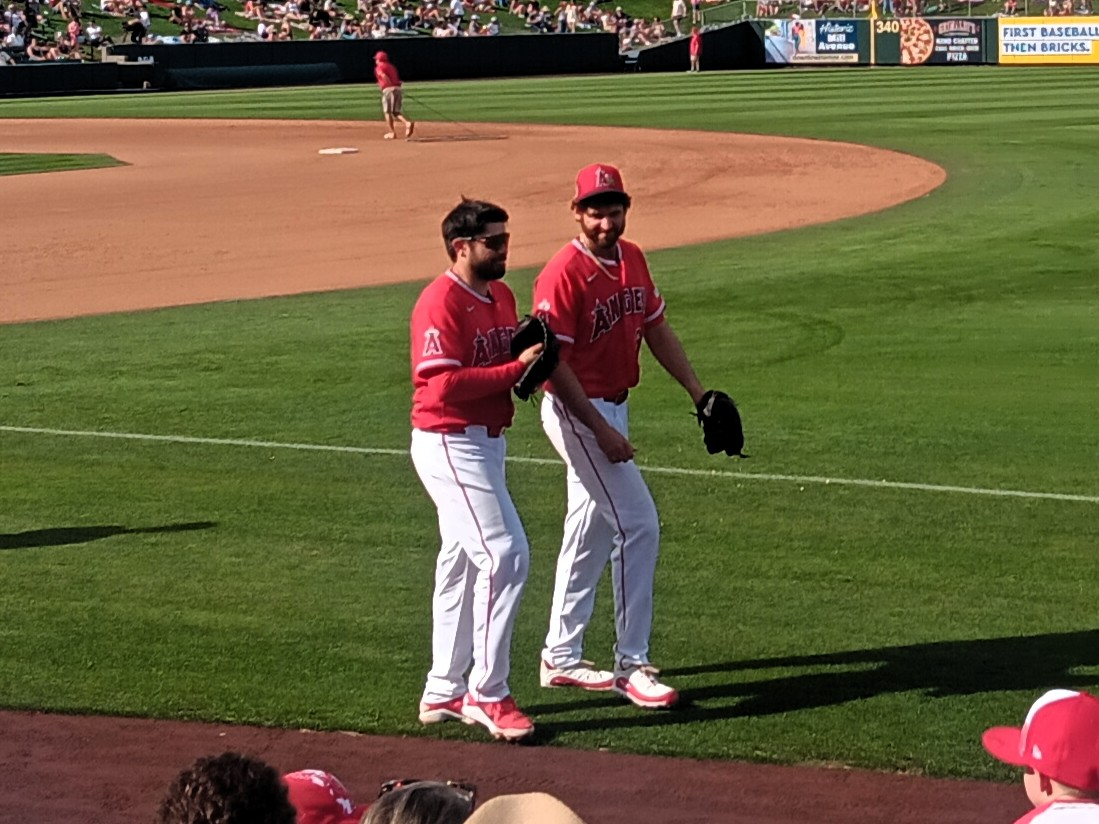
d'Arnaud (left) speaks with Jordan Romano during 2026 Spring Training with the Angels

On November 12, 2024, d'Arnaud signed a two-year, $12 million contract with the Los Angeles Angels. He made 69 appearances for Los Angeles during the 2025 season, batting .197/.255/.343 with six home runs and 21 RBI.

On May 8, 2026, d'Arnaud was placed on the injured list due to right foot plantar fasciitis. He was transferred to the 60-day injured list on June 3, and was assigned to play for the Salt Lake Bees on July 18. On July 29, d'Arnaud was activated off of the injured list.

== Baseball academy ==
In 2024, d'Arnaud and his older brother, former major leaguer Chase d'Arnaud, opened a baseball academy in their hometown of Long Beach, California.

== Personal life ==
D'Arnaud is the son of Lance and Marita d'Arnaud. He is of partial Filipino descent on his mother's side. His older brother, Chase d'Arnaud, was a Major League Baseball player from 2011 to 2018.

In November 2017, d'Arnaud married Britney Cobian at a location near Lake Tahoe. They have three children, born in November 2018, August 2021, and September 2024.

== Career accomplishments ==
- 2022 National League All-Star
- 2021 World Series Champion
- 2020 NL silver slugger award winner
- 2011 Team USA – Baseball World Cup
- 2011 Baseball America Classification All-Star
- 2011 Baseball America #2 Prospect – Eastern League
- 2011 Baseball America Best Defensive Catcher – Eastern League
- 2011 R. Howard Webster Award
- 2011 Eastern League Champion
- 2011 Eastern League MVP
- 2011 Eastern League All-Star
- 2011 Eastern League Mid-Season All-Star
- 2010 Florida State League All-Star
- 2010 Florida State League Mid-Season All-Star
- 2010 Florida State League Home Run Derby Participant
- 2010 Florida State League Player of the Week (4/19)
- 2009 South Atlantic League Champion
- 2009 South Atlantic League Mid-Season All-Star
- 2008 New York–Penn League Mid-Season All-Star
