= Chase d'Arnaud =

American baseball player (born 1987)

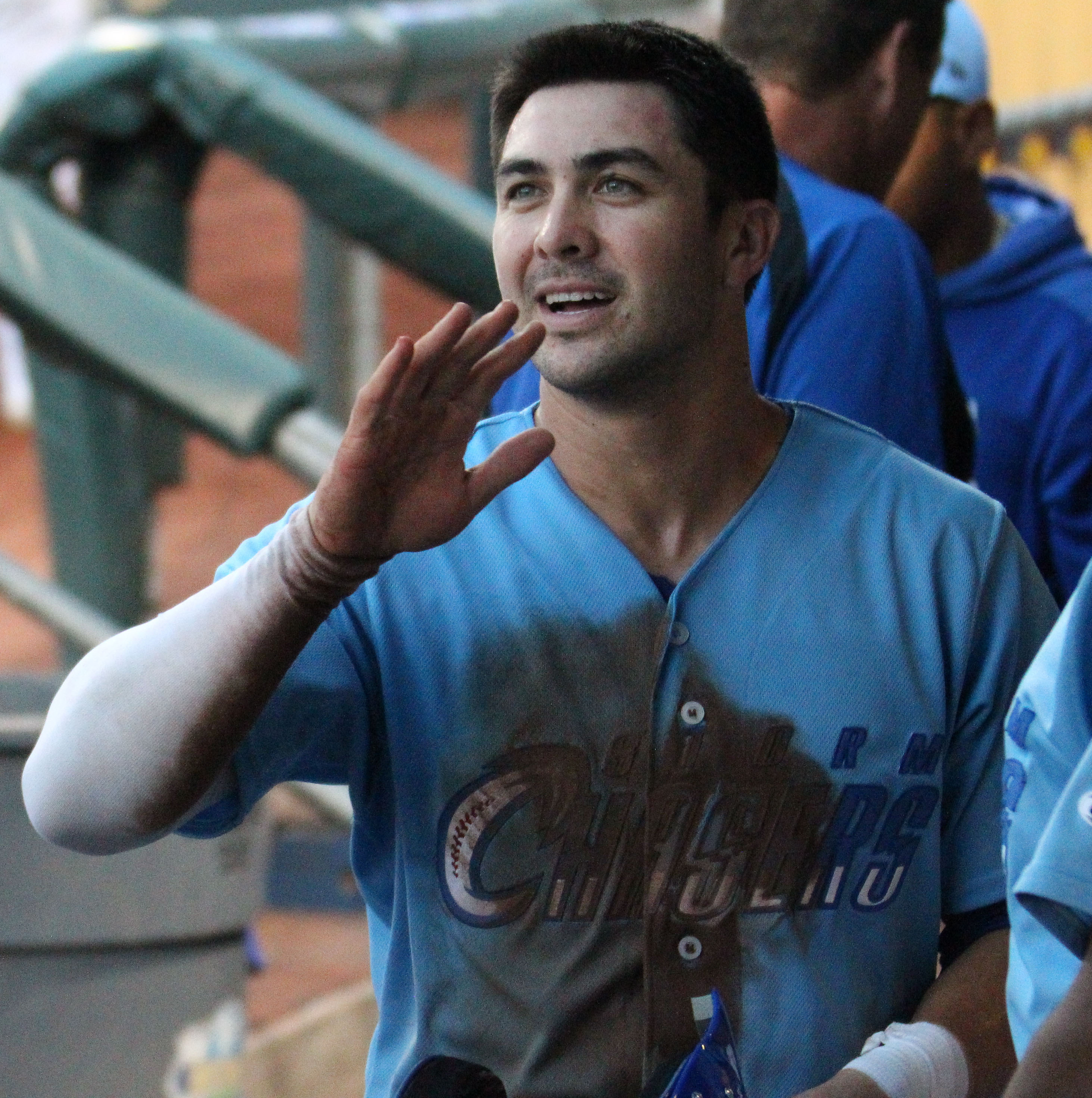
- D'Arnaud with the Omaha Storm Chasers in 2019
- Infielder / Outfielder
- Born: January 21, 1987 (age 39); Torrance, California, U.S.
- Batted: Right Threw: Right

MLB debut
- June 24, 2011, for the Pittsburgh Pirates

Last MLB appearance
- September 30, 2018, for the San Francisco Giants

MLB statistics
- Batting average: .222
- Home runs: 5
- Runs batted in: 40
- Stats at Baseball Reference

Teams
- Pittsburgh Pirates (2011–2012, 2014); Philadelphia Phillies (2015); Atlanta Braves (2016–2017); Boston Red Sox (2017); San Diego Padres (2017); San Francisco Giants (2018)

Chase Jonathan d'Arnaud (born January 21, 1987), is an American former professional baseball utility player. He played in Major League Baseball (MLB) for the Pittsburgh Pirates, Philadelphia Phillies, Atlanta Braves, Boston Red Sox, San Diego Padres, and San Francisco Giants.

== High school and college ==
D'Arnaud graduated from Los Alamitos High School in 2005. He was drafted by the Los Angeles Dodgers in the 44th Round of the 2005 MLB draft, but he chose to attend Pepperdine University. He played for the Anchorage Glacier Pilots of the Alaska Baseball League in summer 2006 and he played with the Orleans Cardinals in the Cape Cod Baseball League during summer 2007. He was drafted by the Pittsburgh Pirates in the 4th Round of the 2008 MLB draft.

== Professional baseball career ==
d'Arnaud played seven seasons in the major leagues with a batting average of .222. He never won any awards but did appear in the 2011 Futures Game.

=== Pittsburgh Pirates ===
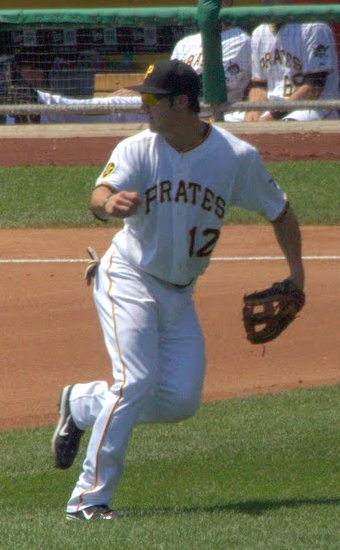
D'Arnaud with the Pirates in 2011

D'Arnaud made his professional baseball debut in 2008, playing for the State College Spikes. In 2009, he played for the West Virginia Power and the Lynchburg Hillcats. In 2010, he played for the Altoona Curve.

In 2011, d'Arnaud was playing for the Indianapolis Indians when he was called up to the majors by the Pittsburgh Pirates for the first time on June 24. In his major league debut, he recorded his first major league hit, a triple, off Boston Red Sox pitcher Jon Lester. D'Arnaud appeared in 48 games for the Pirates in 2011, batting .217, with six runs batted in and 12 stolen bases.

In 2012, d'Arnaud played 98 games for Indianapolis, batting .252 with 34 stolen bases. He was recalled by the Pirates on September 10, 2012. He played eight games for the Pirates in 2012, scoring a pair of runs and getting a stolen base.

On March 20, 2013, the Pirates placed d'Arnaud on the 60-day disabled list after surgery to repair a partially torn ligament in his left thumb. D'Arnaud started a rehab assignment with the Bradenton Marauders on May 16. On May 18, his rehab assignment was transferred to the Altoona Curve, and then to the Indianapolis Indians on May 25. He was activated from the disabled list and optioned to Indianapolis on May 31, where he played the rest of the season.

D'Arnaud was designated for assignment on February 24, 2014 when Brent Morel was claimed on waivers from the Toronto Blue Jays. He spent the season with Indianapolis, and his contract was selected by the Pirates on September 2 after the rosters expanded. He appeared in eight games for the Pirates in 2014, and was used as a pinch runner and defensive replacement.

On November 3, he was outrighted to Indianapolis and elected free agency.

=== Philadelphia Phillies ===
On November 13, 2014, d'Arnaud signed a minor league contract with the Philadelphia Phillies. He was assigned to the Triple-A Lehigh Valley IronPigs to begin the 2015 season. On September 14, 2015, the Phillies selected d'Arnaud's contract, adding him to their active roster. In 11 games for Philadelphia, he went 3-for-17 (.176) with 1 walk. On October 7, d'Arnaud was removed from the 40-man roster and sent outright to Triple-A Lehigh Valley.

=== Atlanta Braves ===
On November 24, 2015, d'Arnaud signed a minor league contract with the Atlanta Braves. He made 84 appearances for the Braves during the 2016 season, slashing .245/.317/.335 with one home run, 21 RBI, and nine stolen bases.

D'Arnaud played in 11 games for Atlanta in 2017, going 3–for–8 (.375) with two walks. He was designated for assignment by the Braves on April 25, 2017.

=== Boston Red Sox ===
On April 27, 2017, d'Arnaud was claimed off waivers by the Boston Red Sox. In two appearances for Boston, d'Arnaud scored twice and singled in his only at–bat. He was designated for assignment by Boston on May 18.

=== San Diego Padres ===
On May 21, 2017, d'Arnaud was claimed off waivers by the San Diego Padres. In 22 appearances for San Diego, he batted .143/.177/.245 with one home run, three RBI, and five stolen bases.

=== San Francisco Giants ===
D'Arnaud signed a minor league contract with the San Francisco Giants on January 4, 2018. His contract was selected from the Triple-A Sacramento River Cats on July 7. In 42 games for San Francisco, d'Arnaud hit .215/.253/.366 with three home runs and nine RBI. On October 23, he was removed from the 40-man roster and sent outright to Sacramento.

=== Texas Rangers ===
On December 17, 2018, d'Arnaud signed a minor league contract with the Texas Rangers. He was assigned to the Triple-A Nashville Sounds to open the 2019 season. He was released on June 18.

=== Kansas City Royals ===
On June 21, 2019, d’Arnaud signed a minor league contract with the Kansas City Royals organization. In 47 games for the Triple-A Omaha Storm Chasers, he hit .266/.333/.402 with four home runs, 17 RBI, and seven stolen bases. d'Arnaud elected free agency following the season on November 4.

On February 17, 2020, d’Arnaud announced his retirement from baseball via Instagram.

Shortly after his retirement, d'Arnaud made himself available to play for the Philippines in the 2021 World Baseball Classic qualifiers, scheduled to be held in Tucson, Arizona from March 20 to 25, 2020. His mother's family includes Filipino heritage. However, those qualifiers and the 2021 tournament were postponed due to the COVID-19 pandemic, and the Philippines did not compete in subsequent qualifiers.

== Personal ==
D'Arnaud's younger brother Travis is a catcher for the Los Angeles Angels.

D'Arnaud and his wife married in 2016. They have three sons together.

D'Arnaud is also known for his musical pursuits, and is the lead singer of the Chase d'Arnaud Band. In 2016, they performed at Bonnaroo Music Festival.

D'Arnaud was a coach for the Croatia national team at the 2025 European Baseball Championships in Antwerp, Belgium and Rotterdam, the Netherlands, where the team finished 8th out of 12 teams. He coached alongside three other former Pepperdine players.
