= Mike Kearney =

Scottish footballer

Personal information
- Date of birth: 18 February 1953 (age 73)
- Place of birth: Glasgow, Scotland
- Height: 6 ft 0 in (1.83 m)
- Position: Forward

Youth career
- Petershill

Senior career*
Years	Team	Apps	(Gls)
1972–1976	Shrewsbury Town	149	(41)
1976–1978	Chester	38	(5)
1978–1980	Reading	87	(24)
1980	Chester	9	(0)
1980–1983	Reading	58	(12)
- Basingstoke Town
Total		341	(82)
- * Club domestic league appearances and goals

Mike Kearney (born 18 February 1953) is a Scottish retired professional footballer who played as a forward in the Football League for Shrewsbury Town, Chester and Reading.
