= John Buck (baseball) =

American baseball player (born 1980)

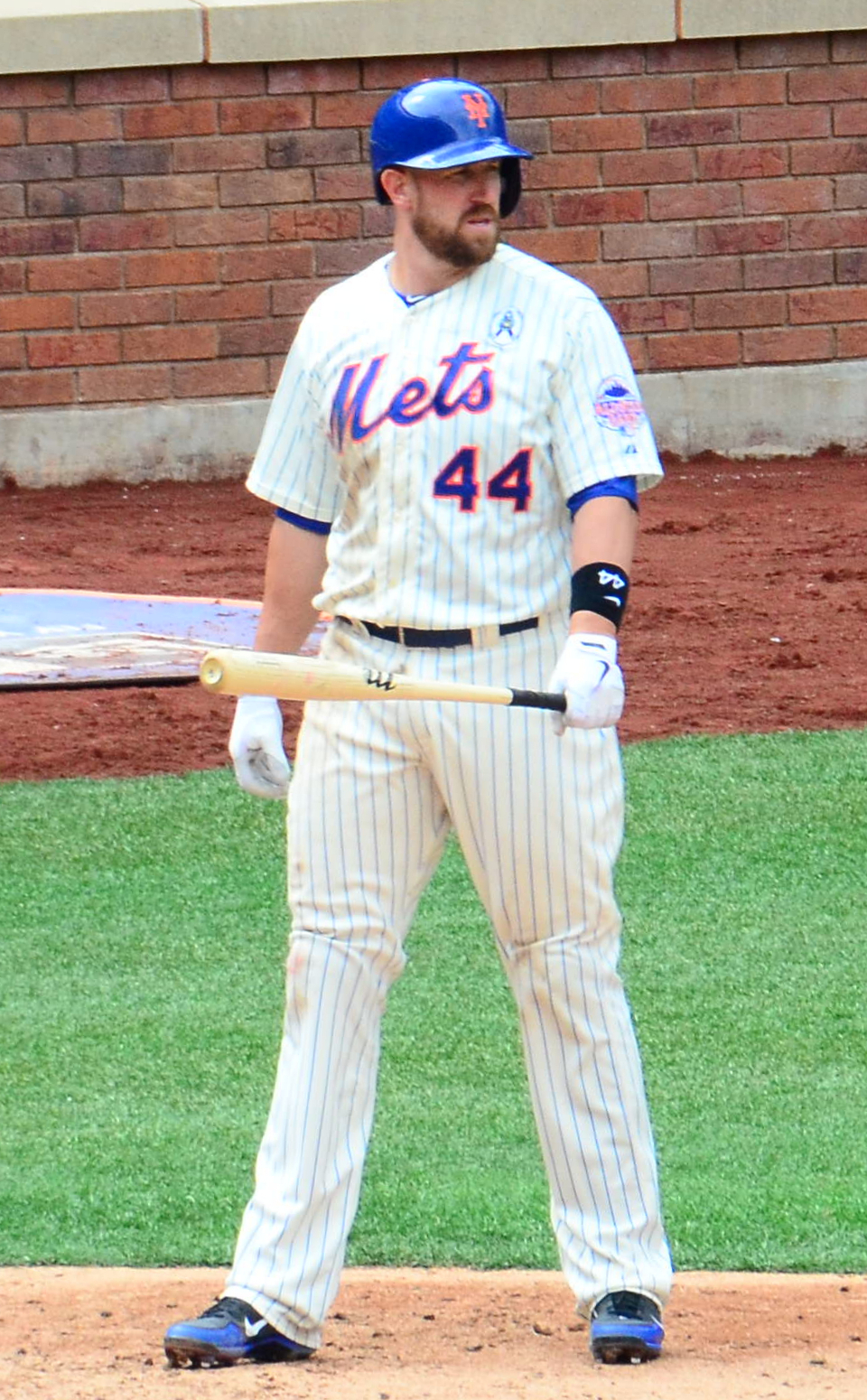
- Buck with the New York Mets in 2013
- Catcher
- Born: July 7, 1980 (age 46); Kemmerer, Wyoming, U.S.
- Batted: Right Threw: Right

MLB debut
- June 25, 2004, for the Kansas City Royals

Last MLB appearance
- September 28, 2014, for the Los Angeles Angels of Anaheim

MLB statistics
- Batting average: .234
- Home runs: 134
- Runs batted in: 491
- Stats at Baseball Reference

Teams
- Kansas City Royals (2004–2009); Toronto Blue Jays (2010); Florida / Miami Marlins (2011–2012); New York Mets (2013); Pittsburgh Pirates (2013); Seattle Mariners (2014); Los Angeles Angels of Anaheim (2014)

Career highlights and awards
- All-Star (2010)

Johnathan Richard Buck (born July 7, 1980) is an American former professional baseball catcher. He played in Major League Baseball (MLB) for the Kansas City Royals, Toronto Blue Jays, Florida/Miami Marlins, New York Mets, Pittsburgh Pirates, Seattle Mariners and Los Angeles Angels of Anaheim. He went to high school in Taylorsville, Utah.

== Career ==
=== Houston Astros ===
Buck was initially drafted by the Houston Astros in the 7th round of the 1998 Amateur draft. He was signed to a minor league contract on June 11, 1998.

By 2002, Buck was highly regarded for his defensive ability, becoming one of the game's top minor league catchers and 68th top prospect in all of baseball. In 2003, Buck moved farther up prospect lists. He was listed as the 21st-best prospect in baseball by John Sickels.

=== Kansas City Royals ===
On June 24, 2004, the Astros traded him to the Kansas City Royals as part of a three-way deal to acquire Carlos Beltrán, sending Buck and cash to Kansas City and Octavio Dotel to the Oakland Athletics. Mark Teahen and Mike Wood went from the Athletics to the Royals as well. The Royals immediately put Buck in their starting lineup, replacing injured veteran Benito Santiago. Buck made his major league debut on June 25. Although he initially appeared overmatched by major league pitching, his batting average reached a low of .138 on July 7. Buck impressed the team with his defensive ability and his handling of pitchers. His hitting improved with time, and by September 25 he had raised his average to .243 with 12 home runs, and 30 RBIs.

In 2006, Buck fought with teammate Runelvys Hernández in the Royals dugout during a game against the Cleveland Indians.

=== Toronto Blue Jays ===
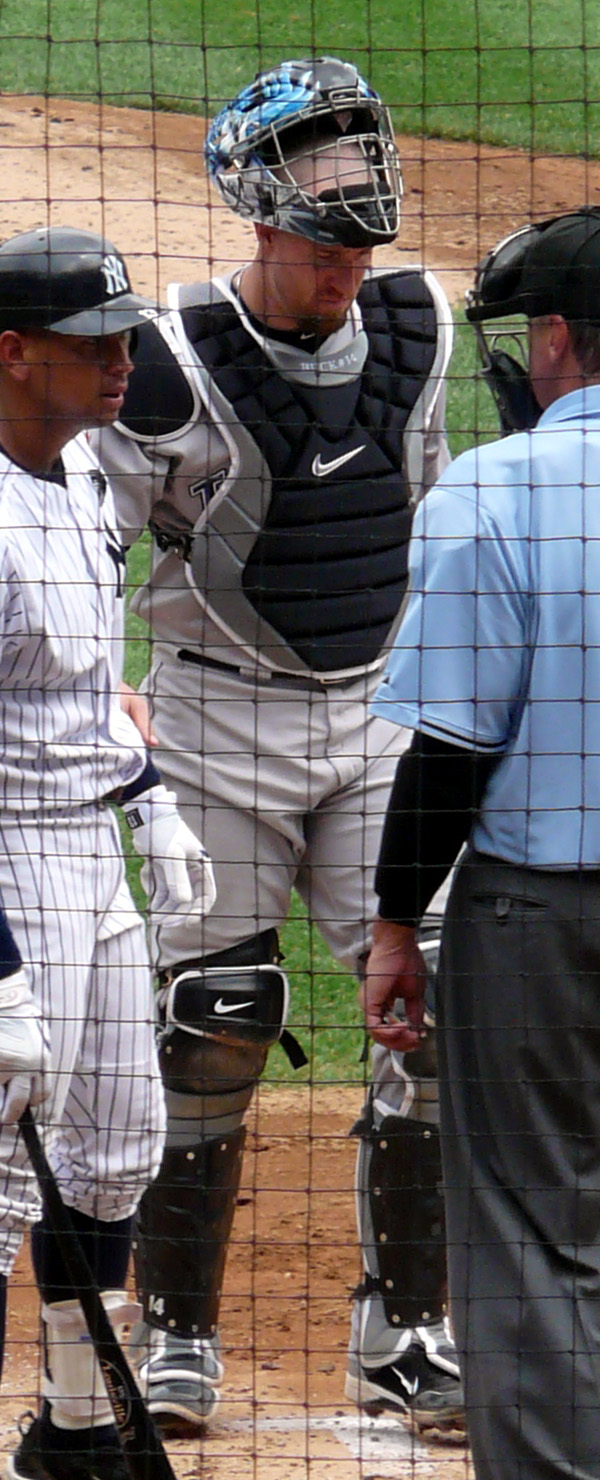
Buck with the Toronto Blue Jays in 2010

On December 16, 2009, Buck signed a one-year contract with the Toronto Blue Jays worth $2 million. On April 29, 2010. Buck hit 3 home runs in a single game against the Oakland Athletics. Buck was elected to the 2010 American League All-Star team on July 4, along with fellow Blue Jays Vernon Wells and José Bautista. In his first All-Star Game, he went 1–2 with a double. Buck finished his only season in Toronto with career-highs in batting average (.281), hits (115), home runs (20), RBI (66), doubles (25), slugging percentage (.489), and on-base plus slugging (.802).

=== Florida/Miami Marlins ===
Buck agreed to a three-year contract with the Florida Marlins worth $18 million on November 15, 2010. The deal was confirmed on November 17. In his first game with the Marlins, he hit a grand slam off New York Mets pitcher Mike Pelfrey.

In 2011, he had the lowest percentage of runners caught stealing of all major league catchers, at 17%.

In 2012, Buck hit .192/.297/.347 with 12 home runs and 41 RBI in 106 games while throwing out 27% of runners.

=== New York Mets ===
On November 19, 2012, Buck was traded to the Toronto Blue Jays along with Josh Johnson, José Reyes, Mark Buehrle, and Emilio Bonifácio in exchange for Jeff Mathis, Adeiny Hechavarria, Henderson Álvarez, Yunel Escobar, Jake Marisnick, Anthony DeSclafani, and Justin Nicolino. On December 17, the Blue Jays traded him, Noah Syndergaard, Travis d'Arnaud, and Wuilmer Becerra to the New York Mets for R. A. Dickey, Josh Thole, and Mike Nickeas.

Buck began 2013 as the starting catcher, with Anthony Recker as his backup. After a great April in which he hit .241/.269/.575 with 9 home runs and 25 RBI, Buck cooled down some. On August 17, Buck was placed on paternity leave, and he was replaced on the roster by the catcher he was traded with, Travis d'Arnaud. d'Arnaud took the starting role when Buck returned, and Buck would soon be traded.

=== Pittsburgh Pirates ===
On August 27, 2013, Buck and Marlon Byrd were traded to the Pittsburgh Pirates in exchange for infield prospect Dilson Herrera and a player to be named later, identified on August 29 as Vic Black. He finished the season as the backup to Russell Martin. In 110 games total (9 with Pittsburgh), he hit .219/.285/.362 with 15 home runs and 62 RBI.

=== Seattle Mariners ===
On January 14, 2014, Buck agreed to a 1-year, $1 million deal with the Seattle Mariners. He was projected to split time at catcher with Humberto Quintero and Mike Zunino. On July 7, Buck's 34th birthday, the Mariners designated him for assignment. After clearing waivers unclaimed, Buck became a free agent.

=== Los Angeles Angels of Anaheim ===
Buck signed a minor league contract with the Los Angeles Angels of Anaheim on July 21, 2014. He was assigned to the Triple-A Salt Lake Bees. The Angels designated Buck for assignment on October 7, after claiming Alfredo Marte and Roger Kieschnick on waivers. He rejected an assignment to Triple-A, becoming a free agent.

=== Retirement ===
In January 2015, Buck agreed to a minor league contract with the Atlanta Braves. The contract included an invitation to major-league spring training. Buck was expected to start the 2015 season at Triple-A. However, on March 26, he announced that he was retiring from professional baseball.

== Personal life ==
Buck's wife Brooke gave birth to twins twelve weeks prematurely in May 2008. The twins' names are Cooper and Brody. In August 2013, his wife gave birth to their third son, Bentley.

In December 2011, Buck assisted in rescuing two elderly women from an overturned car in Sunrise, Florida.

By 2025, Buck would found a mental health training business that utilized sports training techniques to assist first responders with dealing with work-related stress.
