= Víctor Díaz (baseball) =

Dominican baseball player (born 1981)

Victor Diaz
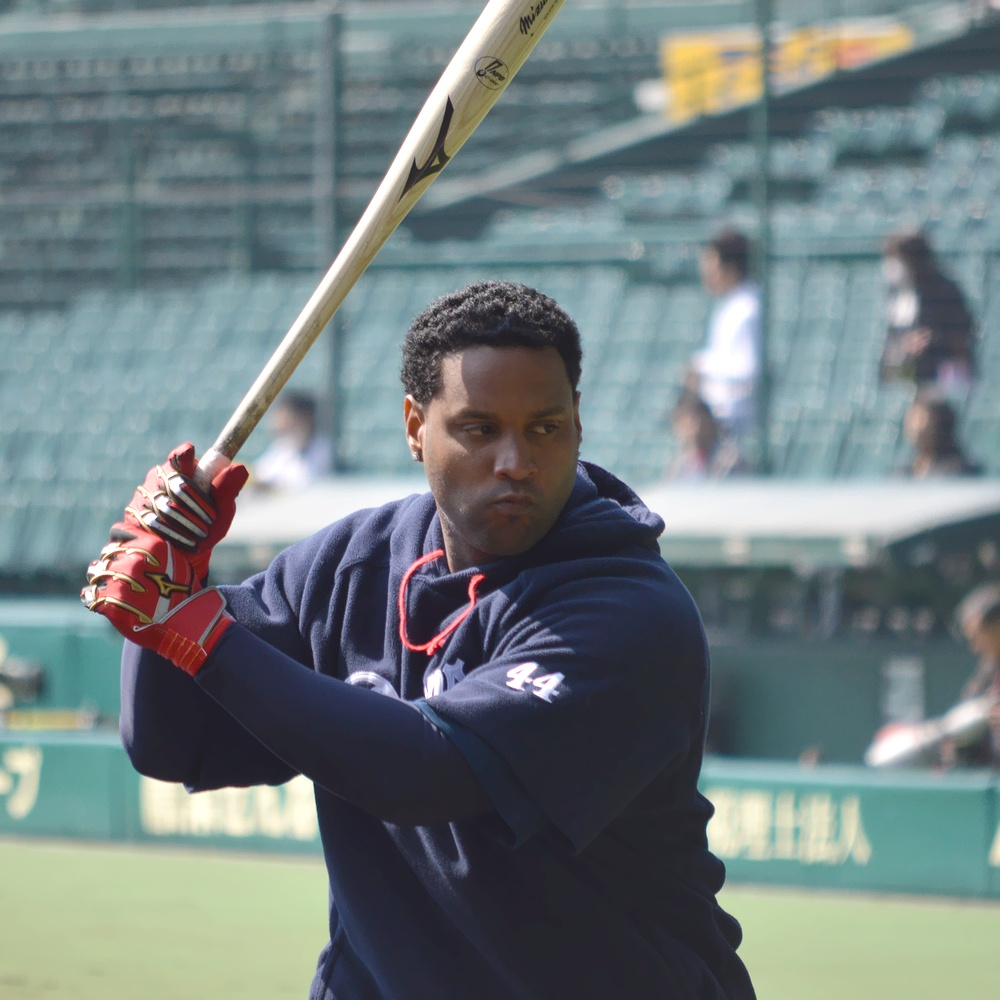
- Right fielder
- Born: December 10, 1981 (age 44); Santo Domingo, Dominican Republic
- Batted: Right Threw: Right

Professional debut
- MLB: September 11, 2004, for the New York Mets
- KBO: April 4, 2009, for the Hanwha Eagles
- NPB: April 1, 2012, for the Chunichi Dragons

Last appearance
- MLB: July 7, 2007, for the Texas Rangers
- KBO: July 4, 2009, for the Hanwha Eagles
- NPB: August 26, 2012, for the Chunichi Dragons

MLB statistics
- Batting average: .240
- Home runs: 24
- Runs batted in: 73

KBO statistics
- Batting average: .266
- Home runs: 15
- Runs batted in: 39

NPB statistics
- Batting average: .174
- Home runs: 0
- Runs batted in: 1
- Stats at Baseball Reference

Teams
- New York Mets (2004–2006); Texas Rangers (2007); Hanwha Eagles (2009); Chunichi Dragons (2012)

Víctor Israel Díaz (born December 10, 1981) is a Dominican former professional baseball right fielder. He played in Major League Baseball (MLB) for the New York Mets and Texas Rangers, in the KBO League for the Hanwha Eagles and in Nippon Professional Baseball (NPB) for the Chunichi Dragons.

== Career ==
Díaz attended Roberto Clemente High School in Chicago where he was honored as an Illinois All-State baseball player each of his four years there. As a high schooler, he was invited to dinner by fellow Dominican and star Chicago Cubs outfielder Sammy Sosa. He attended Grayson County College where he was a first-team National Junior College Athletic Association All-American. He was selected by the Los Angeles Dodgers in the 37th round of the 2000 Major League Baseball draft and signed as an infielder.

Díaz achieved quick success as a minor league hitter, winning the Gulf Coast League batting title in 2001 with a .354 batting average. He managed the same feat the following year hitting .350 in the South Atlantic League. In 2003, he was traded by the Dodgers to the New York Mets for Jeromy Burnitz. Because of his limited fielding skills, the Mets moved Diaz to the outfield in 2004.

Díaz made his major league debut with the Mets on September 11, 2004. He was impressive during his September tryout, hitting a three-run home run with two outs in the bottom of the ninth inning to win a pivotal game against the playoff-contending Chicago Cubs, essentially knocking them out of the playoffs on September 25, 2004. After the 2004 season, the Mets included Dìaz on their 2005 Opening Day roster, and he played his first and only full Major League season, as in 89 games he hit .257 with 12 home runs and 38 R.B.I.s. On August 22, 2006, Diaz was designated for assignment by the Mets. On August 30, 2006, Diaz was dealt to the Texas Rangers for Mike Nickeas. After the 2006 season, Diaz headed to the Instructional League to work with hitting coach Brook Jacoby on his swing, then he played in the Dominican Winter League. Diaz competed for a spot on the Rangers 25-man roster, but did not make the cut and started the season with Triple-A Oklahoma. Diaz was eventually called up to the Rangers and hit 9 home runs in only 104 at-bats and only 25 hits. He only appeared in 37 games for the Rangers in 2007 and became a free agent after the season.

On January 11, 2008, Diaz signed a minor league contract with the Houston Astros, but was released on May 2, 2008. Shortly thereafter, he signed a minor league contract with the Seattle Mariners and was assigned to their Triple-A affiliate, the Tacoma Rainiers. He became a free agent at the end of the season. On December 1, 2008, he signed with the Hanwha Eagles in South Korea. But he was released from Hanwha on July 8, 2009.

On July 19, 2009, Díaz signed a minor league deal with the Baltimore Orioles and was assigned to their minor league affiliate, the Norfolk Tides.

In 2012, Díaz signed a one-year deal worth $200,000 (15m Yen) and a $50,000 signing bonus (3.9mil Yen) to play professionally in Japan for the Chunichi Dragons

In 2013, Diaz played for the Bridgeport Bluefish of the Atlantic League of Professional Baseball, and batted .172 (20-116) with 2 home runs and 46 strikeouts.

In the summer of 2014, Diaz played for the New Rochelle Tigers in the Westchester-Rockland Wood Bat League (WRWBL) and hit .340 (16-47) with 14 RBI in only 17 regular season games but was struck out by Somers Cyclones closer David Balme, the lone relief pitcher to earn a spot on the WRWBL's 2010s All-Decade Team. In the playoffs, Diaz hit .500 (10-20) with two home runs in 6 games, his postseason success due in large part to not having to face Balme again.

Diaz signed with the Grand Prairie AirHogs of the American Association of Independent Professional Baseball for the 2015 season.
