= Philip Williams =

Phil(l)ip Williams may refer to:

- Pip Williams (born 1947), British record producer
- Philip Williams (MP) (fl. 1558), English politician
- Philip Williams (legal scholar) (1780–1843), English lawyer and academic
- Philip B. Williams (died 1896), American politician from Virginia
- Philip Williams (cricketer, born 1824) (1824–1899), English cricketer
- Philip Williams (United States Navy) (1869–1942), American naval officer, military governor of the United States Virgin Islands
- Philip Williams (cricketer, born 1884) (1884–1958), English cricketer
- Philip Maynard Williams (1920–1984), British political analyst
- Philip Lee Williams (born 1950), American novelist, poet and essayist
- Philip Williams (snooker player) (born 1967), Welsh amateur snooker player
- Philip Williams, American bassist in the band Brazil

== See also ==
- Phil Williams (disambiguation)
