= 1976–77 Welsh Cup =

Tournament details
- Country: Wales

Final positions
- Champions: (England) Shrewsbury Town
- Runners-up: (Wales) Cardiff City

The 1976–77 FAW Welsh Cup is the 90th season of the annual knockout tournament for competitive football teams in Wales.

== Key ==
League name pointed after clubs name.

- CCL - Cheshire County League
- FL D2 - Football League Second Division
- FL D3 - Football League Third Division
- FL D4 - Football League Fourth Division
- NPL - Northern Premier League
- SFL - Southern Football League
- WLN - Welsh League North
- WLS - Welsh League South

== Fourth round ==
Nine winners from the Third round and seven new clubs.

Tie no	Home	Score	Away
1	Shrewsbury Town(FL D3)	3–3	Chester (FL D3)
replay	Chester (FL D3)	1–2	Shrewsbury Town (FL D3)

== Semifinal ==
Tie no	Home	Score	Away
1	Bridgend Town (WLS)	1–2	Cardiff City (FL D2)
2	Wrexham (FL D3)	1–1	Shrewsbury Town (FL D3)
replay	Shrewsbury Town (FL D3)	4–1	Wrexham (FL D3)

== Final ==
Tie no	Home	Score	Away
1	Cardiff City (FL D2)	2–1	Shrewsbury Town (FL D3)
1	Shrewsbury Town (FL D3)	3–0	Cardiff City (FL D2)
