= Ian Edwards (footballer, born 1955) =

Welsh footballer

Personal information
- Full name: Robert Ian Edwards
- Date of birth: 30 January 1955 (age 71)
- Place of birth: Rossett, Wales
- Position: Striker

Senior career*
Years	Team	Apps	(Gls)
1971–1973	Rhyl		
1973–1976	West Bromwich Albion	16	(3)
1976–1979	Chester	104	(36)
1979–1982	Wrexham	76	(20)
1982–1983	Crystal Palace	18	(4)
1983–198?	Mold Alexandra		
- Porthmadog

International career
1977–1980	Wales	4	(4)
1977–1978	Wales U-21	2	(0)

Managerial career
- 1994–1995: Porthmadog
- * Club domestic league appearances and goals

Robert Ian Edwards (born 30 January 1955) is a Welsh former footballer who played as a forward. He was capped by Wales and played in The Football League for four clubs.

== Playing career ==
Born in Rossett, Edwards began his playing days with non-league side Rhyl, before joining West Bromwich Albion in February 1973. He marked his league debut two years later by scoring in a 4–0 win over Sheffield Wednesday. But he found first-team opportunities at West Brom limited and in November 1976 he joined Chester for £18,000. A debut goal against Northampton Town followed and Edwards went on to score a hat-trick in the club's 4–0 win at Southend United and a last minute winner against Luton Town as Chester reached the FA Cup fifth round. Unfortunately he was injured scoring against Rotherham United in March 1977, with a knee injury that was to have lasting repercussions for the player.

The 1978–79 season saw Edwards back in regular action, scoring in a Football League Cup giantkilling win over Coventry City. In October 1978, Edwards made history by becoming only the fourth player to score four times for Wales in a 7–0 win against Malta and then followed it up with a hat-trick in his next Chester appearance against Brentford. 12 months later he moved to Wrexham for £125,000, having scored in his final Chester appearance at Barnsley. His move led to Ian Rush successfully becoming Chester's regular centre-forward.

Edwards made his Second Division debut for Wrexham in a 1-0 defeat at West Ham on 3 November 1979, and went on to spend three years at Wrexham, during which time he was disappointingly plagued with niggling injuries, but he did score a cracking volley at Derby County in September 1980 that was voted the BBC's Match of the Day goal of the month. However, he just missed out on the Goal of the Season to Aston Villa's Tony Morley. Edwards played in the Wrexham side that beat FA Cup holders West Ham United in the FA Cup in Third Round in January 1981. It was the first time ever that the FA Cup holders had been knocked out of the competition at the first time of asking to defend the trophy. Edwards also played in another memorable FA Cup match when Wrexham beat Brian Clough's Nottingham Forest 3-1 to set up another mouth-watering tie with Chelsea, losing 2-1 in the second replay. Edwards' last game for Wrexham, who by then had suffered relegation, was a 2-1 defeat at Crystal Palace in May 1982 when Edwards was sent off. Ironically, he then joined..... Crystal Palace under the guidance of new manager Alan Mullery for a largely unsuccessful spell. However, Edwards struck the decisive winner for Palace in their final game of the season against Burnley to save them from relegation to Division Three with his final touch for the club. This was to also mark the end of his professional career as he retired due to his injuries and he played briefly for Mold Alexandra and Porthmadog. Outside of football he worked as a milkman in the Wrexham area and then became the owner of a hotel near Criccieth. He also had a spell as manager of Porthmadog before being replaced by Mickey Thomas.

== Honours ==
Chester

- Debenhams Cup winners: 1976–77.
