= Josh Thole =

American baseball player (born 1986)

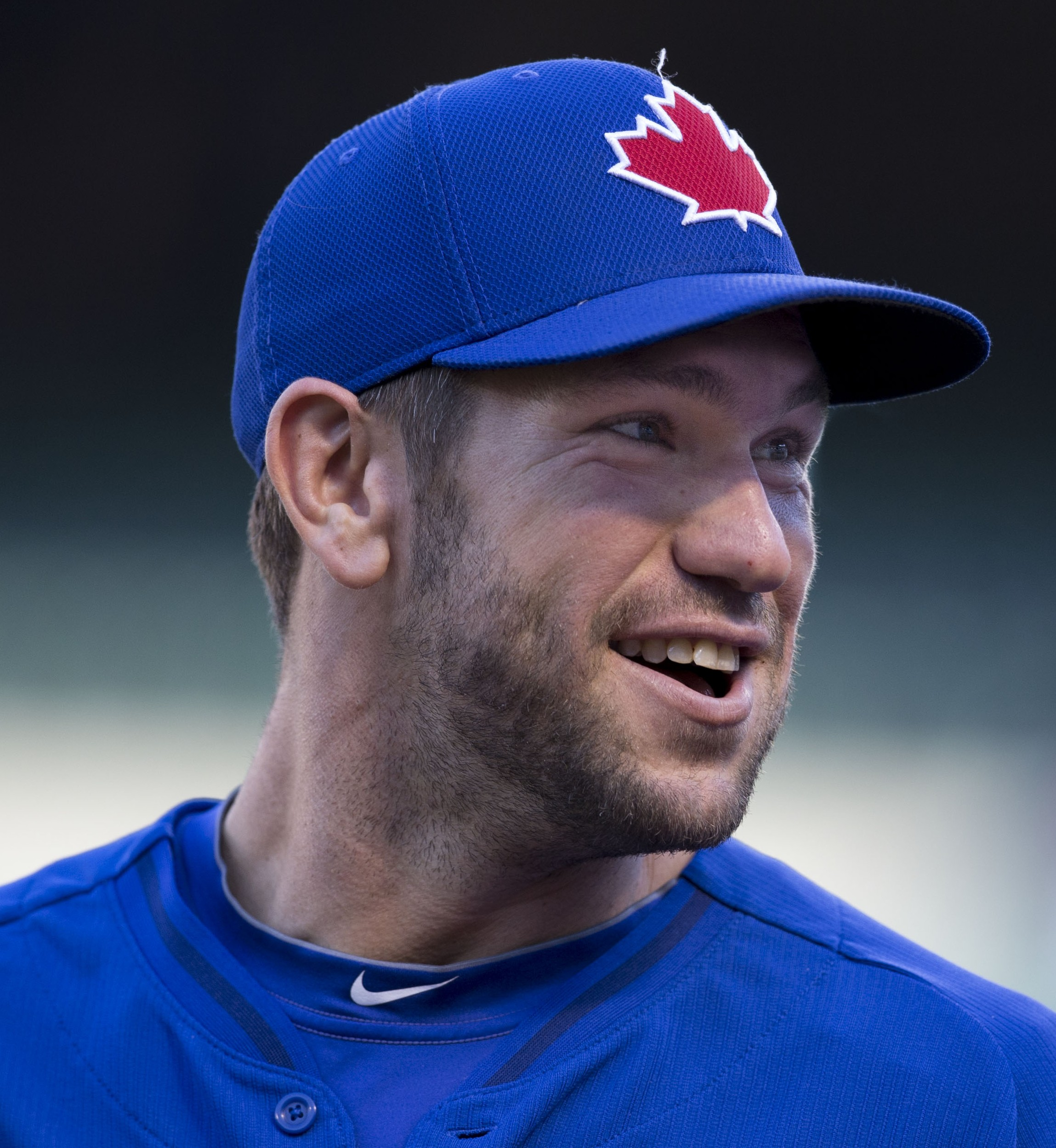
- Thole with the Toronto Blue Jays
- Catcher
- Born: October 28, 1986 (age 40); Breese, Illinois, U.S.
- Batted: Left Threw: Right

MLB debut
- September 3, 2009, for the New York Mets

Last MLB appearance
- September 21, 2016, for the Toronto Blue Jays

MLB statistics
- Batting average: .242
- Home runs: 9
- Runs batted in: 111
- Stats at Baseball Reference

Teams
- New York Mets (2009–2012); Toronto Blue Jays (2013–2016)

Joshua Michael Thole (pronounced toll-EE) (born October 28, 1986) is an American former professional baseball catcher who played in Major League Baseball (MLB) for the New York Mets and Toronto Blue Jays.

== Early life ==
Thole grew up in Breese, Illinois, and attended Mater Dei High School. In November 2004, he signed a letter of intent to play college baseball in NCAA Division II for Quincy University in Quincy, Illinois.

== Professional career ==
=== New York Mets ===
==== Minor leagues ====
Thole was drafted by the New York Mets in the 13th round of the 2005 Major League Baseball draft. He was assigned to the Gulf Coast League Mets, where he played in 35 games and hit .269 with one home run and 12 runs batted in (RBI). He played the entire 2006 minor league season with the Rookie-Advanced Kingsport Mets, appearing in 36 games and batting .235 with one home run and 12 RBI. Thole was assigned to the Single–A Savannah Sand Gnats in 2007, and played in a career-high 117 games. While he did not hit a home run that season, he hit .267 with 36 RBI and walked more than he struck out, with 61 and 57 respectively.

Thole was promoted to the High–A St. Lucie Mets in 2008, where he was a mid-season and postseason All-Star. In 111 games that year, he would hit .300 with five home runs and 56 RBI. In the offseason, Thole played in 19 games for the Peoria Saguaros of the Arizona Fall League, where he was named a Rising Star, batting .319 with two home runs and 17 RBI. He was assigned to the Double-A Binghamton Mets to open the 2009 season, and hit .328 with one home run and 46 RBI in 103 games. He was named a mid-season All-Star for the second consecutive season, and established himself as a solid singles hitter.

==== Major leagues ====
After viewing Thole in the 2009 spring training, Mets pitching coach Dan Warthen "gushed" about Thole's catcher skills. In 2009, Thole stated, "My throwing is still coming along." On August 31, 2009, Thole was called up to the major leagues. In his first major league at-bat, he singled to record his first major league hit. Thole would play 17 games for the Mets in 2009, batting .321 with 9 RBI. During the offseason, Thole played in 44 games for the Leones del Caracas of the Venezuelan Winter League, and hit .381 with three home runs and 28 RBI.

After spending much of the 2010 season with the Triple-A Buffalo Bisons, Thole was called up to the Mets in June. On July 20, 2010, Thole hit his first major league home run, a solo homer, off of Barry Enright in a game against the Arizona Diamondbacks at Chase Field. On October 1, 2010, he hit a walk-off home run off Tyler Clippard to give the Mets a 2-1 win. Thole spent the entire season with the New York Mets as a catcher. He hit .268, drove in 40 runs and hit three home runs over 340 at bats.

Thole broke camp with the Mets as their starting catcher. On May 9, 2012, Thole was placed on the seven-day disabled list after suffering a concussion in a plate collision with Phillies first baseman Ty Wigginton on May 7. On June 1, 2012, Thole was reactivated and caught Johan Santana's no-hitter, the first in franchise history.

=== Toronto Blue Jays ===
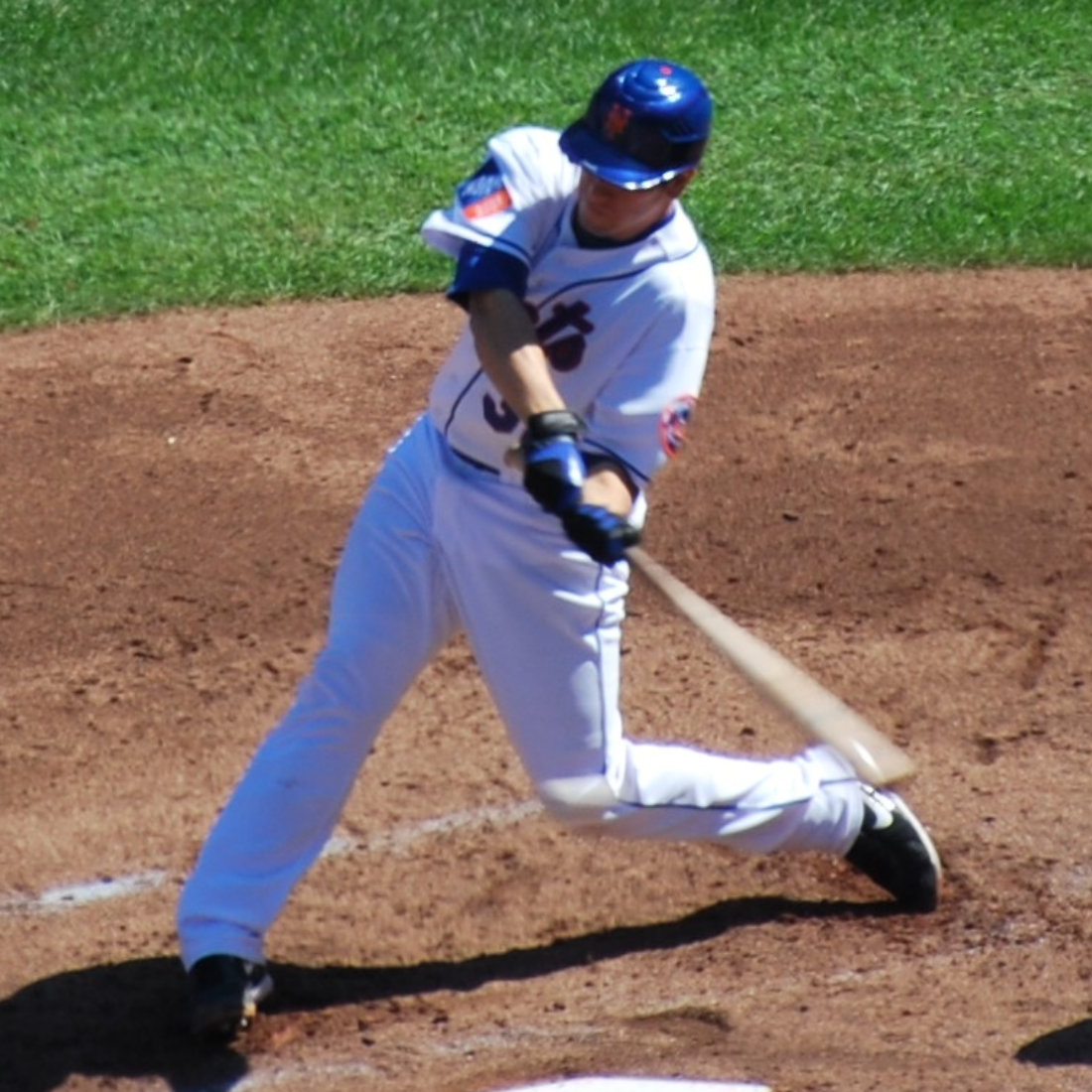
Thole batting for the Mets in 2009.

On December 17, 2012, the Mets traded Thole, R. A. Dickey, and Mike Nickeas to the Toronto Blue Jays in exchange for Travis d'Arnaud, Noah Syndergaard, John Buck, and Wuilmer Becerra. On January 18, 2013, the Blue Jays announced that arbitration with Thole had been avoided by signing him to a two-year contract worth $2.5 million, with a club option for the 2015 season at $1.75 million. On March 24, Thole was reassigned to minor league camp and started the season with the Triple-A Buffalo Bisons. He was recalled by the Blue Jays on June 7 when Henry Blanco was designated for assignment. Thole made his Blue Jays debut in the 16th inning of an 18 inning win against the Texas Rangers on June 8, going 0-2 at the plate. He finished the 2013 season batting just .175 with one home run and eight RBI in 45 games. Thole began the 2014 season in Toronto, as R. A. Dickey's personal catcher. He improved upon his results from 2013, finishing 2014 with a batting average of .252 with 7 RBI in 56 games played. On November 1, the Blue Jays picked up Thole's $1.75 million option for the 2015 season.

After the signing of Russell Martin in the offseason, the Blue Jays entered 2015 spring training with three catchers on their roster. Martin began catching R. A. Dickey early in camp, and supplanted Thole as his personal catcher. On March 31, Thole was assigned to Triple-A Buffalo. On April 23, Thole was recalled to the Blue Jays when Dioner Navarro was placed on the disabled list. He was optioned back to Buffalo on June 2. On August 23, Thole was recalled from Buffalo. He played in 18 games in 2015, and batted .204 with two RBI.

On December 2, 2015, Thole was non-tendered by the Blue Jays, making him a free agent. He signed a one-year, $800,000 contract with the Blue Jays on December 4.

Thole made the Opening Day roster for 2016, once again serving as R. A. Dickey's personal catcher. He hit his first home run of the season on April 5, in the Blue Jays 5–3 win over the Tampa Bay Rays. After the Blue Jays reacquired Dioner Navarro from the Chicago White Sox on August 26, Thole's role with the team was brought into question. After catching Dickey's start on August 28, Thole was designated for assignment by Toronto, who hoped that he would go unclaimed off waivers and be released, and could be re-signed on September 1 after the Major League roster expansion. Thole elected free agency on August 30, and signed with the Blue Jays on August 31; thus maintaining his postseason eligibility. Thole played in 50 games for the Blue Jays in 2016, hitting .169 with one home run and seven RBI. On November 18, Thole cleared outright waivers and elected free agency.

=== Arizona Diamondbacks ===
On January 23, 2017, Thole signed a minor league contract with the Arizona Diamondbacks. He suffered a torn hamstring in a spring training game against the Chicago Cubs on March 8. On March 18, Diamondbacks manager Torey Lovullo stated that Thole would likely require surgery and miss the entire 2017 season.

On January 11, 2018, Thole re–signed with Arizona on a minor league contract. He was released by the Diamondbacks organization on March 18.

=== New Britain Bees ===
On May 29, 2018, Thole signed with the New Britain Bees of the independent Atlantic League of Professional Baseball. In 17 games for the Bees, Thole hit .317/.425/.367 with no home runs and 10 RBI.

=== Detroit Tigers ===
On June 21, 2018, Thole's contract was purchased by the Detroit Tigers organization. In 21 games for the Double–A Erie SeaWolves, hitting .238/.320/.302 with one home run and 10 RBI. Thole elected free agency following the season on November 2.

=== Los Angeles Dodgers ===
On January 16, 2019, Thole signed a minor league contract with the Los Angeles Dodgers.

=== Los Angeles Angels ===
On July 12, 2019, Thole and Adam McCreery were traded to the Los Angeles Angels in exchange for cash considerations. He became a free agent following the 2019 season.

On January 30, 2020, Thole signed a minor league deal with the New York Yankees. Thole did not play in a game in 2020 due to the cancellation of the minor league season because of the COVID-19 pandemic. He became a free agent on November 2.
