= Phil Williams (footballer, born 1958) =

English footballer

Personal information
- Full name: Philip Leslie Williams
- Date of birth: 5 April 1958 (age 68)
- Place of birth: Birkenhead, England
- Position: Forward

Youth career
- 1974–1976: Chester

Senior career*
Years	Team	Apps	(Gls)
1976–c 1983	Chester	1	(0)
1983–1990	Cray Wanderers		
- * Club domestic league appearances and goals

Philip Williams (born 5 April 1958) is an English former footballer.

A product of Chester's youth policy, Williams made a solitary appearance in The Football League for the club when wearing the number nine shirt during a 0–0 draw at home to Preston North End on 11 September 1976.

He did not make any further first-team appearances for Chester and later played for Cray Wanderers.

== Bibliography ==
- Sumner, Chas (1997). On the Borderline: The Official History of Chester City F.C. 1885-1997. Yore Publications. ISBN 978-1-874427-52-0.
