= Mike Nickeas =

Canadian baseball player (born 1983)

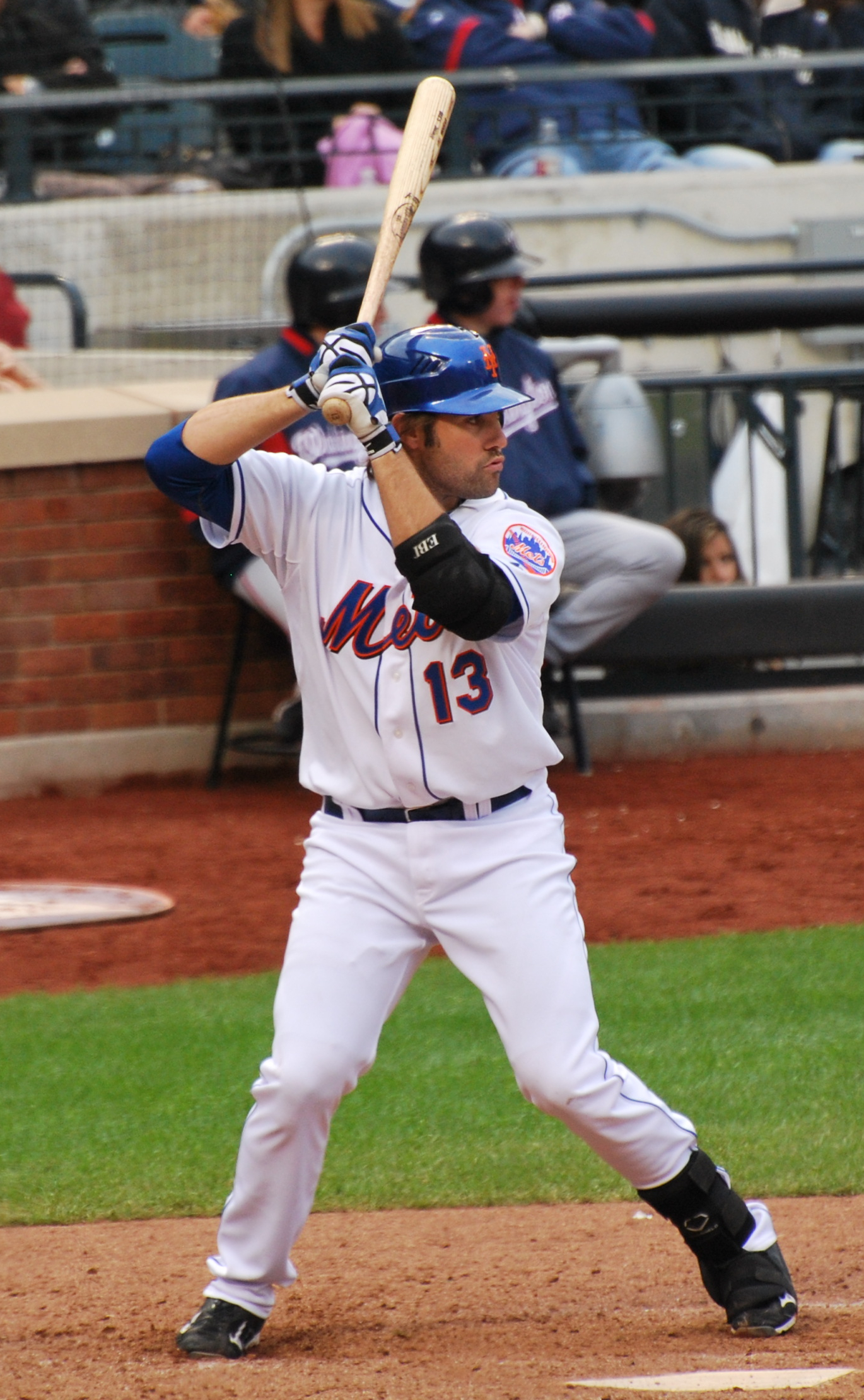
- Nickeas with the New York Mets in 2010

Georgia Tech Yellow Jackets
- Catcher
- Born: February 13, 1983 (age 43); Vancouver, British Columbia, Canada
- Batted: Right Threw: Right

MLB debut
- September 4, 2010, for the New York Mets

Last MLB appearance
- September 10, 2013, for the Toronto Blue Jays

MLB statistics
- Batting average: .180
- Home runs: 2
- Runs batted in: 19
- Stats at Baseball Reference

Teams
- New York Mets (2010–2012); Toronto Blue Jays (2013)
Medals
Men's baseball
Representing United States
Pan American Games
| Silver medal – second place | 2003 Santo Domingo | National team |
Men's baseball
Representing Great Britain
European Baseball Championship
| Silver medal – second place | 2007 Montjuïc | National team |

Michael James Nickeas (born February 13, 1983) is a Canadian former professional baseball catcher. Nickeas played four seasons in Major League Baseball (MLB) with the New York Mets and Toronto Blue Jays. Nickeas also represented Great Britain internationally.

== Early years ==
Nickeas was born in Vancouver, British Columbia while his father played for the Vancouver Whitecaps of the NASL. His father, Mark, is from England, and his mother is American. He grew up in California and graduated from Westlake High School in Westlake Village, California. Nickeas led his high school team to the Mamonte League Championship in 2000 and 2001 and was the MVP his senior year of high school in 2001.

== College career ==
Nickeas played three years for the Georgia Tech baseball team. In 2002, he played collegiate summer baseball with the Wareham Gatemen of the Cape Cod Baseball League. He was drafted by the Texas Rangers in the 5th round of the 2004 draft. He played for the USA youth team, junior national team and the USA National team, becoming only the second player in USA baseball history to play on 3 teams. In 2007, he switched his allegiance to Great Britain and played for the team in the 2007 European Baseball Championship. He was voted to the tournament's all-star team as the British team finished as silver medalists.

== Professional career ==
=== Texas Rangers ===
Nickeas started his pro career with the Spokane Indians of the Northwest League. He batted .288 with 10 HRs and 55 RBIs for Spokane. In 2005, he played for the Rangers' Double-A affiliate, Frisco RoughRiders. He batted for a .202 average with five home runs and 24 runs-batted-in in 68 games, but Baseball America named Nickeas the best defensive catcher in the Rangers minor league system.

=== New York Mets ===
On August 30, 2006, he was traded to the New York Mets for outfielder Víctor Díaz. In 2007, he split time between the "High A" St. Lucie Mets and Double-A Binghamton Mets and in 2008, he split time between Binghamton and the Triple-A New Orleans Zephyrs.

Nickeas earned his first promotion to the major leagues on September 2, 2010. He made his major league debut the same day on Jenrry Mejía's first major league start on September 4, 2010 as he was the Mets catcher against the Chicago Cubs at Wrigley Field. On September 29, he got his first two major league hits against the Milwaukee Brewers. He hit his first major league home run April 21, 2011, off Houston Astros pitcher J. A. Happ.

On May 1, 2011 he was sent down to the minors as Ronny Paulino came up to the Mets.

For the beginning of the 2012 Mets season, Nickeas played as a backup catcher for Josh Thole. On May 26, 2012, Nickeas hit a grand slam at Citi Field, scoring Ike Davis, Vinny Rottino, and Kirk Nieuwenhuis. On July 25, Nickeas was once again sent down to the minors as Rob Johnson came up to the Mets. He was recalled on September 1 due to rosters expanding.

On November 9, Nickeas signed a minor league deal with the Mets with an invitation to spring training. He had elected free agency after being outrighted off the 40-man roster.

=== Toronto Blue Jays ===
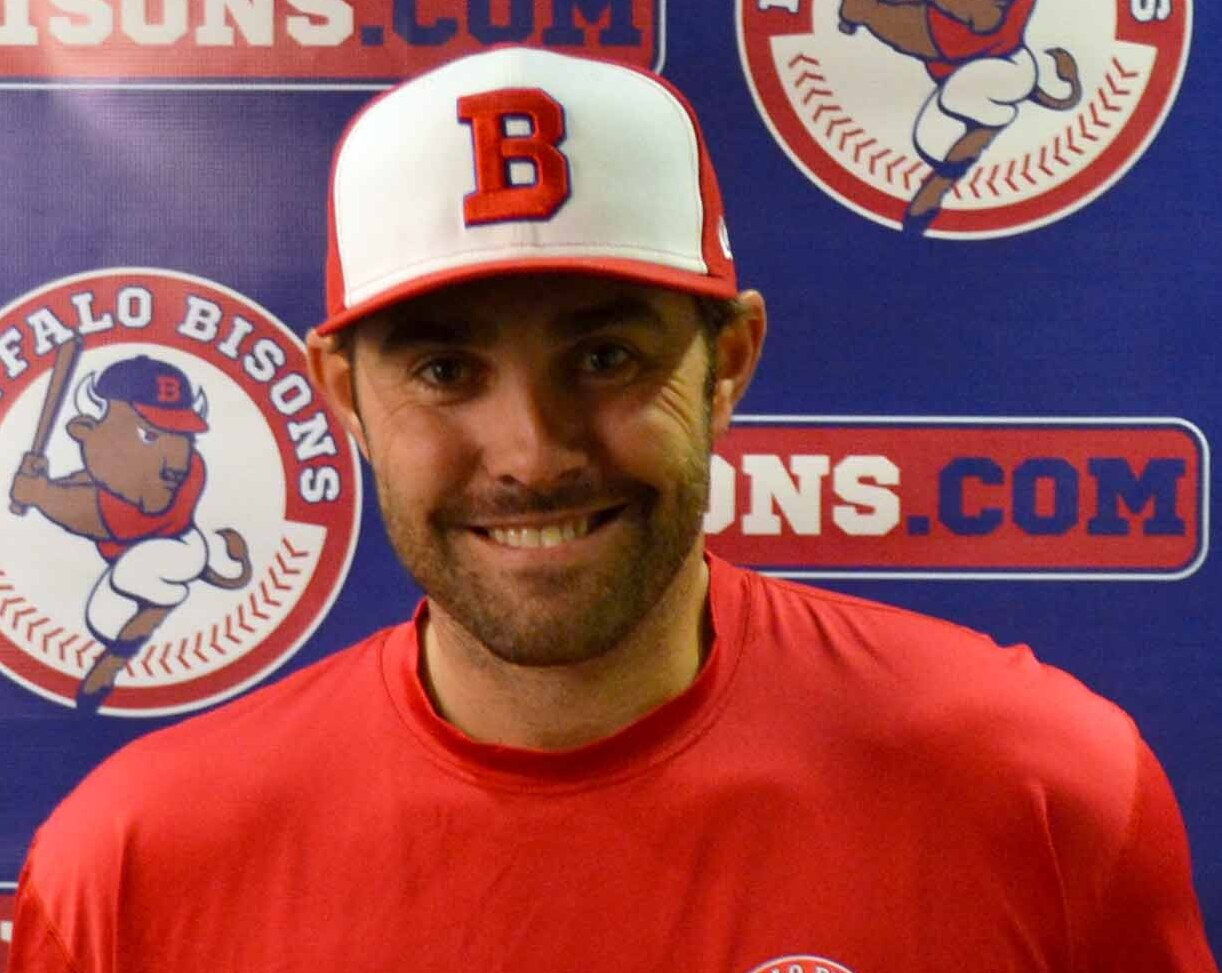
Nickeas with the Buffalo Bisons in 2013

On December 17, 2012, the Mets traded Nickeas, R. A. Dickey, and Josh Thole to the Toronto Blue Jays for Travis d'Arnaud, Noah Syndergaard, John Buck, and Wuilmer Becerra. He was assigned to the Buffalo Bisons, the Blue Jays' Triple-A affiliate, for whom Nickeas had previously played, when it had been the Mets' Triple-A affiliate. On August 8, 2013, it was reported that Nickeas has been hit with a pitch, resulting in a non-displaced hairline fracture on his forearm. Up to his injury, Nickeas had played 49 games for the Bisons, and batted just .166 with 1 home run and 11 RBI. His contract was selected by the Blue Jays on September 3 after the Bisons season ended, and the major league rosters expanded. Nickeas made only one appearance with the Blue Jays in 2013, coming in as a defensive replacement against the Los Angeles Angels of Anaheim on September 10. He did not make a plate appearance, and was outrighted to Buffalo on October 4.

Nickeas was invited to 2014 spring training, and sent to minor league camp on March 24, 2014. He spent the entire 2014 season with the Buffalo Bisons, batting .207 in 49 games. On March 9, 2015, it was reported that Nickeas had retired from baseball and gone back to school at Georgia Tech.

== International career ==
Nickeas was selected to the Great Britain national baseball team for the 2007 European Baseball Championship, winning a silver medal.

== Coaching career ==
Nickeas returned to Georgia Tech to complete his bachelor's degree in 2015. In 2016 and 2017, he served as a volunteer coach and in 2017 was promoted to assistant coach.
