= Mark Nickeas =

English footballer

Personal information
- Date of birth: 20 October 1956 (age 70)
- Place of birth: Southport, England
- Height: 5 ft 9 in (1.75 m)
- Position: Defender

Senior career*
Years	Team	Apps	(Gls)
1975–1979	Chester	60	(1)
1980–1984	Vancouver Whitecaps (indoor)	35	(9)
1981–1984	Vancouver Whitecaps	53	(1)
1984–1985	Dallas Sidekicks (indoor)	34	(3)
1985–1987	San Jose Earthquakes		
- * Club domestic league appearances and goals

Mark Nickeas (born 20 October 1956) is an English retired football defender. He spent five seasons in the North American Soccer League, one in the Major Indoor Soccer League and two in the Western Soccer Alliance.

In 1975, Nickeas began his professional career with Chester. In 1980, he moved to the Vancouver Whitecaps of the North American Soccer League. The NASL collapsed following the 1984 season. On 1 November 1984, he signed as a free agent with the Dallas Sidekicks in the Major Indoor Soccer League. The team released him on 16 April 1985 In June 1985, he signed with the San Jose Earthquakes which played as an independent team that summer, but did compete in the Western Alliance Challenge Series. In 1986 and 1987, Nickeas and his teammates spent the season in the Western Soccer Alliance.

He lives in Westlake Village, California. His son is retired professional baseball player Mike Nickeas. He has two children, Michael Nickeas and Hailey Rae Nickeas.
