= Blister (disambiguation) =

A blister is a small pocket of fluid in the upper layer of the skin caused by heat, electricity, chemicals, light, radiation, or friction.

Blister(s) or Blistering may also refer to:

- Blood blister
- Bleb (medicine)
- Anti-torpedo bulge, also known as an anti-torpedo blister
- Blister (TV series)
- Blister pack, a type of packaging
- Blistering (magazine), an online heavy metal and hard rock magazine
- "Blister", a song by Jimmy Eat World from the album Clarity
- "Blisters", a song by Neurosis from the album The Word as Law
- "Blisters", a song by War from the album Deliver the Word
- Another name for a mustard plaster
- A secure, hygienic, pre-packaged, plastic strip, which allows for individual medicinal and nutritional tablets to be popped out.
