= Noah Syndergaard =

American baseball player (born 1992)

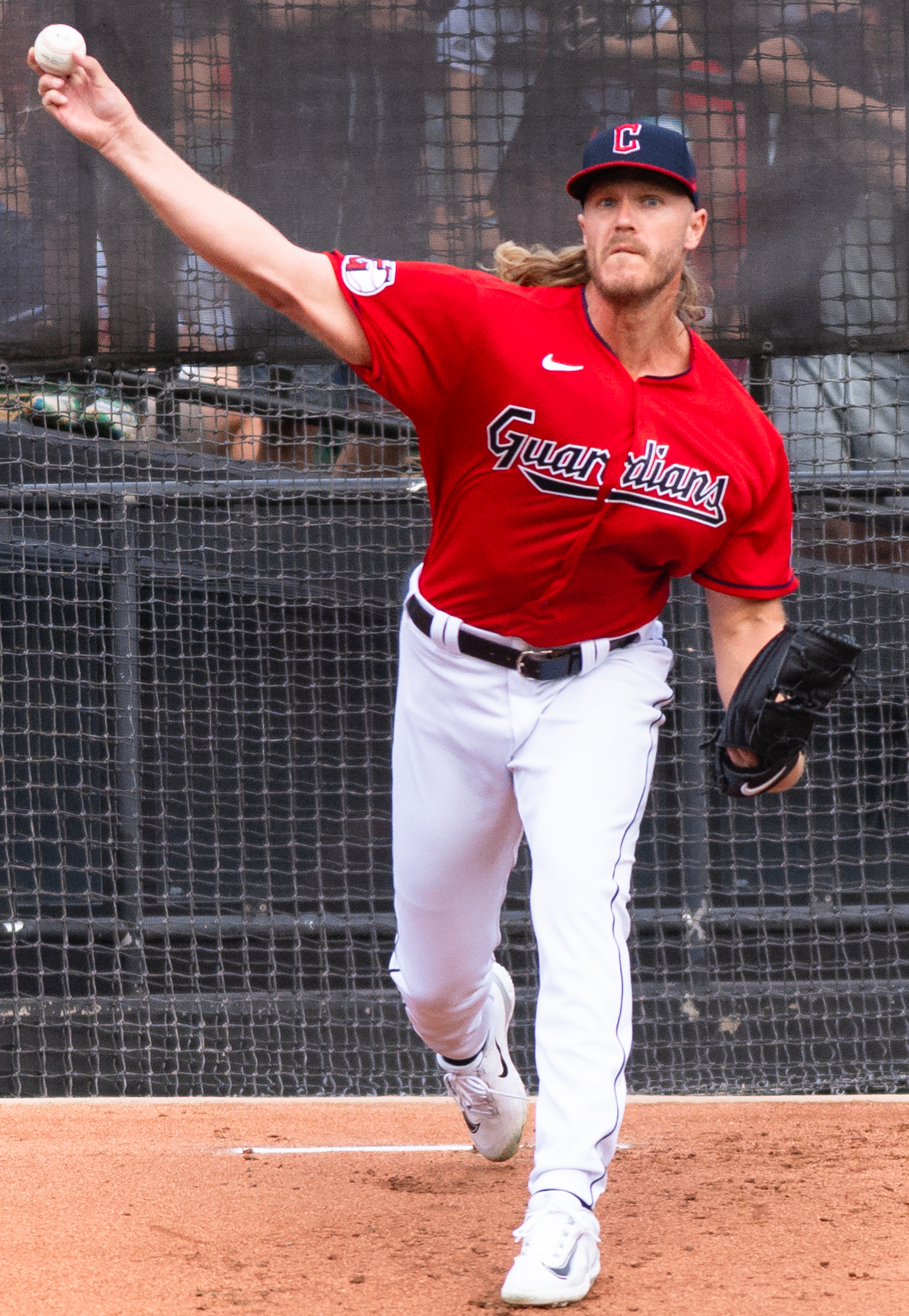
- Syndergaard with the Cleveland Guardians in 2023

Free agent
- Pitcher
- Born: August 29, 1992 (age 34); Mansfield, Texas, U.S.
- Bats: Left Throws: Right

MLB debut
- May 12, 2015, for the New York Mets

MLB statistics (through 2023 season)
- Win–loss record: 59–47
- Earned run average: 3.71
- Strikeouts: 928
- Stats at Baseball Reference

Teams
- New York Mets (2015–2019, 2021); Los Angeles Angels (2022); Philadelphia Phillies (2022); Los Angeles Dodgers (2023); Cleveland Guardians (2023)

Career highlights and awards
- All-Star (2016)

Noah Seth Syndergaard (born August 29, 1992), nicknamed "Thor", is an American professional baseball pitcher who is a free agent. He has previously played in Major League Baseball (MLB) for the New York Mets, Los Angeles Angels, Philadelphia Phillies, Los Angeles Dodgers, and Cleveland Guardians.

Born in Mansfield, Texas, Syndergaard did not establish himself as a baseball player for Mansfield Legacy High School until his senior year in 2010, where his pitch velocity was bolstered by a growth spurt and weight training regimen. Despite his strong season, Syndergaard's late development meant that he was mostly overlooked by scouts and college coaches, and he received only one college baseball scholarship offer. He turned down Dallas Baptist University, however, when the Toronto Blue Jays selected him in the first round, 38th overall, of the 2010 MLB draft. After three years in the Blue Jays' farm system, Syndergaard was traded with several other prospects to the Mets in exchange for reigning Cy Young Award winner R. A. Dickey. He made back-to-back appearances in the All-Star Futures Game in 2013 and 2014, but was left off of the Mets' September call-up list both years.

Syndergaard made his MLB debut in May 2015, following an injury to Dillon Gee. He impressed manager Terry Collins and remained in the starting rotation for the rest of the regular season. The Mets appeared that year in the 2015 World Series against the Kansas City Royals, with Syndergaard pitching in the team's only win of the series. The next year, Syndergaard was named a National League (NL) All-Star, and became one of only five Mets pitchers to strike out 200 batters in one season before the age of 25. His 2017 and 2018 seasons were limited by injuries and illness, but he managed to start in 32 games for the Mets in 2019. During spring training in 2020, Syndergaard was diagnosed with an ulnar collateral ligament injury and had to undergo Tommy John surgery. He returned for only two innings at the end of the Mets' 2021 season.

In 2022, Syndergaard rejected a qualifying offer from the Mets to sign a one-year, $21 million contract with the Angels. He was traded to the Phillies at the 2022 trade deadline and split time between the starting rotation and bullpen during the team's postseason run that culminated in an appearance in the 2022 World Series. Following the season, he signed a one-year, $13 million contract with the Dodgers for the 2023 season.

== Early life ==
Syndergaard was born on August 29, 1992, in Mansfield, Texas, to Brad, a horse breeder, and Heidi Syndergaard, a customer service agent for Abbott Laboratories. He had limited contact with his two paternal half-sisters, who were 14 and 17 years older than Syndergaard. Although he grew up in an area where American football was the most popular sport, Syndergaard never seriously played the sport. Instead, at the urging of his mother, he began playing baseball around the age of seven. Syndergaard attended Mansfield Legacy High School, where he was classmates with future professional baseball pitcher Tejay Antone. He was smaller than many of his classmates until the summer before his senior year, when a growth spurt brought Syndergaard up to 6 feet 4 inches (1.93 m), and a weight training regimen helped bring his pitch velocity from 80 mph (130 km/h) to 90 mph (140 km/h).

In 2010, Syndergaard's senior year of high school, the Fort Worth Star-Telegram named him their Player of the Year. As a pitcher, he had an 11–3 win–loss record and a 1.27 earned run average (ERA), striking out 135 batters and walking only 24 in 88 innings pitched. He was also a successful hitter, batting .409 with 17 doubles, nine home runs, and 41 runs batted in (RBI). Syndergaard's late development, however, meant that he was mostly overlooked by baseball scouts. He had also been injured during his junior season, a time when many college baseball coaches begin looking at prospects. Syndergaard spoke with coaches for Oklahoma, Nebraska, and Baylor, but the only school willing to offer him a scholarship was Dallas Baptist University, where he committed to play for the Patriots as a batter, not a pitcher.

== Professional career ==
=== Draft and minor leagues (2010–2014) ===
The Toronto Blue Jays of Major League Baseball (MLB) selected Syndergaard in the first round, 38th overall, of the 2010 MLB draft. He chose to forego his commitment to Dallas Baptist, accepting the Blue Jays' $600,000 signing bonus and beginning his professional baseball career instead. Syndergaard spent the 2010 season with the Rookie-level Gulf Coast League (GCL) Blue Jays, with whom he went 0–1 with a 2.70 ERA in five starts, striking out six batters in 13 1/3 innings. Syndergaard began the 2011 season with the Bluefield Blue Jays of the Appalachian League, Toronto's other Rookie-level team. After seven appearances, during which he went 4–0 with a 1.41 ERA and struck out 37 batters in 32 innings, he was promoted to the Class A Short-Season Vancouver Canadians of the Northwest League, by which point he could already reach pitch velocities up to 98 mph (158 km/h). In four starts for Vancouver, Syndergaard went 1–2 with a 2.00 ERA, and he received another promotion, this time to the Low-A Lansing Lugnuts of the Midwest League, at the end of August. He made only two appearances that season in Lansing, with no record and a 3.00 ERA, striking out nine batters in as many innings. Between the three teams, Syndergaard finished the 2011 season with a 5–2 record and 1.83 ERA in 13 games (11 starts), and he recorded 68 strikeouts in 59 innings.

Syndergaard returned to the Midwest League again in 2012. Lansing starting pitchers were limited to three innings apiece and paired together: on nights where Syndergaard pitched, he would trade off with Anthony DeSclafani. This "piggyback system" proved effective in keeping all of Lansing's starting pitchers sharp: by May 25, the combined ERA for the Syndergaard-DeSclafani pair was 3.07, and the team had a 2.56 ERA and 23–13 record. Through the first half of the season, Lansing led the Midwest League with 47 wins and a 2.80 team ERA, while the trio of Syndergaard, Justin Nicolino, and Aaron Sanchez had a combined 11–2 record and 1.90 ERA. Playing in 27 games for Lansing, 19 of which were starts, Syndergaard went 8–5 for the season with a 2.60 ERA, and he struck out 122 batters in 103 2/3 innings.

On December 17, 2012, Syndergaard was traded to the New York Mets as part of a larger deal that allowed Toronto to acquire reigning Cy Young Award winner R. A. Dickey. In addition to Dickey, the Blue Jays acquired catchers Josh Thole and Mike Nickeas in the trade, while the Mets received Syndergaard, Travis d'Arnaud, John Buck, and Wuilmer Becerra. Syndergaard joined the Class A-Advanced St. Lucie Mets of the Florida State League for the 2013 season, forming a starting rotation with Hansel Robles, Luis Mateo, Domingo Tapia, and Jacob deGrom. He went 2–3 with a 2.81 ERA in his first 11 starts for St. Lucie, striking out 59 in 57 2/3 innings, and was one of three Mets selected for the Florida State League All-Star Game in June. He made one more start for St. Lucie, finishing 3–3 with a 3.11 ERA, before receiving a promotion to the Double-A Binghamton Mets of the Eastern League on June 23. Shortly after his promotion, Syndergaard was invited to the 2013 All-Star Futures Game, where he pitched a scoreless first inning. Syndergaard struggled in his first outing after the All-Star game, allowing three runs on seven hits against the Richmond Flying Squirrels, but recovered quickly, and in 11 starts for Binghamton, he was 6–1 with a 3.00 ERA and struck out 69 batters in 54 innings.

Syndergaard was promoted to the Triple-A Las Vegas 51s for the 2014 season, winning his Pacific Coast League debut by striking out five batters in six innings of an 11–8 victory over the Fresno Grizzlies. His first stretch in Vegas was uneven, with a 4–2 record and 3.92 ERA through May 10, and he made a point to spend the season honing his breaking balls to better handle more advanced batters. After experiencing two injuries in May and June, first a strained pronator teres muscle followed by a sprained shoulder, Syndergaard received another invitation to the All-Star Futures Game. This time, he served as the closer for the US team, earning a save with a scoreless ninth inning to win the game 3–2. Syndergaard's season was overall a success, with a 9–7 record and 4.60 ERA in 26 starts and 133 innings. Additionally, despite pitching primarily in the hitter-advantageous Cashman Field, Syndergaard allowed only six home runs and led the Pacific Coast League with 145 strikeouts. Despite this, he was not chosen as a September call-up for the Mets, who could not give Syndergaard any valuable pitching time in the major leagues.

=== 2015: World Series Appearance ===
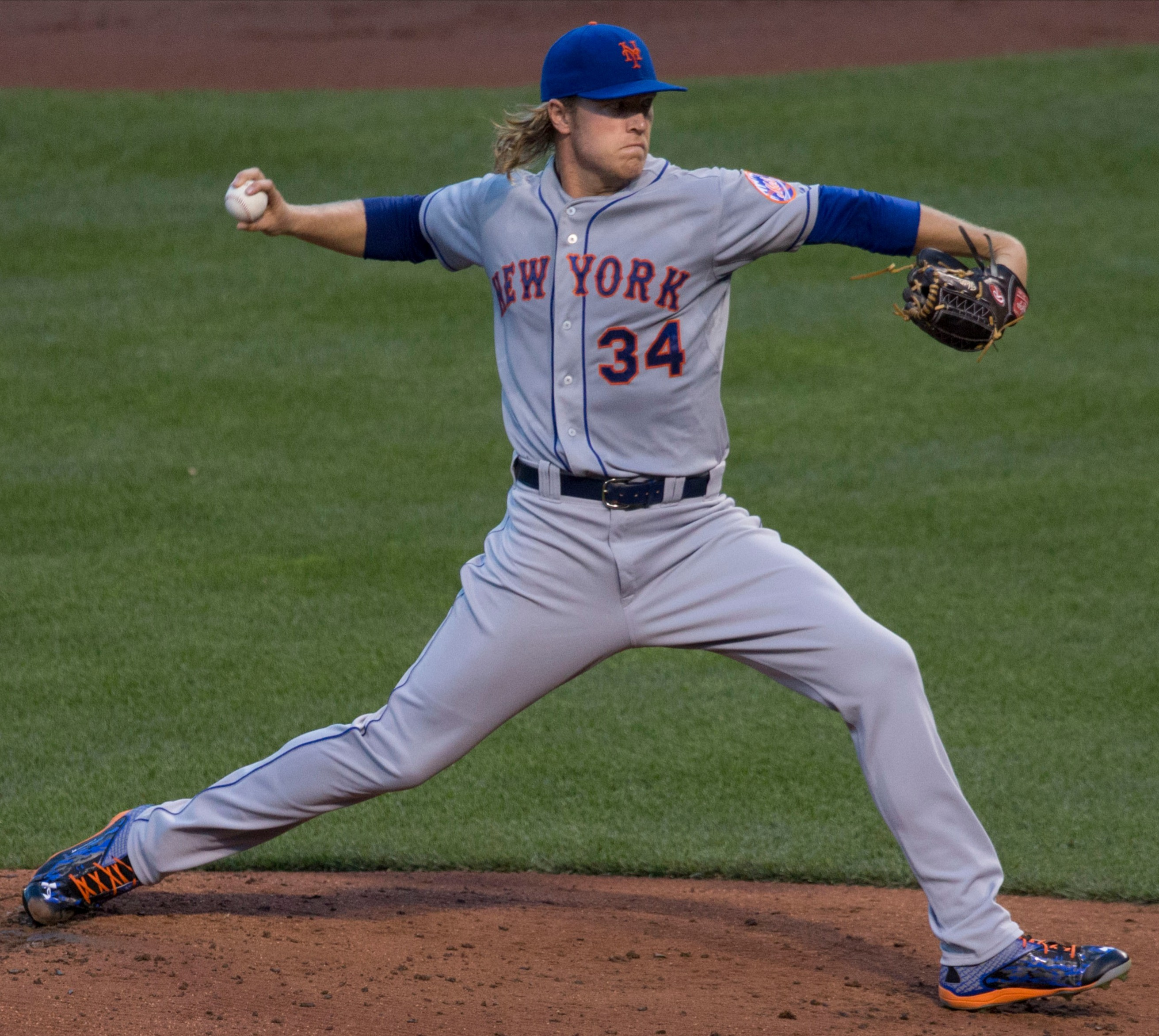
Syndergaard pitching for the Mets in 2015

Syndergaard opened the 2015 season in Las Vegas again, battling food poisoning and a forearm strain that April to post a 3–0 record and 1.82 ERA in his first five starts, as well as 34 strikeouts in 29 2/3 innings. When starting pitcher Dillon Gee was placed on the disabled list on May 8 with a strained groin, the Mets chose to call up Syndergaard over fellow top prospect Steven Matz. He made his MLB debut on May 12, holding the Chicago Cubs scoreless for five innings before allowing three hits in a row in the sixth, including a two-run home run from Chris Coghlan. He allowed a total of three runs on six hits in the 6–1 loss. Syndergaard's home debut at Citi Field came five days later, and he took the win by pitching six innings in a 5–1 victory over the Milwaukee Brewers. When Gee returned from the disabled list on May 22, Mets manager Terry Collins decided not to move Syndergaard, instead saying that he would keep a six-man starting rotation that made room for both pitchers. This plan was short-lived, and Gee was designated for assignment on June 15, cementing Syndergaard's position in the rotation.

While facing the Philadelphia Phillies on May 27, Syndergaard not only struck out six batters in 7 1/3 innings, but he went 3-for-3 in at bats, one of which was his first major league home run. In doing so, Syndergaard joined Walt Terrell, Dwight Gooden, and Sid Fernandez as the only Mets pitchers to record three hits, including one home run, in a single game. On July 10, he recorded a career-high 13 strikeouts in eight innings, striking out every member of the Arizona Diamondbacks' starting lineup at least once in the 4–2 win. It was the third time through 11 major league starts that he had reached double-digit strikeouts. He and teammate Lucas Duda were named National League (NL) Co-Players of the Week for the week ending August 3. While Duda recorded seven home runs, Syndergaard struck out an MLB-leading 18 batters in 16 innings of work, bringing his career strikeout total to 100 in only 15 starts. Syndergaard made 24 regular-season starts as a rookie, posting a 9–7 record and 3.24 ERA in the process while striking out 166 batters in 150 innings of work. He finished fourth in voting for NL Rookie of the Year, behind Jung Ho Kang, runner-up Matt Duffy, and winner Kris Bryant.

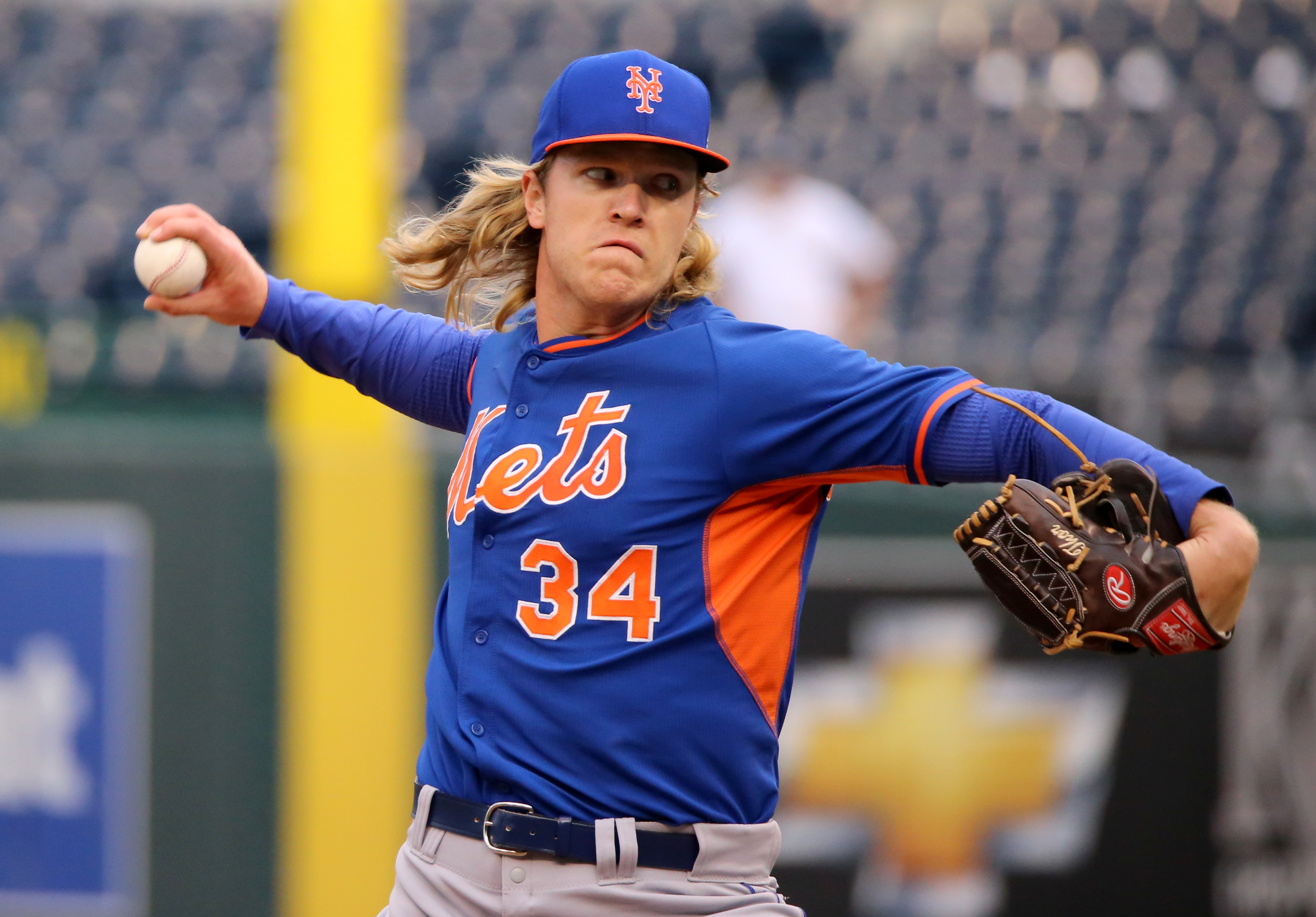
Syndergaard throwing live batting practice at World Series Media Day

On September 26, after defeating the Cincinnati Reds 10–2 at the Great American Ball Park, the Mets clinched their first NL East title and postseason appearance in nine years. They faced the Los Angeles Dodgers in the 2015 National League Division Series (NLDS), with Syndergaard starting in Game 2. He went 6 1/3 innings, allowing three runs while striking out nine, and the Dodgers took the game by a score of 5–2. Syndergaard made his first career appearance in relief for Game 5 of the NLDS, pitching a scoreless seventh inning in the 3–2 victory, helping to eliminate the Dodgers and send the Mets to the 2015 National League Championship Series (NLCS). Syndergaard started the second game of that series as well, outdueling Jake Arrieta of the Chicago Cubs by striking out nine batters in 5 2/3 innings of New York's 4–1 victory. The Mets swept the Cubs in the best-of-seven series, earning their first National League pennant and World Series appearance since 2000. With the Mets down 2–0 in the 2015 World Series against the Kansas City Royals, Syndergaard started Game 3, where he intentionally threw the game's first pitch high and tight to Kansas City shortstop Alcides Escobar. He went on to give the Mets their first win of the series, allowing three runs on seven hits but striking out six and leading New York to a 9–3 victory. It was the only game the Mets would win, as the Royals took the World Series in five games.

=== 2016: All-Star ===
Syndergaard's first start of the 2016 season came against the Royals, and despite rumors that Kansas City would attempt retribution for the intentional pitch at Escobar, the game transpired without controversy, with Syndergaard striking out nine batters in six scoreless innings of the 2–0 win. Through his first three starts of the season, Syndergaard was 2–0 with a 0.90 ERA and 29 strikeouts, and received Internet attention when a pitch he threw to batterymate Kevin Plawecki had enough momentum to leave an imprint of Plawecki's necklace on his chest. While facing the Dodgers on May 11, Syndergaard hit a pair of home runs against Los Angeles starter Kenta Maeda, becoming the first MLB pitcher since Micah Owings in 2007, and the second pitcher in Mets history following Walt Terrell in 1983, to hit two home runs in the same game. The Mets won the game 4–3 and Syndergaard was expected to complete the game, but concerns about his elbow health limited him to eight innings and 95 pitches. He was named the NL Player of the Week for the second time in his career on May 23 after striking out 21 batters and allowing no earned runs in 14 innings of work. The following week, Syndergaard was ejected from a Mets–Dodgers game after throwing a pitch behind the back of Chase Utley in a move that was believed to be retribution for a play during the NLDS that had fractured Rubén Tejada's leg. Syndergaard denied the allegation, saying that he had simply lost control of the ball.

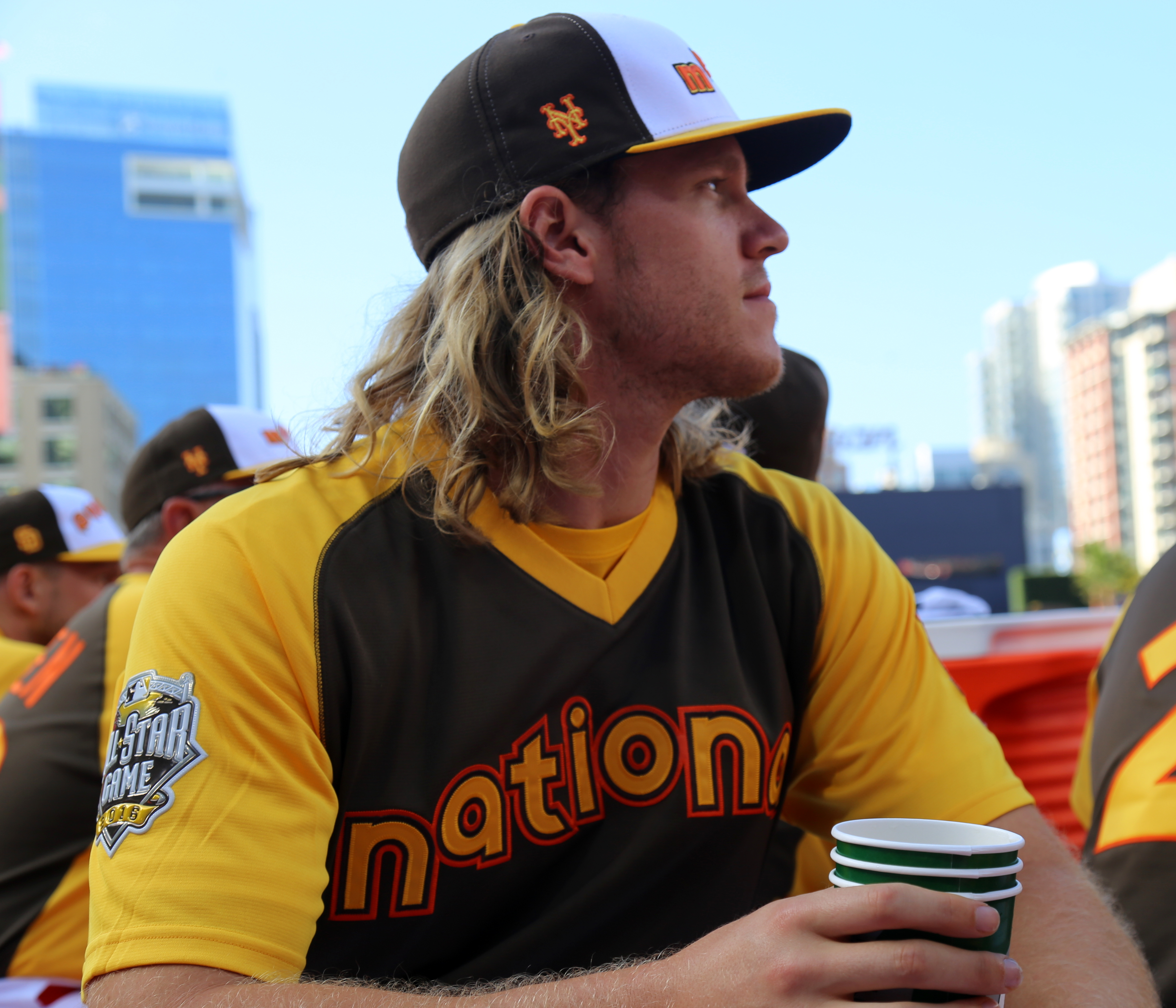
Syndergaard mid-All-Star Game weekend festivities in 2016

After struggling in a game against the Washington Nationals on June 27, lasting only three innings and squandering a 4–0 lead in the process, Syndergaard revealed that both he and Steven Matz were experiencing bone spurs in their respective pitching elbows, while confirming that it was being treated with anti-inflammatory medication and was often painless. On July 5, Syndergaard was named to the NL roster for the 2016 Major League Baseball All-Star Game, but he could not participate in the game due to arm fatigue. Syndergaard had a difficult stretch after the All-Star break, going winless in seven starts between July 3 and August 17 before pitching 5 2/3 innings in a 7–5 win against the Arizona Diamondbacks, during which he recorded another home run of his own. He joined Tom Seaver and Walt Terrell as the only Mets' pitchers to hit three home runs in a single MLB season. On September 14, he recorded his 200th strikeout of the season by retiring Danny Espinosa of Nationals. In doing so, the 24-year-old Syndergaard became the fifth Mets pitcher to strike out 200 or more batters before the age of 25.

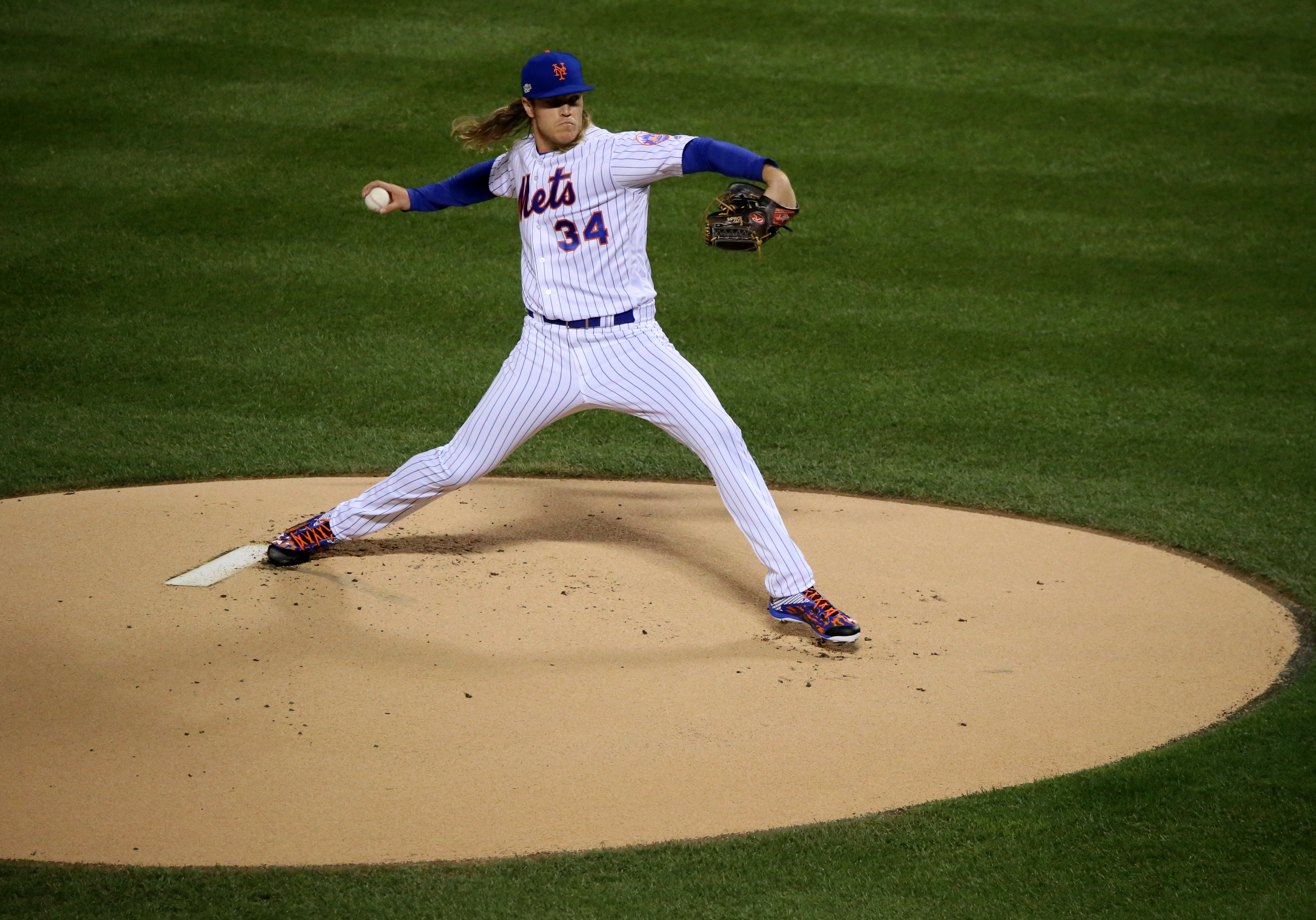
Syndergaard pitching in the 2016 National League Wild Card Game

With Matz, Matt Harvey, and Jacob deGrom injured, Syndergaard was selected to start for the Mets in the 2016 National League Wild Card Game against the San Francisco Giants. The game proved to be a pitchers' duel against the Giants' Madison Bumgarner, with Syndergaard carrying a no-hitter into the sixth inning, but Mets closer Jeurys Familia allowed the only runs of the game when he gave up a three-run home run to Conor Gillaspie in the ninth inning, eliminating the Mets from the postseason. Syndergaard finished the season with a 14–9 record and a 2.60 ERA in 30 starts, and he struck out 218 batters in 183 2/3 innings. Additionally, his 2.29 fielding independent pitching and 0.5 home runs per nine innings (HR/9) were the lowest among qualifying MLB pitchers. He came in eighth place during voting for the NL Cy Young Award and was 19th in NL MVP voting.

=== 2017–2019: Injury-limited seasons ===
==== 2017 ====
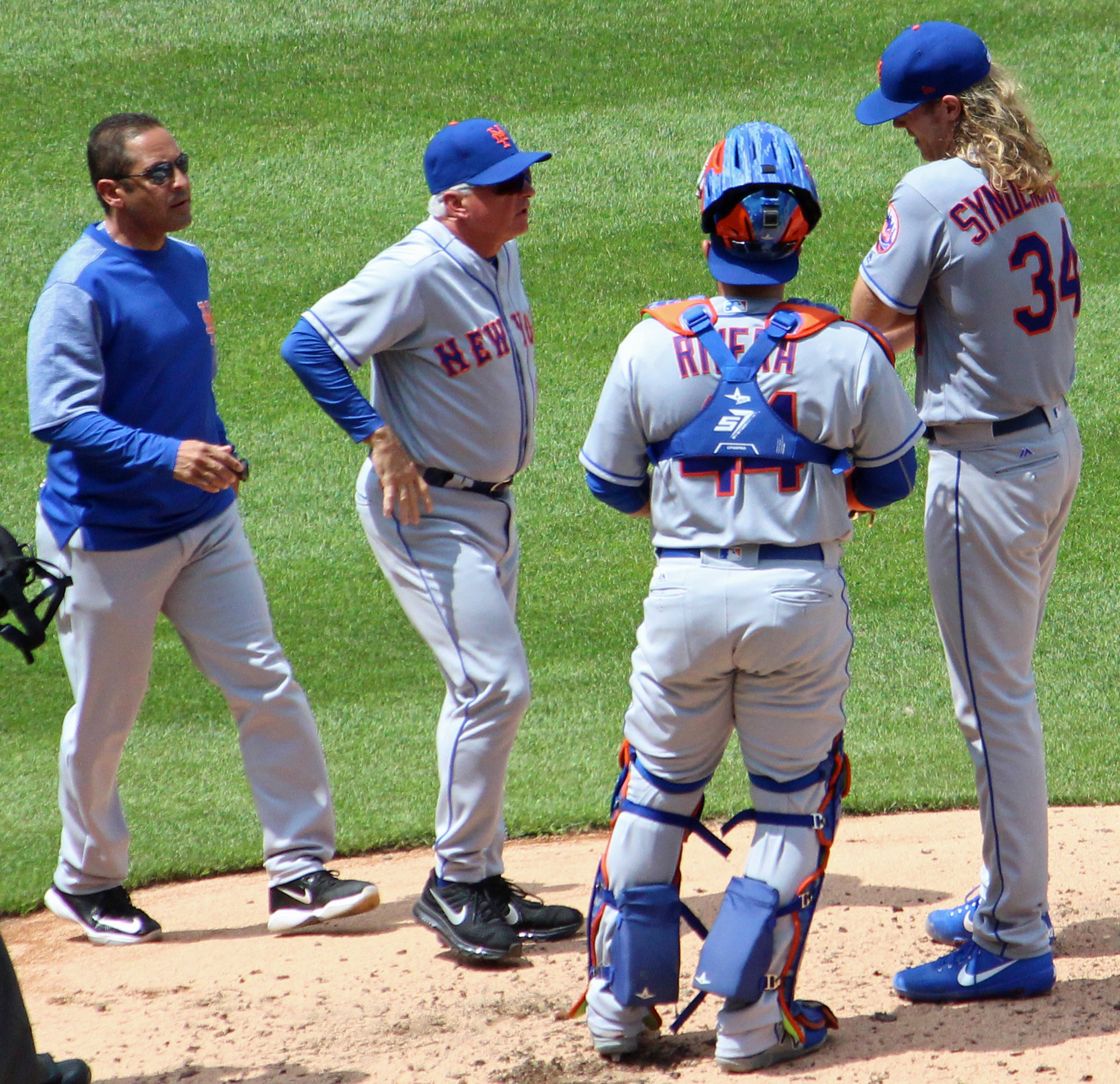
Syndergaard (right) after suffering an arm injury during a game on April 30, 2017 at Nationals Park

Having spent spring training focusing on honing his two-seam fastball, Syndergaard was selected as the Mets' Opening Day starting pitcher for the 2017 MLB season. He took a no decision in the subsequent 6–0 victory over the Atlanta Braves, pitching six scoreless innings before a blood blister popped in his finger, leading to his removal from the game. On May 1, the Mets announced that Syndergaard, who had already suffered a hamstring injury and biceps discomfort in the first three weeks of the season, had partially torn his right latissimus dorsi muscle and was expected to miss at least the next two months of the season. Syndergaard had previously declined to undergo medical imaging for his sore arm, instead taking the mound for his scheduled April 30 start, a 23–5 loss to the Washington Nationals during which he tore the torso muscle. This injury, coupled with a number of other high-profile injuries to Mets stars like Michael Conforto, Zack Wheeler, and Yoenis Céspedes, raised concerns from sports analysts about the team's rigorous training regimen and resistance towards placing players on the disabled list.

After missing five months of the season, Syndergaard was activated on September 22 to pitch one live, major league inning as part of his rehabilitation process. General manager Sandy Alderson told reporters that Syndergaard's physical rehabilitation was progressing well, and that having the pitcher "back on the mound if only for a moment relatively before the season ends" would help him mentally readjust to major league play. He needed only five pitches to get through the inning, although the Mets lost to the Nationals 4–3 in extra innings. Four of those pitches registered at or above 98 mph (158 km/h). After the game, Syndergaard told reporters that he felt it was important to pitch in a game again before the end of the season after spending so much time and energy on his rehabilitation, because, "[o]therwise, what was I really doing?" He received one more start that season, holding the Philadelphia Phillies scoreless for two innings and 26 pitches and reaching pitch speeds up to 101 mph (163 km/h). After he left, however, the Mets lost the game 11–0 in a Phillies rout. Making only seven appearances in his injury-shortened season, Syndergaard finished the year 1–2 with a 2.97 ERA and struck out 34 batters in 30 1/3 innings.

==== 2018 ====
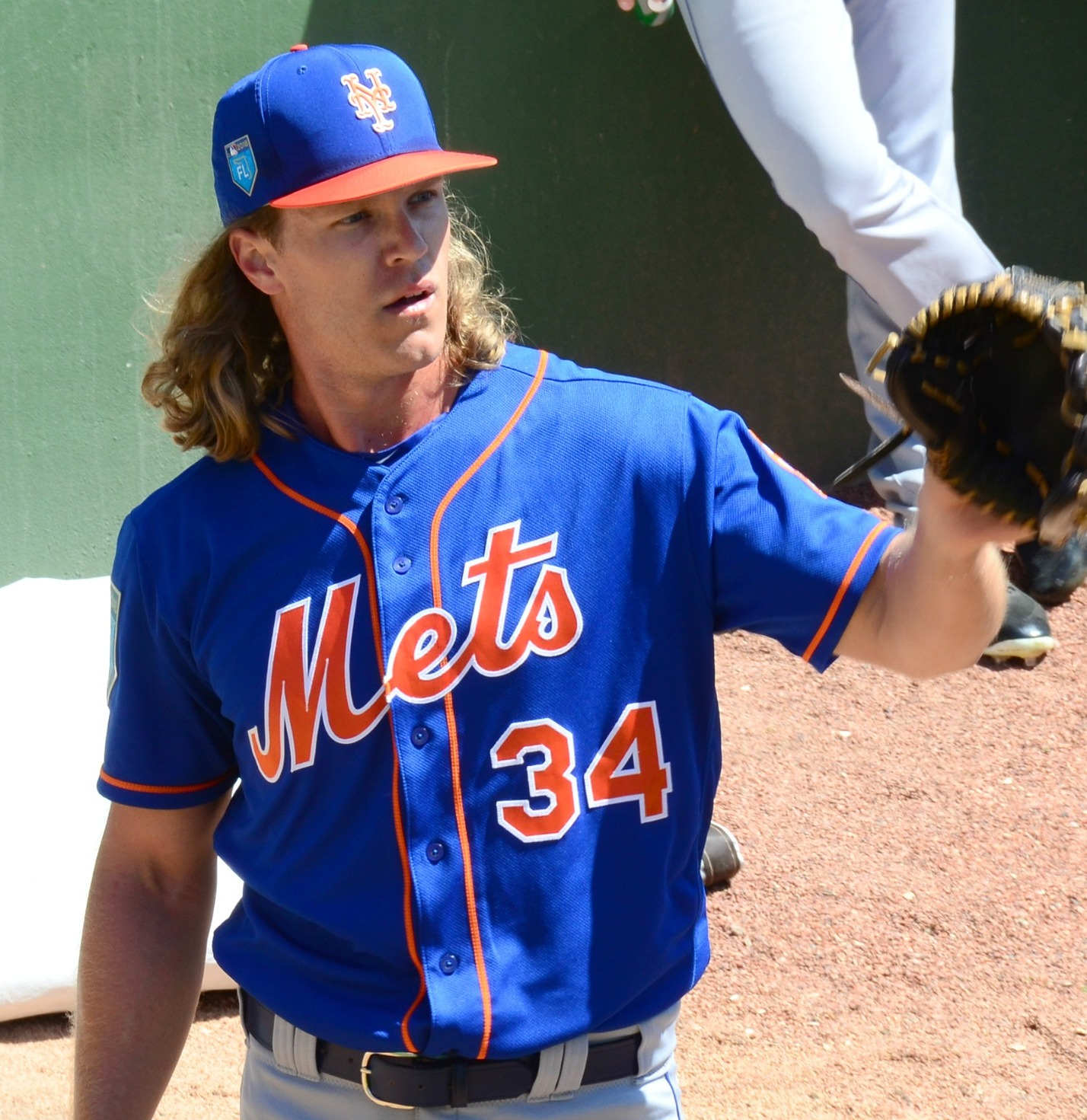
Syndergaard warming up before a spring training game in 2018

Declared healthy prior to the start of the season, Syndergaard was given his second consecutive Opening Day start on March 29, 2018. Pitching in six innings of the Mets' 9–4 victory over the St. Louis Cardinals, he became the second pitcher in franchise history to strike out 10 or more batters on Opening Day, following Pedro Martínez's rout of the Cincinnati Reds in 2005. He was 4–1 with a 3.06 ERA and 76 strikeouts in his first 11 starts before going on the disabled list on May 29 with a strained ligament in his right index finger. He returned to the mound on July 13 on a strict pitch count, allowing only one run in five innings of a 4–2 win against the Washington Nationals.

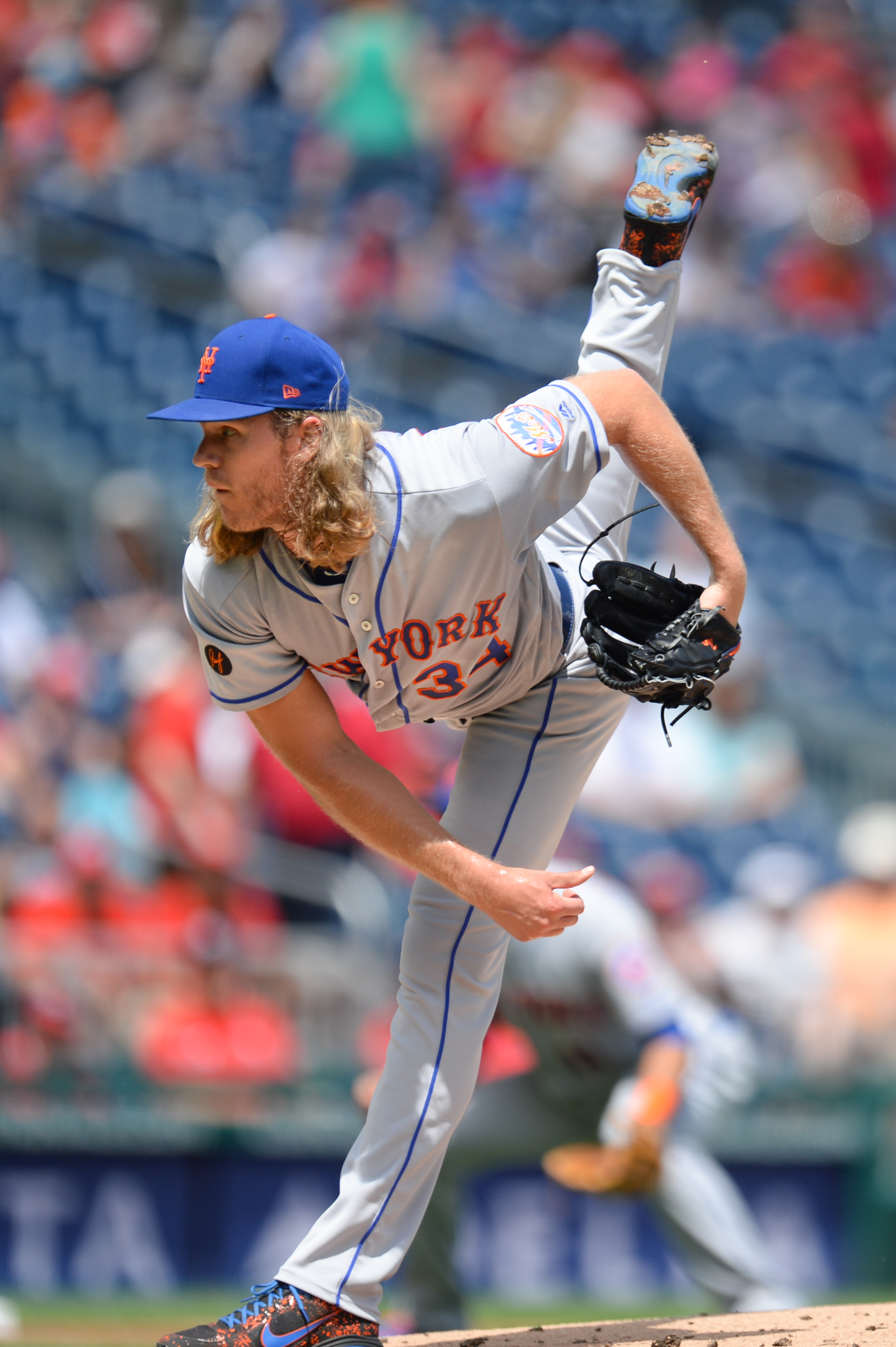
Syndergaard in action with the Mets in 2018

His fastball speed reached up to 99 mph (159 km/h), and he recorded an RBI single in the second inning. One week later, Syndergaard was briefly sidelined again after contracting hand, foot, and mouth disease from volunteering at a children's camp during the All-Star break. He was activated on August 1, the same day New York Yankees pitcher J. A. Happ also contracted the virus. On September 2, Syndergaard pitched his first major league complete game, striking out 11 and holding the San Francisco Giants to two hits in a 4–1 victory. After battling a sinus infection in the last week of September, Syndergaard closed the Mets' 2018 season with his first career complete game shutout, a 1–0 victory over the Miami Marlins. He made 25 starts that season, during which he went 13–4 with a 3.03 ERA and struck out 155 batters in 154 1/3 innings.

==== 2019 ====
Allowing four runs in six innings of what was ultimately an 11–8 win over the Nationals, Syndergaard described his 2019 season debut as "mediocre", blaming a slider that "really sucked". The first month of the season proved difficult for the Mets' entire starting rotation, with a combined 5.35 ERA among Syndergaard, deGrom, Wheeler, Matz, and Jason Vargas. Syndergaard personally had an ERA of 6.35 through his first six starts. His luck changed on May 2, when Syndergaard provided the only run in a 1–0 victory over the Cincinnati Reds. He became the seventh pitcher in MLB history to throw a 1–0 shutout while providing his own home run, and was the first since Bob Welch in 1983. The performance earned Syndergaard NL Player of the Week honors for the week ending May 5, and his ERA dropped to only 5.02 after the shutout. He earned the honor again for the week ending August 4 after two standout performances: after striking out 11 Chicago White Sox in 7 1/3 innings on July 30, he held the Pittsburgh Pirates to one run on August 4, which dropped his ERA below 4.00 for the first time that season. Syndergaard spent the back half of June on the injured list (renamed from the disabled list that season) with a hamstring injury, but returned at the end of the month for a no decision in a game against the Atlanta Braves. Throughout the season, Syndergaard consistently performed better when pitching to backup catchers Tomas Nido and Rene Rivera rather than starter Wilson Ramos: his ERA was 2.22 in a combined 11 starts with Nido and Rivera, compared to 5.09 in 15 starts with Ramos. In the final stretch of the season, manager Mickey Callaway denied Syndergaard's requests not to pitch to Ramos, who was enjoying an offensive hot streak that the Mets front office believed offset his uneasy relationship with Syndergaard. Syndergard started in 32 games for the Mets in 2019, but posted a 10–8 record and a career-high 4.28 in the process. He also struck out 202 batters in 197 2/3 innings and led the NL by allowing 94 earned runs.

=== 2020–2021: Tommy John surgery and recovery and final season with the Mets ===
==== 2020 ====
During spring training in 2020, Syndergaard began to experience elbow discomfort, and he underwent an MRI exam at the suggestion of team athletic trainers when the 2020 MLB season was temporarily shut down due to the COVID-19 pandemic. The exam revealed that Syndergaard had torn the ulnar collateral ligament in his right elbow, an injury which required Tommy John surgery to repair. Although the terms of the pandemic-altered 2020 season had not been finalized by the time Syndergaard underwent surgery at the end of March, the earliest that he was expected to return to the Mets was in mid-2021. Syndergaard's decision to undergo an elbow repair surgery during a time when many doctors were canceling elective surgeries and conserving hospital resources for the pandemic was met with some controversy, and the hospital performing the surgery released a statement attesting that they had deemed Syndergaard's procedure to be essential. Syndergaard's teammate Pete Alonso similarly justified the decision, saying, "No athlete wants to go through a serious surgery and grueling recovery process. This surgery is done when it is absolutely necessary for their arm."

==== 2021 ====
While still recovering from surgery, Syndergaard signed a one-year, $9.7 million contract with the Mets on December 22, 2020, the same amount that he would have made had the 2020 season progressed as normal. He began throwing bullpen sessions again in February 2021, and was assigned to the St. Lucie Mets on May 17 to ease back into live competition. On May 27, however, Syndergaard experienced a sudden drop in pitch velocity and elbow discomfort during his minor league outing, and he was shut down for a minimum of six weeks. Exactly three months later, Syndergaard was activated again, pitching one inning for the Brooklyn Cyclones. Nearly two years after his last appearance for the Mets, Syndergaard returned to the major leagues on September 29, pitching a scoreless inning and striking out two batters in a 2–1 defeat of the Marlins. His fastball was recorded at velocities up to 96 mph (154 km/h), significantly faster than it had been in his rehab outings. He made one more appearance that season, pitching one inning in the Mets' season finale against the Atlanta Braves. He allowed two runs in the outing, a home run to leadoff hitter Jorge Soler followed by an RBI single to Austin Riley, and the Braves shut out the Mets 5–0.

=== Los Angeles Angels (2022) ===
Although the Mets tendered Syndergaard a qualifying offer for the 2022 MLB season, on November 17, 2021, he signed a one-year, $21 million contract with the Los Angeles Angels, breaking Jered Weaver and C. J. Wilson's record for the highest per-season earnings of any pitcher in franchise history. Syndergaard became the first Angels player since the late Nick Adenhart to wear No. 34, receiving the approval of the Adenhart family. In his Angels debut on April 9, 2022, Syndergaard pitched 5 1/3 innings while giving up two hits and two walks, contributing to a shutout of the Houston Astros. He induced 11 groundball outs and struck out only one, the lowest amount of strikeouts in a multi-inning start in his career.

=== Philadelphia Phillies (2022) ===
On August 2, 2022, the Angels traded Syndergaard to the Philadelphia Phillies in exchange for Mickey Moniak and prospect Jadiel Sanchez. In 2022 between both teams, he was 10–10 with one complete game and a 3.94 ERA in 134 2/3 innings over 25 games (24 starts).

=== Los Angeles Dodgers (2023) ===
On December 16, 2022, the Los Angeles Dodgers signed Syndergaard to a one-year deal for $13 million. He made 12 starts with the Dodgers, with a 1–4 record and 7.16 ERA in 55 1/3 innings. He was placed on the injured list on June 8 as a result of recurring blisters on his pitching hand.

=== Cleveland Guardians (2023) ===
On July 26, 2023, the Dodgers traded Syndergaard and cash considerations to the Cleveland Guardians in exchange for shortstop Amed Rosario. In five starts for Cleveland, he posted a 4.94 ERA with 15 strikeouts in 27 1/3 innings pitched. On August 27, Syndergaard was designated for assignment by the Guardians. He was released by Cleveland on August 31.

=== Chicago White Sox (2025) ===
On June 24, 2025, after nearly two years of inactivity, Syndergaard signed a minor league contract with the Chicago White Sox. He made his first appearance with the Triple-A Charlotte Knights on July 23, allowing five earned runs in four innings. In six starts split between Charlotte and the rookie-level Arizona Complex League White Sox, Syndergaard accumulated a 1-1 record and 5.40 ERA with 14 strikeouts across 23 1/3 innings pitched. Syndergaard was released by the White Sox organization on August 2.

== Pitching style ==
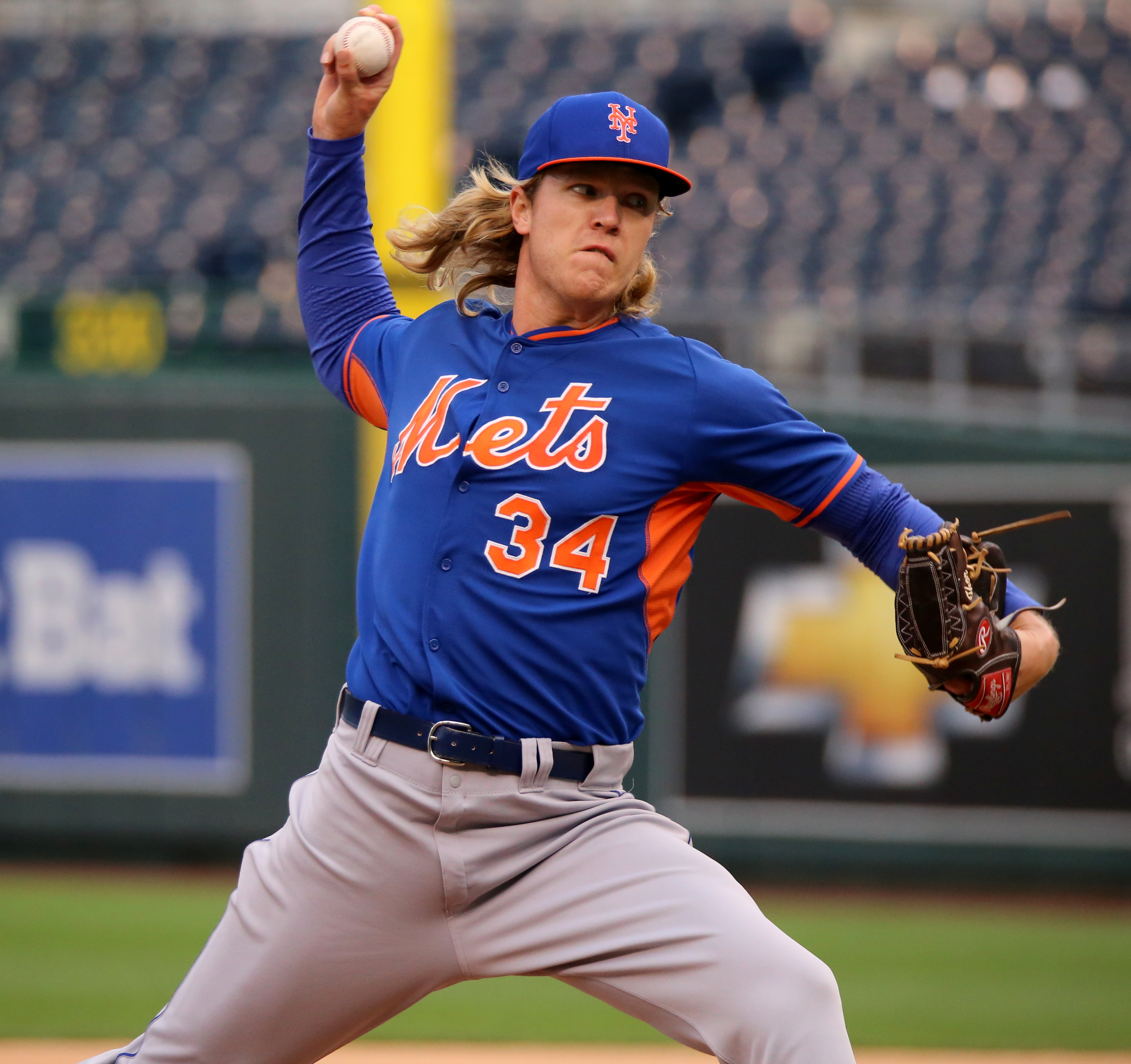
Syndergaard mid-pitch with the Mets in 2015

In 2019, Syndergaard's last full season before undergoing Tommy John surgery, he carried four different types of pitches: a 98 mph (158 km/h) fastball, a 91 mph (146 km/h) changeup, an 89 mph (143 km/h) slider, and an 80 mph (130 km/h) curveball. Early in his career, he was one of the hardest-throwing active MLB starting pitchers: in 2018, the average velocity of his four-seam fastball, sinker, changeup, and slider were all the highest of any major league starter, and he has been known to reach fastball speeds up to 101 mph (163 km/h). His average fastball velocity of 97.9 mph (157.6 km/h) was about 1.5 mph (2.4 km/h) faster than the next-best starting pitcher, and was the fastest average pitch velocity since 2007, the first year that the metric was reliably tracked. Syndergaard's pitch velocity came under scrutiny in 2020, when he, like many other of the fastest pitchers in MLB, had to undergo Tommy John surgery for an elbow injury. Sportswriters like Tom Verducci of Sports Illustrated began to show concern that a focus on maximizing velocity was leading to injury for pitchers like Syndergaard.

On the mound, Syndergaard has told reporters that he wants to be "as intimidating as possible", in sharp contrast with his reserved personality outside of game scenarios. Syndergaard also has a notably subdued pitch delivery system, mostly foregoing a windup in favor of always pitching from the stretch, a decision that he believes improves his pitch control and helps him replicate his mechanics more reliably.

== Personal life ==
Syndergaard received the nickname "Thor" from Mets fans in 2013, when he posted a video on Twitter of himself weightlifting while wearing a Halloween costume of the Marvel Cinematic Universe character of the same name. The nickname also alludes to Syndergaard's Scandinavian heritage, as the Marvel character is based on a Norse deity. Syndergaard's last name has been repeatedly misspelled by MLB. His poster at the 2016 All-Star Game read "Snydergaard", while a jersey advertisement featured on the Fanatics team store misspelled his name "Synedrgaard". All of Syndergaard's baseball gloves are named after fictional characters. In addition to his signature "Thor" glove, he has also used gloves named "Drago", "Heisenberg", "Rick Grimes", "Tyrion Lannister", "Jon Snow", and "Loki". One glove not named after a fictional character is "Lion", named after an inside joke with Kevin Pillar: Syndergaard is the "lion on the mound", and Pillar the "lion in the outfield". Syndergaard regularly auctions off his gloves to raise money for research into Sjögren syndrome, an autoimmune disease from which his mother suffers.

Outside baseball, Syndergaard had made a number of cameo appearances on television shows. In 2016, he made a guest appearance on the sitcom Kevin Can Wait, fronted by lifelong Mets fan Kevin James. In the Halloween-themed episode, Syndergaard plays a man dressed as a Viking who confronts Chale, one of the main characters. Later that year, he appeared as himself in a voice acting capacity for a World Series-themed episode of the Cartoon Network television show Uncle Grandpa. The episode also featured fellow MLB All-Stars David Price, Adam Jones, Chris Archer, and Jose Altuve. In 2017, Syndergaard appeared in the Game of Thrones episode "The Spoils of War", acting as a spearman for House Lannister who is eventually killed by one of Daenerys Targaryen's dragons. That same year, Syndergaard appeared as himself on an episode of the reality television prank show Impractical Jokers. The prank involved Syndergaard attempting to throw autographed baseballs to young fans in the stands, only for cast member Joe Gatto to steal the balls from the children.

Syndergaard maintains an active social media presence, particularly on Twitter. While recovering from Tommy John surgery, Syndergaard used his social media presence to form a book club with fans, stating reading was both a way to feel connected with fans and a way to further his education, as he did not attend college. In 2021, he publicly feuded with Dodgers pitcher Trevor Bauer over Twitter regarding an incident in which Bauer's personal website advertised New York Mets merchandise, suggesting that Bauer had signed with the team, when he had actually signed with the Dodgers. Later that year, Syndergaard also feuded with retired radio announcer Mike Francesa on Twitter after Syndergaard's decision to leave the Mets for the Angels.

In a May 2025 post on Instagram, Syndergaard thanked Donald Trump and United States Secretary of Health and Human Services Robert F. Kennedy Jr. for inviting him to the White House for a live reading of the MAHA report. He described the people associated with report as his "mentors and amazing people leading the charge." In May 2026, Syndergaard was among several professional athletes present in the Oval Office when Trump signed a proclamation reinstating the Presidential Physical Fitness Award. In an interview the same day on The Ingraham Angle, he praised Trump. He called it "a dream come true" to meet the president, said he was "envious of [his] mental energy" and claimed he did not "quite understand" criticism of Donald Trump.
