= Campbell De Morgan =

British surgeon (1811–1876)

Campbell Greig De Morgan (22 November 1811 – 12 April 1876) was a British surgeon who first speculated that cancer arose locally and then spread, first to the lymph nodes and then more widely in the body. His name is used to describe the non cancerous Campbell de Morgan spot; bright red spots that may appear on the skin in later life and which he was the first to note in medical literature.

== Life ==
He was born in 1811 at Clovelly near Bideford, Devon, England in 1811, youngest of three sons of Colonel John de Morgan (1772-1816), of the Indian Army, and Elizabeth (1776-1856), daughter of John Dodson and granddaughter of the mathematician James Dodson. The de Morgan family, of Huguenot origin, had a long association with the British East India Company. The mathematician Augustus De Morgan was an older brother.

He trained at University College Hospital, London and went on to be a house surgeon at the Middlesex Hospital where he remained for the rest of his career. He was actively involved in the Middlesex Hospital Medical School from its foundation in 1835 and was a close associate of its founder, Sir Charles Bell.

In 1841 he became a lecturer in forensic medicine and in 1845 professor of anatomy. In 1861, on the basis of a paper on the structure and development of bone, he was elected a Fellow of the Royal Society.

He also pursued an interest in the arts. He was a talented musician who studied the science of music, and was a gifted caricaturist.

His death in 1876 was caused by his sitting up throughout the night of 6 April at the bedside of his close friend, the artist John Graham Lough. Lough was critically ill with pneumonia and died the following morning. De Morgan himself then developed pneumonia and pleurisy from which he himself died on 12 April.

He was married to Kate Hudson and they had two sons Walter and John.

A bust of Campbell De Morgan by John Graham Lough is located at the Middlesex Hospital, London.
