= Cherry angioma =

Small bright red dome-shaped bump on the skin

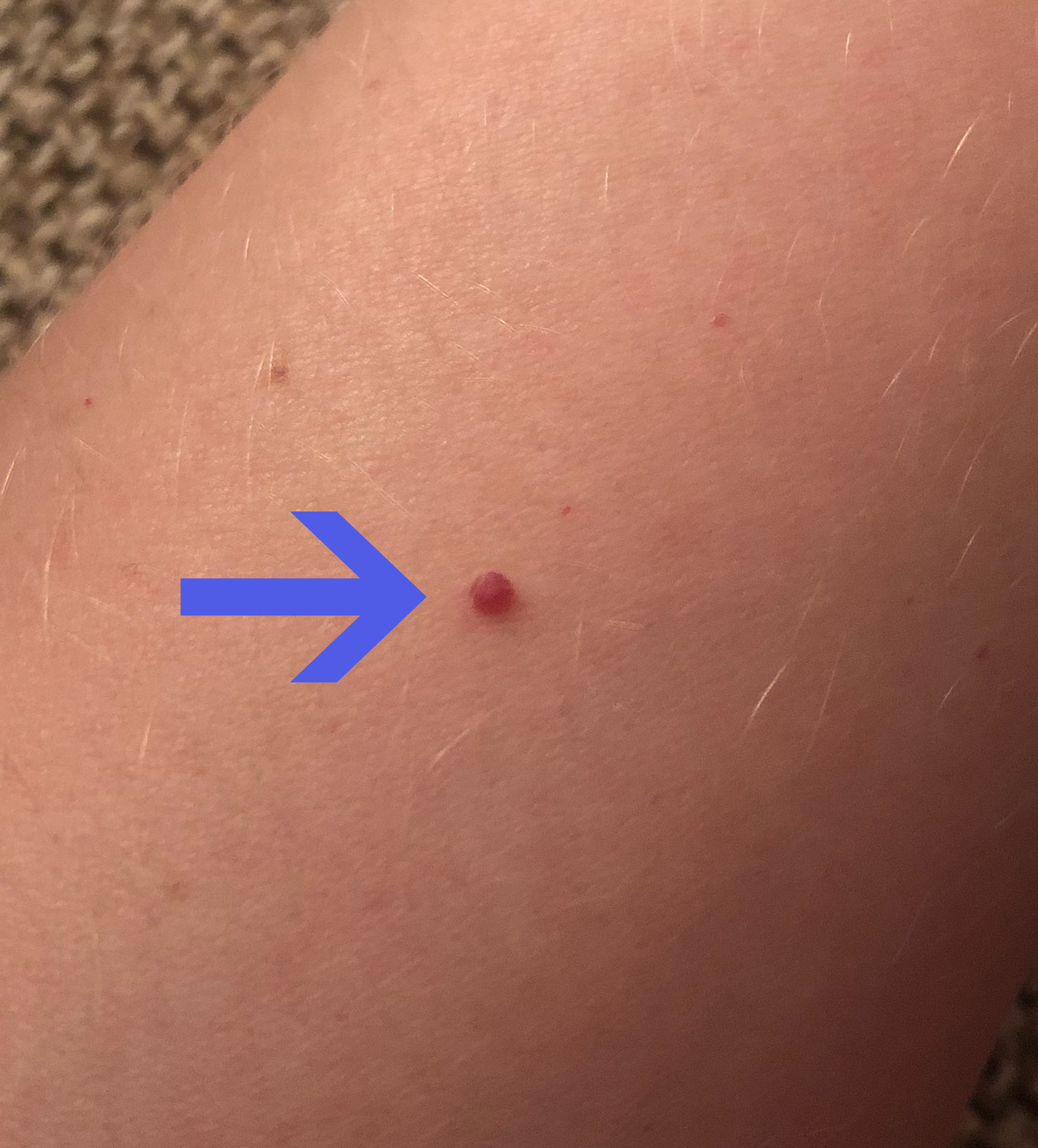
- A cherry angioma on a person's arm
- Specialty: Dermatology

A cherry angioma, also called a cherry hemangioma or Campbell de Morgan spot, is a small bright red dome-shaped bump on the skin. It ranges between 0.5 and 6 mm in diameter and usually several are present, typically on the chest and arms, and increasing in number with age. If scratched, they may bleed.

They are a harmless benign tumour, containing an abnormal proliferation of blood vessels, and have no relationship to cancer. They are the most common kind of angioma, and increase with age, occurring in nearly all adults over 30 years. They were first described by the 19th-century British surgeon Campbell de Morgan.

== Signs and symptoms ==
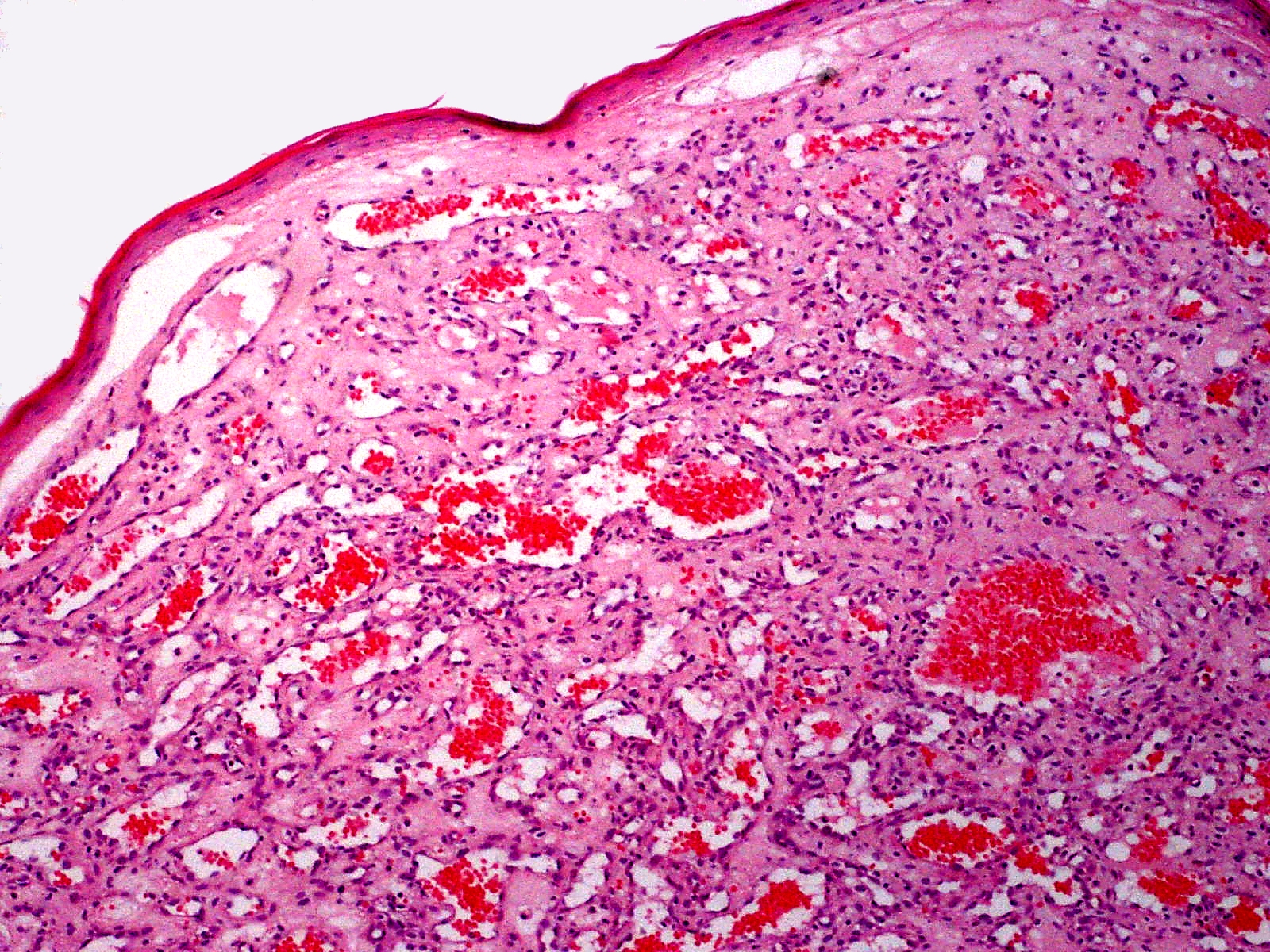
Cherry hemangioma, H&E stain

Cherry angiomas are made up of clusters of capillaries at the surface of the skin, forming a small round dome ("papule"), which may be flat topped. They range in color from bright red to purple. When they first develop, they may be only a tenth of a millimeter in diameter and almost flat, appearing as small red dots. However, they then usually grow to about one or two millimeters across, and sometimes to a centimeter or more in diameter. As they grow larger, they tend to expand in thickness, and may take on the raised and rounded shape of a dome. Multiple adjoining angiomas form a polypoid angioma. Because the blood vessels comprising an angioma are so close to the skin's surface, cherry angiomas may bleed profusely if they are injured.

One study found that the majority of capillaries in cherry hemangiomas are fenestrated and stain for carbonic anhydrase activity.

== Cause ==
Cherry angiomas appear spontaneously in many people in middle age but can also, less commonly, occur in young people. They can also occur in an aggressive eruptive manner in any age. The underlying cause for the development of cherry angiomas is not understood.

Cherry angioma may occur through two different mechanisms: angiogenesis (the formation of new blood vessels from pre-existing vessels), and vasculogenesis (the formation of totally new vessels, which usually occurs during embryonic and fetal development).

One study published in 2010 found that a regulatory nucleic acid suppresses protein growth factors that cause vascular growth. This regulatory nucleic acid was lower in tissue samples of hemangiomas, and the growth factors were elevated, which suggests that the elevated growth factors may cause hemangiomas. The study found that the level of microRNA 424 is significantly reduced in senile hemangiomas compared to normal skin resulting in increased protein expression of MEK1 and cyclin E1. By inhibiting mir-424 in normal endothelial cells they could observe the same increased protein expression of MEK1 and cyclin E1 which, important for the development of senile hemangioma, induced cell proliferation of the endothelial cells. They also found that targeting MEK1 and cyclin E1 with small interfering RNA decreased the number of endothelial cells.

A study published in 2019 identified that somatic mutations in GNAQ and GNA11 genes are present in many cherry angiomas. These specific missense mutations found in hemangiomas are also associated with port-wine stains and uveal melanoma.As – the mostly juvenile – Waterhouse–Friedrichsen Syndrome is caused by adrenal bleeding from bacterial infections, the 'senile' cherry angiomas may have to be researched for a viral and fungal pathology of the adrenals themselves or of the meninges affecting the adrenals with less dramatic bleeding compared to Waterhouse–Friedrichsen's.

Chemicals and compounds that have been seen to cause cherry angiomas are mustard gas, 2-butoxyethanol, bromides, and cyclosporine.

A significant increase in the density of mast cells has been seen in cherry hemangiomas compared with normal skin.

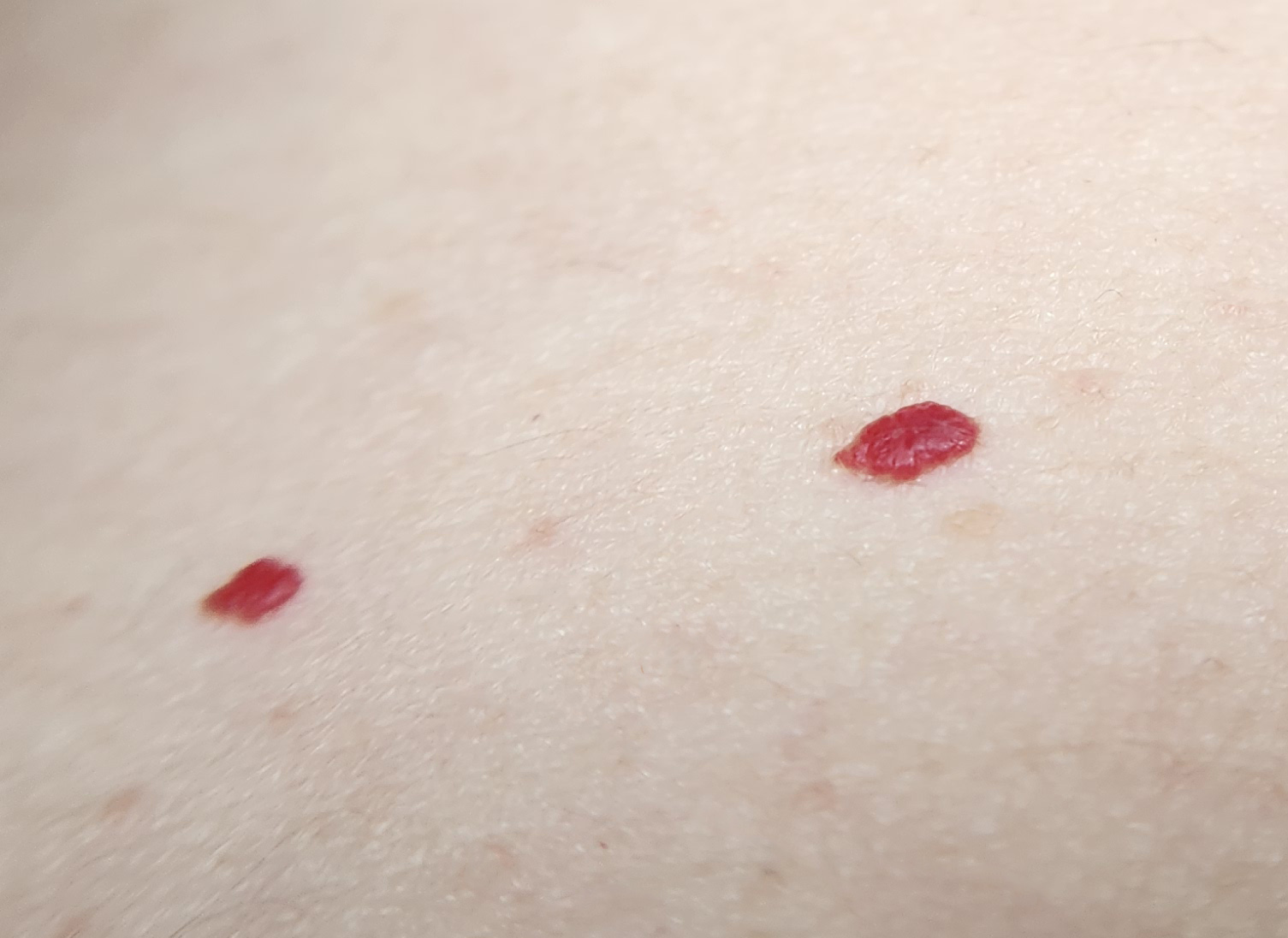
Cherry angioma closeup

== Diagnosis ==
The diagnosis is based on the clinical appearance of the lesions. Examination with a dermatoscope shows characteristic red, purple, or blue-black lagoons.

The differential diagnosis includes nodular basal cell carcinoma, amelanotic melanoma, and angiokeratoma.

== Treatment ==
These lesions generally do not require treatment. If they are cosmetically unappealing or are subject to bleeding, angiomas may be removed by electrocautery, a process of destroying the tissue by use of a small probe with an electric current running through it. Removal may cause scarring. More recently pulsed dye laser or intense pulsed light (IPL) treatment has also been used.

Future treatment based on a locally acting inhibitor of MEK1 and Cyclin E1 could possibly be an option. A natural MEK1 inhibitor is myricetin.

== Prognosis ==
In most patients, the number and size of cherry angiomas increases with advancing age. They are harmless, having no relation to cancer at all. Eruptive cherry hemangiomatosis has been rarely reported as a heralding sign of multicentric Castleman disease (MCD), multiple myeloma, and other lymphoproliferative diseases.

== Epidemiology ==
Cherry angiomas occur in all races, ethnic backgrounds, and sexes.
