= Blister =

Small pocket of fluid within the upper layers of the skin

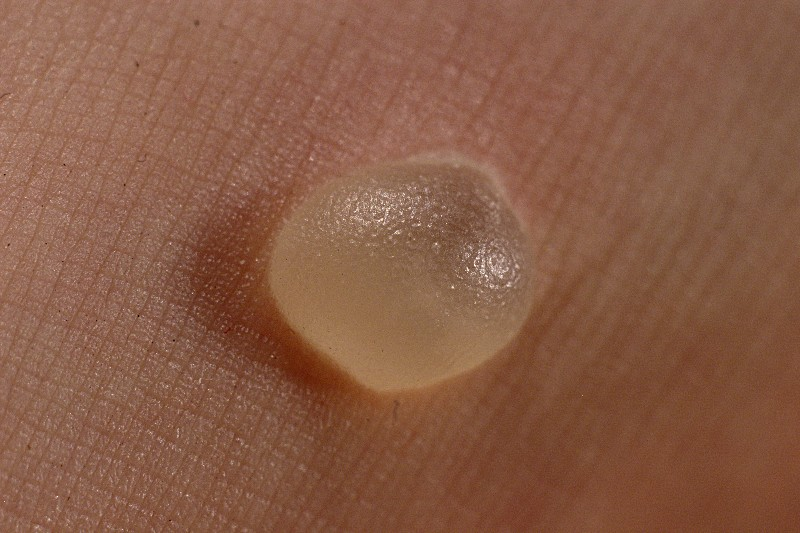
- Blisters from abrasive rubbing are common on the feet.
- Specialty: Dermatology
- Causes: Heat, cold, electricity, chemicals, friction, radiation

A blister is a small pocket of body fluid (lymph, serum, plasma, blood, or pus) within the upper layers of the skin, usually caused by forceful rubbing (friction), burning, freezing, chemical exposure or infection. Most blisters are filled with a clear fluid, either serum or plasma. However, blisters can be filled with blood (known as "blood blisters") or with pus (for instance, if they become infected).

In dermatology, the words vesicle and bulla refer to blisters of smaller or greater size, respectively. Smaller blisters are also called blebs.

== Etymology ==
The word "blister" entered English in the 14th century. It came from the Middle Dutch bluyster and was a modification of the Old French blostre, which meant a leprous nodule: a rise in the skin due to leprosy.

== Causes ==
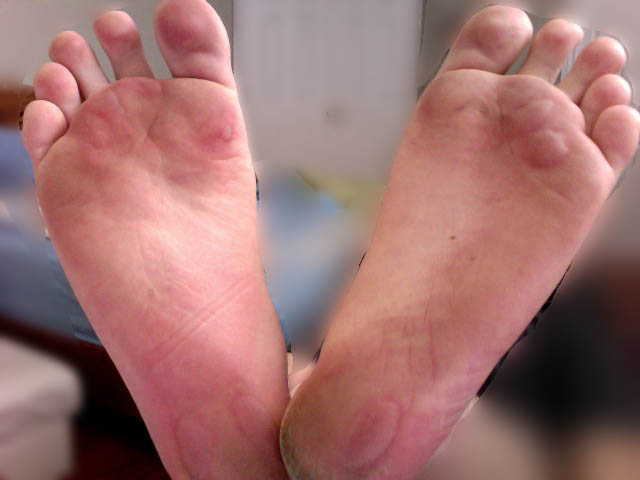
Friction: various sized blisters on the sole of a foot

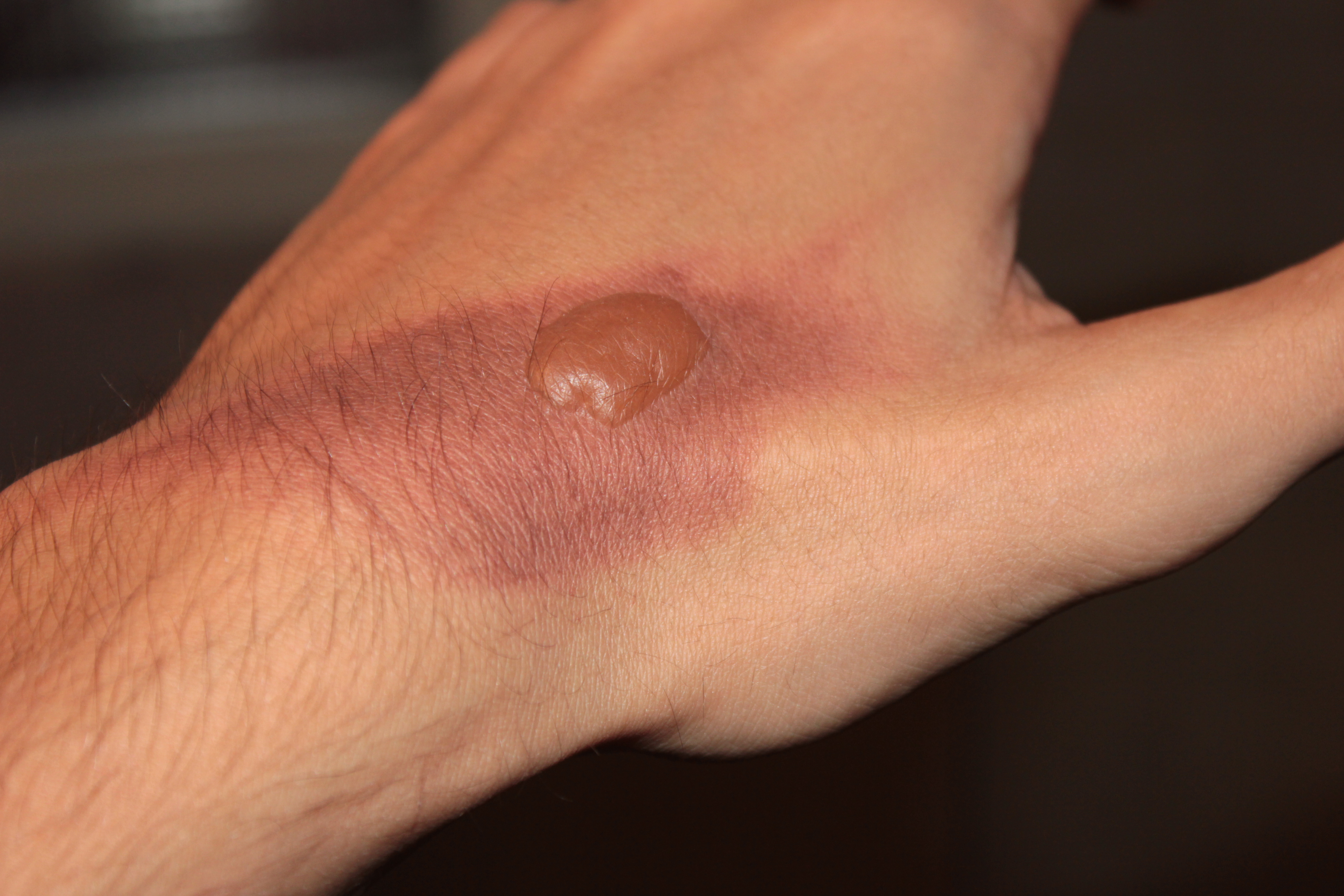
Burning: two days after second-degree burn

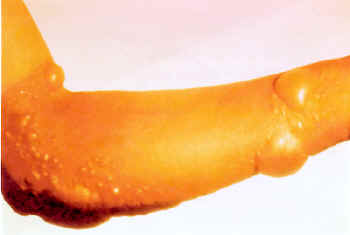
Chemical exposure: sulfur mustard (mustard gas) agent

A blister may form when the skin has been damaged by friction or rubbing, heat, cold or chemical exposure. Fluid collects between the upper layers of skin (the epidermis) and the layers below (the dermis). This fluid cushions the tissue underneath, protecting it from further damage and allowing it to heal.

Medical treatments may use vesicatories (also known as "blisters") to induce blistering.

=== Friction ===
Intense rubbing can cause a blister, as can any friction on the skin if continued long enough. This kind of blister occurs most commonly after walking long distances or through wearing old or poorly-fitting footwear. Blisters occur most commonly on the hands and feet, as these extremities are susceptible while walking, running, or performing repetitive motions, such as joystick manipulation (whilst playing certain video games), participating in certain sports (e.g., baseball pitching), digging with a shovel, playing guitar or bass, etc. Blisters form more easily on damp skin than on dry or soaked skin, and are more common in warm conditions. Less-aggressive rubbing over long periods of time may cause calluses to form rather than blisters. Both blisters and calluses can lead to more serious complications, such as foot ulceration and infection, particularly when sensation or circulation is impaired, as in the case of diabetes, neuropathy or peripheral artery disease (PAD).

=== Burning ===
Observation of blistering is one of the tools used to determine the degree of burns sustained. Both first- and second-degree burns may result in blistered skin; however, second-degree burns characteristically blister immediately, whereas first-degree burns can produce blistering after a couple of days. Sunburn can also result in blisters.

Blisters can also form on the hands and feet as a result of tissue damage incurred by frostbite.

=== Chemical exposure ===
Sometimes skin will blister when it comes into contact with a cosmetic, detergent, solvent, or other chemical such as nickel sulfate, Balsam of Peru, or urushiol (poison ivy, poison oak, poison sumac). This is known as contact dermatitis. Blisters can also develop as a result of an allergic reaction to an insect bite or sting. Some chemical-warfare agents, known as blister agents or as vesicants, cause large, painful blisters wherever they contact skin; an example is mustard gas.

=== Blood blister ===
A blood blister usually forms when a minute blood vessel close to the surface of the skin ruptures (breaks), and blood leaks into a tear between the layers of skin. This can happen if the skin is crushed, pinched or aggressively squeezed.

=== Medical conditions ===
A number of medical conditions can cause blisters. The most common include chickenpox, herpes, impetigo, and a form of eczema called dyshidrosis. Other, much rarer conditions that cause blisters include:

- Bullous pemphigoid: a skin disease that causes large, tightly filled blisters to develop, usually affecting people over the age of 60.
- Pemphigus: a serious skin-disease in which blisters develop if pressure is applied to the skin; the blisters burst easily, leaving raw areas that can become infected.
- Dermatitis herpetiformis: a skin disease that causes intensely itchy blisters, usually on the elbows, knees, back and buttocks. The blisters usually develop in patches of the same shape and size on both sides of the body.
- Chronic bullous dermatosis: a disease that causes clusters of blisters on the face, mouth or genitals.
- Cutaneous radiation syndrome
- Epidermolysis bullosa: a genetic disorder that results in a detachment in the skin layers, resulting in easy bruising.

== Pathophysiology ==
=== Friction blisters ===
Friction blisters are caused by excess shear stress between the bottom and surface of the skin and the body. The strata of skin around the stratum spinosum are most susceptible to shear. As the stratum spinosum tears away from the connecting tissues below, plasma from the cells diffuses out. This plasma solution helps new cells divide and grow into new connective tissues and epidermal layers.

The clear fluid will be reabsorbed as new cells develop and the swollen appearance will subside. Painful blisters located on hands (palmar surface) and feet (plantar surface) are due to tissue shearing deeper in the epidermis, near nerve endings. Lower tissues are more susceptible to infection.

== Prevention ==
=== Friction blisters ===
Friction blisters can be prevented by reducing the friction to a level where blisters will not form. This can be accomplished in a variety of ways.

Blisters on feet can be prevented by wearing comfortable, well-fitting shoes and clean socks. Inherently ill-fitting or stiffer shoes, such as high heels and dress shoes, present a larger risk of blistering. Blisters are more likely to develop on skin that is moist, so socks that manage moisture or frequent sock changes will aid those with particularly sweaty feet. While exercising or playing sports, special sports socks can help keep feet drier and reduce the chance of blisters. Before going for a long walk, it is also important to ensure that shoes or hiking boots have been properly broken in.

Even before a "hot" or irritated area on the foot is felt, taping a protective layer of padding or a friction-reducing interface between the affected area and the footwear can prevent the formation of a blister. Bandages, moleskin and tapes generally must be applied to the foot daily, and most have a very high coefficient of friction (COF), but a friction-management patch applied to the shoe will remain in place much longer, throughout many changes of socks and insoles. This type of intervention may be used with footwear that is worn daily, with specialty shoes and boots like hockey skates, ice skates, inline skates, ski boots and cleats, or even with orthotic braces and splints. For periods of sustained use such as hiking and trail running, especially where water ingress or moisture build up in the shoe or boot can occur, moisture wicking liner socks can provide the required friction protection.

To avoid friction blisters on the hands, gloves should be worn when using tools such as a shovel or pickaxe, doing manual work such as gardening, or using sports equipment like golf clubs or baseball bats. Oars used for competitive rowing are known for causing frequent blisters on the hands of oarsmen. Weightlifters are also prone to blisters as are gymnasts from the friction developed by the rubbing against the bars. To further reduce the occurrence one can tape the hands, and there are also a number of products on the market that claim to reduce the occurrence of blisters. These are all intended to be worn as a liner underneath a glove. The majority of these offerings simply add padding, and create a layer that reduces the coefficient of friction between the skin and the glove.

A lubricant, typically talcum powder, can be used to reduce friction between skin and apparel in the short term. People put talcum powder inside gloves or shoes for this purpose, although this type of lubricant can actually increase the friction in the long term as it absorbs moisture. Increased friction makes blisters more likely.

Sunscreen and protective clothing should also be used during the hottest part of the day to avoid blisters from sunburn. Avoiding sunlight during midday is the best way to avoid blisters from sunburn. Protective gloves should be worn when handling detergents, cleaning products, solvents and other chemicals.

== Treatment ==
Some sources recommend not to pop a blister. If popped, bacteria can enter. Excess skin should not necessarily be removed, as the top layer protects the soft tissue underneath. However, some sources also recommend that if a blister is too big, it should indeed be popped.
