= Blood blister =

Injury of subdermal tissues and blood vessels where damage does not pierce the skin

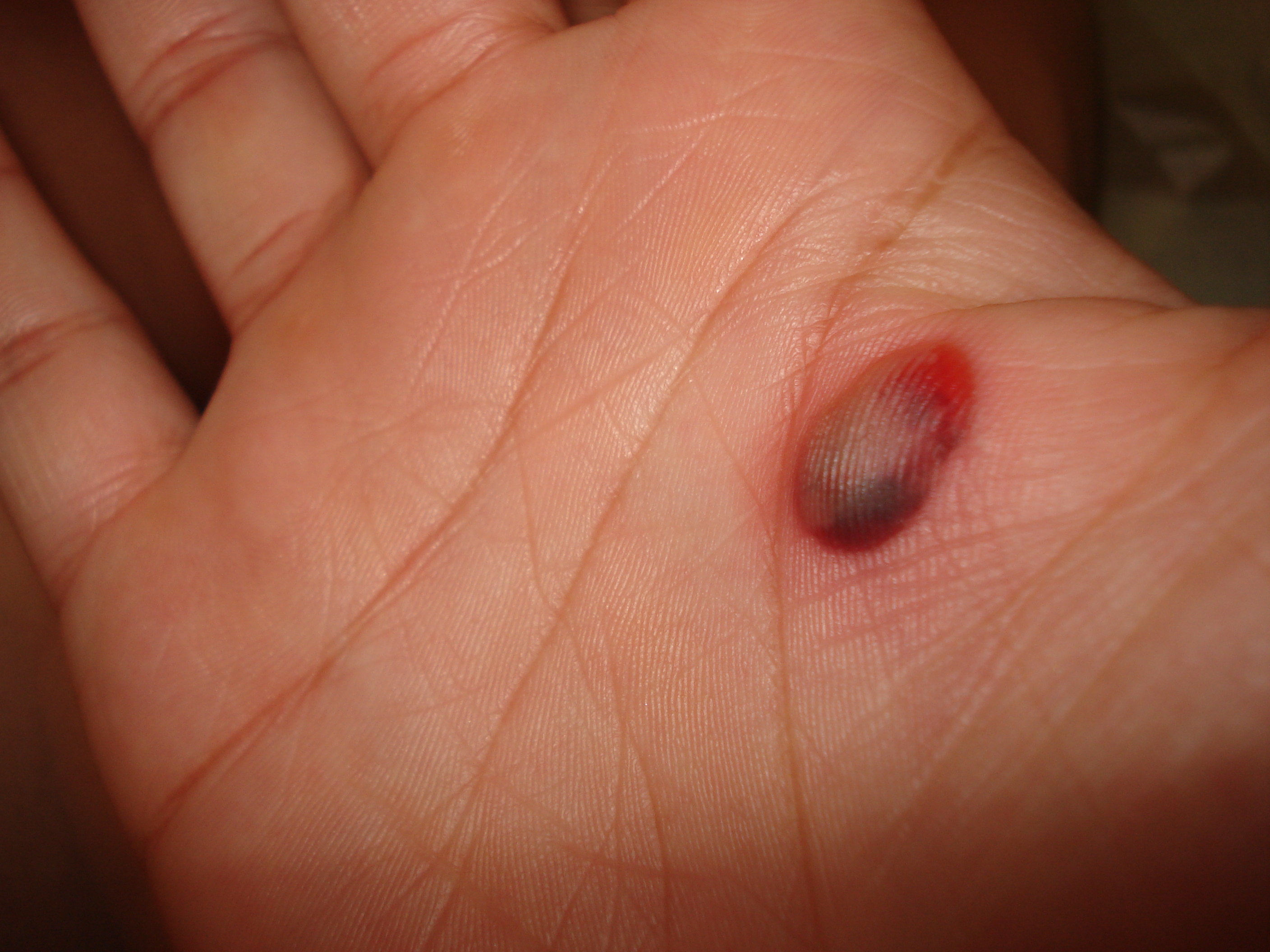
- On palm of right hand
- Specialty: Dermatology
- Causes: Accident

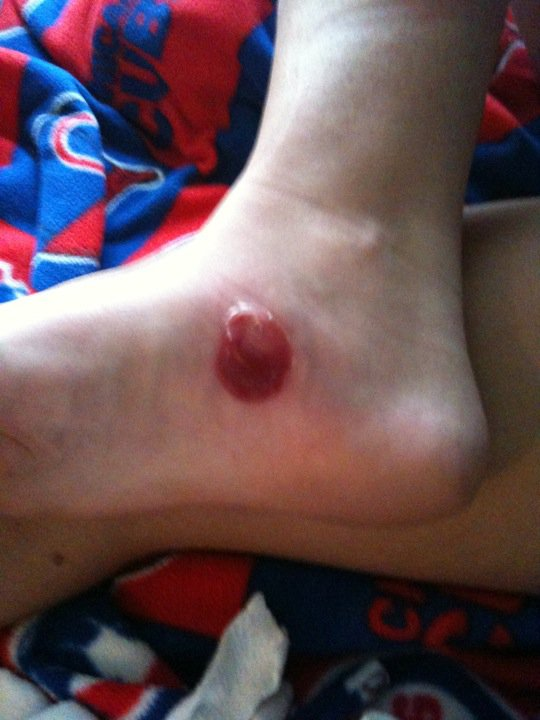
Large blood blister on right foot

A blood blister is a type of blister that forms when subdermal tissues and blood vessels are damaged without piercing the skin. It consists of a pool of lymph, blood and other bodily fluids trapped beneath the skin. If punctured, it suppurates a dark fluid. Sometimes the fluids are cut off from the rest of the body and dry up, leaving behind dead cell material inside the blister with a texture like putty. Some blood blisters can be extremely painful due to bruising where the blister occurred.

There are also blood blister-like aneurysms. These are sometimes located in the supraclinoid internal carotid artery, and have been recognized as having unique pathological and clinical features.

== Causes ==
Blood blisters are commonly caused by accidents in which the skin is pinched by a tool, mechanism, or heavy weight without protective equipment. Blood blisters can also arise from forcible human contact, including grappling.

Blood blisters also may occur with friction caused by constant rubbing of skin against a surface. Ill-fitting shoes that rub on the skin can cause the blood vessels in the skin to break and form a blood clot under the skin, resulting in a blood blister. Certain sports activities that require repeated movement and rubbing of the skin against equipment may also cause this; baseball pitchers, rowers, and drummers often contract blood blisters on the fingers and palms. They also form as a result of frostbite.

Blood blisters can also occur in the mouth for a variety of reasons including side effects to certain medications, nutritional deficiencies, and mouth injuries.

== Treatment ==
There are several methods of healing blood blisters, including elevation of the wound combined with application of a cold pack, and application of padded dressings or splints.

== See also ==
- Bleeding – Blood escaping from the circulatory system
- Blister – Small pocket of fluid within the upper layers of the skin
- Bruise – Type of localized bleeding in tissues outside blood vessels
- Cherry angioma – Small bright red dome-shaped bump on the skin
